= 15th International Film Festival of India =

Indian film festival in 1992

- Awarded for: Best of World cinema
- Presented by: Directorate of Film Festivals
- Official website: www.iffigoa.org

The 15th International Film Festival of India was held as IFFI' 92 during 10–20 January 1992 at Bengaluru.

The festival was made interim non-competitive following a decision taken in August 1988 by the Ministry of Information and Broadcasting. The earlier "Filmotsavs" and IFFI 90-91-92 together constituted 23 editions of the festival, and the 1993 IFFI becoming the 24th edition.

== Non-competitive sections ==
- Cinema of The World
- Indian Panorama – Feature Films
- Indian Panorama – Non-Feature Films
- Indian Panorama – Mainstream Films
