= IFFI Special Jury Award and Special Mention =

Award in an Indian film festival

- International award for contributions to World Cinema
- Awarded for: Excellency in Film Art
- Sponsored by: Directorate of Film Festivals
- Rewards: Special Jury Award; Special Mention
- First award: 1969
- Most recent winner: Akinola Davies Jr. My Father's Shadow (2025)

Highlights
- Total awarded: 43
- First winner: Lester James Peries
- Last winner: Lav Diaz; Praveen Kandregula

The IFFI Special Jury Award and Special Mention (officially known as the Silver Peacock – Special Jury Award and Special Mention) are two honors presented annually at the International Film Festival of India for excellence in Film Art in World cinema. It was first presented during the 4th IFFI (1969). The award was discontinued later but reinstated from the 29th IFFI (1998). On the occasion of 100 years of Indian cinema, centenary awards were conferred during 2012, 2013, and 2014. The special mention is being awarded since the 46th IFFI 2015.

== List of recipients of IFFI Special Jury Award ==
List of Silver Peacock award recipients, showing the year, film(s) and language(s)
| Year | Recipient(s) | Work(s) | Language(s) | Country | Ref. |
|---|---|---|---|---|---|
| 1969 (4th) | Lester James Peries | Golu Hadawatha | Sinhala | Sri Lanka | |
| 1969 (4th) | Mrinal Sen | Bhuvan Shome | Hindi | India | |
| 1969 (4th) | Sobhan Babu | Bangaru Panjaram | Telugu | India | |
| 1998 (29th) | Santwana Bardoloi | Adajya | Assamese | India | |
| 2000 (31st) | Huo Jianqi | Postmen in the Mountains | Mandarin | China | |
| 2002 (33rd) | Revathi | Mitr, My Friend | Hindi | India | |
| 2002 (33rd) | Magdy Ahmed Ali | Asrar EL-Banat | Egyptian | Egypt | |
| 2003 (34th) | Subhadro Chowdhury | Prohor | Bengali | India | |
| 2004 (35th) | Gennady Sidorov | Old Women | Russian | Russia | |
| 2005 (36th) | Tom Hooper | Red Dust | English | South Africa | |
| 2006 (37th) | Abu Sayeed | Nirontor | Bengali | Bangladesh | |
| 2007 (38th) | Golam Rabanny Biplab | On The Wings of Dreams | Bengali | Bangladesh | |
| 2007 (38th) | Julia Urbini | More Than Anything in the World | Mexican | Mexico | |
| 2008 (39th) | Malani Fonseka | Akasa Kusum | Sinhala | Sri Lanka | |
| 2009 (40th) | Giorgi Ovashvili | The Other Bank | Russian | Georgia | |
| 2010 (41st) | Kaushik Ganguly | Arekti Premer Golpo | Bengali | India | |
| 2010 (41st) | Taika Waititi | Boy | English | New Zealand | |
| 2011 (42nd) | Salim Ahamed | Adaminte Makan Abu | Malayalam | India | |
| 2012 (43rd) | Lucy Mulloy | Una noche | Spanish | Cuba; United Kingdom | |
| 2013 (44th) | Onur Ünlü | Thou Gild'st the Even | Turkish | Turkey | |
| 2015 (46th) | Julia Vargas-Weise | Sealed Cargo | Spanish | Bolivia | |
| 2016 (47th) | Lee Joon-ik | The Throne | Korean | South Korea | |
| 2017 (48th) | Mahesh Narayanan | Take Off | Malayalam | India | |
| 2018 (49th) | Milko Lazarov | Ága | Yakut | Bulgaria | |
| 2019 (50th) | Pema Tseden | Balloon | Chinese | China | |
| 2020 (51st) | Kamen Kalev | February | Bulgarian | Bulgaria | |
| 2021 (52nd) | Renata Carvalho | The First Fallen | Brazilian | Brazil | |
| 2021 (52nd) | Nikhil Mahajan | Godavari | Marathi | India | |
| 2022 (53rd) | Lav Diaz | When The Waves Are Gone | Filipino | Philippines | |
| 2023 (54th) | Rishab Shetty | Kantara | Kannada | India | |
| 2024 (55th) | Louise Courvoisier | Holy Cow | French | France | |
| 2025 (56th) | Akinola Davies Jr. | My Father's Shadow | English, Naija, Yoruba | United Kingdom, Ireland, Nigeria | |

== List of recipients of IFFI Special Mention ==
List of Special Mention recipients, showing the year, film(s) and language(s)
| Year | Recipient(s) | Work(s) | Language(s) | Country | Ref. |
|---|---|---|---|---|---|
| 2015 (46th) | Goran Radovaovic | Enclave | Serbian | Germany; Serbia | |
| 2016 (47th) | Tiffany Hsiung | The Apology | English | Canada | |
| 2018 (49th) | Chezhiyan | To Let | Tamil | India | |
| 2019 (50th) | Abhishek Shah | Hellaro | Gujarati | India | |
| 2020 (51st) | Kripal Kalita | Bridge | Assamese | India | |
| 2021 (52nd) | Simon Farriol | The Wealth of the World | English | | |
| 2021 (52nd) | Roman Vasyanov | The Dorm | Russian | Russia | |
| 2022 (53rd) | Praveen Kandregula | Cinema Bandi | Telugu | India | |

== List of recipients of IFFI Centenary Award ==
List of Centenary Award recipients, showing the year, film(s) and language(s)
| Year | Recipient(s) | Work(s) | Language(s) | Country | Ref. |
|---|---|---|---|---|---|
| 2012 (43rd) | Mira Nair | The Reluctant Fundamentalist | English | United States; India; Qatar | |
| 2013 (44th) | Kamaleshwar Mukherjee | Meghe Dhaka Tara | Bengali | India | |
| 2014 (45th) | Shrihari Sathe | Ek Hazarachi Note | Marathi | India | |
