= 6th International Film Festival of India =

Indian film festival in 1977

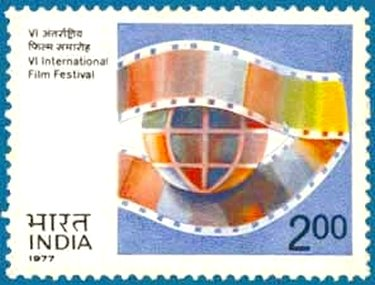
- Sixth International Film Festival of India, New Delhi postage stamp 1977
- Awarded for: Best of World cinema
- Presented by: Directorate of Film Festivals
- Presented on: 16 January 1977
- Official website: www.iffigoa.org
- Best Feature Film: "Brother and Sister"

The 6th International Film Festival of India was held from 3–16 January 1977 in New Delhi. The festival highlighted Indian films which had won awards at foreign film festivals. The festival instituted Silver Peacock Awards for Best Director, Best Actor, Best Actress, Short film, along with Bronze Peacock for Best Short film for the first time. From the sixth edition, the period as well as the dates for the festival were fixed as 3–17 January every alternate year. A film market was also set up for the first time by the Indian Motion Picture Export Corporation (now National Film Development Corporation of India). The "Indian Panorama section" was instituted from this edition.

== Winners ==
- Golden Peacock (Best Film): "Brother and Sister" by Tadashi Imai (Japanese film)
- Golden Peacock (Best Short Film) "After the Silence" (Indian film)
