= Golden Peacock for Best Film =

Indian film festival award

Golden Peacock
- IFFI Best Film Award
- Awarded for: "Outstanding film of a high aesthetic and technical standard and educational and culture value"
- Sponsored by: International Film Festival of India
- First award: 1965; 61 years ago
- Final award: 2025
- Most recent winner: Skin of Youth

Highlights
- Total awarded: 38
- First winner: Gamperaliya

The IFFI Best Film Award (officially known as the Golden Peacock for the Best Feature Film) is the main prize of the International Film Festival of India presented annually by the Directorate of Film Festivals, the organisation set up by Ministry of Information and Broadcasting in India. It is one of several awards presented for feature films and awarded with the Golden Peacock a representation of the Peacock, India’s national bird, with a permanent motto of the festival Vasudhaiva Kutumbakam (The whole world is a family). The award is announced for films produced in a year across the world. The award was instituted in 1965 from the 3rd IFFI competitive edition.

== List of recipients ==
The award carries a cash prize of ₹40 lakh (US$43,000) shared equally between the director and producer. The director will receive the Golden Peacock and a certificate in addition to the cash prize. The producer will receive a certificate in addition to the cash.

=== Golden Peacock Award winners (Best Feature Film) ===
Year	Film	Original Title	Director	Country
1965	Gamperaliya		Lester James Peries	Sri Lanka
1969	The Damned		Luchino Visconti	Italy
1974	Dreaming Youth		János Rózsás	Hungary
1977	Brother and Sister	Ani Imōto	Tadashi Imai	Japan
1979	Hungarian Rhapsody		Miklós Jancsó	Hungary
1981	The Unknown Soldier’s Patent Leather Shoes		Rangel Valchanov	Bulgaria
1981	Aakrosh		Govind Nihalani	India
1983	Not Awarded	Not Awarded	Not Awarded	Not Awarded
1985	The Bostonians		James Ivory	United Kingdom
1985	Ruthless Romance		Eldar Ryazanov	Russia
1987	Farewell Green Summer	Proshal Zelen Leta	Elyer Ishmukhamedov	Russia
1996	Blush		Li Shaohong	China
1998	The King of Masks		Wu Tianming	China
2000	Karunam	Karunam	Jayaraj	India
2000	Railroad Man	Poppoya	Yasuo Furuhata	Japan
2002	Letters to Elza		Igor Maslennikov	Russia
2003	At Five in the Afternoon	Panj é asr	Samira Makhmalbaf	Iran / France
2004	The Beautiful City	Shah-re ziba	Asghar Farhadi	Iran
2005	Iron Island	Jazireh ahani	Mohammad Rasoulof	Iran
2006	The Old Barber		Hasi Chaolu	China
2007	The Wall		Lin Chih Ju	Taiwan
2008	Tulpan		Sergei Dvortsevoy	Kazakhstan / Russia
2009	Cannot Live Without You		Leon Dai	Taiwan
2010	Moner Manush		Gautam Ghose	India
2011	Porfirio		Alejandro Landes	Colombia / Argentina
2012	Anhe Ghore Da Daan		Gurvinder Singh	India
2013	Beatriz's War	A Guerra da Beatriz	Luigi Acquisto / Bety Reis	Timor-Leste
2014	Leviathan	Leviafan	Andrey Zvyagintsev	Russia
2015	Embrace of the Serpent	El abrazo de la serpiente	Ciro Guerra	Colombia
2016	Daughter	Dokhtar	Reza Mirkarimi	Iran
2017	BPM (Beats per Minute)		Robin Campillo	France
2018	Donbass		Sergei Loznitsa	Ukraine
2019	Particles	Les particules	Blaise Harrison	France / Switzerland
2020	Into the Darkness	De forbandede år	Anders Refn	Denmark
2021	Ring Wandering	リング・ワンダリング	Masakazu Kaneko	Japan
2022	I Have Electric Dreams	Tengo sueños eléctricos	Valentina Maurel	Spain
2023	Endless Borders		Abbas Amini	Iran
2024	Toxic	Akiplėša	Saulė Bliuvaitė	Lithuania
2025	Skin of Youth		Ash Mayfair	Vietnam

== Discontinued awards ==
=== Silver Peacock Award winners (Best Feature Film) ===
Edition	Film	Director	Country
3rd	Nirjan Saikate	Tapan Sinha	India
29th	Paper Airplanes	Farhad Mehhranfar	Iran
45th	Ek Hazarachi Note	Shrihari Sathe	India

=== Golden Peacock Award winners (Best Short Film) ===
Edition	Film	Country
3rd	Cyclone	Cuba
4th	Taking off at 1800 Hours	Cuba
5th	Automatic	Czechoslovakia
6th	After the Silence	India
7th	An Encounter with Faces; Olympic Games	India; Poland
8th	A Period of Transition	Denmark
9th	Not Awarded	Not Awarded
10th	Narcissus	Canada
11th	Not Awarded	Not Awarded

=== Silver Peacock Award winners (Best Short Film) ===
Edition	Film	Country
4th	Man and the Crow	Sri Lanka
