= IFFI Best Actor Award (Male) =

Indian film award

Silver Peacock Best Actor Award (Male)
- International award for contributions to World Cinema
- Awarded for: Best Performance by an Actor
- Sponsored by: Directorate of Film Festivals
- Reward: Silver Peacock Award
- First award: 1979
- Final award: 2025
- Most recent winner: Ubeimar Rios for A Poet

Highlights
- Total awarded: 18
- First winner: Shankar Nag

The IFFI Award for Best Actor (officially known as the Silver Peacock for the Best Actor Award (Male)) is an honor that has been presented annually at the International Film Festival of India since 2010 to an actor for performance in a leading role in World cinema. Earlier, the award was given on two occasions, at the 7th and 11th IFFI, to two Indian actors.

== List of award winners ==
List of award recipients, showing the year, film(s), language(s), and country
Year	Recipient(s)	Work(s)	Language(s)	Country	Ref.
1979 (7th)	Shankar Nag	"Ondanondu Kaladalli"	Kannada	India	
1987 (11th)	Raghubir Yadav	"Massey Sahib"	Hindi	India	
2010 (41st)	Güven Kıraç	"The Crossing"	Turkish	Turkey	
2011 (42nd)	Sasson Gabai	"Restoration"	Hebrew	Israel	
2012 (43rd)	Marcin Dorociński	"Rose"	Polish	Poland	
2013 (44th)	Alon Abutbul	"A Place in Heaven"	Hebrew	Israel	
2014 (45th)	Aleksei Serebryakov" Dulal Sarkar	"Leviathan" "Chotoder Chobi"	Russian; Bengali	Russia	
2015 (46th)	Vincent Lindon	"The Measure of a Man"	French	France	
2016 (47th)	Farhad Aslani	"Daughter"	Persian	Iran	
2017 (48th)	Nahuel Pérez Biscayart	"BPM (Beats per Minute)"	French	France	
2018 (49th)	Chemban Vinod Jose	"Ee.Ma.Yau"	Malayalam	India	
2019 (50th)	Seu Jorge	"Marighella"	Portuguese	Brazil	
2020 (51st)	Troy Liu	Silent Forest	Taiwanese	Taiwan	
2021 (52nd)	Jitendra Joshi	Godavari	Marathi	India	
2022 (53rd)	Vahid Mobasheri	No End	Iranian	Iran	
2023 (54th)	Pouria Rahimi Sam	Endless Borders	Iranian	Iran	
2024 (55th)	Clément Favreau	Holy Cow	France	France	
2025 (56th)	Ubeimar Rios	A Poet	Spanish	Spain	
