= Allari Priyudu =

- Directed by: K. Raghavendra Rao
- Written by: Story & Dialogues: Sathyanand; Screenplay: K. Raghavendra Rao
- Produced by: K. Krishna Mohana Rao
- Starring: Rajasekhar; Ramya Krishna; Madhoo
- Cinematography: A. Vincent; Ajayan Vincent
- Edited by: Kotagiri Venkateswara Rao
- Music by: M. M. Keeravani
- Production companies: Ramanaidu Studios; Annapurna Studios
- Distributed by: R. K. Film Associates
- Release date: 5 March 1993
- Running time: 141 minutes
- Country: India
- Language: Telugu

Allari Priyudu (transl. Naughty Lover) is a 1993 Indian Telugu-language musical romantic comedy film written and directed by K. Raghavendra Rao. The film stars Rajasekhar, Ramya Krishna and Madhoo. The film was featured at the 25th IFFI Indian panorama mainstream section. The film was dubbed into Tamil as Yaarukku Mappillai Yaaro. It was remade in Kannada as Chora Chittha Chora, The film was recorded as a Blockbuster at the box office. The film won two Filmfare Awards and two state Nandi Awards.

== Plot ==
Kavita and Lalita are dearest friends. They've been living together ever since Lalita's father died while trying to save Kavita from being crushed by a machine on a construction site. Lalita has been secretly writing poems to thrill her family and especially Kavita. Meanwhile, Raja is a lower-class musician who stays in a rental house along with his friends with a band owned by Babu Mohan. He lies to his grandmother saying he has a big job, but he believes that one day his band will become popular. He one day comes across one of Lalita's poems and falls in love with her. He writes a letter to Lalita stating how beautiful her poem was, and over time she too falls for him. They both write letters to each other expressing their feelings and eventually wanting to meet each other. However, Raja and Lalita get into a series of clashes without knowing they are the lovers who are writing the letters to each other. Lalita soon finds out that her lover is Raja, but when she is about to propose to him, she finds out that Kavita had fallen in love with him. Not wanting to ruin her relationship with Kavita, she tells Kavita to act like the lady who wrote the letters to Raja. Raja believes it and falls in love with Kavita. The rest of the story deals with whether Raja finds out that Lalita was the one writing the poems and letters to him. What will be Kavita's reaction when she finds the truth? This question forms the climax.

== Cast ==
- Rajasekhar as Raja
- Ramya Krishna as Lalitha Rani
- Madhoo as Kavitha Rani
- Rao Gopal Rao as Kavitha's father
- Brahmanandam as Bitragunta Bilahari
- Sudhakar as Buchchi Babu
- Manorama as Raja's grandmother
- Shubha as Kavita's mother
- Srihari
- Babu Mohan as Raja's house owner
- Suthi Velu as priest
- Chitti Babu Punyamurthula as priest
- Ironleg Sastri as priest
- Ananth as Raja's friend
- Ravi Teja as Raja's friend
- Sarathi as postmaster
- Ramana Murthy as police inspector
- P. Ravi Shankar as Raja's friend
- Raghava Lawrence (special appearance in the song "Rose Rose Roja Puvva")

== Music ==
Allari Priyudu

Soundtrack album by M. M. Keeravani
- Released: 1993
- Length: 33:35
- Producer: M. M. Keeravani

M. M. Keeravani chronology
Rakshana (1993)	Allari Priyudu (1993)	Aadarsham (1993)

The music of the film was composed by M. M. Keeravani.

No	Song title	Singers	Lyricist	Duration
1	"Cheppaka Ne Chebuthunnadi"	K. S. Chithra, S. P. Balasubrahmanyam	Bhuvanachandra	04:43
2	"Em Pilladi"	K. S. Chithra, S. P. Balasubrahmanyam	M.M.Keeravani	05:03
3	"Pranayama Ni Peremiti Pralayama"	K. S. Chithra, S. P. Balasubrahmanyam	Vennelakanti	04:03
4	"Andama Ne Peramiti"	K. S. Chithra, S. P. Balasubrahmanyam	Veturi	05:10
5	"Uttarala Urvasi"	K. S. Chithra, S. P. Balasubrahmanyam	Veturi	04:17
6	"Aho Oka Manasuku"	K. S. Chithra, S. P. Balasubrahmanyam	Sirivennela Seetharama Sastry	05:02
7	"Rose Rose Roja Puvva"	K. S. Chithra, S. P. Balasubrahmanyam	Veturi	05:17

== Awards ==
Filmfare Awards

- Best Director - K. Raghavendra Rao
- Best Music Director - M. M. Keeravani

Nandi Awards

- Best Director - K. Raghavendra Rao
- Best Music Director -M. M. Keeravani
