= 7th International Film Festival of India =

Indian film festival in 1979

- Awarded for: Best of World cinema
- Presented by: Directorate of Film Festivals
- Presented on: 1979
- Official website: www.iffigoa.org
- Best Feature Film: "Hungarian Rhapsody"

The 7th International Film Festival of India was held from 3–17 January 1979 in New Delhi. The festival opened with "Junoon" by Shyam Benegal in the out-of-competition world premiere. The festival was the only competitive and exclusive international film festival organised in the entire Third World during 1978–79. For the first time in the history of the Indian competitive film festivals, the jury was headed by a foreigner, Qusmane Sembene of Senegal. Also for the first time, there were two women on the jury (Chantal Akerman from Belgium, and Marta Maszaves from Hungary).

== Winners ==
- Golden Peacock (Best Film): "Hungarian Rhapsody" by Miklós Jancsó (Hungarian film)
- Golden Peacock (Best Short Film) "An Encounter with Faces" (India)
  "Olympic Games" (Poland)
- IFFI Best Actor Award (Male) (Silver Peacock) Shankar Nag for "Ondanondu Kaladalli"
