= 53rd International Film Festival of India =

2022 Indian film festival

- Official poster
- Opening film: Alma & Oskar by Dieter Berner
- Closing film: Perfect Number by Krzysztof Zanussi
- Location: Dr. Shyama Prasad Mukherjee Indoor Stadium at Panaji, Goa, India
- Founded: 1952
- Awards: Golden Peacock: I Have Electric Dreams by Valentina Maurel; Silver Peacock: Best Director: Nader Saeivar, No End; Best Actor: Vahid Mobasheri, No End; Best Actress: Daniela Marin Navarro, I Have Electric Dreams; ICFT UNESCO Gandhi Medal: Payam Eskandar, Nargesi; Satyajit Ray Lifetime Achievement Award: Carlos Saura; Indian Film Personality of the Year: Chiranjeevi
- Hosted by: Government of Goa; Directorate of Film Festivals
- No. of films: international films from 73 countries; world premieres; international premieres; Asia premieres; India premieres
- Festival date: Opening: 20 November 2022; Closing: 28 November 2022
- Website: iffigoa.org

International Film Festival of India
- 54th 52nd

The 53rd International Film Festival of India was held from 20 to 28 November 2022 with Alma & Oskar by Dieter Berner as the opening feature film, and Perfect Number by Krzysztof Zanussi as the closing feature film. France was the country of focus at this edition of the festival, with eight films from that the country included in the 'country of focus' section.

== Jury ==
=== International jury ===
International Competition Jury that picked the awardees for Golden and Silver Peacocks.

- Nadav Lapid (Jury Chairperson) – writer and film director, Israel
- Jinko Gotoh – film producer, United States
- Javier Angulo Barturen – documentary filmmaker
- Pascale Chavance – editor, France
- Sudipto Sen – writer, director, India

=== Feature films ===
The Feature Film Jury, with twelve members, was headed by the acclaimed director and editor, Chairperson Vinod Ganatra. The Feature Jury constituted of the following members who individually represent various acclaimed films, and film-related professions, whereas collectively representing the diverse Indian fraternity:

- Shri. A. Karthik Raja; cinematographer
- Shri. Ananda Jyothi; musician, writer and filmmaker
- Smt. Dr. Anuradha Singh; filmmaker and editor
- Shri. Ashok Kashyap; producer, director and cinematographer
- Shri Enumula Premraj; director and screenwriter
- Smt Geeta M Gurappa; sound engineer
- Shri Imo Singh; producer, director and writer
- Shri. Jugal Debata; producer, director and cinematographer
- Shri. Sailesh Dave; producer
- Shri. Shibu G Sushelan; producer
- Shri V. N. Aditya; producer, director and screenwriter
- Shri. Vishnu Sharma; author and film critic

== Official selection ==
Year	English title	Original title	Director(s)	Production countrie(s)
Opening films
2022	Alma & Oskar		Dieter Berner	Austria
Indian Panorama feature film
2022	Hadinelentu		Prithvi Konanur	India
Indian Panorama non-feature film
2022	The Show Must Go On		Divya Cowasji	India
Mid fest film
2022	Fixation		Mercedes Bryce Morgan	Canada, United States
Closing film
2022	Perfect Number	Liczba Doskonała	Krzysztof Zanussi	Poland

== Country of focus ==
On the occasion of the 75th Anniversary of Indian Independence, India was named the 'Country of Honour' at the Marche du Cinema of the Cannes Film Festival this year. This first-ever honour, conferred on India, symbolises the significant role that cinema plays in the cultural relationship between the two countries. To reciprocate, the International Film Festival of India (IFFI Goa) featured France in the 'Country of Focus' segment.

Featuring films

Title	Original title	Director
Other People's Children (2022)	Les enfants des autres	Rebecca Zlotowski
The Crossing (2021)		Florence Mialhe
Belle and Sebastian: The Nouvelle Generation (2022)	Belle Et Sebastien, Nouvelle Génération	Pierre Coré
Between Two Worlds (2020)	Le Quai de Ouistreham	Emmanuel Carrère
The Velvet Queen (2021)		Marie Amiguet, Vincent Munier
Sixteen (2022)	Les Autres	Philippe Lioret
The Vanished President (2022)	Le Tigre et le Président	Jean-Marc Peyrefitte
The Green Perfume (2022)	Le Parfum Vert	Nicolas Pariser

== Awards and winners ==
- Golden Peacock (Best Film): The award carries a cash prize of ₹40 lakh (US$42,000) shared equally between the director and producer. The director receives the 'Golden Peacock' and a certificate in addition to the cash prize. The producer receives a certificate in addition to the cash.
- Silver Peacock:
  - Best Director: Silver Peacock, certificate and a cash prize of ₹15 lakh (US$16,000)
  - Best Actor: Silver Peacock, certificate and a cash prize of ₹10 lakh (US$10,000).
  - Best Actress: Silver Peacock, certificate and a cash prize of ₹10 lakh (US$10,000).
  - Best Debut Film of a Director: Silver Peacock, certificate and a cash prize of ₹10 lakh (US$10,000).
  - Special Jury Award: Silver Peacock, certificate and a cash prize of ₹15 lakh (US$16,000) given to a film or an individual. The award will be given to the director of the film in case a film wins the award.
  - Special Mention:
- ICFT UNESCO Gandhi Medal
- Stayajit Ray Lifetime Achievement Award
- Indian Film Personality of the Year Award

=== Winners ===
Image	Recipient	Country	Ref.
Satyajit Ray Lifetime Achievement Award
	Carlos Saura	Spain	
Indian Film Personality of the Year
	Chiranjeevi	India	

Winner(s)	Work/ director	Ref.
Golden Peacock (Best Film)
I Have Electric Dreams	Valentina Maurel	
Best Director
Nader Saeivar	No End	
Best Actor
Vahid Mobasheri	No End	
Best Actress
Daniela Marin Navarro	I Have Electric Dreams	
Best Debut Film of a Director
Behind the Haystacks	Asimina Proedrou	
Special Jury Award
Lav Diaz	When The Waves Are Gone	
Special Mention
Praveen Kandregula	Cinema Bandi	
ICFT UNESCO Gandhi Medal
Nargesi	Payam Eskandar	
