= 39th International Film Festival of India =

Indian film festival in 2008

- Awarded for: Best of World cinema
- Presented by: Directorate of Film Festivals
- Presented on: 22 November- 1 December 2008
- Official website: www.iffigoa.org
- Best Feature Film: Tulpan

The 39th International Film Festival of India was held in Panaji, Goa from 22 November to 1 December 2008.

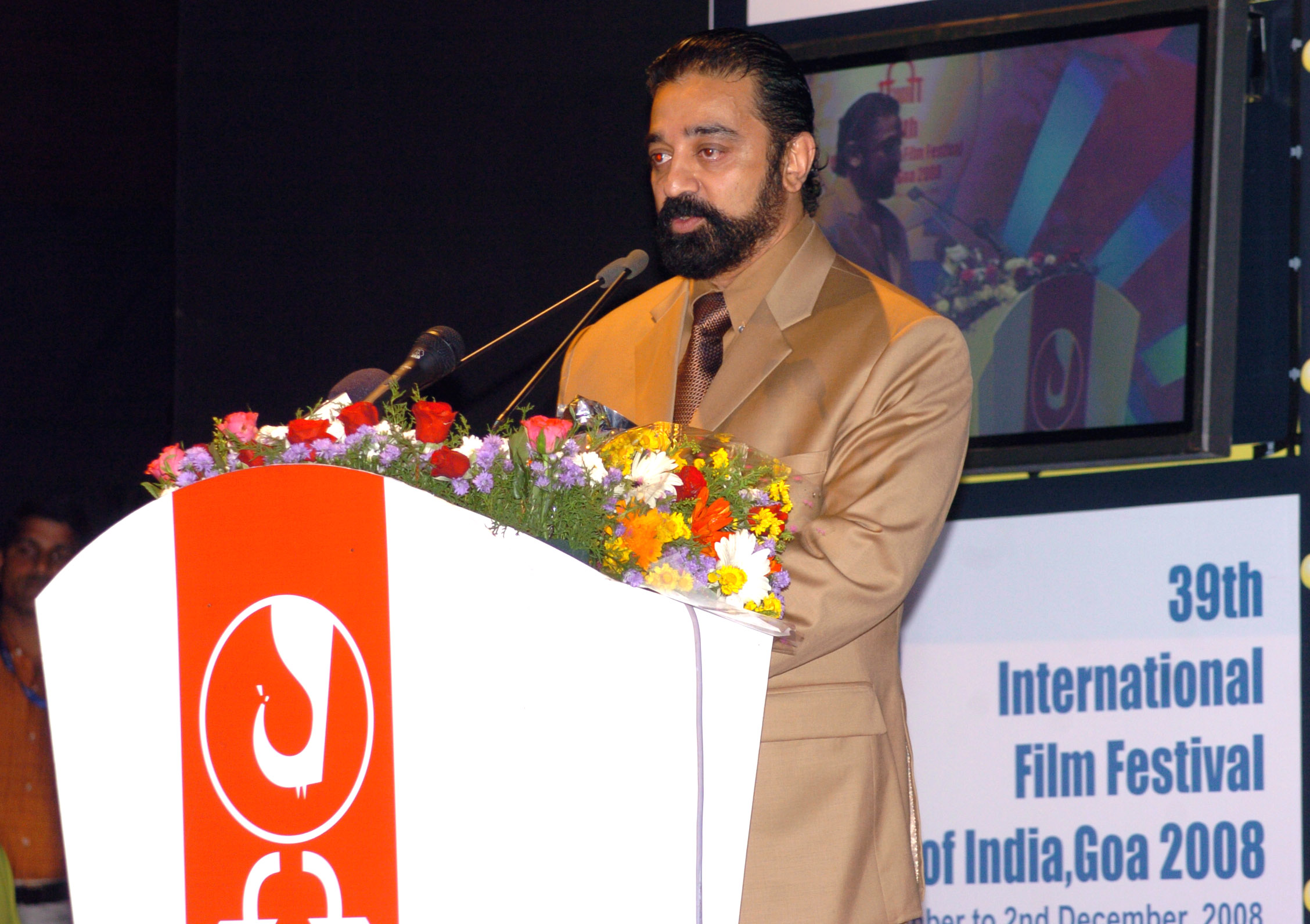
Chief guest, film actor Shri Kamal Haasan addressing the closing ceremony at the 39th IFFI at Panaji, Goa on December 02, 2008.

== Winners ==
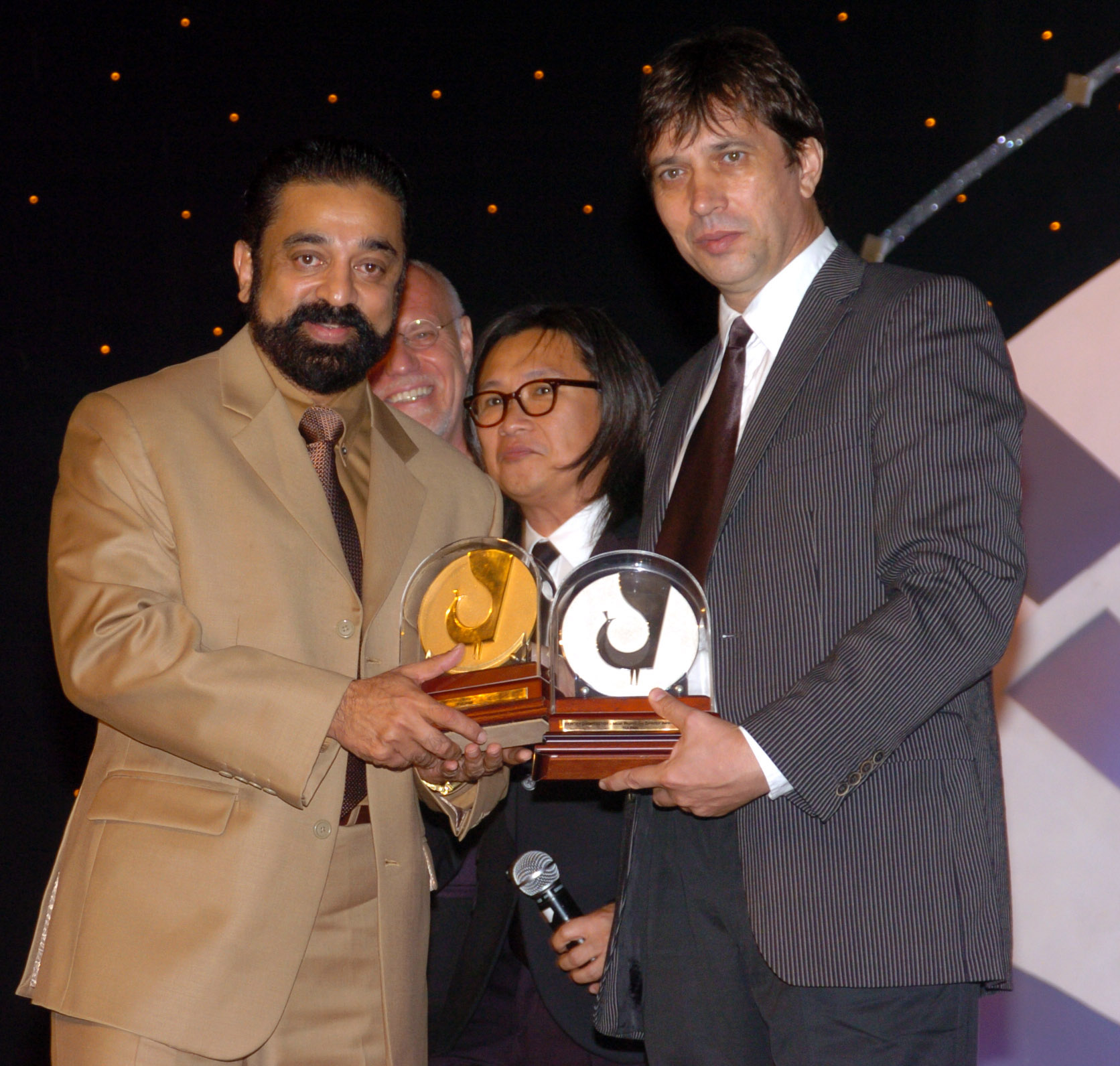
Kamal Haasan presenting the Golden Peacock award to director Sergie Dvortsevoy

- Golden Peacock (Best Film): "Tulpan" by "Sergey Dvortsevoy"
- Silver Peacock Special Jury Award: Malani Fonseka for the film "Akasa Kusum"
- Silver Peacock Award for the Most Promising Asian Director: "Sergey Dvortsevoy" for the film "Tulpan"

== Jury ==
- Niki Karimi
- Tabassum Hashmi
- Marco Mueller
- Lav Diaz
- Peter Ho-Sun Chan

== In competition ==
The competition section featured 15 films, including:

- My Mother's Tears
- Rupant
- The Shaft
- Kanchivaram
- Mahasatta
- The Song of Sparrows
- The Red Spot
- Tulpan (Golden Peacock winner)
- Pensil
- Ploning
- Akasa Kusum
- The Coffin
