= 12th International Film Festival of India =

Indian film festival in 1989

- Awarded for: Best of World cinema
- Presented by: Directorate of Film Festivals
- Official website: www.iffigoa.org

The 12th International Film Festival of India was held from 10-24 January 1989 in New Delhi. The festival was made non-competitive following a decision taken in August 1988 by the Ministry of Information and Broadcasting that festivals in future will be non-competitive and all festivals would be called International Film Festival of India (IFFI). The "Filmotsavs" and IFFI 90-91-92 together constituted 23 editions of the festival. From the 1990 edition, the IFFI was decided to be held for 10 days.
