= 44th International Film Festival of India =

Indian film festival in 2013

- Awarded for: Best of World cinema
- Presented by: Directorate of Film Festivals
- Presented on: 30 November 2013
- Hosted by: Tisca Chopra; Gulshan Devaiah
- Official website: www.iffigoa.org

Highlights
- Best Feature Film: Beatriz's War
- Lifetime achievement: Jiri Menzel

The 44th International Film Festival of India was held from 20 to 30 November 2013 in Goa.

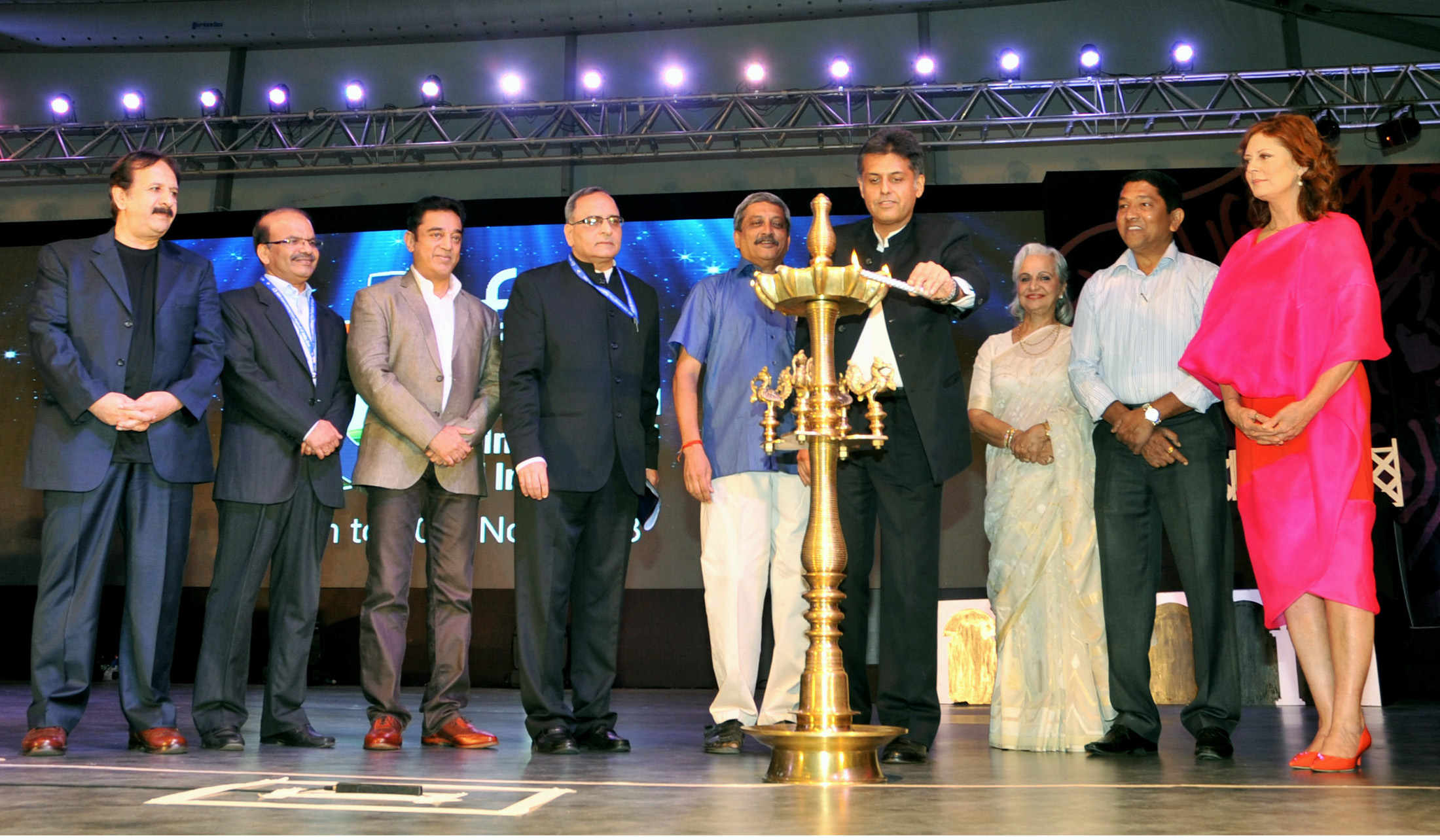
The Minister of State (Independent Charge) for Information & Broadcasting, Shri Manish Tewari lighting the lamp to inaugurate the 44th International Film Festival of India (IFFI-2013), in Panaji, Goa on November 20, 2013. The Chief Minister of Goa, Shri Manohar Parrikar, the Secretary, Ministry of Information and Broadcasting, Shri Bimal Julka, Actor Kamal Haasan, Actress Waheeda Rehman and American actress Mrs. Susan Sarandon are also seen.

== Winners ==
- Golden Peacock (Best Film): Beatriz's War by Luigi Acquisto and Bety Reis
- IFFI Best Director Award: Kaushik Ganguly for Apur Panchali
- IFFI Best Actor Award (Male): Silver Peacock Award: Alon Abutbul for "A Place in Heaven"
- IFFI Best Actor Award (Female): Silver Peacock Award: Magdalena Boczarska for In Hiding
- Silver Peacock Special Jury Award: "Thou Gild'st the Even" by Onur Ünlü (Turkish film)

== Special awards ==
- Life Time Achievement Award Jiri Menzel
- IFFI Indian Film Personality of the Year Award: Waheeda Rehman
- Centenary Award: Kamaleshwar Mukherjee for Meghe Dhaka Tara
