= 43rd International Film Festival of India =

Indian film festival in 2012

- Awarded for: Best of World cinema
- Presented by: Directorate of Film Festivals
- Presented on: 30 November 2012
- Official website: www.iffigoa.org

Highlights
- Best Feature Film: "Anhey Ghorhey Da Daan"
- Lifetime achievement: "Krzysztof Zanussi"

The 43rd International Film Festival of India was held from 20 to 30 November 2012 in Goa. Australian Director Paul Cox was the guest of honour, veteran actor Nandamuri Balakrishna was the chief guest, and Bollywood actor Akshay Kumar inaugurated the festival. Shankar Mohan was the festival director.

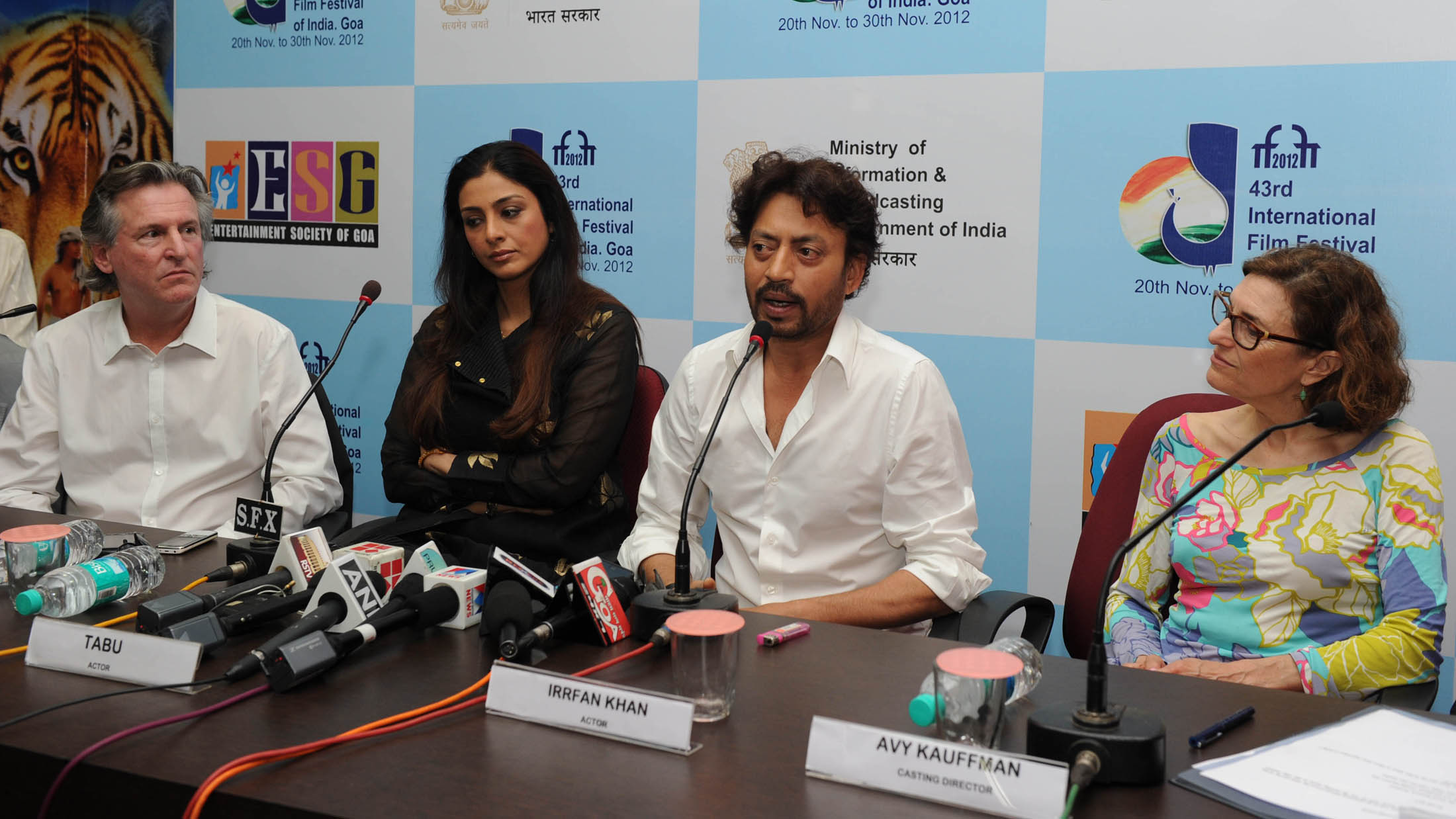
Actress Tabu (second from left) and actor Irrfan Khan (second from right) addressing a press conference at the opening for Life of Pi.

== Winners ==
- Golden Peacock (Best Film): Anhey Ghore Da Daan by Gurvinder Singh
- IFFI Best Director Award: Jeon Kyu-hwan for "The Weight"
- IFFI Best Actor Award (Male): Silver Peacock Award: Marcin Dorociński for Rose
- IFFI Best Actor Award (Female): Silver Peacock Award: Anjali Patil for Oba Nathuwa Oba Ekka
- Silver Peacock Special Jury Award: Lucy Mulloy for Una Noche

== Special awards ==
- Life Time Achievement Award - Krzysztof Zanussi
- Centenary Award - Meera Nair for The Reluctant Fundamentalist

== Official selections ==
=== Opening film ===
- Life of Pi by Ang Lee

=== Closing film ===
- The Reluctant Fundamentalist by Meera Nair
