= 8th International Film Festival of India =

Indian film festival in 1981

- Awarded for: Best of World cinema
- Presented by: Directorate of Film Festivals
- Presented on: 16 January 1981
- Official website: www.iffigoa.org
- Best Feature Film: "The Unknown Soldier’s Patent Leather Shoes" "Aakrosh"

The 8th International Film Festival of India was held from 3–16 January 1981 in New Delhi, India.

== Winners ==
- Golden Peacock (Best Film): "The Unknown Soldier’s Patent Leather Shoes" (1979) by Rangel Valchanov and "Aakrosh" (1980) by Govind Nihalani
- Golden Peacock (Best Short Film) "A Period of Transition" (1980 Denmark film)
