= 29th International Film Festival of India =

Indian film festival in 1998

- Awarded for: Best of World cinema
- Presented by: Directorate of Film Festivals
- Presented on: 20 January 1998
- Official website: www.iffigoa.org
- Best Feature Film: "The King of Masks"

The 29th International Film Festival of India was held from 10 to 20 January 1998 in New Delhi. The competitive edition was restricted to Asian directors.

== Winners ==
- Golden Peacock (Best Film): Golden Peacock Award: "The King of Masks" by Wu Tianming (Chinese film)
- Silver Peacock (Best Film): Best Film: Silver Peacock Award: "Paper Airplanes" by Farhad Mehhranfar (Iranian film)
- Silver Peacock Special Jury Award: "Adajya" by Santwana Bardoloi (Assamese film)
