= 34th International Film Festival of India =

Indian film festival in 2003

- Awarded for: Best of World cinema
- Presented by: Directorate of Film Festivals
- Presented on: 19 October 2003
- Official website: www.iffigoa.org

Highlights
- Best Feature Film: "At Five in the Afternoon"
- Lifetime achievement: "Liv Ullmann"

The 34th International Film Festival of India was held from 9 to 19 October 2003 in New Delhi. The competitive edition was restricted to films by Asian directors. Neelam Kapur was the festival director, and veteran actor Kamal Haasan the chief guest.

== Winners ==
- Life Time Achievement Award - "Liv Ullmann"
- Golden Peacock (Best Film): "At Five in the Afternoon" by "Samira Makhmalbaf" (Iranian film)
- Silver Peacock Award for the Most Promising Asian Director: "Ra'anan Alexandrowicz" for "James' Journey to Jerusalem" (Israeli film)
- Silver Peacock Special Jury Award: "Prohor" by "Subhadro Chowdhury" (Bengali film)
