= 37th International Film Festival of India =

Indian film festival in 2006

- Awarded for: Best of World cinema
- Presented by: Directorate of Film Festivals
- Presented on: December 3 2006
- Official website: www.iffigoa.org
- Best Feature Film: "The Old Barber" (Le Vieux Barbier)"

The 37th International Film Festival of India was held from November 23 to December 3 2006 in Goa. The jury, headed by Australian director Rolf de Heer, consisted of French director Olivier Assayas, Polish actress Grażyna Szapołowska, Argentinian actress Leticia Bredice and India's Jahnu Barua.

The Technical Retrospective was instituted this year, covering Digital Editing-related topics, including a film ‘Cutting Edge’ followed by a presentation by Editor Steven Cohen, while special presentations by technicians from Italy on film restoration and digital animation.

The festival paid Homage to 11 Indian film personalities. These include Nadira, Actress, Naushad Ali, Music Director, Oduvil Unnikrishnan, Actor, Malayalam Cinema, P. Bhanumathi, Actress, Dancer, Director, Writer, Telugu and Tamil Cinema, Padmini, Actress, Hrishikesh Mukherjee, Dr. Rajkumar, renowned Kannada Actor, Srividya, Tamil/Malayalam Actress, Ustad Bismillah Khan, Parveen Babi and young Punjabi Film Director and two times National Award winner, Manoj Punj.

A new section "NFDC Down The Ages" featuring 6 films including Gandhi and Jaane Bhi Do Yaaro celebrated the contributions of National Film Development Corporation.

== Winners ==
- Golden Peacock (Best Film): "The Old Barber" (Le Vieux Barbier)" by "Hasi Chaolu" (Chinese film)
- Silver Peacock Award for the Most Promising Asian Director: "An Kung-Lee" for " A Short Life" (South Korean film)
- Silver Peacock Special Jury Award: "Nirontor" by "Abu Sayeed" (Bangladeshi film).

== Official selections ==
=== Opening film ===
- Volver by Pedro Almodovar (Spanish film)

=== Closing film ===
- Babel by Alejandro Gonzalez Inarritu (American film).
