= IFFI Satyajit Ray Lifetime Achievement Award =

Indian film festival award

- International honor for contributions to World cinema
- Awarded for: "Outstanding contribution to the growth and development of World cinema"
- Sponsored by: International Film Festival of India
- Formerly called: IFFI Lifetime Achievement Award
- Reward: ₹10,00,000/-
- First award: 1999
- Final award: 2025

Highlights
- Most recent winner: Rajinikanth
- First winner: Bernardo Bertolucci

The IFFI Satyajit Ray Lifetime Achievement Award (formerly IFFI Lifetime Achievement Award) is an international honor instituted by the International Film Festival of India. The recipient is honored for their "outstanding contribution to the growth and development of World cinema.

== Background ==
The award was first instituted in 1999 at the 30th IFFI. During the 52nd IFFI edition in 2021, on the occasion of the birth centenary of Satyajit Ray, the Directorate of Film Festivals in recognition of the auteur’s legacy, "The IFFI Lifetime Achievement award" was rechristened to "IFFI - Satyajit Ray Lifetime Achievement Award".

Phillip Noyce, a film and television director from Australia was the recipient of the award in the 2024.

== Recipients ==
The Satyajit Ray Lifetime Achievement Award is an honor given at India's International Film Festival of India (IFFI) to filmmakers for their significant contributions to world cinema, named after the Indian director. Instituted in 1999 and renamed in 2021 for Ray's birth centenary, past recipients include Martin Scorsese, Wong Kar-wai, Dilip Kumar, Phillip Noyce and in 2025 the great Indian Actor Rajnikanth.

== Erstwhile Lifetime Achievement Award (1999–2020) ==
Edition	Awardee	Nationality	Craft
30th	Bernardo Bertolucci	Italian	Film director, producer, screenwriter, and actor
34th	Liv Ullmann	Norwegian	Film director, and actress
38th	Dilip Kumar	Indian	Actor
38th	Lata Mangeshkar	Indian	Singer
42nd	Bertrand Tavernier	French	Film director, producer, screenwriter, and actor
43rd	Krzysztof Zanussi	Polish	Film director, producer, and screenwriter
44th	Jiří Menzel	Czech	Film director, producer, screenwriter, and actor
45th	Wong Kar-wai	Hong Kong	Film director, producer, screenwriter
46th	Nikita Mikhalkov	Russian	Film director, producer, screenwriter, and actor
47th	Im Kwon-taek	South Korean	Film director
48th	Atom Egoyan	Canadian	Film director
49th	Dan Wolman	Israeli / Palestinian	Film director
50th	Isabelle Huppert	French	Actress
51st	Vittorio Storaro	Italian	Cinematographer

== Satyajit Ray Lifetime Achievement Award (since 2021) ==
Edition	Awardee	Nationality	Craft
52nd	Martin Scorsese	American	Film director, producer, screenwriter, and actor
52nd	István Szabó	Hungarian	Film director
53rd	Carlos Saura	Spanish	Film director, producer, photographer, and actor
54th	Michael Douglas	American	Film director, producer and Actor
55th	Phillip Noyce	Australian	Film and television director
56th	Rajnikanth	Indian	Actor
