= 36th International Film Festival of India =

Indian film festival in 2005

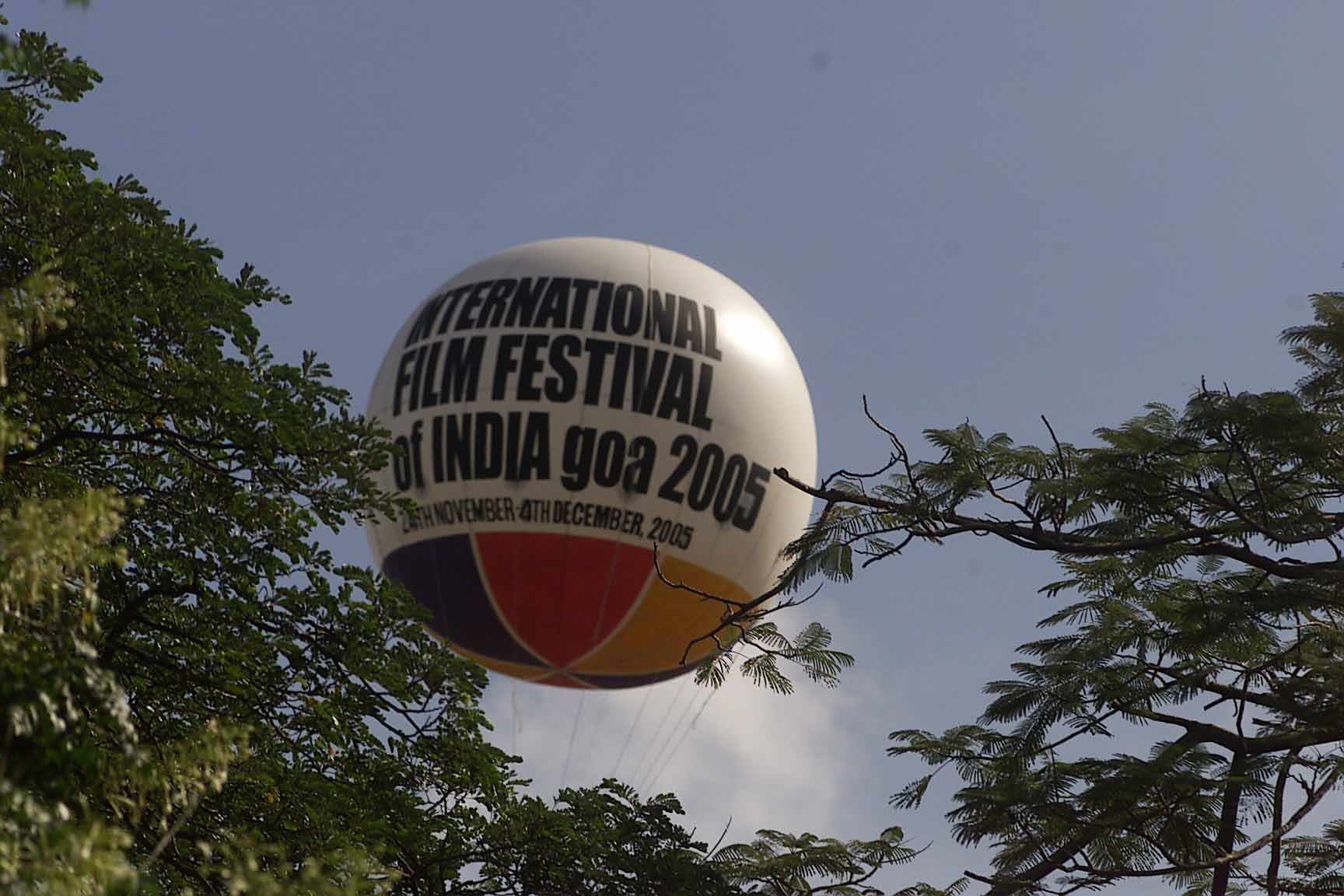
- Awarded for: Best of World cinema
- Presented by: Directorate of Film Festivals
- Presented on: December 4, 2005
- Official website: www.iffigoa.org
- Best Feature Film: "Iron Island"

The 36th International Film Festival of India was held from November 24 to December 4, 2005 in Goa. The edition focused on French cinema. Veteran actors Dev Anand and Chiranjeevi inaugurated the edition. The 36th edition was for the first time executed by Wizcraft International Entertainment Pvt Ltd. The jury consisted of Latin American filmmaker Miguel Littin, French director Alain Corneau, Indian filmmaker Saeed Mirza, Iranian actor-director Faramarz Gharibian and Austrian filmmaker Sabine Derflinger.

== Winners ==
- Golden Peacock (Best Film): "Iron Island" by "Mohammad Rasoulof" (Iranian film)
- Silver Peacock Award for the Most Promising Asian Director: "Vera Fogwill" and "Martin Desalvo" for "Kept and Dreamless" (Argentinian film)
- Silver Peacock Special Jury Award: "Red Dust" by "Tom Hooper" (South African film).

== Official selections ==
=== Closing film ===
- "L'Enfant" by "Jean-Pierre" and "Luc Dardenne"
