= 31st International Film Festival of India =

Indian film festival in 2000

- Awarded for: Best of World cinema
- Presented by: Directorate of Film Festivals
- Presented on: 10-20 January 2000
- Official website: www.iffigoa.org
- Best Feature Film: "Karunam" "The Railroad Man"

The 31st International Film Festival of India was held from 10 to 20 January 2000 in New Delhi. The competitive edition was restricted to films by "Asian directors". The follow-up 32nd IFFI edition was cancelled due to interim decision.

== Winners ==
- Golden Peacock (Best Film): Karunam" by Jayaraj (Indian film)
  "The Railroad Man"by Yasuo Furuhata (Japanese film)
- Silver Peacock Award for the Most Promising Asian Director: "Nang Nak" (Indonesia, Nonzee Nimibutr)
- Silver Peacock Special Jury Award: "Postmen in the Mountains" by Huo Jianqi (China)

== International Jury ==
- Mrinal Sen
- Abbas Kiarostami
- Joao Batista de Andrade
- Joan Dupont
- Jean Claude Carriere
