= 9th International Film Festival of India =

Indian film festival in 1983

- Awarded for: Best of World cinema
- Presented by: Directorate of Film Festivals
- Presented on: 16 January 1983
- Official website: www.iffigoa.org

The 9th International Film Festival of India was held from 3 to 16 January 1983 in New Delhi. The festival introduced a new section for the screening of 16mm films. With films from 22 Third World countries participating in the edition, it became a major forum of Third World cinema. For the first time, the Golden Peacock Awards for Best feature film, and short film were not awarded in the competition section.

== Winners ==
- Golden Peacock (Best Film): Not Awarded
- Golden Peacock (Best Short Film) Not Awarded
