= 46th International Film Festival of India =

2015 event in Goa, India

- Awarded for: Best of World cinema
- Presented by: Directorate of Film Festivals
- Presented on: 30, November 2015
- Hosted by: Kabir Bedi; Lillete Dubey
- Official website: www.iffigoa.org

Highlights
- Best Feature Film: Embrace of the Serpent
- Lifetime achievement: Nikita Mikhalkov

The 46th International Film Festival of India was held from 20 to 30 November 2015 in Goa. The International Jury was headed by the chairperson, Shekhar Kapur along with UK-based director Micheal Radford, Palestine-based Israel director Suha Arraf, German actress Julia Jentsch and South Korean filmmaker Jeon Kyu-Hwan. The 13-member Feature Jury was headed by Chairperson, Aribam Syam Sharma, while the 7-member Non-Feature jury was led by Chairperson, Rajendra Janglay.

== Winners ==
- Golden Peacock (Best Film): Embrace of the Serpent by Ciro Guerra
- IFFI Best Director Award: Peter Greenaway for "Eisenstein in Guanajuato"
- IFFI Best Actor Award (Male): Silver Peacock Award: Vincent Lindon for "The Measure of a Man"
- IFFI Best Actor Award (Female): Silver Peacock Award: Gunes Sensoy, Doga Doguslu, Tugba Sunguroglu, Elit İşcan and İlayda Akdoğan for "Mustang"
- Silver Peacock Special Jury Award: Sealed Cargo by Julia Vargas-Weise
- Special Mention: for "Enclave" by Goran Radovaovic

== Special awards ==
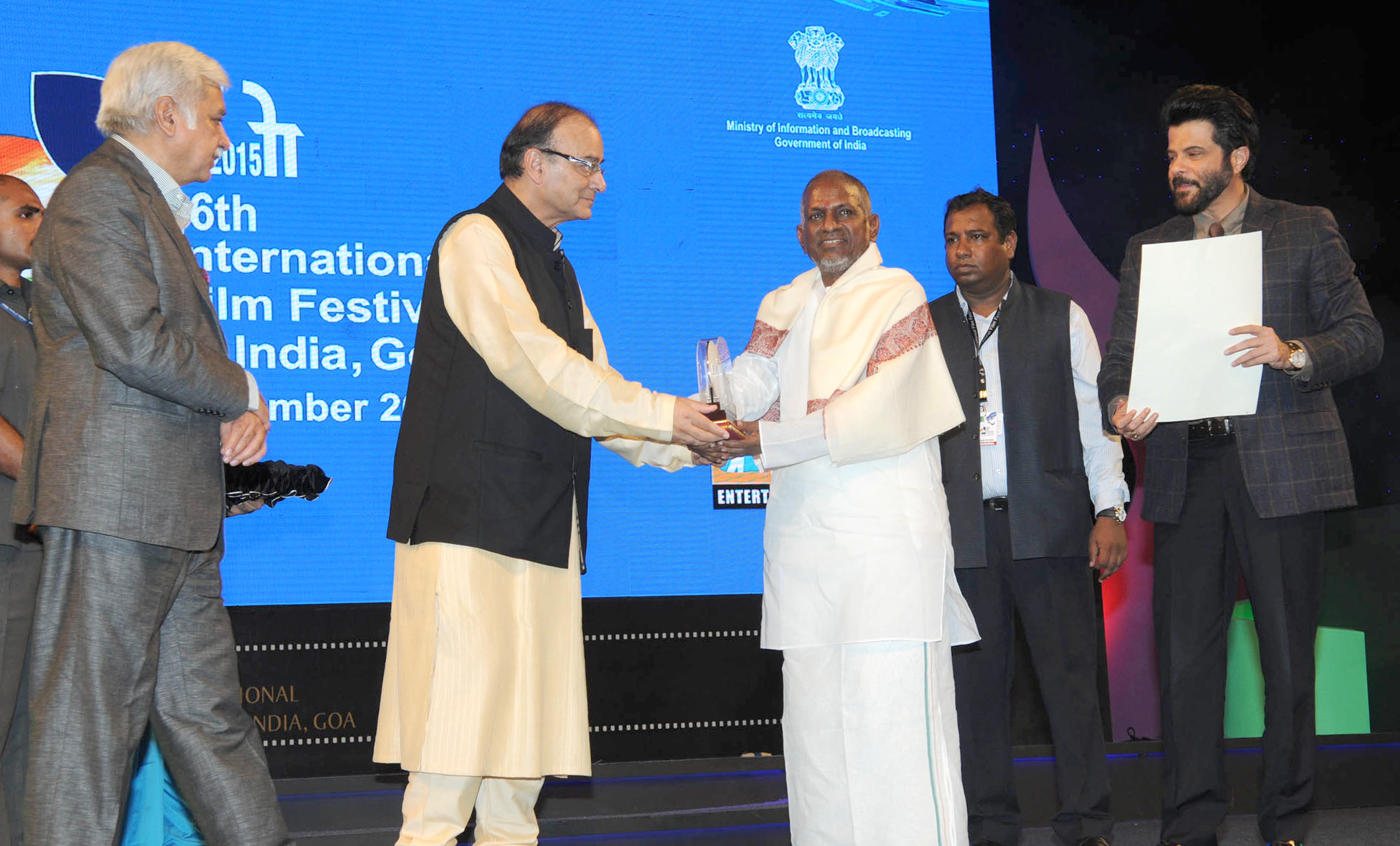
Arun Jaitley presents the Indian Film Personality of the year to Ilayaraja at 46th International Film Festival

- IFFI ICFT UNESCO Gandhi Medal: Kaushik Ganguly for Cinemawala
- Life Time Achievement Award - Nikita Mikhalkov, Oscar-winning Russian actor-filmmaker
- IFFI Indian Film Personality of the Year Award: Ilaiyaraaja

== Official selections ==
=== Opening film ===
"The Man Who Knew Infinity"

=== Closing film ===
"The Clan"
