= 4th International Film Festival of India =

Indian film festival in 1969

- Awarded for: Best of World cinema
- Presented by: Directorate of Film Festivals
- Presented on: 18 December 1969
- Official website: www.iffigoa.org
- Best Feature Film: "The Damned"

The 4th International Film Festival of India was held from 5 to 18 December 1969 in New Delhi. Films from 34 countries participated in the "4th IFFI", which was inaugurated by the then President of India V. V. Giri. The honors were classified under three sections - films as art, films as communication, and special short films from this edition featuring a total of 151 films. A nine member jury was chaired by Raj Kapoor, R. K. Narayan, and Swedish filmmaker Mai Zetterling.

== Winners ==
Golden Peacock

- Golden Peacock (Best Film): "The Damned" by Luchino Visconti (Italian film)
- Golden Peacock (Best Short Film) "Taking off at 1800 Hours" (Cuban film)

Silver Peacock

- Best Short Film "Man and the Crow" by Sugathapala Senarath Yapa (Srilankan film)
- Special Jury Awards to Lester James Peries for "Golu Hadawatha" (Srilankan film); Mrinal Sen for "Bhuvan Shome" (Indian film); Sobhan Babu for "Bangaru Panjaram" (Indian film)
