= 35th International Film Festival of India =

Indian film festival in 2004

- Awarded for: Best of World cinema
- Presented by: Directorate of Film Festivals
- Presented on: December 9 2004
- Official website: www.iffigoa.org
- Best Feature Film: "The Beautiful City"

The 35th International Film Festival of India was held from November 29 to December 9 2004 in Goa. The edition is the first globally competitive edition with a permanent venue at Goa. The "Beach Screening" section of Hollywood blockbusters was instituted at IFFI for the first time at this edition.

== Winners ==
- Golden Peacock (Best Film): The Beautiful City by Asghar Farhadi (Iranian film)
- Special Jury Award: Silver Peacock: Actor Faramarz Gharibian for The Beautiful City
- Silver Peacock Award for the Most Promising Asian Director: Ekachai Uekrongtham for Beautiful Boxer (Thai film)
- Silver Peacock Special Jury Award: Old Women by Gennady Sidorov (Russian film)

== Official selections ==
=== Opening film ===
- “Vanity Fair” by "Meera Nair"

=== Closing film ===
- "Alexander" by "Oliver Stone"
