= 45th International Film Festival of India =

Indian film festival in 2014

- Awarded for: Best of World cinema
- Presented by: Directorate of Film Festivals
- Presented on: 30 November 2014
- Official website: www.iffigoa.org

Highlights
- Best Feature Film: "Leviathan"
- Lifetime achievement: "Wong Kar-wai"

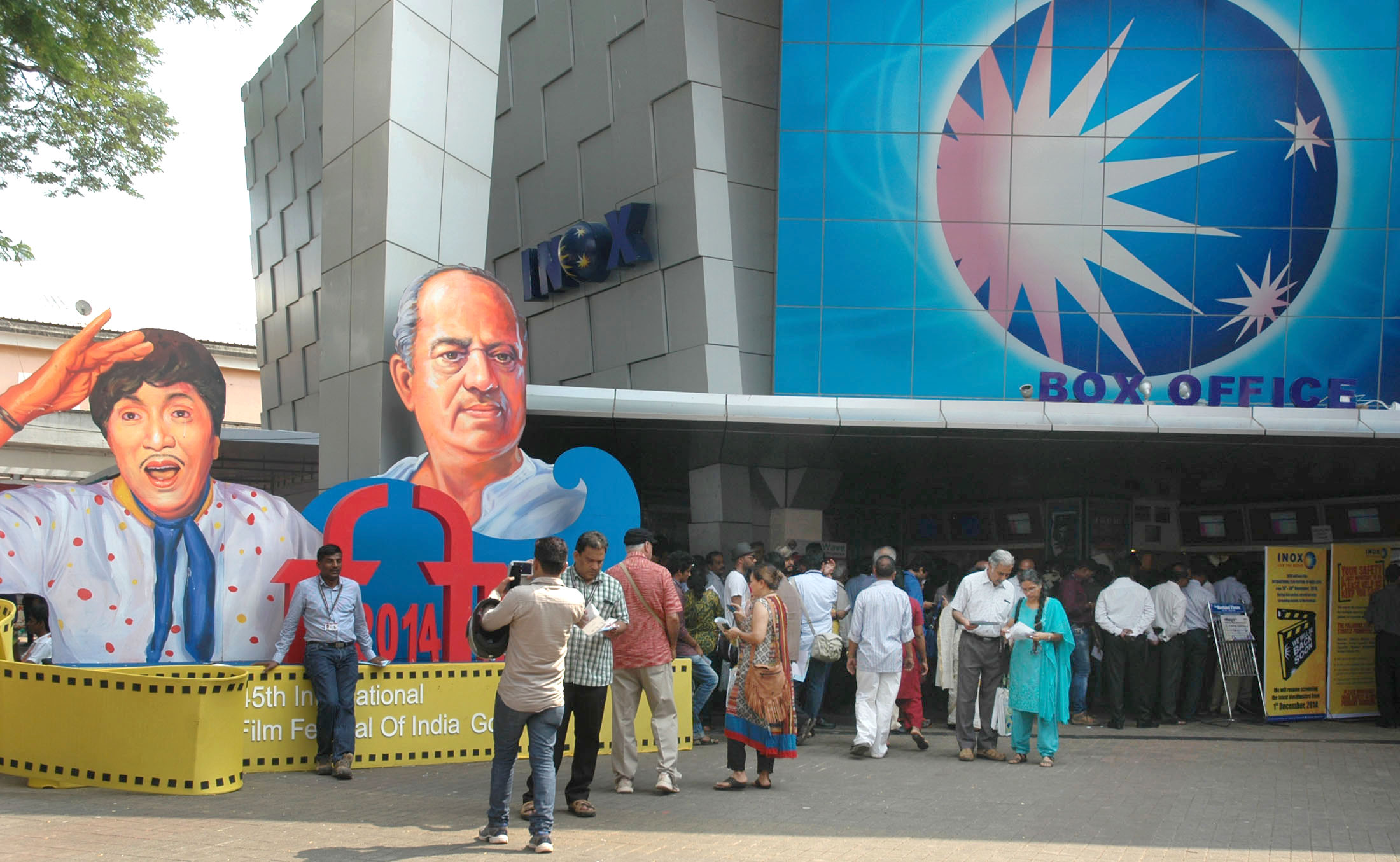
A view of ‘INOX’ Multiplex Theatre, which is one of the venues for the 45th International Film Festival of India (IFFI-2014), in Panaji, Goa on November 20, 2014.

The 45th International Film Festival of India was held from 20 to 30 November 2014 in Goa. China was the focus country for this edition of the festival.

== Winners ==
- Golden Peacock (Best Film): "Leviathan" by "Andrey Zvyagintsev"
- Silver Peacock (Best Film): "Ek Hazarachi Note" by Shrihari Sathe
- IFFI Best Director Award: Nadav Lapid for "The Kindergarten Teacher"
- IFFI Best Actor Award (Male): Silver Peacock Award: Aleksei Serebryakov for "Leviathan" and Dulal Sarkar for "Chotoder Chobi".
- IFFI Best Actor Award (Female): Silver Peacock Award: Alina Rodriguez for "Behavior" and Sarit Larry for "The Kindergarten Teacher"

== Special awards ==
- Centenary Award for "Ek Hazarachi Note" by Shrihari Sathe
- Life Time Achievement Award - Wong Kar-wai
- IFFI Indian Film Personality of the Year Award: Rajinikanth

== Official selections ==
=== Opening film ===
- The President, directed by Mohsen Makhmalbaf (Iran)

=== Closing film ===
- The Grandmaster, by Wong Kar-wai (China)
