= 5th International Film Festival of India =

Indian film festival in 1975

- Awarded for: Best of World cinema
- Presented by: Directorate of Film Festivals
- Presented on: 12 January 1975
- Official website: www.iffigoa.org
- Best Feature Film: "Dreaming Youth"

The 5th International Film Festival of India was held from 30 December 1974 to 12 January 1975 in New Delhi. At this edition, a permanent insignia for the festival, representing a peacock, India's national bird, was adopted, with a permanent motto of the festival "Vasudhaiva Kutumbakam" (The whole world is a family). The same year it was also decided to hold a non-competitive festival of films "Filmotsav" alternating with IFFI.

== Winners ==
- Golden Peacock (Best Film): "Dreaming Youth" by János Rózsás (Hungarian Film)
- Golden Peacock (Best Short Film): "Automatic" (Czechoslovakin film)
