= 27th International Film Festival of India =

Indian film festival in 1996

- Awarded for: Best of World cinema
- Presented by: Directorate of Film Festivals
- Presented on: 20 January 1996
- Official website: www.iffigoa.org
- Best Feature Film: "Blush"

The 27th International Film Festival of India was held from 10 to 20 January 1996 in New Delhi. The competitive edition was restricted to "Asian Women Directors".

Madan Lal Khurana was appointed director of the festival, which was inaugurated by filmmaker B. R. Chopra.

== Winners ==
- Golden Peacock (Best Film): "Blush" by "Li Shaohong"
