= 42nd International Film Festival of India =

Indian film festival in 2011

- Awarded for: Best of World cinema
- Presented by: Directorate of Film Festivals
- Presented on: 30 November 2011
- Hosted by: Rahul Khanna; Tisca Chopra
- Official website: www.iffigoa.org

Highlights
- Best Feature Film: "Porfirio"
- Lifetime achievement: "Bertrand Tavernier"

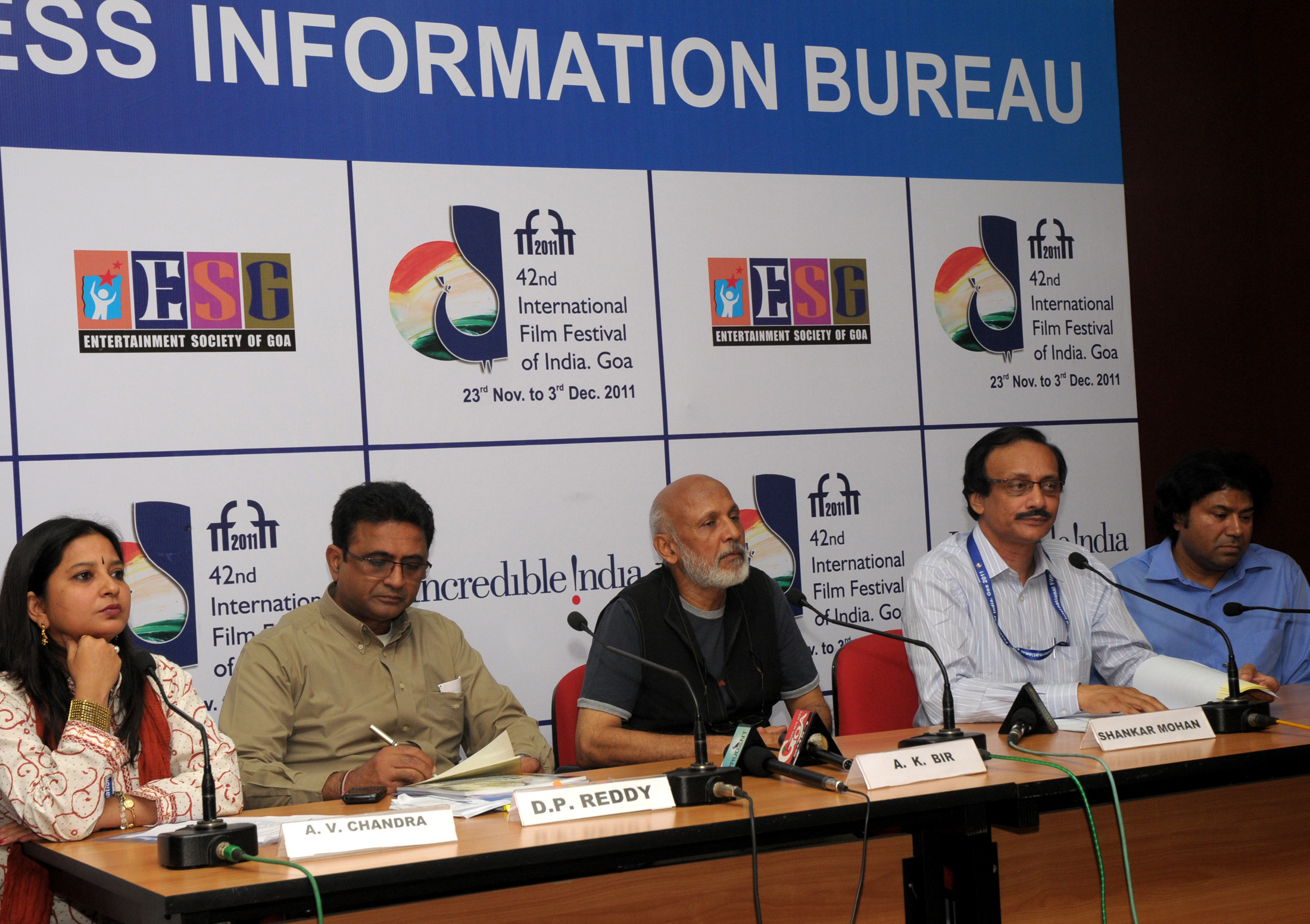
Filmmaker Shri A.K. Bir (center) at the unveiling of the catalogues detailing the feature and non-feature programmes on November 22, 2011.

The 42nd International Film Festival of India was held from 23 to 30 November 2011 in Goa. The International competition (Feature) was chaired by Adoor Gopalakrishnan, and the Short film competition by Basu Bhattacharya. For the first time the 42d IFFI had launched its own poster with a depiction of fest motif "Peacock", made as a "dancing peacock" by veteran film design and art consultant Thotta Tharani. The IFFI signature film was conceptualized by veteran film maker Shaji Karun. New sections such as “Kaleidoscope”, 3 D, Animation, European discoveries, Master Classes and Russian Classics were included, along with the inaugural Best Director Award. Indian actor Shah Rukh Khan was the chief guest for the festival.

== Winners ==
- Golden Peacock (Best Film): "Porfirio" by "Alejandro Landes"
- IFFI Best Director Award: Asghar Farhadi for "A Separation"
- IFFI Best Actor Award (Male): Silver Peacock Award: Sasson Gabai for "Restoration"
- IFFI Best Actor Award (Female): Silver Peacock Award: Nadezhda Markina for "Elena"
- Silver Peacock Special Jury Award: Salim Ahamed for "Adaminte Makan Abu"
- Life Time Achievement Award - "Bertrand Tavernier"

== Other Awards ==
- Vasudha award for “A Pestering Journey” by K. R. Manoj
- Second prize of Golden Lamp Tree: “Another Planet” by Smita Bhide
- Silver Lamp Tree award: “Crazy Beats Strong Every Time’ by Mool Monson
- International Jury Prize: “Khule Darwaze” by Ashish Pande
- Special Jury Prize: "Anthony Gonsolves" by Ashok Rane.

== Official selections ==
=== Opening film ===
- “The Lady” by Luc Besson

=== Closing film ===
- "The Consul of Bordeaux” by Francisco Manso and Joao Correa
