= 10th International Film Festival of India =

Indian film festival in 1985

- Awarded for: Best of World cinema
- Presented by: Directorate of Film Festivals
- Presented on: 16 January 1985
- Official website: www.iffigoa.org
- Best Feature Film: "The Bostonians" "Ruthless Romance"

The 10th International Film Festival of India was held from 3 to 16 January 1985 in New Delhi. For the first time, the festival had an international panorama of select short films, and documentaries, in an effort to create an identity for short films. In 1986 when "Filmotsav" 86 was held in Calcutta, the festival dates were changed from 3-17 January to 10-24 January.

== Winners ==
- Golden Peacock (Best Film): The Bostonians by James Ivory
  Ruthless Romance by Eldar Ryazanov
- Golden Peacock (Best Short Film) Narcissus (Canadian film)
