= Tulpan =

- Theatrical release poster
- Russian: Тюльпан
- Literally: The Tulip
- Directed by: Sergey Dvortsevoy
- Written by: Sergey Dvortsevoy; Gennady Ostrovskiy
- Produced by: Karl Baumgartner; Thanassis Karathanos; Yelena Yatsura
- Starring: Askhat Kuchinchirekov; Samal Yeslyamova; Ondasyn Besikbasov; Tulepbergen Baisakalov; Bereke Turganbayev; Nurzhigit Zhapabayev; Mahabbat Turganbayeva
- Cinematography: Jola Dylewska PSC
- Edited by: Isabel Meier; Petar Markovic
- Distributed by: Zeitgeist Films
- Release dates: May 23, 2008 (Cannes Film Festival); April 9, 2009 (Kazakhstan)
- Running time: 100 minutes
- Countries: Kazakhstan; Russia
- Languages: Kazakh; Russian

Tulpan (Russian: Тюльпан, lit. 'The Tulip') is a 2008 Kazakh drama film. It was directed by Sergey Dvortsevoy and distributed by Zeitgeist Films. Tulpan was Kazakhstan's 2009 Academy Awards official submission to Foreign Language Film category, but it didn't make the final shortlist. It won the award for Best Film at the 2nd Asia Pacific Screen Awards.

== Overview ==
Asa, a recently discharged Russian Navy sailor, is living in the remote Kazakhstan steppe with his sister Samal, her older husband, Ondas, and their three children. He dreams of becoming a herdsman and owning his own ranch, but he believes that to attain this goal, he must first marry. Asa hopes to marry Tulpan, the daughter of a neighboring family and the only eligible young woman in the area. However, her parents are unwilling to see their daughter marry an unemployed man with few prospects and Tulpan herself appears to have little interest in Asa. The plot of the story follows the trials of Asa, his surrogate family, and his western culture-loving friend Boni.

== Development ==
Director Sergey Dvortsevoy was born in Kazakhstan, lived there for 28 years working for an aviation company, and was very familiar with Kazakhstan's countryside. In an interview at the New York Film Festival he revealed how he had always wanted to tell a story about such a barren setting. Dvortsevoy has said that the people who live in the Hunger Steppe have always intrigued him; in the interview he revealed how he has always noticed an inner balance to the people that live in this part of the world, a happiness despite subjective adversity that has always interested him. Casting for the film took many, many months, and Dvortsevoy recalls having sent crews with small cameras to nearly every city in Kazakhstan in search of the right cast members. Having found them, he made the main cast (Asa, Samal, Ondas, Beke, Maha and Nuka) live in the yurt depicted in the film for one month before filming. In the interview, Dvortsevoy described how the story came together, 20 percent of the film was from his original script while the other 80 percent came about from a real-time reworked script based on the circumstances and conditions that arose on location. Dvortsevoy rehearsed all of the sequences with the animals or on the tractor, but the emotional scenes were rehearsed without dialogue and only fully performed at the time of filming. Samal, who played Asa's sister and the mother of the children, was the only professional actress on set having worked on stage in the theatre, however at the time of filming she was only nineteen years old. Still "only a child herself", she struggled to grow accustomed to the household chores and motherly duties during her month living in the yurt. Askhat Kuchinchirekov, the actor who portrayed Asa, was not a professional but still a student at one of the film schools in Kazakhstan. The three children were able to rehearse scenes to different degrees with the exception of Nurzhigit Zhapabayev, the little boy who played Nuka, who Dvortsevoy simply "let loose" to be as wild and natural as one of the "animals".

== Reception ==
=== Critical response ===
The film was well received. Tulpan has an approval rating of 96% on review aggregator website Rotten Tomatoes, based on 71 reviews, and an average rating of 7.7/10. The website's critical consensus states, "Kazakh sheep herders get their cinematic due in this lovely, unsentimental debut from director Sergei Dvortsevoy". Metacritic assigned the film a weighted average score of 88 out of 100, based on 16 critics, indicating "universal acclaim".Roger Ebert gave it four stars and praised it in his review, calling it "an amazing film" set in an unfamiliar world that "might as well be Mars". Upon the film's initial release in Kazakhstan, at a special screening of 1500 people, although it was praised by the herdsmen and rural folk depicted in the film, it was criticized and looked down upon by some Kazakhstan government officials, who felt that the film portrayed an even more degrading picture of Kazakhstan than Borat.

Internationally the film was a great success doing well at some of the world's most prestigious film festivals. The film has been praised for its poetic realism, the relationships and depth sustained by its characters, the film's simplicity, patience, and care for its subject matter, and also for its depiction of a world that is seemingly lost in time and space, increasingly fading away more and more into the past.

=== Awards and nominations ===
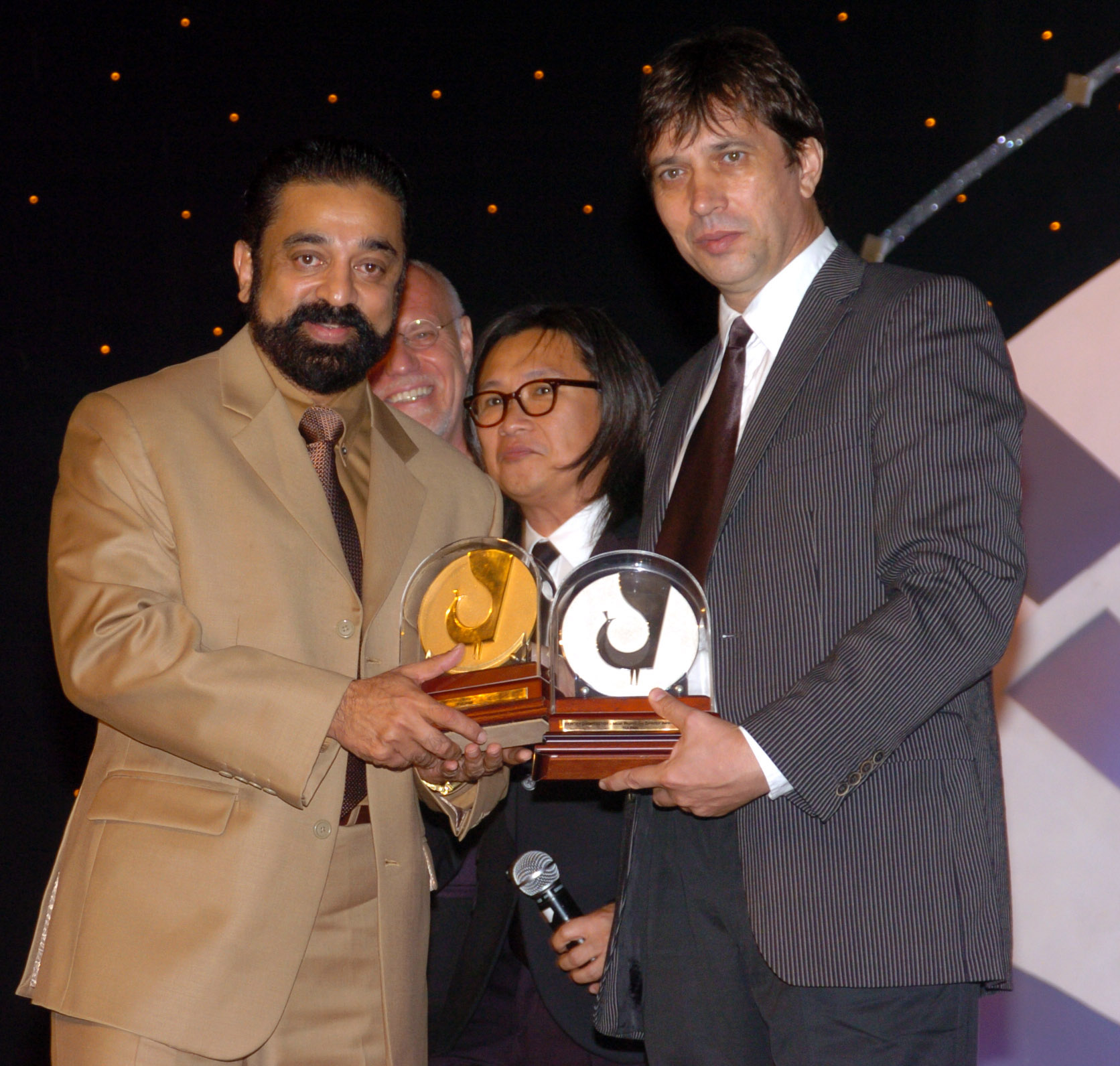
Indian film Actor Kamal Haasan presenting the Golden Peacock award to Director Sergie Dvortsevoy at the 2008 International Film Festival of India

- Winner of the Prix Un Certain Regard at the 2008 Cannes Film Festival
- Winner, 2008 Sutherland Trophy
- Winner, Best Feature Film, at the 2008 Montreal Festival of New Cinema (Festival du nouveau cinema)
- Kazakhstan's 2009 Academy Awards official submission for the Foreign-Language Film category
- Winner, Best Feature Film - Asia Pacific Screen Awards 2008
- Nominated, Achievement in Directing - Asia Pacific Screen Awards 2008
- Winner of Golden Peacock (Best Film) at the 39th International Film Festival
- Winner of the Golden Puffin at the 2008 Reykjavík International Film Festival
- Special Prize for Best Director at the 2008 East European Film Festival Cottbus

== See also ==
- List of submissions to the 81st Academy Awards for Best Foreign Language Film
- List of Kazakhstani submissions for the Academy Award for Best Foreign Language Film
