= 47th International Film Festival of India =

Indian film festival in 2016

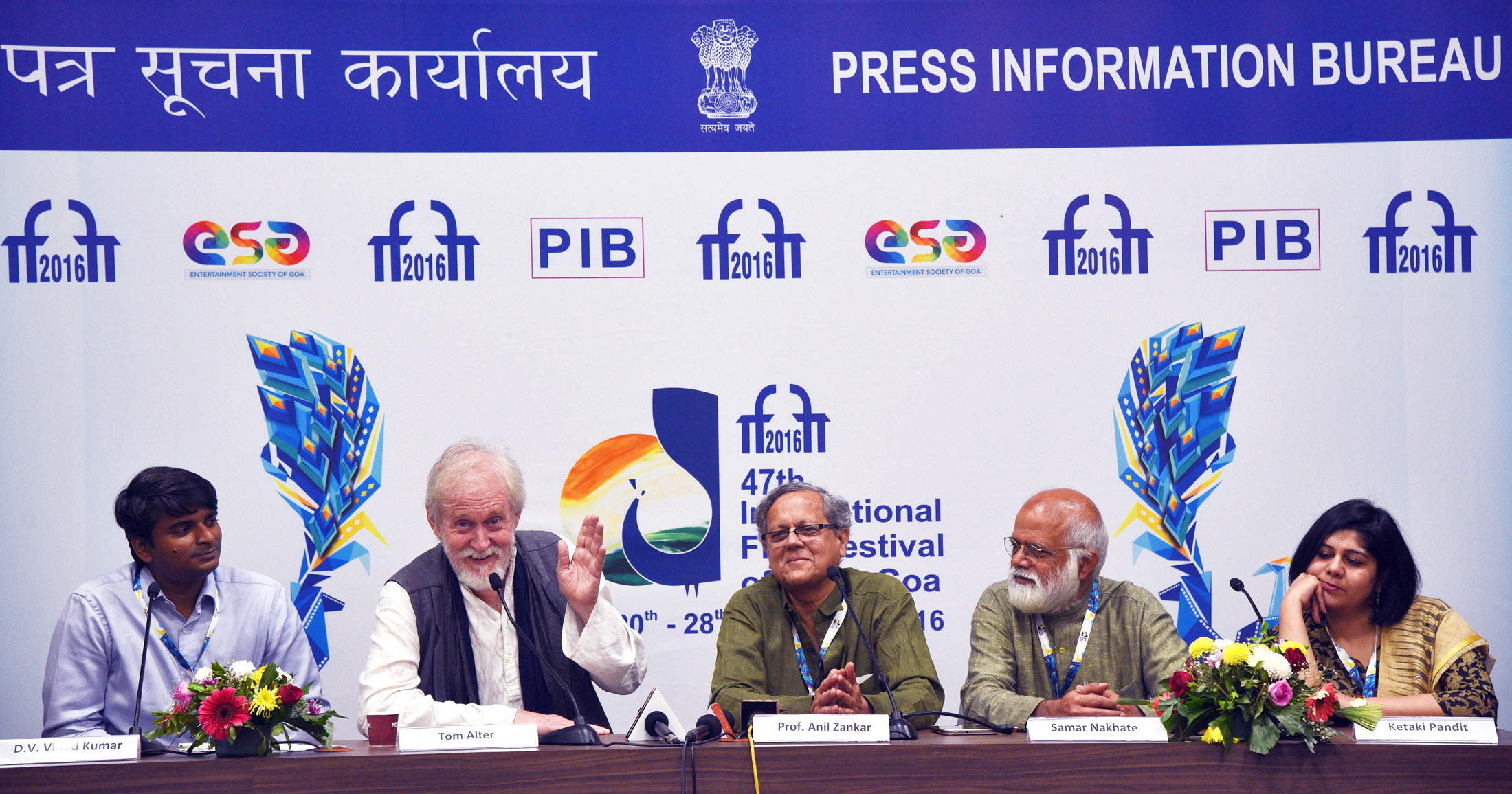
- Tom Alter, Prof. Anil Zankar, Samar Nakhate and Ketaki Pandit at a press conference during the festival
- Awarded for: Best of World cinema
- Presented by: Directorate of Film Festivals
- Presented on: 28 November 2016
- Official website: www.iffigoa.org

Highlights
- Best Feature Film: Daughter
- Lifetime achievement: Im Kwon-taek

The 47th International Film Festival of India was held from 20 to 28 November 2016 in Goa. Filmmaker Nagesh Kukunoor was appointed chairman of the Indian Panorama section, and Sameer Arya as the Member head of the panel.

== Juries ==
=== International competition ===
- Ivan Passer, Czech Republican writer and director, Chairperson
- Larry Smith
- Lordan Zafranovič, Yugoslavian director
- Nagesh Kukunoor, Indian director
- Leïla Kilani, Moroccan director, screenwriter, and producer

=== Indian Panorama ===
==== Feature films ====
- Rama Vij, Actress
- Arup Manna, Director
- C V Reddy, Producer and Director
- Girish Mohite, Producer and Director
- K. Puttaswamy, Writer
- N . Krishnakumar, Producer and Director
- Sabyasachi Mohapatra, Filmmaker
- Sanjay Pawar, Director and Columnist
- Satinder Mohan, Critic and Journalist
- Swapan Mullick, Journalist and Film Critic
- Uday Shankar Pani, Writer and Filmmaker
- Shri raj, Producer and Director

==== Non-feature films ====
- Aarti Srivastava, Documentary Filmmaker
- Abhijit Mazumdar, Documentary Filmmaker
- Gautam Benegal, Animation Filmmaker
- Madhureeta Anand, Film writer and Director
- Ronel Haobam, Documentary Filmmaker
- Prof. Suresh Sharma, Film Critic and Documentary Filmmaker

== Winners ==
- Golden Peacock (Best Film): "Daughter" by Reza Mirkarimi
- IFFI Best Director Award: Soner Kanar and Baris Kaya for "Rauf"
- IFFI Best Debut Director Award: Papa San Martin for "Rara"
- IFFI Best Actor Award (Male): Silver Peacock Award: Farhad Aslani for "Daughter"
- IFFI Best Actor Award (Female): Silver Peacock Award: Elina Vaska for "Mellow Mud"
- Silver Peacock Special Jury Award: "The Throne" by Lee Joon-ik
- Special Mention: Tiffany Hsiung for "The Apology".

== Special awards ==
- IFFI ICFT UNESCO Gandhi Medal: Mustafa Kara for "Cold of Kalandar"
- Life Time Achievement Award - Im Kwon-taek
- IFFI Indian Film Personality of the year Award: S. P. Balasubrahmanyam

== Official selections ==
=== Opening film ===
"Afterimage" by Andrzej Wajda

=== Closing film ===
- "The Age of Shadows" by "Kim Jee-woon"
