= 38th International Film Festival of India =

Indian film festival in 2007

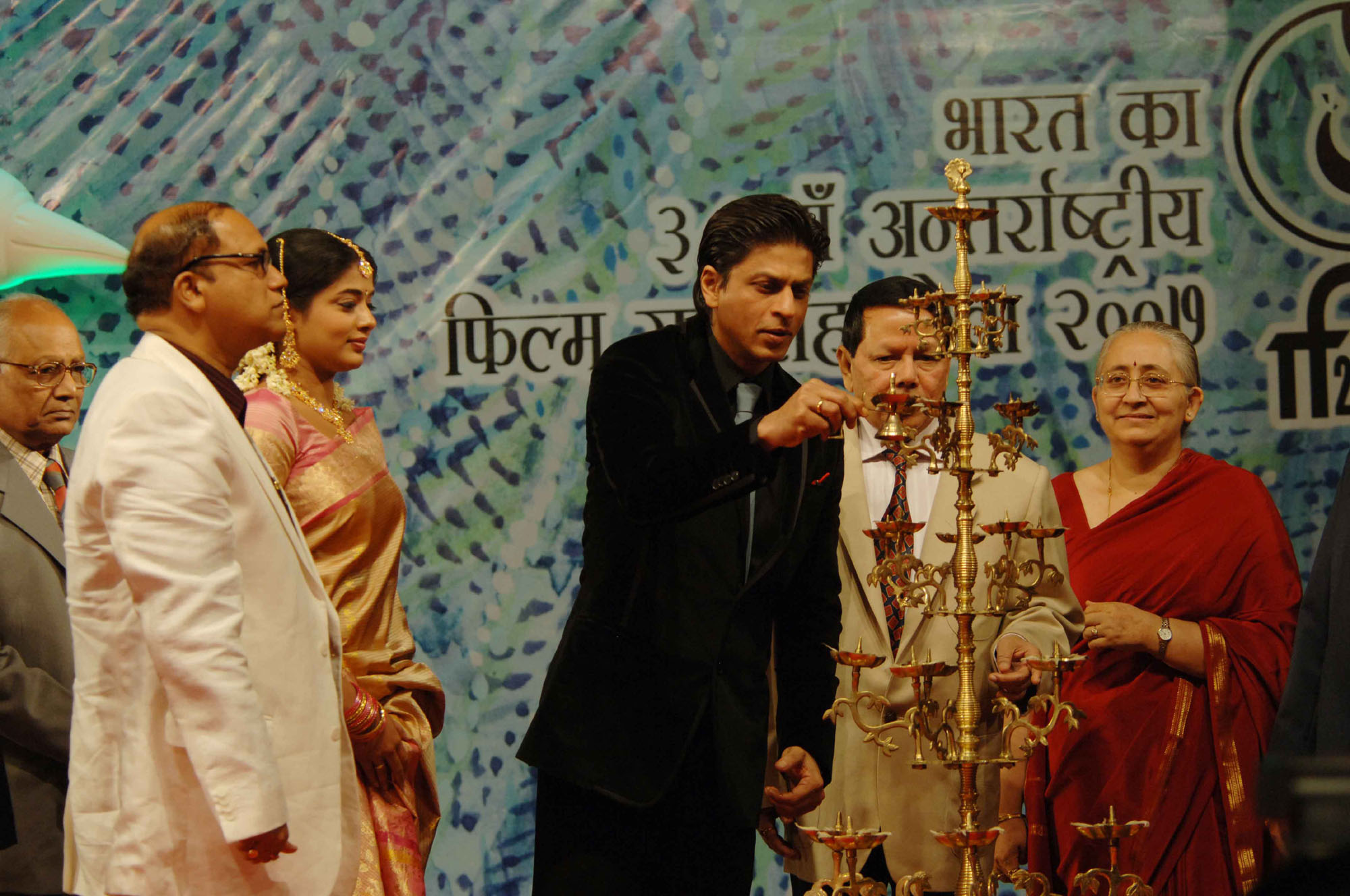
- The chief guest and renowned actor Shahrukh Khan lighting the lamp at the inauguration of the 38th IFFI at Panaji, Goa on November 23, 2007.
- Awarded for: Best of World cinema
- Presented by: Directorate of Film Festivals
- Presented on: December 3 2007
- Official website: www.iffigoa.org

Highlights
- Best Feature Film: "The Wall"
- Lifetime achievement: "Dilip Kumar" and "Lata Mangeshkar"

The 38th International Film Festival of India was held from November 23 to December 3 2007 in Goa. Hungarian cinema was the "Country Focus" in this edition. Filmmaker Buddhadeb Dasgupta was the chief guest for this edition.

== Winners ==
- Golden Peacock (Best Film): "The Wall" by "Lin Chih Ju" (Taiwanese film)
- Life Time Achievement Award - "Dilip Kumar" and "Lata Mangeshkar"
- Silver Peacock Special Jury Award: Director: to "Golam Rabanny Biplab" for "On The Wings of Dreams" (Bangladeshi film)
- Silver Peacock Special Jury Award: Actress: to Julia Urbini for "More Than Anything In The World" (Mexican film)
- Silver Peacock Award for the Most Promising Asian Director:"Pongpat Wachirabunjong" for "Me... Myself" (Thai film).

== Official selections ==
=== Opening film ===
- "4 months, 3 weeks and 2 days" by "Cristian Mungiun" (Romanian film).

=== Closing film ===
- "Fados" by "Carlos Saura" (Portugal-Spain film).
