= 26th International Film Festival of India =

Indian film festival in 1995

- Awarded for: Best of World cinema
- Presented by: Directorate of Film Festivals
- Official website: www.iffigoa.org

The 26th International Film Festival of India was held from 10 to 20 January 1995 at Mumbai, India.

Based on an August 1988 decision by the Ministry of Information and Broadcasting, the festival was made interim non-competitive from the 13th through 26th editions (from 1990 to 1995).

== Non-Competitive Sections ==
- Cinema of the World
- Indian Panorama - Feature Films
- Indian Panorama - Non-Feature Films
- Indian Panorama - Mainstream Films
