= 33rd International Film Festival of India =

Indian film festival in 2002

- Awarded for: Best of World cinema
- Presented by: Directorate of Film Festivals
- Presented on: 10 October 2002
- Official website: www.iffigoa.org
- Best Feature Film: "Letters to Elza"

The 33rd International Film Festival of India was held from 1 to 10 October 2002 in New Delhi. The competitive edition was restricted to films by "Asian directors". Deepak Sandhu served as the director for the festival. The Devdas retrospective received special mention. From this edition, the "Film Bazaar" was instituted.

== Winners ==
- Golden Peacock (Best Film): "Letters to Elza" by Igor Maslennikov (Russian film)
- Silver Peacock Award for the Most Promising Asian Director: Reza Mirkarimi for "zir e noor e maah" ("Under the Moonlight") (Iranian film)
- Silver Peacock Special Jury Award: "Mitr, My Friend" by Revathi (India) and "Asrar EL-Banat" by Magdy Ahmed Aly (Egyptian film)

== Devdas Retrospective ==
- Devdas (1935 Bengali) by Pramathesh Barua
- Devadasu (1953 Telugu) by Vedantam Raghavayya
- Devdas (1955 Hindi) by Bimal Roy
- Devdas (2002 Hindi) by Sanjay Leela Bhansali
