= 41st International Film Festival of India =

Indian film festival in 2010

- Awarded for: Best of World cinema
- Presented by: Directorate of Film Festivals
- Presented on: 2 December 2010
- Official website: www.iffigoa.org
- Best Feature Film: "Moner Manush"

The Chief Minister of Goa, Shri Digambar Kamat, the Chairman, UB Group, Shri Vijay Mallya, the Director General (M&C) & Director, DFF, Shri S.M. Khan, the CEO, Entertainment Society of Goa, Shri Manoj Srivastava and the jury members with the awardees at the Short Film Centre Awards 2010 presentation ceremony, during the 41st International Film Festival of India (IFFI-2010), in Panjim, Goa on November 30, 2010

The 41st International Film Festival of India was held from 22 November to 2 December 2010 in Goa. Veteran director Yash Chopra was the chief guest for this edition. The "Cannes Kaleidoscope 2010" was the highlight of the 41st edition. The "Best Actress" and "Best Actor" awards were re-instituted from this edition. The 41st edition paid homage to veteran French filmmaker Eric Rohmer by screening six of his feature films. The platinum jubilee of Oriya Cinema was commemorated and 26 feature films were screened. The edition also marked the commemoration of the Golden Jubilee of the Film & Television Institute of India.

== Winners ==
- Golden Peacock (Best Film): "Moner Manush" by "Gautam Ghose" (Bengali film)
- IFFI Best Actor Award (Female): Silver Peacock Award: "Magdalena Boczarska" for "Little Rose"
- IFFI Best Actor Award (Male): Silver Peacock Award: "Güven Kıraç" for "The Crossing"
- Silver Peacock Special Jury Award: "Kaushik Ganguly" for "Arekti Premer Golpo" (Indian film) and "Taika Waititi" for the "Boy" (Kiwi film)
- IFFI Best Director Award: Silver Peacock Award: "Susanne Bier" for "In a Better World" (Danish film)

== Official selections ==
=== Special screenings ===
- "HE..." by "Mangesh Joshi" (Bhojpuri Film)

=== Opening film ===
- "West is West" by "Andy De Emmony" (British film).

=== Closing film ===
- "The Princess of Montpensier" by "Bertrand Tavernier" (French film).
