= Karunam =

- Directed by: Jayaraj
- Written by: Madambu Kunjukuttan
- Screenplay by: Madambu Kunjukuttan
- Produced by: Jayaraj
- Starring: Biju Menon; Eliyamma; Madambu Kunjukuttan; Vavachan
- Cinematography: M. J. Radhakrishnan
- Edited by: A. Sreekar Prasad
- Music by: Sunny Stephen
- Production company: Harvest International
- Distributed by: Harvest International
- Release date: 7 April 2000
- Country: India
- Language: Malayalam

Karunam is a 2000 Indian Malayalam film, directed and produced by Jayaraj. The film stars Biju Menon, Eliyamma, Madambu Kunjukuttan and Vavachan in lead roles, with music composed by Sunny Stephen. The film is the second installment in Jayaraj's "Navarasa Series".

== Cast ==
- Biju Menon
- Lena
- Eliyamma
- Madambu Kunjukuttan
- Vavachan

== Soundtrack ==
The music was composed by Sunny Stephen and the lyrics were written by Mariamma John and C. J. Kuttappan.

No.	Song	Singers	Lyrics	Length (m:ss)
1	"Aaraariro"	Mariamma John	Mariamma John	
2	"Achan Kuzhithondi"	C. J. Kuttappan	C. J. Kuttappan	
3	"Anthakathe Vayalile"	Chorus, C. J. Kuttappan	C. J. Kuttappan	
4	"Kannodum Kaalayodum"	Mariamma John	Mariamma John	
5	"Maanam Neranja"	C. J. Kuttappan	C. J. Kuttappan	
6	"Mannu Thediya"	C. J. Kuttappan	C. J. Kuttappan	
7	"Potamalayammakku"	C. J. Kuttappan	C. J. Kuttappan	

== Awards ==
- Golden Peacock (Best Film) at the 31st International Film Festival of India.
- Filmfare Award for Best Film - Malayalam received by Jayaraj (2000)
- John Abraham Award for Best Malayalam Film (1999)
