= At Five in the Afternoon =

- British DVD cover
- Directed by: Samira Makhmalbaf
- Written by: Mohsen Makhmalbaf; Samira Makhmalbaf
- Produced by: Siamak Alagheband; Mohsen Makhmalbaf
- Starring: Agheleh Rezaie; Abdolgani Yousefrazi; Razi Mohebi; Marzieh Amiri
- Cinematography: Ebrahim Ghafori; Samira Makhmalbaf
- Edited by: Mohsen Makhmalbaf
- Music by: Mohammad Reza Darvishi
- Production companies: BAC Films; Wild Bunch
- Release dates: 16 May 2003 (Cannes); 16 April 2004 (UK)
- Running time: 105 minutes
- Countries: Iran; France
- Language: Dari Persian

At Five in the Afternoon (Persian: پنج عصر, romanized: Panj é asr) is a 2003 film by Iranian writer-director Samira Makhmalbaf. It tells the story of an ambitious young woman trying to gain an education in Afghanistan after the 2001 ouster of the Taliban rule. The title comes from a Federico García Lorca poem and is a tale of flourishing against the odds. It was the first film from Afghanistan following the fall of the Taliban.

The film premiered In Competition at the 2003 Cannes Film Festival and was awarded the Jury Prize and the Prize of the Ecumenical Jury. It won Golden Peacock (Best Film) at the 34th International Film Festival of India.

== Plot ==
Nogreh is a young woman living in a war-torn Kabul with her father, sister-in-law and her sister-in-law's baby, covertly attending an all girls school against her conservative father's wishes. Nogreh is one of the few girls at the school who dreams of one day becoming president. While searching for water one day after school she comes across several truckloads of refugees returning from Pakistan and helps them resettle in the ruins she calls home. However, the number of refugees overwhelms the shelter where her family have been living and they are eventually forced out by several other families. They manage to find shelter in an abandoned airplane but this, too, is eventually overcrowded by the returning refugees.

Nogreh meets a refugee among the ruins who is a poet. She asks him if he knows whether the president of Pakistan is a man or a woman and he, like everyone else, does not know. However, after befriending Nogreh and learning of her ambitions to be president, he helps procure political speeches and goes with her to a photographer to get photos of her that she can use to campaign.

Nogreh's father learns from one of the refugees that his son has died. Unwilling to tell his daughter-in-law, he moves the family further into the desert where his grandson dies of starvation and malnourishment.

In the desert they meet an old man who is waiting by his donkey, who is dying of hunger and thirst. The man had been trying to get to the city to speak on behalf of Osama Bin Laden to try to prevent him from being given to the Americans. Nogreh's father informs him he is too late and that the Americans have already invaded Afghanistan. After Nogreh's father buries his grandson the family continues on deeper into the desert.

== Development ==
At Five in the Afternoon was the first film to be shot in Kabul after the NATO invasion. It was an international co-production between the Iranian company Makhmalbaf Productions and the French companies BAC Films and Wild Bunch.

Makhmalbaf had difficulty finding an actress willing to play the lead character. Her original choice for the role would not allow her face to appear on camera.

Samira's 14-year-old sister Hana Makhmalbaf made a documentary about the making of the film, entitled Joy of Madness (Lezate divanegi). It documents Samira's trials and tribulations whilst trying to persuade people in Kabul to take part in her film. As a teenager, Hana was able to amass a lot of digital video footage unnoticed.

== Reception ==
Deborah Young of Variety called the film "[a] poetic journey into the heart of Afghanistan today".
