= Aakrosh (1980 film) =

1980 film by Govind Nihalani

- Directed by: Govind Nihalani
- Written by: Vijay Tendulkar
- Produced by: Devi Dutt; NFDC
- Starring: Naseeruddin Shah; Smita Patil; Amrish Puri; Om Puri
- Cinematography: Govind Nihalani
- Edited by: Keshav Naidu
- Music by: Ajit Varman
- Distributed by: Krsna Movies Enterprise
- Release date: 1980
- Running time: 144 minutes
- Country: India
- Language: Hindi
- Budget: ₹80 lakh
- Box office: ₹1.22 crore

Aakrosh (transl. Outrage) is a 1980 Indian Hindi-language legal drama film directed by Govind Nihalani in his debut, and written by Vijay Tendulkar. Starring Naseeruddin Shah, Om Puri and Amrish Puri in pivotal roles, the film was released to widely positive reviews, winning the Golden Peacock (Best Film) at the 8th International Film Festival of India, as well as the National Film Award for Best Feature Film in Hindi and several other honors.

Nihalani went on to be known for his dark and frighteningly real depictions of human angst in other landmark alternative films such as Ardh Satya and Tamas. Aakrosh is listed among the 60 films that shaped the Indian film industry over a period of six decades.

== Plot ==
The story follows a peasant who faces oppression from landowners and foremen while working as a daily laborer to make ends meet. His wife (Smita Patil), is raped by the foreman, who then frames him for a crime he did not commit. Overwhelmed by shame, his wife commits suicide.

Following his father's death, the police escorts him to the funeral grounds in restraints to perform the last rites. As he stands by the burning funeral pyre, he notices the foreman casting lustful glances at his prepubescent sister. Anticipating her inevitable fate as a perpetual victim, he seizes an axe and beheads his sister to prevent her from suffering as he and his wife did. In the aftermath of this desperate and tragic act, the downtrodden man screams repeatedly into the sky.

== Themes and influences ==
Allegedly based on a true incident reported on page 7 of a local newspaper, the film was a scathing satire on the corruption in the judicial system and the victimization of the underprivileged by the able and the powerful.

Aakrosh forms a part of the series of works, based around explorations in violence, written by noted playwright Vijay Tendulkar, who had earlier written Shyam Benegal's Nishant (1974) and went on to write Govind Nihalani's next surprise breakaway hit, Ardh Satya (1983).

Here the victim is shown so traumatized by excessive oppression and violation of his humanity, that he does not utter a single word almost for the length of the film and only bears a stunned look, though later he uses the same violence as a tool to express his own sense of violation and rage.

At the end of the film we hear the victim's voice for the second time (the first is in a flashback, as he vainly attempts to rescue his wife), which is a device similar to Andrei Tarkovsky's showing of the icons in brilliant color at the end of his three-hour black-and-white film Andrei Rublev.

== Cast ==
- Naseeruddin Shah as Bhaskar Kulkarni, Lawyer
- Om Puri as Lahanya Bhiku
- Smita Patil as Nagi Bhiku
- Amrish Puri as Dusane, Public Prosecutor
- Mohan Agashe as Bhonsle, chairman, Zilla Parishad
- Mahesh Elkunchwar as Social worker
- Nana Palsikar as Bhiku's father
- Achyut Potdar as More, forest contractor
- Deepak Shirke as ruffian
- Bhagyashree Kotnis as Bhiku's sister
- Reema Lagoo as lavni dancer
- Arvind Deshpande as Dr Vasant M. Patil

== Songs ==
1. "Kanha Re" - Vandana Khandekar - 7.33, Music : Ajit Varman, Lyrics : Vasant Deo
2. "Sanson Mein Dard" - Madhuri Purandare - 5.44, Music: Ajit Varman, Lyrics: Suryabhanu Gupta
3. "Tu Aisa Kaisa Mard" - Madhuri Purandare - 3.10, Music: Ajit Varman, Lyrics: Vasant Deo

== Accolades ==
Year	Award	Category	Nominee(s)	Result
1980	National Film Awards	Best Feature Film in Hindi	Devi Dutt and Govind Nihalani	Won
1981	8th IFFI	IFFI Best Film Award	Devi Dutt and Govind Nihalani	Won
1981	Filmfare Awards	Best Film	Devi Dutt	Nominated
1981	Filmfare Awards	Best Director	Govind Nihalani	Won
1981	Filmfare Awards	Best Actor	Naseeruddin Shah	Won
1981	Filmfare Awards	Best Supporting Actor	Om Puri	Won
1981	Filmfare Awards	Best Story	Vijay Tendulkar	Won
1981	Filmfare Awards	Best Screenplay	Vijay Tendulkar	Won
1981	Filmfare Awards	Best Art Direction	C.S. Bhatti	Won
