= 25th International Film Festival of India =

Indian film festival in 1994

- Awarded for: Best of World cinema
- Presented by: Directorate of Film Festivals
- Official website: www.iffigoa.org

The 25th International Film Festival of India was held during 10-20 January 1994 at Kolkata.

Based on a decision made in August 1988 by the Ministry of Information and Broadcasting, the festival was made interim non-competitive from the 13th through 26th editions (from 1990 to 1995).

== Non-Competitive Sections ==
- Cinema of The World
- Indian Panorama - Feature Films
- Indian Panorama - Non-Feature Films
- Indian Panorama - Mainstream Films
