= Mitr, My Friend =

- Directed by: Revathi
- Screenplay by: V. Priya; Sudha Kongara
- Story by: V. Priya
- Produced by: Suresh Chandra Menon
- Starring: Shobhana; Naseer Abdullah; Preeti Vissa
- Cinematography: Fowzia Fathima
- Edited by: Beena Paul
- Music by: Bhavatharini Ilayaraaja; Vikesh Mehta
- Production company: Telephoto Entertainments Limited
- Distributed by: Tele Photo Films
- Release date: 21 February 2002
- Running time: 105 minutes
- Country: India
- Language: English

Mitr, My Friend is a 2002 Indian English-language drama film directed by Revathi in her directorial debut, and written by V. Priya and Sudha Kongara. The film stars Shobana, Naseer Abdullah and Preeti Vissa. Set partly in India and the US the film was also noted for having an all-woman crew. The movie won the Best English Film of the Year award at the 49th National Film Awards. The movie also won Best Actress and Best Editor awards for Shobhana and Beena Paul, respectively, at the same function. Revathi received the "Special Jury Award: Silver Peacock" at the 33rd International Film Festival of India. The film also contains Tamil dialogues, while most of the songs are in Hindi.

== Plot ==
The film opens with a typical South Indian wedding being performed between Lakshmi (Shobhana) and Prithvi (Naseer Abdullah). The marriage has been arranged by their parents. Lakshmi is a typical South Indian girl from Chidambaram, Tamil Nadu; Prithvi is a software engineer working in California. After the wedding, they move to the US where Lakshmi gradually tries to fit into her new surroundings. The marriage is a happy union: Prithvi works hard at work, Lakshmi manages the home, and they grow to love one other deeply. Within a year, they are blessed with a baby girl Divya (Preeti Vissa).

The film flashes forward 17 years. Divya is a typical adolescent: she goes to school, plays soccer, and occasionally attends parties. Lakshmi does not take to the partying very well, and tensions rise between mother and daughter. Divya aspires independence, and Lakshmi wants her to be responsible. Prithvi understands both sides, and tries to cope with Divya's growing up, but not always with full cognizance of Lakshmi's feelings.

Things escalate one evening when Lakshmi sees Divya kissing her boyfriend Robbie outside her home. Lakshmi is furious that Divya has gone against her traditional values. In her fury, she bursts forward and drives Robbie away from the porch. Divya is furious and moves out of her parents' house and begins to live with Robbie. Lakshmi is overwhelmed by this, and Prithvi is also angered, because he feels that Lakshmi mishandled the situation. He begins to drift away from Lakshmi.

Amid this storm, Lakshmi seeks a shoulder in an internet chat room, where she meets a "mitr" (Sanskrit: friend), with whom she is gradually able to share her thoughts and feelings. This connection yields another result: "mitr" points out that Lakshmi is too committed to her family to relax or be happy for herself. Lakshmi digests this and begins to explore her own interests in carpentry, dance, and hairstyling; she thereby establishes a new identity and personality for herself. She becomes fast friends with her new neighbors, Steve (a computer security consultant) and his kid brother Paul.

Prithvi keeps his distance from these neighbors and all of Lakshmi's new friends. He is chagrined that the new Lakshmi is no longer his doting and traditional wife. While he is inwardly glad she is growing, he discovers that there is depleting room for him, particularly at a time when he is coping with his daughter's absence. He overhears Lakshmi laughing with Steve, assumes the worst, and uses a convenient work-related excuse to move out for a few days.

The film takes a turn when Lakshmi, now alone at home, receives a call from the hospital. Divya has broken up with Robbie and hurt. Divya realizes that she cannot cope with the vagaries and lack of commitment inherent in relationships with non-Indian people; she regrets her previous decisions and decides to return home. Mother and daughter spend some quality time and bond over Lakshmi's narration of nostalgic stories about her arrival to a new life in the USA. She is in touch with her "mitr" all through.

The film builds to its climax when she asks, at Divya's urging, "mitr" to meet in person at the Fisherman's Wharf in San Francisco. All is revealed when "mitr" turns out to be none other than Prithvi himself.

== Cast ==
- Shobhana as Lakshmi
- Naseer Abdullah as Prithvi
- Preeti Vissa as Divya
- Matt Phillips as Steve
- Blake Ormsby as Paul
- Brian G. Linebaugh as Brian
- Shirley Bennet as Pam

== Music ==
The music was composed by Bhavatharini Ilayaraaja, Vikesh Mehta (3 songs each) and Karthik Raja (1 song). It consists of five Hindi songs, one English song and one Tamil song. (Note: While only Bhavatharini is credited in the opening credits, Vikesh Mehta is additionally credited in the end credits.)

Track listing
No.	Title	Lyrics	Music	Singer(s)	Length
1.	"Kuzhaloodhi"	Subba Iyer	Bhavatharini Ilayaraaja, Subba Iyer (unc.)	Bombay Jayashri
2.	"Thomtana"	P. K. Mishra	Bhavatharini Ilayaraaja	Vasundhara Das
3.	"Ehsaas"	Gulzar	Bhavatharini Ilayaraaja	Hariharan
4.	"Give Me Hugs"	Satish Chakravarthy	Karthik Raja	Sunitha Sarathy
5.	"Jaane Wafaa"	P. K. Mishra	Vikesh Mehta	Sukhwinder Singh
6.	"Mere Sapne"	P. K. Mishra	Vikesh Mehta	Kavita Krishnamurthy
7.	"Pyaar Chahiye"	P. K. Mishra	Vikesh Mehta	Shaan

== Reception ==
A critic from Rediff.com wrote that "Mitr - My Friend is worth a watch. Only, be prepared for a snooze in the first half". A critic from The Hindu wrote that "It's a film that you cannot really find fault with". A critic from Outlook wrote that "The problem, however, rests in the overall feel—there is too much of an even mood throughout the movie. You almost get the sense of watching a TV show".

== Awards ==
49th National Film Awards – 2001

- Best Feature Film in English – Suresh Menon and Revathy
- Best Actress – Shobhana
- Best Editing – Beena Paul

International Film Festival of India

- "Special Jury Award: Silver Peacock" at the 33rd International Film Festival of India – Suresh Menon and Revathy
