= Kumiko Akiyoshi =

Japanese actress

Kumiko Akiyoshi 秋吉 久美子
- Born: Kumiko Onodera; July 29, 1954 (age 72); Fujinomiya, Japan
- Occupation: Actress
- Years active: 1972—present
- Spouse: Shigeru Iwaku (1979—1989)
- Website: http://www.akiyoshikumiko.jp/

Kumiko Onodera (小野寺 久美子, Onodera Kumiko) (born July 29, 1954), better known as Kumiko Akiyoshi (秋吉 久美子, Akiyoshi Kumiko), is a Japanese actress. She won the award for best actress at the 1st Hochi Film Award for Banka, Saraba natsuno hikariyo and Brother and Sister.

== Filmography ==
=== Films ===
- Tabi no omosa (1972) - Kayo
- Juroku-sai no senso (War of the 16 Year Olds) (1973) - Azusa/Mizue (Plays two parts)
- Aka chōchin (1974) - Yukie Shimokawa
- Imouto (1974) - Neri Kojima
- Aoba shigereru (1974) - Hiroko Wakayama
- Virgin Blues (1974) - Shoplifter
- Honō no shōzō (1974)
- Shōwa karesusuki (1975) - Noriko, the sister
- Banka (1976) - Reiko Ando
- Saraba natsuno hikariyo (Farewell, O Summer's Light) (1976) - Kyoko Toda
- Fumō chitai (1976)
- Permanent Blue: Manatsu no koi (1976) - Woman
- Brother and Sister (1976) - Mon
- Totsuzen arashi no youni (1977) - Yuki Kobayashi
- Mount Hakkoda (1977) - Sawa Takiguchi (Guide)
- Sugata Sanshiro (1977) - Otomi Murai
- Wani to oum to ottosei (1977) - Nanako
- Toward the Terra (1980) - Physis
- Something Like It (1981) - Elizabeth
- Bōkensha kamikaze (The Kamikaze Adventurers) (1981) - Kei Kaneshiro
- Farewell to the Land (1982) - Junko
- The Shootout (1982) - Tomoko Araki
- To Trap a Kidnapper (1982) - Hisako Mitamura, the victim's Mother
- Weekend Shuffle (1982) - Yoko Madaraneko
- Seiha (Conquest) (1982) - Fuyuko Tadokoro
- Aitsu to lullaby (1983) - English Teacher
- Chihei-sen (The Horizon) (1984) - Sakura, the first daughter
- Hitohira no yuki (Flakes of Snow) (1985) - Kasumi
- Yogisha (1987) - Satoko Okazaki
- Otoko wa Tsurai yo: Tora-san Plays Daddy (1987) - Takako Takai
- The Discarnates (1988) - Fusako Harada, Mother
- Yuwakusha (The Enchantment) (1989) - Miyako Shinohara
- Gurenbana (1993) - Sakura Okii
- Ressun (Lesson) (1994) - Kaya Saeki
- Deep River (1995) - Mitsuko
- Shibito no koiwazurai (Lovesick Dead) (2001) - Kazuko
- Tsuki no sabaku (Desert Moon) (2001) - Keechie's client
- The Blue Light (2003) - Yuuko Kushimori
- Toukou no ki (Translucent Tree) (2004) - Chigiri Yamazaki
- Family (2023)

=== Television ===
- Dokuganryu Masamune (1987), Neko Gozen
- Tabaruzaka (1987), Saigō Ito
- Koiwa itsumo almond pink (1988)
- Yodogawa Nagaharu monogatari - Kobe-hen: Sainara (1999), Ryu, Nagaharu's mother
- Train Man (2005), Yuki Aoyama, Saori's mother
- Yae's Sakura (2013)

=== Japanese dub ===
- Feud (2017) - Bette Davis (Susan Sarandon)
