= Tora-san Plays Daddy =

- Theatrical poster
- Directed by: Yoji Yamada
- Written by: Yoji Yamada; Yoshitaka Asama
- Produced by: Kiyoshi Shimizu
- Starring: Kiyoshi Atsumi; Kumiko Akiyoshi
- Cinematography: Tetsuo Takaba
- Edited by: Iwao Ishii
- Music by: Naozumi Yamamoto
- Distributed by: Shochiku
- Release date: December 26, 1987
- Running time: 101 minutes
- Country: Japan
- Language: Japanese

Tora-san Plays Daddy (男はつらいよ 寅次郎物語, Otoko wa Tsurai yo: Torajirō Monogatari) aka Torasan's Tale is a 1987 Japanese comedy film directed by Yoji Yamada. It stars Kiyoshi Atsumi as Torajirō Kuruma (Tora-san), and Kumiko Akiyoshi as his love interest or "Madonna". Tora-san Plays Daddy is the 39th entry in the popular, long-running Otoko wa Tsurai yo series.

== Cast ==
- Kiyoshi Atsumi as Torajirō
- Chieko Baisho as Sakura
- Kumiko Akiyoshi as Takako
- Midori Satsuki as Fude
- Shimojo Masami as Kuruma Tatsuzō
- Chieko Misaki as Tsune Kuruma (Torajiro's aunt)
- Gin Maeda as Hiroshi Suwa
- Hidetaka Yoshioka as Mitsuo Suwa
- Hisao Dazai as Boss (Umetarō Katsura)
- Jun Miho as Akemi
- Gajirō Satō as Genkō
- Chishū Ryū as Gozen-sama
- Yūichirō Itō as Hideyoshi
- Tatsuo Matsumura as Kikuda

== Critical appraisal ==
Kiyoshi Atsumi won the Best Actor title at the Nikkan Sports Film Award ceremony for his role in Tora-san Plays Daddy. Nominations for the film at the Japan Academy Prize were for Best Director and Best Screenplay (Yoji Yamada), Best Supporting Actress (Kumiko Akiyoshi), and Best Sound (Isao Suzuki and Takashi Matsumoto). The German-language site molodezhnaja gives Tora-san Plays Daddy three and a half out of five stars.

== Availability ==
Tora-san Plays Daddy was released theatrically on December 26, 1987. In Japan, the film was released on videotape in 1989 and 1996, and in DVD format in 2002, 2005, and 2008.

== Bibliography ==
=== English ===
- "OTOKO WA TSURAI YO TORAJIRO MONOGATARI (1987)". British Film Institute. Archived from the original on 2012-10-18.
- "OTOKO WA TSURAIYO -TORAJIRO MONOGATARI". Complete Index to World Film.
- Otoko wa tsurai yo: Torajiro monogatari (1987) at IMDb

=== German ===
- "Tora-San Plays Daddy" (in German). www.molodezhnaja.ch.

=== Japanese ===
- 男はつらいよ 寅次郎物語 (1987) (in Japanese). allcinema.net.
- "男はつらいよ 寅次郎物語". Japanese Cinema Database (Agency for Cultural Affairs). Archived from the original on 2012-03-11.
- 男はつらいよ 寅次郎物語 (in Japanese). Japanese Movie Database.
- 男はつらいよ 寅次郎物語 (in Japanese). Kinema Junpo. Archived from the original on 2012-03-24.
