= Naseer Abdullah =

Indian actor

- Occupation: Actor
- Years active: 1992–present

Naseer Abdullah is an Indian model and actor best known for his role as Prithvi in the English-language film Mitr, My Friend (2002).

== Career ==
Naseer Abdullah worked as a location manager for Gandhi (1982). He made his acting debut in the Pearl Padamsee stage play Mischief Mania (1992). He made his film debut with Dil Aashna Hai (1993) and after the film's failure, he shifted to advertisements for Digjam and Indian Airlines. He played the antagonist in the television serial Kya Hadsaa Kya Haqeeqat. He played Shobana's workaholic husband in the film Mitr, My Friend (2002), which follows an Indian-American family and their life and struggles in San Francisco. A critic noted that "Nasir Abdullah makes his presence felt" while another wrote that he "now and then does not seem very convinced with what he is doing". He went on to play supporting roles in many films including Main Hoon Na (2004), Page 3 (2005), Kuchh Meetha Ho Jaye (2005), Om Shanti Om (2007) and Gandhi to Hitler (2011).

== Filmography ==
Year	Film	Role	Notes
1992	Dil Aashna Hai	Akram Allahabadi Baig	
2002	Mitr, My Friend	Prithvi	English film
2002	Kya Hadsaa Kya Haqeeqat	Vikas	Television series
2003	Sssshhh...		
2004	Main Hoon Na	Rajat Saxena	
2005	Page 3	Romesh Thapar	
2005	Kuchh Meetha Ho Jaye	Gul Khan	
2005	The Film	Inspector Javed Khan	
2006	Taxi No. 9211	Advocate Shivraj Behl	
2006	Jigyaasa	Ramesh Shah Tak	
2006	36 China Town	Raj's father	
2007	Traffic Signal	Sanjeev	
2007	Good Boy, Bad Boy	Professor Shah	
2007	Chain Kulii Ki Main Kulii	Varun's father	
2007	Apna Asmaan	Mr. Sharma	
2007	Om Shanti Om	Naseer	
2008	Khushboo	Captain R. Aiyar	
2008	Haal-e-Dil	Rohit's father	
2008	Hulla	Gupta	
2009	Lottery	Rohit's Boss	
2009	Kisaan	Advocate Kapoor	
2009	Sikandar		
2009	Daddy Cool	Maria's father	
2009	Fox	Public Prosecutor	
2009	Jail	High Court Judge	
2009	Do Paise Ki Dhoop, Chaar Aane Ki Baarish	Producer	
2010	Fired	Mr. Kapoor	
2010	Paathshaala	Trustee Dholakia	
2010	Apartment	Inspector Javed Sheikh	
2010	The Film Emotional Atyachar	Kailashnath Jaswal	
2010	Knock Out	Bhalla	
2010	A Flat	Digvijay Singh	
2011	Yeh Saali Zindagi	Singhania	
2011	Dear Friend Hitler	Albert Speer	
2012	Diary of a Butterfly	Gul's father	
2012	Paanch Ghantey Mien Paanch Crore	Inspector Ram Singh	
2012	Jeet Lengey Jahaan	Advocate	
2018	Manto	Officer	
2018-2019	A.I.SHA	Kulkarni	Television series
2019	Khushfehmaiyaan	Peter Braganza	Television series
2019	The Office	Anniruddh CFO	Television series
2021	The Devil Inside		Television series
2022	Bachchhan Paandey	Myra's director	
2022	Murder in Agonda	Ignatius Coutinho	Television series
2025	McGuffin	Professor Simha	
