= The King of Masks =

1996 Chinese historical drama film by Wu Tianming

- American DVD cover
- Directed by: Wu Tianming
- Screenplay by: Wei Minglun
- Story by: Chen Wengui
- Produced by: Titus Ho; Mona Fong
- Starring: Zhu Xu; Zhou Renying; Zhao Zhigang
- Cinematography: Mu Da-Yuan
- Music by: Zhao Jiping
- Distributed by: Hong Kong: Shaw Brothers; United States: The Samuel Goldwyn Company
- Release date: 1996
- Running time: 101 min. (China); 91 min. (USA)
- Country: China
- Language: Mandarin

The King of Masks (simplified Chinese: 变脸; traditional Chinese: 變臉; pinyin: Biàn Liǎn) is a 1996 Chinese film directed by Wu Tianming.

== Synopsis ==
In 1930s China, Wang is The King of Masks, an aged street performer who practices the change-mask opera art of bian lian. He laments that he has no male heirs to carry on his mysterious and complicated art and trade. At an illegal child market, Wang buys what he believes to be an orphan boy to become his adopted grandson and apprentice.

However, Wang soon learns his new disciple is in fact a girl. As tradition dictates that he cannot pass his art onto a girl, he tries to abandon her, but she stubbornly stays with him. He later calls her "doggie" and has her refer to him as "boss". He then begins to train her to be a flexible contortionist street performer. While looking at his masks, she accidentally sets his humble houseboat on fire. Out of guilt, she runs away. She is then captured by two men and held in a room with a boy to be sold later. Doggie helps the boy escape and takes him to Wang to have as a grandson.

Wang is falsely accused of kidnapping the boy, a rich family's child, and is thrown in jail. Doggie goes to one of her friends, a famous performer in the local opera, threatening to kill herself if he or any of his guests, including a local military general, are unable to help Wang. The King of Masks is eventually freed, and he finally accepts the girl as his granddaughter and teaches her his art.

== Reception ==
The film won a number of awards at various film festivals around the world. It was released in the United States on June 13, 1999 on a limited theatrical release and earned about one million US dollars. Roger Ebert, writing for the Chicago Sun-Times, gave the film 3 stars, calling it a film "of simplicity, beauty and surprising emotional power" that "benefits enormously from the beauty of the setting, the costumes and the customs".

=== Awards and nominations ===
- Huabiao Awards, 1995
  - Outstanding Co-Production Film
- Golden Rooster Awards, 1996
  - Best Co-Produced Film
  - Best Director—Wu Tianming
- Frankfurt Children and Young People's Film Festival, 1996
  - Lucas, Children's Section
- Tokyo International Film Festival, 1996
  - Best Actor—Zhu Xu
  - Best Director—Wu Tianming
- 29th International Film Festival of India
  - Golden Peacock (Best Film)
- Canberra International Film Festival, 1997
  - Audience Award
- Carrousel International du Film, 1997
  - Camério for Best Actor—Zhu Xu
  - Camério for Best Actress—Zhou Renying
  - Camério for Best Film
- Istanbul International Film Festival, 1997
  - C.I.C.A.E. Award
  - Golden Tulip
- Singapore International Film Festival, 1997
  - Silver Screen Award for Best Asian Director—Wu Tianming
- Fajr Film Festival, 1998
  - Crystal Simorgh for Best Actor—Zhu Xu
- Würzburg International Filmweekend, 1999
  - Children's Film Award
- Satellite Awards, 2000
  - Best Foreign Language Motion Picture (nominated)
- 16th Ale Kino! Festival, 1998
  - Grand Prix—Golden Poznań Goats for Best Movie
  - Marcinek—Special Mention by Children Jury for Movie
  - Best Foreign Director—Tian-Ming Wu
  - Best Foreign Actor or Actress—Chu Yuk
  - Best Foreign Child Actor or Actress—Chao Yim Yin
  - Best Set Decoration in Foreign Movie—Wu Xujing
