= 24th International Film Festival of India =

Indian film festival in 1993

- Awarded for: Best of World cinema
- Presented by: Directorate of Film Festivals
- Official website: www.iffigoa.org

The 24th International Film Festival of India was held during 10-20 January 1993 at New Delhi.

The festival was made interim non-competitive following a decision taken in August 1988 by the Ministry of Information and Broadcasting. The earlier "Filmotsavs" and IFFI 90-91-92 together constituted previous 23 editions of the festival.

== Non-Competitive Sections ==
- Cinema of The World
- Indian Panorama - Feature Films
- Indian Panorama - Non-Feature Films
- Indian Panorama - Mainstream Films
