= Brother and Sister (1976 film) =

1976 Japanese film by Tadashi Imai

- DVD cover
- Ani Imōto (あにいもうと)
- Directed by: Tadashi Imai
- Screenplay by: Yoko Mizuki
- Based on: Ani Imōto by Saisei Murō
- Produced by: Hideyuki Shiino; Masakatsu Kaneko
- Starring: Kumiko Akiyoshi; Masao Kusakari; Hideji Ōtaki
- Cinematography: Kazutami Hara
- Edited by: Nobuo Ogawa
- Music by: Takeshi Shibuya
- Production company: Toho
- Distributed by: Toho
- Release date: November 23, 1976 (Japan)
- Running time: 88 minutes
- Country: Japan
- Language: Japanese

Brother and Sister (Japanese: あにいもうと, Hepburn: Ani Imōto) is a 1976 Japanese drama film directed by Tadashi Imai. It is the second remake of the award-winning 1935 novel of the same name by Saisei Murō. The original film version, directed by Sotoji Kimura, was released in 1936, and the first remake, directed by Mikio Naruse and starring Masayuki Mori and Machiko Kyo, was released in 1953. It won Golden Peacock (Best Film) at the 5th International Film Festival of India.

== Cast ==
- Kumiko Akiyoshi as Mon
- Masao Kusakari as Inokichi
- Hideji Ōtaki as Akaza
- Kimiko Ikegami as San
- Natsuko Kahara as Riki
- Atomu Shimojō as Kobata
- Keizō Kanie as Kifuji

== Awards and nominations ==
1st Hochi Film Awards

- Won: Best Actress – Kumiko Akiyoshi
- Won: Best Supporting Actor – Hideji Ōtaki

31st Mainichi Film Awards

- Won: Excellence Film (shared with Tora-san's Sunrise and Sunset and The Youth Killer)
