= János Rózsás =

Hungarian writer

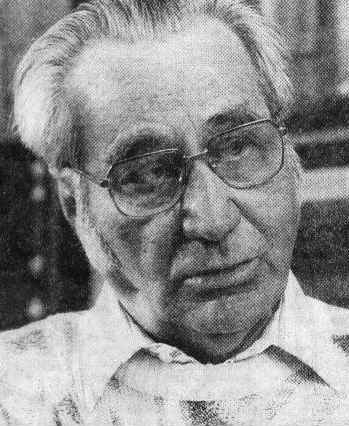
János Rózsás

János Rózsás (6 August 1926 – 2 November 2012) was a Hungarian writer.

Rózsás was born in Budapest. He was held captive in the Soviet Union between 1944 and 1953; it was during this period of internment that Rózsás became friends with Aleksandr Solzhenitsyn, the Nobel prize-winning Soviet writer. He wrote several books and articles on the issue of the Gulag. Zoltan Szalkai, the Hungarian filmmaker, made a film of János Rózsás and György Zoltán Bien, who were eyewitnesses of the gulag. Rózsás died on November 2, 2012, aged 86, in Nagykanizsa.

== Published works ==
- Keserű ifjúság (Bitter Youth) (München, 1986)
- Éltető reménység (Vital Trust) (München, 1987)
- Duszja nővér (Nurse Duszja) (Nagykanizsa, 1995)
- GULAG-lexikon (GULAG-encyclopedia) (Budapest, 2000)
- Leventesors (Fate of a young Hungarian military trainee during the Second World War) (Nagykanizsa, 2005)
