= International Film Festival of India =

Annual film festival

- Location: Panaji, Goa, India
- Founded: 24 January 1952; 74 years ago
- Most recent: 2025
- Awards: Golden Peacock; Best Feature Film; Major Awards; UNESCO Gandhi Medal; Satyajit Ray Lifetime Achievement Award; Indian Film Personality of the year Award
- Hosted by: Government of Goa; Directorate of Film Festivals
- Website: iffigoa.org

Current: 56th
- 57th 55th

The International Film Festival of India (IFFI), founded in 1952, is an annual film festival currently held in Goa, on the western coast of India. The festival aims at providing a common platform for the cinemas of the world to project the excellence of the film art; contributing to the understanding and appreciation of film cultures of different nations in the context of their social and cultural ethos, and promoting friendship and cooperation among people of the world. The festival is conducted jointly by the National Film Development Corporation of India (under the Ministry of Information and Broadcasting) and the state Government of Goa.

== Vision ==
Ayam nijam paroveti gananā laghuchetasām, Udāracharitānām tu vasudhaiva kutumbakam

(Extract from the Vedic scripture Maha Upanishad, meaning "This is for me and that is for other – is the thinking of a narrow-minded person. For those who are broad-minded, liberals, or noble people, the entire world is one big family.")

== History ==
=== First IFFI ===
The 1st edition of IFFI was organized by the Films Division, Government of India, with the patronage of the first Prime Minister of India. Held in Mumbai from 24 January to 1 February 1952, the Festival was subsequently taken to Madras, Delhi, Calcutta and Trivandrum. In all it had about 40 features and 100 short films. In Delhi, the IFFI was inaugurated by Prime Minister Pt Jawaharlal Nehru on 21 February 1952.

The first edition was non-competitive, and had 23 countries including the United States participating with 40 feature films and about a hundred short films. The Indian entries for the festival were Awara (Hindi), Pathala Bhairavi (Telugu), Amar Bhoopali (Marathi) and Babla (Bengali). This was the first International Film Festival held anywhere in Asia. The notable world panorama during the festival were Bicycle Thieves, Miracle in Milan, and Rome, Open City from Italy. Yukiwarisoo (Japan), The Dancing Fleese (UK), The River (US) and The Fall of Berlin (USSR).

=== Third IFFI ===
It was for the first time that the Indian Film Industry was exposed to a vast range of outstanding post-war era films. From the 3rd edition in January 1965, IFFI became competitive. It has since then moved to Trivandrum, the capital of Kerala. In 1975 the Filmotsav, non-competitive and to be held in other film-making cities in alternate years, was introduced. Later, Filmotsavs were merged into IFFI. In 2004 the IFFI was moved to Goa from Trivandrum. Since then IFFI has been an annual event and competitive. The venue for the second festival held in 1961 which was also non-competitive was New Delhi. The third edition of the festival was chaired by Satyajit Ray. For the first time the festival became competitive, and was graded 'A' category by the Paris – based Federation International de Producers de Films. With this recognition the festival in India came on par with Cannes, Berlin, Venice, Karlovy Vary, and Moscow International film festivals.

Following this recognition, India adopted, at its fifth festival in 1975, a permanent insignia. This comprises a representation of the peacock, India's national bird, with a permanent motto of the festival 'Vasudhaiva Kutumbakam' (The whole world is a family). The same year it was decided to hold a non-competitive festival of festival films (Filmotsav) alternating with IFFI. While the Filmotsavs were organized at major film – producing centres of India, IFFI was held in New Delhi only.

The venue being the same for all festivals, the fourth and fifth festivals were held from 5–18 December 1969 and 30 December 1974-12 January 1975 respectively. From the sixth festival onwards the period, as well as the dates for the festival, were fixed as 3–17 January every alternate year. The sixth festival was held in 1977 and silver peacock for best actor, actress, and director was awarded for the first time. A film market was also set up for the first time by the IMPEC. The Indian Panorama section was instituted from this edition.

Following a decision taken in August 1988 by the Ministry of Information and Broadcasting that 3 more editions of festivals in future will be interim non-competitive, and all festivals would be called International Film Festival of India (IFFI). The "Filmotsavs" and IFFI 90-91-92 together constituted 23 editions of the festival

== Chronology of IFFI and Filmotsav ==
Edition	Year	Venue	Competitive
1st	24 January 1952	Mumbai	No
2nd	27 October – 2 November 1961	New Delhi	No
3rd	8–21 January 1965	New Delhi	Yes
4th	5 – 18 December 1969	New Delhi	Yes
5th	30 December 1974 – 12 January 1975	New Delhi	Yes
Filmotsav	14 November 1975	Kolkata	No
Filmotsav	2 – 15 January 1976	Mumbai	No
6th	3–16 January 1977	New Delhi	Yes
Filmotsav	3 -16 January 1978	Chennai	No
7th	3–16 January 1979	New Delhi	Yes
Filmotsav	3 -16 January 1980	Bengaluru	No
8th	3–16 January 1981	New Delhi	Yes
Filmotsav	3 -16 January 1982	Kolkata	No
9th	3–16 January 1983	New Delhi	Yes
Filmotsav	3 -16 January 1984	Mumbai	No
10th	3–16 January 1985	New Delhi	Yes
Filmotsav	10–24 January 1986	Hyderabad	No
11th	10–24 January 1987	New Delhi	Yes
Filmotsav	10–24 January 1988	Thiruvananthapuram	No
12th	10–24 January 1989	New Delhi	No
IFFI' 90	10–20 January 1990	Kolkata	No
IFFI' 91	10–20 January 1991	Chennai	No
IFFI' 92	10–20 January 1992	Bengaluru	No
24th	10–20 January 1993	New Delhi	No
25th	10–20 January 1994	Kolkata	No
26th	10–20 January 1995	Mumbai	No
27th	10–20 January 1996	New Delhi	Yes – Asian Women Directors
28th	10–20 January 1997	Thiruvananthapuram	No
29th	10–20 January 1998	New Delhi	Yes – Asian Directors
30th	10–20 January 1999	Hyderabad	No
31st	10–20 January 2000	New Delhi	Yes – Asian Directors
32nd	2001 – Cancelled	Cancelled	No
33rd	1–10 October 2002	New Delhi	Yes – Asian Competition
34th	9 – 19 October 2003	New Delhi	Yes – Asian Competition
35th	29 November - 9 December 2004	Goa	Yes
36th	24 November - 4 December 2005	Goa	Yes
37th	23 November - 3 December 2006	Goa	Yes
38th	23 November - 3 December 2007	Goa	Yes
39th	22 November - 1 December 2008	Goa	Yes
40th	23 November - 3 December 2009	Goa	Yes
41st	22 November - 2 December 2010	Goa	Yes
42nd	23 - 30 November 2011	Goa	Yes
43rd	20 - 30 November 2012	Goa	Yes
44th	20 - 30 November 2013	Goa	Yes
45th	20 - 30 November 2014	Goa	Yes
46th	20 - 30 November 2015	Goa	Yes
47th	20 - 28 November 2016	Goa	Yes
48th	20 - 28 November 2017	Goa	Yes
49th	20 - 28 November 2018	Goa	Yes
50th	20 - 28 November 2019	Goa	Yes
51st	16 - 24 January 2021	Goa	Yes
52nd	20 - 28 November 2021	Goa	Yes
53rd	20 - 28 November 2022	Goa	Yes
54th	20 - 28 November 2023	Goa	Yes
55th	20 - 28 November 2024	Goa	Yes
56th	20 - 28 November 2025	Goa	Yes

== Permanent venue ==
Since 2004, starting from the 35th edition, the International Film Festival of India, became globally competitive, and moved to its permanent venue Goa, and is being held during the months of November and December of each year. The dates for the festival vary each year and there are no fixed dates.

== IFFI Awards ==
=== Main Prize - Golden Peacock Award ===
- Best Feature Film
- Best Short Film (Discontinued)

=== Silver Peacock Award ===
- Best Feature Film (Discontinued)
- Best Director
- Best Actor
- Best Actress
- Best Debut Film of a Director
- Best Indian Debut Director Award
- Special Jury Award and Special Mention

=== Special Award ===
- ICFT UNESCO Gandhi Medal
- Satyajit Ray Lifetime Achievement Award
- Indian Film Personality of the Year Award

=== OTT Award ===
- IFFI Best Web Series (OTT) Award

== Miscellany ==
- The first IFFI was held in 1952, and American director Frank Capra attended as a part of the US delegation.
- On the eve of IFFI 2006, journalist and author Mario Cabral e Sa's book Location Goa, highlighting Goa's contribution to the Hindi film world, was released on 21 November 2006.
- Since 2004, Goa has hosted IFFI every year. This brings in more visitors to the State, and also coincides with the novenas and feast of the 16th-century Basque missionary-saint Francis Xavier.
- In 2017 edition, IFFI recognized the innovative works of 15 people and companies that had made significant contribution in developing technologies related to media. A special exhibition was held to showcase their work throughout the course of the festival. The recognized personalities included Mithaq Kazimi, Greg Acuna among others.
- In January 2021, due to COVID-19 pandemic, the 51st edition of IFFI for year 2020 was held as hybrid event, there was physical and virtual screening of 50 films out of 224 films across various categories. In addition many online events were organised. Two Goan films were selected for screening in premium and non-premium sections.
- The 52nd IFFI opened on 20 November and closed on 28 November 2021 in Goa. Like the 51st edition, this edition was also held in a hybrid format, which combines online and face-to-face participation. In the 2021 festival, on the occasion of the birth centenary of Satyajit Ray, the Directorate of Film Festivals paid tribute to him through a 'Special Retrospective' of 11 specially curated films. Lifetime achievement award, in recognition of the auteur's legacy, was named the 'Satyajit Ray Lifetime Achievement Award' this year.
- The 54th IFFI opened on 20 November and closed on 28 November 2023 in Goa. 270 films were showcased during the festival. Best Web Series (OTT) Award was introduced in this edition of the festival.
- The 55th IFFI took place from 20 to 28 November 2024 at Panaji, Goa. The theme of the festival was 'Young Filmmakers – The Future is Now', so a new section and award category 'Best Debut Director of Indian Feature Film' was introduced in the festival to encourage young blood. The festival screened over 180 international films from 81 countries, including 15 world premieres.

== See also ==
- List of Indian winners and nominees at the Cannes Film Festival
- List of Indian winners and nominees of the Academy Awards
- List of Indian winners and nominees of the Golden Globe Awards
- List of Indian winners and nominees of the British Academy Film Awards
