= Directorate of Film Festivals =

Indian government agency

- Formation: 1973
- Type: Government Agency
- Purpose: To organise International and National Film Festivals in India
- Headquarters: Siri Fort Auditorium Complex, New Delhi
- Region served: India
- Director: Senthil Rajan
- Parent organisation: Ministry of Information and Broadcasting
- Website: dff.gov.in

The Directorate of Film Festivals in India was an organisation that initiated and presented the International Film Festival of India, the National Film Awards and the Indian Panorama. Although the Directorate helped appoint members of the jury panels each year, it had no input on which films are selected for consideration and which films ultimately win awards at the various functions it initiates.

The Directorate set up by Ministry of Information and Broadcasting, Govt of India, to organise national and international film festivals in India.

It was set up by the Government of India in 1973, and works as part of the Ministry of Information and Broadcasting. The Directorate was based in New Delhi and its last director Senthil Rajan.

In March 2022, it was merged with National Film Development Corporation.

== Overview ==
The Directorate facilitates the participation of India in festivals abroad, and arranges for foreign film programmes to be held in the country.
