= List of submissions to the 96th Academy Awards for Best International Feature Film =

2023 Best International Feature submissions
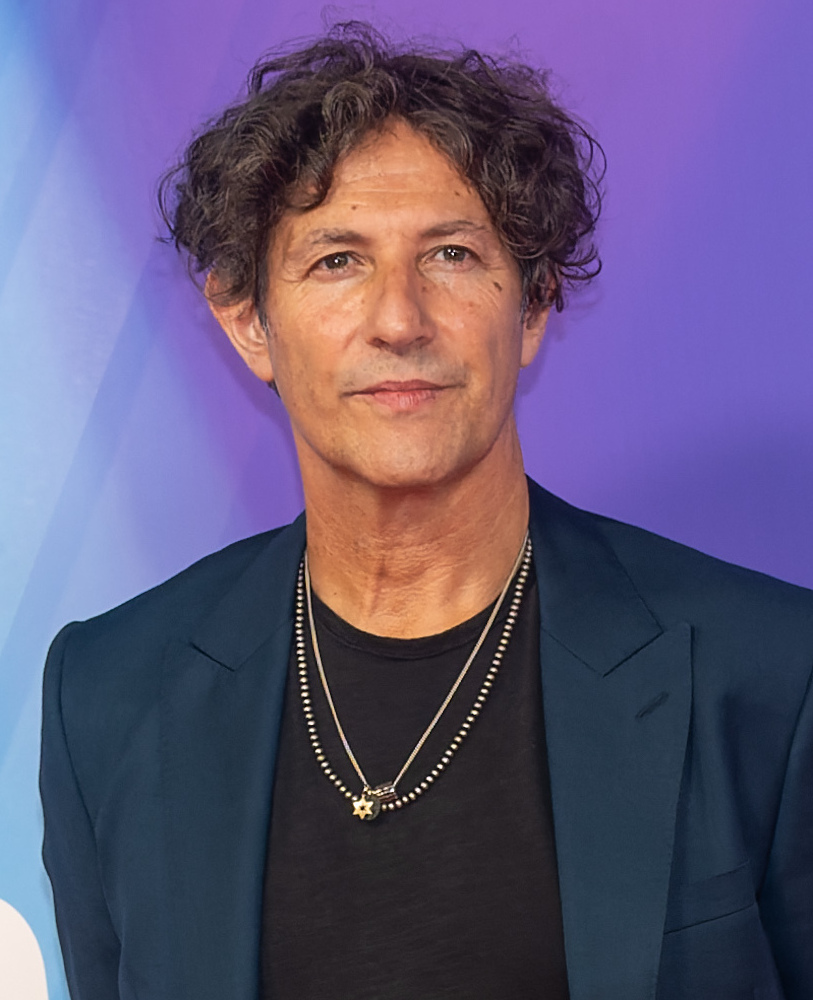
- Jonathan Glazer directed The Zone of Interest, which won the year's award.

Highlights
- Oscar winner: (United Kingdom) The Zone of Interest
- Submissions: 92
- Debuts: 1
- Total eligible: 88

This is a list of submissions to the 96th Academy Awards for the Best International Feature Film. The Academy of Motion Picture Arts and Sciences (AMPAS) has invited the film industries of various countries to submit their best film for the Academy Award for Best International Feature Film every year since the award was created in 1956. The award is presented annually by the Academy to a feature-length motion picture produced outside the United States that contains primarily non-English dialogue. The International Feature Film Award Committee oversees the process and reviews all the submitted films. The category was previously called the Best Foreign Language Film, but this was changed in April 2019 to Best International Feature Film, after the Academy deemed the word "Foreign" to be outdated.

For the 96th Academy Awards, the submitted motion pictures must have first been released theatrically in their respective countries between 1 December 2022 and 31 October 2023. The deadline for submissions to the Academy was 2 October 2023. 92 countries submitted films, and 88 were found to be eligible by AMPAS and screened for voters. Namibia submitted a film for the first time, while Burkina Faso made a submission for the first time since 1989. After the 15-film shortlist was announced on 21 December 2023, the five nominees were announced on 23 January 2024.

United Kingdom won the award for the first time with The Zone of Interest by Jonathan Glazer, which also won Best Sound, and was also nominated for Best Picture, Best Director and Best Adapted Screenplay.

== Submissions ==
Submitting country	Film title used in nomination	Original title	Language(s)	Director(s)	Result
Albania	Alexander	Aleksander	Albanian, English	Ardit Sadiku	Not nominated
Argentina	The Delinquents	Los delincuentes	Spanish	Rodrigo Moreno	Not nominated
Armenia	Amerikatsi	Ամերիկացի	Armenian, English, Russian	Michael A. Goorjian	Made shortlist
Australia	Shayda	پاییز شیدا	Persian, English	Noora Niasari	Not nominated
Austria	Vera		Italian	Tizza Covi and Rainer Frimmel	Not nominated
Bangladesh	No Ground Beneath the Feet	পায়ের তলায় মাটি নাই	Bengali	Mohammad Rabby Mridha	Not nominated
Belgium	Omen	Augure	French, Swahili, Lingala, English	Baloji	Not nominated
Bhutan	The Monk and the Gun		Dzongkha, English	Pawo Choyning Dorji	Made shortlist
Bolivia	The Visitor	El visitante	Spanish, South Bolivian Quechua	Martín Boulocq	Not nominated
Bosnia and Herzegovina	Excursion	Ekskurzija	Bosnian	Una Gunjak	Not nominated
Brazil	Pictures of Ghosts	Retratos Fantasmas	Brazilian Portuguese	Kleber Mendonça Filho	Not nominated
Bulgaria	Blaga's Lessons	Уроците на Блага	Bulgarian	Stephan Komandarev	Not nominated
Burkina Faso	Sira		French, Western Niger Fulfulde, Mooré	Apolline Traoré	Not nominated
Cameroon	Half Heaven		Cameroonian Pidgin English	Enah Johnscott	Not nominated
Canada	Rojek		Northern Kurdish, English, Arabic, French, German	Zaynê Akyol	Not nominated
Chile	The Settlers	Los colonos	Spanish, English	Felipe Gálvez Haberle	Not nominated
China	The Wandering Earth II	流浪地球2	Mandarin, English, Russian, French, Thai	Frant Gwo	Not nominated
Colombia	A Male	Un varón	Spanish	Fabián Hernández Alvarado	Not nominated
Costa Rica	I Have Electric Dreams	Tengo sueños eléctricos	Spanish, English	Valentina Maurel	Not nominated
Croatia	Traces	Tragovi	Croatian	Dubravka Turić	Not nominated
Cuba	Nelsito's World	El mundo de Nelsito	Spanish	Fernando Pérez	Disqualified
Czech Republic	Brothers	Bratři	Czech, German	Tomáš Mašín	Not nominated
Denmark	The Promised Land	Bastarden	Danish, German, Swedish, Norwegian	Nikolaj Arcel	Made shortlist
Dominican Republic	Cuarencena		Spanish	David Maler	Not nominated
Egypt	Voy! Voy! Voy!	!فوي! فوي! فوي	Arabic	Omar Hilal	Not nominated
Estonia	Smoke Sauna Sisterhood	Savvusanna sõsarad	Estonian, Seto, Võro	Anna Hints	Not nominated
Finland	Fallen Leaves	Kuolleet lehdet	Finnish, Arabic	Aki Kaurismäki	Made shortlist
France	The Taste of Things	La passion de Dodin Bouffant	French	Trần Anh Hùng	Made shortlist
Georgia	Citizen Saint	მოქალაქე წმინდანი	Georgian	Tinatin Kajrishvili	Not nominated
Germany	The Teachers' Lounge	Das Lehrerzimmer	German, English, Polish, Turkish	İlker Çatak	Nominated
Greece	Behind the Haystacks	Πίσω από τις θημωνιές	Greek, Arabic, Macedonian	Asimina Proedrou	Not nominated
Hong Kong	A Light Never Goes Out	燈火闌珊	Cantonese	Anastasia Tsang	Disqualified
Hungary	Four Souls of Coyote	Kojot négy lelke	Hungarian	Áron Gauder	Not nominated
Iceland	Godland	Volaða land / Vanskabte land	Danish, Icelandic	Hlynur Pálmason	Made shortlist
India	2018 – Everyone Is a Hero	2018: എവരിവൺ ഇസ് എ ഹീറോ	Malayalam	Jude Anthany Joseph	Not nominated
Indonesia	Autobiography		Indonesian	Makbul Mubarak	Not nominated
Iran	The Night Guardian	نگهبان شب	Persian, Azerbaijani	Reza Mirkarimi	Not nominated
Iraq	Hanging Gardens	جنائن معلقة	Arabic	Ahmed Yassin al-Daradji	Not nominated
Ireland	In the Shadow of Beirut	في ضلال بيروت	Arabic	Stephen Gerard Kelly and Garry Keane	Not nominated
Israel	Seven Blessings	שבע ברכות	Hebrew, Arabic, French, Judeo-Moroccan Arabic	Ayelet Menahemi	Not nominated
Italy	Io capitano		Wolof, French, Arabic, English, Italian	Matteo Garrone	Nominated
Japan	Perfect Days		Japanese	Wim Wenders	Nominated
Jordan	Inshallah a Boy	إن شاء الله ولد	Arabic	Amjad al-Rasheed	Not nominated
Kenya	Mvera		Swahili, English	Daudi Anguka	Not nominated
Kyrgyzstan	This Is What I Remember	Эсимде	Kyrgyz, Arabic	Aktan Arym Kubat	Disqualified
Latvia	My Freedom	Mana brīvība	Latvian, Russian	Ilze Kunga-Melgaile	Not nominated
Lithuania	Slow	Tu man nieko neprimeni	Lithuanian, Lithuanian Sign Language, English	Marija Kavtaradzė	Not nominated
Luxembourg	The Last Ashes	Läif a Séil	Luxembourgish, Ojibwe	Loïc Tanson	Not nominated
Malaysia	Tiger Stripes		Malay	Amanda Nell Eu	Not nominated
Mexico	Tótem		Spanish	Lila Avilés	Made shortlist
Moldova	Thunders	Tunete	Romanian	Ioane Bobeica	Not nominated
Mongolia	City of Wind	Сэр сэр салхи	Mongolian	Lkhagvadulam Purev-Ochir	Not nominated
Montenegro	Sirin		Montenegrin, English	Senad Šahmanović	Not nominated
Morocco	The Mother of All Lies	كذب أبيض	Arabic	Asmae el-Moudir	Made shortlist
Namibia	Under the Hanging Tree		Afrikaans, German, Herero, Khoekhoe, English	Perivi Katjavivi	Not nominated
Nepal	Halkara	हलकारा	Nepali	Bikram Sapkota	Not nominated
Netherlands	Sweet Dreams		Dutch, Indonesian	Ena Sendijarević	Not nominated
Nigeria	Mami Wata		Nigerian Pidgin, Fon	C.J. Obasi	Not nominated
North Macedonia	Housekeeping for Beginners	Домаќинство за почетници	Macedonian, Balkan Romani, Albanian, French	Goran Stolevski	Not nominated
Norway	Songs of Earth	Fedrelandet	Norwegian	Margreth Olin	Not nominated
Pakistan	In Flames	ان فلیمز	Urdu	Zarrar Kahn	Not nominated
Palestine	Bye Bye Tiberias	باي باي طبريا	French, Arabic	Lina Soualem	Not nominated
Panama	Tito, Margot & Me	Tito, Margot y Yo	Spanish, English	Mercedes Arias and Delfina Vidal	Not nominated
Paraguay	The Last Runway 2, Commando Yaguarete	Leal 2, Comando Yaguareté	Spanish, Guarani	Armando Aquino and Mauricio Rial	Not nominated
Peru	The Erection of Toribio Bardelli	La erección de Toribio Bardelli	Spanish	Adrián Saba	Not nominated
Philippines	The Missing	Iti Mapukpukaw	Ilocano, Filipino	Carl Joseph Papa	Not nominated
Poland	The Peasants	Chłopi	Polish	DK and Hugh Welchman	Not nominated
Portugal	Bad Living	Mal Viver	Portuguese	João Canijo	Not nominated
Romania	Do Not Expect Too Much from the End of the World	Nu aștepta prea mult de la sfârșitul lumii	Romanian, English, German, Hungarian, Italian	Radu Jude	Not nominated
Saudi Arabia	Alhamour H.A.	الھامور ح.ع	Arabic	Abdulelah al-Qurashi	Not nominated
Senegal	Banel & Adama	Banel et Adama	Pulaar, French	Ramata-Toulaye Sy	Not nominated
Serbia	The Duke and the Poet	Што се боре мисли моје	Serbian, English	Milorad Milinković	Not nominated
Singapore	The Breaking Ice	燃冬	Mandarin, Korean, English	Anthony Chen	Not nominated
Slovakia	Photophobia	Svetloplachosť / Фотофобія / Světloplachost	Ukrainian, Russian	Ivan Ostrochovský and Pavol Pekarčík	Not nominated
Slovenia	Riders	Jezdeca	Slovene, Croatian	Dominik Mencej	Not nominated
South Africa	Music Is My Life		Zulu, English	Mpumi Mbele	Not nominated
South Korea	Concrete Utopia	콘크리트 유토피아	Korean	Um Tae-hwa	Not nominated
Spain	Society of the Snow	La sociedad de la nieve	Spanish	J. A. Bayona	Nominated
Sudan	Goodbye Julia	وداعا جوليا	Arabic	Mohamed Kordofani	Not nominated
Sweden	Opponent	Motståndaren	Swedish, Persian	Milad Alami	Not nominated
Switzerland	Thunder	Foudre	French	Carmen Jaquier	Not nominated
Taiwan	Marry My Dead Body	關於我和鬼變成家人的那件事	Mandarin, Taiwanese Hokkien	Cheng Wei-hao	Not nominated
Tajikistan	Melody	ملودی / Мелодия	Persian, Tajik	Behrouz Sebt Rasoul	Not on the final list
Thailand	Not Friends	เพื่อน(ไม่)สนิท	Thai	Atta Hemwadee	Not nominated
Tunisia	Four Daughters	بنات ألفة / Les filles d'Olfa	Arabic, French	Kaouther Ben Hania	Made shortlist
Turkey	About Dry Grasses	Kuru Otlar Üstüne	Turkish	Nuri Bilge Ceylan	Not nominated
Ukraine	20 Days in Mariupol	20 днів у Маріуполі	Ukrainian, Russian, English	Mstyslav Chernov	Made shortlist
United Kingdom	The Zone of Interest		German, Polish, Yiddish	Jonathan Glazer	Won Academy Award
Uruguay	Family Album	Temas propios	Spanish, English	Guillermo Rocamora	Not nominated
Venezuela	The Shadow of the Sun	La sombra del sol	Spanish, Venezuelan Sign Language	Miguel Ángel Ferrer	Not nominated
Vietnam	Glorious Ashes	Tro tàn rực rỡ	Vietnamese	Bùi Thạc Chuyên	Not nominated
Yemen	The Burdened	المرهقون	Arabic	Amr Gamal	Not nominated

== Notes ==
- Cuba's submission was reported to be Nelsito's World by Fernando Pérez. In October 2023, the film was included in one of the Oscar selection committee's official group assignments alongside the 88 other films, but was reportedly found "ineligible" and the film did not appear on the Academy's final official list in December 2023.
- Hong Kong submitted A Light Never Goes Out by Anastasia Tsang, but it was disqualified by the Academy. One member of Hong Kong's 13-person selection committee was an actor in the film, which the Academy deemed a conflict of interest. Hong Kong declined an invitation to submit a second film.
- Iran's government-controlled Farabi Cinema Foundation submitted The Night Guardian by Reza Mirkarimi. The selection was criticized by the dissident Iranian Independent Filmmaker Association (IIFMA), who asked the Academy to consider an alternative film. They released a press statement saying: "Over the past year, Iranian filmmakers have been imprisoned, interrogated and intimidated with Farabi being a key player in implementing this severe repression." IIFMA contended that The Night Guardian was not reflective of the year's work by Iranian filmmakers, who were largely working independently of the Iranian government or in exile.
- Kazakhstan's Oscar selection committee announced they received four submissions and considered two of them: Ademoka's Education by Adilkhan Yerzhanov and Bauryna Salu by Askhat Kuchinchirekov. Ademoka's Education received two votes and Bauryna Salu received one vote, while four committee members abstained. The committee decided not to submit either film but Bauryna Salu was submitted the following year.
- Kosovo's Cinematography Center announced on 27 September 2023 that their selection committee unanimously decided not to submit a film despite receiving four submissions: Actors of Cannes by Mentor Spahiu, The Albanian Virgin by Bujar Alimani, I Love You More by Erblin Nushi, and The Land Within by Fisnik Maxville. In a statement, Maxville said that the decision not to send any film "hurts our young country's blooming film industry. It is quite hard to understand how Kosovo has invested in the different films... and then refuses to further that investment by sending a film — any film — to showcase Kosovo's vibrant new cinema scene to the Oscars." This leaves the country absent for the first time since they began submitting films in 2014.
- Kyrgyzstan submitted This Is What I Remember by Aktan Arym Kubat, but it was not included in the final list because it was released in Kyrgyzstan on 18 November 2022, two weeks prior to the eligibility window. Kyrgyzstan declined an invitation to submit a second film, contending that the window had yet not been known when the release was scheduled so it was impossible to plan ahead for the qualification.
- Russia's state media reported that the national Oscar selection committee had suspended its operations and would not submit a film. A former committee member said that submitting a film would "look extremely inappropriate" in light of international sanctions on Russia due to the Russian invasion of Ukraine. Russia cited similar reasons for not submitting a film in 2022.
- Tajikistan's submission was reported to be Melody by Behrouz Sebt Rasoul. though it did not appear on the final list. It was not included on the assignment lists sent to Academy members who volunteered to participate in first-round voting, reportedly because the country did not have its selection committee approved by AMPAS in advance. It was allowed to be submitted the following year by a new committee approved by AMPAS.
- The Oscar selection committees for Cambodia, Malawi, Malta, Uganda and Zambia invited filmmakers to make submissions, but did not end up sending films.
