= 54th International Film Festival of India =

2023 Indian film festival

- Official poster
- Opening film: Catching Dust by Stuart Gatt
- Closing film: The Featherweight by Robert Kolodny
- Location: Dr. Shyama Prasad Mukherjee Indoor Stadium at Panaji, Goa, India
- Founded: 1952
- Awards: Golden Peacock: Endless Borders by Abbas Amini; Silver Peacock: Best Director: Stephan Komandarev for Blaga's Lessons; Best Actor: Pouria Rahimi Sam from Endless Borders; Best Actress: Mélanie Thierry from Party of Fools; ICFT INESCO Gandhi Medal: Drift by Anthony Chen; Satyajit Ray Lifetime Achievement Award: Michael Douglas; Special Recognition for Contribution to Bharatiya Cinema Award: Madhuri Dixit; Best Web Series: Panchayat Season 2
- Hosted by: Government of Goa; Directorate of Film Festivals
- No. of films: 270 films from 105 countries; 198 in International section; 19 award-winning films; 13 world premieres
- Festival date: Opening: 20 November 2023; Closing: 28 November 2023
- Website: iffigoa.org

International Film Festival of India
- 55th 53rd

The 54th International Film Festival of India opened on 20 November 2023 with Catching Dust by Stuart Gatt in Goa. Shekhar Kapur, an Indian filmmaker, served as chairperson of the international jury. A new award category, Best Web Series Award, was introduced at this edition of the festival. 32 entries in 10 languages from 15 Over-the-top media service platforms were selected to compete for this award.

The festival closed on 28 November with American biographical sports drama film The Featherweight by Robert Kolodny. In the ceremony Hollywood actor-producer Michael Douglas was honoured with the Satyajit Ray Lifetime Achievement Award, and the Persian film Endless Borders by Abbas Amini, received the Golden Peacock award for the best film; whereas Stephan Komandarev won the Silver Peacock award for best director for the Bulgarian film Blaga's Lessons.

== Opening and closing ceremonies ==
=== Opening ceremony ===
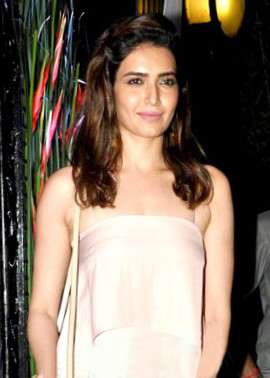
Karishma Tanna, host opening ceremony

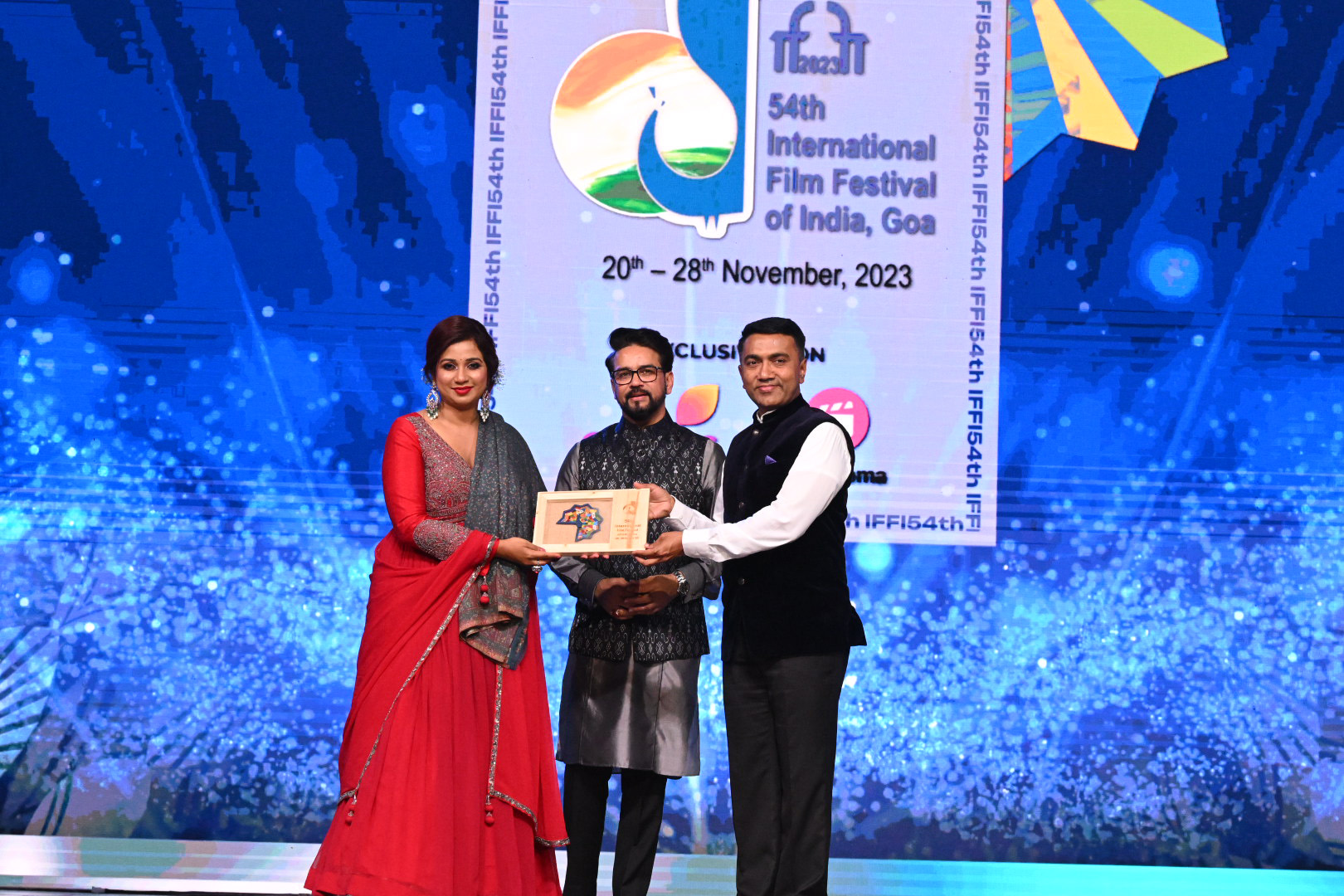
Shreya Ghoshal, at the opening ceremony

The opening ceremony on 20 November 2023, hosted by Karishma Tanna and Aparshakti Khurana was aired live on Colors TV and JioCinema. In this edition over 270 films from 105 countries were screened. Madhuri Dixit was felicitated with the ‘Special Recognition for Contribution to Bharatiya Cinema’ award at the festival. It was also streamed live on YouTube.

=== Closing ceremony ===
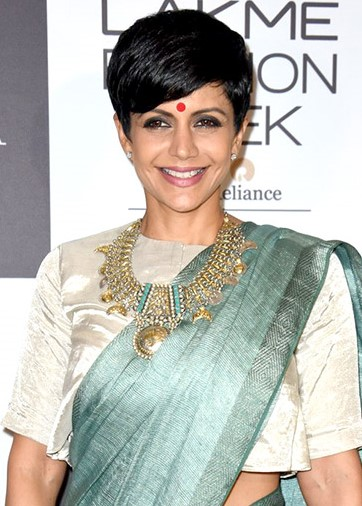
Mandira Bedi, host closing ceremony

The festival closed on 28 November with The Featherweight an American biographical sports drama film on professional boxer Willie Pep by Robert Kolodny. Mandira Bedi hosted the closing ceremony, which was also streamed live on YouTube, in addition to broadcast on Colours TV channel.

== Events ==
- Master classes and in conversation: Masterclasses and In Conversation sessions with filmmakers, cinematographers, and actors were held at Kala Academy at Festival Mile, Panjim, during the festival. Michael Douglas American filmmaker, Brendan Galvin American poet, Brillante Mendoza Filipino independent filmmaker, Sunny Deol, Rani Mukerjee, Vidya Balan, John Goldwater, Vijay Sethupathi, Sara Ali Khan, Pankaj Tripathi, Nawazuddin Siddiqui, Kay Kay Menon, Karan Johar, Madhur Bhandarkar, Manoj Bajpayee, Kartiki Gonsalves, Boney Kapoor, Allu Aravind, Theodore Gluck and Gulshan Grover among others were the guest speakers.
- Gala Premiers: Actors of the films having gala premiers at festival had talent walk on the red carpet to promote their films.
- Film Bazaar: It concluded on 24 November with around 1250 delegates attending the Bazaar.
- 75 Creative Minds of Tomorrow: In competition of creating a short film in 48 hours on the theme of 'The Mission Life', Odh, a short film about the receding beach lines of Goa, bagged the best film award in '75 Creative Minds of Tomorrow' initiative.

== Jury ==
=== International Jury ===
In addition to the Golden Peacock for best film, the Jury decides the winners in the Best Director, Best Actor (Male), Best Actor (Female) and Special Jury Prize categories. The following are the members of the International Jury:

- Shekhar Kapur, Indian filmmaker, Chairperson
- José Luis Alcaine, Spanish cinematographer
- Jerome Paillard, French film producer of international films
- Catherine Dussart, French film producer of international films
- Helen Leake, Australian film producer

=== Feature film jury ===
The Feature Films Jury headed by T.S Nagabharana is as follows:

- T. S. Nagabharana, chairperson, Indian film director
- Karthik Raja, Indian composer
- Anjan Bose, filmmaker, producer, distributor
- Iti Rani Samanta, Indian columnist, journalist and film producer
- K. P. Vyasan, Indian film director
- Kamlesh Mishra, film director
- Kiran Ganti, film editor
- Milind Lele, film director
- Pradip Kurbah, film director
- Rama Vij, Indian actress
- Romi Meitei, Indian film director and lyricist
- Sanjay Jadhav, Indian cinematographer
- Vijay Pande, film director and editor

=== Non-feature film jury ===
The Jury headed by Shri Arvind Sinha, has following seven member:

- Arvind Sinha, chairperson, documentary filmmaker
- Arvind Pandey; film director and writer
- Bobby Wahengbam; Indian filmmaker, producer, writer and film critic
- Dip Bhuyan; film director
- Kamlesh Udasi; film director and producer
- Paushali Ganguli; animator, film director and screenwriter
- Varun Kurtkoti; film director

=== Best web series (OTT) award jury ===
Rajkumar Hirani is serving as the head of the jury for the 'best web series (OTT)' award.

- Rajkumar Hirani, Indian filmmaker, director, producer, and editor
- Divya Dutta, Indian actress and model
- Prosenjit Chatterjee, Indian actor and producer
- Krishna DK Indian filmmaker
- Utpal Borpujari, filmmaker and film critic

=== 75 Creative Minds of Tomorrow ===
==== Grand Jury ====
- Shreya Ghoshal, Playback Singer
- A. Sreekar Prasad, Editor
- Manoj Joshi, Actor
- Veera Kapur, Costume designer and make-up artist
- Priya Seth, Cinematographer
- Saraswathi Vani Balgam, Animator, VFX artist and AR-VR developer
- Saleel Kulkarni, Music composer
- Umesh Shukla, Filmmaker
- Sabu Cyril, Art director
- Aseem Arora, Screenwriter

==== Selection Jury ====
- Manoj Tiger, Actor
- Nidhi Hegde, Actress
- Abhishek Jain, Filmmaker
- Manish Sharma, Filmmaker
- Charudutt Acharya, Screenwriter
- Deepak Kingrani, Screenwriter
- Charuvi Agrawal, Animator, VFX artist and AR-VR developer
- Deepak Singh, Animator, VFX artist and AR-VR developer
- Naveen Nooli, Editor
- Suresh Pai, Editor
- Dharam Gulati, Cinematographer
- Subhransu Das, Cinematographer
- Nachiket Barve, Costume designer and make-up artist
- Bishakh Jyoti, Playback singer
- Anmol Bhave, Music composer
- Sabyasachi Bose, Art director

== Official selection ==
Sections

- Gala Premiere
- Kaleidoscope section
- Golden Peacock Award
- Films for debut competition
- ICFT UNESCO Gandhi Medal
- Docu-Montage
- Intergrade
- Animation
- Macabre Dreams
- Indian Panorama
  - Feature films
  - Mainstream Cinema Section
  - Non-feature films
- Indian Cinema 2023
  - Accessible India – Accessible Films
  - Special screening
- Cinema of the World
- Restored Classics
- UNICEF @ IFFI

=== Opening and closing films ===
Year	English title	Original title	Director(s)	Production countrie(s)
Opening films
2023	Catching Dust		Stuart Gatt	United Kingdom
Indian Panorama feature film
2023	Aattam		Anand Ekarshi	India
Indian Panorama non-feature film
2023	Andro Dreams		Longjam Meena Devi	India
Mid fest film
2023	About Dry Grasses	Kuru Otlar Üstüne	Nuri Bilge Ceylan	Turkey, France, Germany
Closing film
2023	The Featherweight		Robert Kolodny	United States

=== Gala Premiere ===
English title	Original title	Director(s)	Language
Dear Jassi		Tarsem Singh	Punjabi, English
Dhootha		Vikram Kumar	Telugu
Dil Hai Gray		Susi Ganesan	Hindi
Farrey		Soumendra Padhi	Hindi
Gandhi Talks		Kishor Pandurang Belekar	Silent
Grey Games		Gangadhar Salimath	Kannada
Hurry Om Hurry		Nisarg Vaidya	Gujarati
Kadak Singh		Aniruddha Roy Chowdhury	Hindi
Rautu Ki Beli		Anand Surapur	Hindi
The Village		Milind Rau	Tamil

=== Kaleidoscope section ===
18 films were shortlisted for screening under Kaleidoscope section.

Year	English title	Original title	Director(s)	Production countrie(s)
2023	Anatomy of a Fall	Anatomie d'une chute	Justine Triet	France
2023	Close Your Eyes	Cerrar los ojos	Víctor Erice	Spain, Argentina
2023	Cobweb	거미집	Kim Jee-woon	South Korea
2023	Concrete Utopia	콘크리트 유토피아	Um Tae-hwa	South Korea
2023	Elegies	詩	Ann Hui	Hong Kong
2023	Essential Truths of the Lake		Lav Diaz	Denmark, Germany, Sweden, France, Philippines, Portugal, Singapore, Italy, Switzerland, United Kingdom
2023	Eureka		Lisandro Alonso	France, Germany, Mexico, Argentina, Portugal
2023	How to Have Sex		Molly Manning Walker	United Kingdom
2023	Io capitano		Matteo Garrone	Italy, Belgium
2023	Lost in the Night	Perdidos en la noche	Amat Escalante	Mexico, Germany
2023	Memory		Michel Franco	Mexico, United States
2023	MMXX		Cristi Puiu	Romania
2023	Moro		Brillante Mendoza	Philippines
2023	Scrapper		Charlotte Regan	United Kingdom
2023	Snow Leopard	雪豹	Pema Tseden	China
2023	The Zone of Interest		Jonathan Glazer	United States, United Kingdom, Poland
2023	Upon Open Sky	A Cielo Abierto	Mariana Arriaga, Santiago Arriaga	Mexico, Spain
2023	Yannick		Quentin Dupieux	France

=== Golden Peacock Award ===
15 international and Indian fiction feature films competed for the Golden Peacock Award

Highlighted title indicates award winner

Year	English title	Original title	Director(s)	Production countrie(s)
2023	Andragogy	Budi Pekerti	Wregas Bhanuteja	Indonesia
2023	Blaga's Lessons	Уроците на Блага	Stephan Komandarev	Bulgaria, Germany
2023	Bosnian Pot		Pavo Marinković	Croatia
2023	Endless Borders		Abbas Amini	Iran
2023	Hoffman's Fairy Tales		Tina Barkalaya	Russia
2023	Lubo		Giorgio Diritti	Italy, Switzerland
2023	Measures of Men	Der vermessene Mensch	Lars Kraume	Germany
2023	Party of Fools		Arnaud des Pallières	France
2022	The Other Widow	הפילגש	Ma'Ayan Rypp	Israel
2023	Woman Of...	Kobieta z...	Małgorzata Szumowska, Michał Englert	Poland, Sweden
2023	Asog		Seán Devlin	Canada, Philippines
2023	Die Before Death	Umri prije smrti	Ahmed Imamovic	Bosnia And Herzegovina
2022	Kantara	ಕಾಂತಾರ	Rishab Shetty	India
2023	Sanaa		Sudhanshu Saria	India
2022	Mirbeen		Mridul Gupta	India

=== Films for debut competition ===
This competition category is a platform for upcoming filmmakers from India and abroad. Seven debut films were nominated in this category.

Highlighted title indicates award winner

Year	English title	Original title	Director(s)	Production countrie(s)
2023	Almost Entirely A Slight Disaster		Umut Subaşı	Turkey
2023	Let Me Go		Maxime Rappaz	Switzerland
2023	Ocarina		Alban Zogjani	Albania
2023	Sleep	잠	Jason Yu	South Korea
2022	When The Seedlings Grow		Rêger Azad Kaya	Syrian Arab Republic
2023	Dhai Aakhar		Parveen Arora	India
2023	Iratta		Rohit M.G. Krishnan	India

=== IFFI ICFT UNESCO Gandhi Medal ===
Highlighted title indicates award winner

Year	English title	Original title	Director(s)	Production countrie(s)
2022	A House In Jerusalem		Muayad Alayan	Palestine, UK, Germany, Netherlands, Qatar
2023	Citizen Saint		Tinatin Kajrishvili	Georgia
2023	Drift		Anthony Chen	UK, France, Greece
2023	Sira		Apolline Traoré	Burkina Faso, France, Germany, Senegal
2022	Kalev		Ove Musting	Estonian, Russian
2022	The Prize!	Onde Mande!	Paul Fauzan Agusta	Indonesia
2022	The Sugar Experiment		John Tornblad	Sweden
2023	Mandali		Rakesh Chaturvadi Om	India
2022	Malikappuram		Vishnu Sasi Shankar	India
2023	Rabindra Kabya Rahasya		Sayantan Ghosal	India

=== Docu-Montage ===
This section comprises documentaries & docu-drama.

English title	Original title	Director(s)	Production countrie(s)
AI:African Intelligence		Manthia Diawara	Portugal
And The King Said, What A Fantastic Machine		Axel Danielson, Maximilien Van Aertryck	Sweden, Denmark
Casablanca		Adriano Valerio	France, Italy
Luto		Andres Arochi Tinajero	Mexico
Revenge: Our Dad The Nazi Killer		Danny Ben-Moshe	Australia
Room 999	Chambre 999	Lubna Playoust	France
Samuel and the Light	Samuel ea luz	Vinícius Girnys	France
The Last Days Of Humanity	Gli Ultimi Giorni Dell'Umanità	Enrico Ghezzi, Alessandro Gagliardo	Italy
The Trial	El Juico	Ulises de la Orden	Argentina
Vista Mare		Julia Gutweniger, Florian Kofler	Austria

=== Intergrade ===
English title	Original title	Director(s)	Production countrie(s)
Divinity		Eddie Alcazar	United States
He Thought He Died		Isiah Medina	Canada
Knit's Island		Ekiem Barbier, Guilhem Causse, Quentin L’helgoualc’h	France
Once Within a Time		Godfrey Reggio, Jon Kane	United States
Omen	Augure	Baloji	Belgium, Netherlands, Democratic Republic of Congo

=== Animation ===
English title	Original title	Director(s)	Production countrie(s)
3 Little Kungpoo Goats	The Gools	Kianoush Dalvand, Farzad Dalvand	United Arab Emirates
Bim		Tom Van Gestel	Belgium
Four Souls of Coyote	Kojot négy lelke	Aron Gauder	Hungary
Sirocco and the Kingdom of the Winds	Sirocco Et Le Royaume Des Courants D'Air	Benoit Chieux	Belgium, France
The Other Shape	La otra forma	Diego Felipe Guzmán	Colombia
The Peasants	Chłopi	Dorota Kobiela, Hugh Welchman	Poland, Serbia, Lithuania
Toldi	Toldi	Marcell Jankovics	Hungary
Little Singham Bahubali Friends		Ankur Chauhan	India
Dr. Minestein		Sonali Jawale	India
Prabho Shivaji Raja		Nilesh Muley	India
Return of the Jungle		Vaibhav Kumaresh	India
The Light		Team of Godlywood Studio	India

=== Macabre Dreams ===
English title	Original title	Director(s)	Production countrie(s)
Lumberjack the Monster	Kaibutsu no Kikori	Takashi Miike	Japan
Sorcery	Brujería	Christopher Murray	Chile, Mexico, Germany
The Cuckoo’s Curse	El Cuco	Mar Targarona	Spain, Germany
We Have Never Been Modern	Úsvit	Matěj Chlupáček	Czech Republic

=== Indian Panorama ===
In Indian Panorama feature and non-feature films of cinematic, thematic, and aesthetic excellence are selected for the promotion of film art through the non-profit screening of these films under different categories.

==== Feature films ====
India's entry for the 2024 Academy Awards, Malayalam-language film 2018, was screened in the Indian Panorama 'Mainstream Cinema Section'. 25 Feature films reflecting the vibrancy and diversity of the Indian film Industry have been selected out of 408 contemporary films for screening.

Title of the Film	Language	Director(s)	Producer(s)
Aaraariraaro	Kannada	Sandeep Kumar V	TMT Productions
Ardhangini	Bengali	Kaushik Ganguly	Surinder Films
Aattam	Malayalam	Anand Ekarshi	Joy Movie Productions
Deep Fridge	Bengali	Arjunn Dutta	Colors of Dream Entertainment
Dhai Aakhar	Hindi	Parveen Arora	Kabir Communication
Iratta	Malayalam	Rohit M.G. Krishnan	Appu Attu Pappu Production House
Kaadhal Enbathu Pothu Udamai	Tamil	Jayaprakash Radhakrishnan	Mankind Cinema
Kaathal – The Core	Malayalam	Jeo Baby	Mammootty Kampany
Kantara	Kannada	Rishab Shetty	Hombale Films
Malikappuram	Malayalam	Vishnu Sasi Shankar	Kavya Film Company
Mandali	Hindi	Rakesh Chaturvadi Om	Reltek
Mirbeen	Karbi	Mridul Gupta	Dhani Ram Tisso
Neela Nira Sooriyan	Tamil	Samyuktha Vijayan	Samyuktha Vijayan Film
Nna Thaan Case Kodu	Malayalam	Ratheesh Balakrishna Poduval	Udaya Studios
Pookkaalam	Malayalam	Ganesh Raj	CNC Cinemas
Rabindra Kabya Rahasya	Bengali	Sayantan Ghosal	Esskay Movies
Sanaa	Hindi	Sudhanshu Saria	Four Line
The Vaccine War	Hindi	Vivek Agnihotri	I am Buddha
Vadh	Hindi	Jaspal Singh Sandhu	Luv Films
Viduthalai Part 2	Tamil	Vetrimaaran	RS Infotainment

==== Mainstream Cinema Section ====
Title of the Film	Language	Director(s)	Producer(s)
2018	Malayalam	Jude Anthany Joseph	Kavya Film Company
Gulmohar	Hindi	Rahul V. Chittella	Star Studios
Ponniyin Selvan: II	Tamil	Mani Ratnam	Madras Talkies
Sirf Ek Bandaa Kaafi Hai	Hindi	Apoorv Singh Karki	Zee Studio
The Kerala Story	Hindi	Sudipto Sen	Sunshine Pictures

==== Non-feature Films ====
20 Non-feature films selected in the 'Indian Panorama' are as follows:

Title of the Film	Language	Director(s)
1947: Brexit India	English	Sanjivan Lal
Andro Dreams	Manipuri	Longjam Meena Devi
Baasan	Hindi	Jitank Singh Gurjar
Back To The Future	English	M.S. Bisht
Baruar Xongxar	Assamese	Utpal Borpujari
Behrupiya - The Impersonator	Hindi	Bhasker Vishwanathan
Bhangaar	Marathi	Sumira Roy
Nansei Nilam (Changing Landscape)	Tamil	Pravin Selvam
Chupi Roh	Dogri	Disha Bhardwaj
Giddh (The Scavenger)	Hindi	Manish Saini
Kathabor	Assamese	Keshar Jyoti Das
Lachit (The Warrior)	Assamese	Parthasarathi Mahanta
Last Meet	Manipuri	Waribam Dorendra Singh
Life In Loom	Hindi, Tamil, Assamese, Bengali, English	Edmond Ranson
Mau: The Spirit Dreams Of Cheraw	Mizo	Shilpika Bordoloi
Pradakshina	Marathi	Prathamesh Mahale
Sadabahar	Konkani	Suyash Kamat
Sri Rudram	Malayalam	Ananda Jyothi
The Sea & Seven Villages	Oriya	Himansu Sekhar Khatua
Utsavmurti	Marathi	Abhijeet Arvind

=== Indian Cinema 2023 ===
==== Accessible India – Accessible Films ====
Year	English title	Original title	Director(s)	Language
2021	83		Kabir Khan	Hindi, English
2023	Sirf Ek Bandaa Kaafi Hai		Apoorv Singh Karki	Hindi
2021	Shershaah		Vishnuvardhan	Hindi
2013	Bhaag Milkha Bhaag		Rakeysh Omprakash Mehra	Hindi

==== Special screening ====
English title	Original title	Director(s)	Language
Gond Janjati Ki Veerangana Rani Durgawati		Ashok Sharan	Hindi

=== Cinema of the World ===
English title	Original title	Director(s)	Production countrie(s)
A Golden Life		Boubacar Sangaré	Burkina Faso
A Ravaging Wind	El viento que arrasa	Paula Hernández	Argentina, Uruguay
A Real Job	Un métier sérieux	Thomas Lilti	France
A Strange Path		Guto Parente	Brazil
Adentro		Javier Solórzano Casarin	Mexico
Adiós Buenos Aires		German Kral	Argentina
Alemania		María Zanetti	Argentina, Spain
Ali Topan		Sidharta Tata	Indonesia
All to Play For	Rien à perdre	Delphine Deloget	France
All Will Be Revealed	Arbeitstitel Der Totengräber im Buchsbaum	Peter Keglevic	Austria
Another Day Of Hope		Taifeng Liu	China
Antarctica Calling	Voyage au pôle Sud	Luc Jacquet	France
Aziz		Majid Tavakoli	Iran
Bela América		António Ferreira	Portugal
Blind At Heart		Barbara Albert	Germany, Switzerland
Brand Bollywood Downunder		Anupam Sharma	Australia
Blockade	Blokád	Adam Toser	Hungary
Ceylin		Tufan Simsekcan	Turkey
Children of God		Joan Girbau Xalabarder	Spain
Chronicles Of A Wandering Saint	Crónicas De Una Santa Errante	Tomás Gómez Bustillo	Argentina
Clap Your Hands	Xing Fu Zhi Lu	Zhu Jie	China
Comandante		Edoardo De Angelis	Italy
Dancing on the Edge of a Volcano		Cyril Aris	Germany, Lebanon
Dauren's Wedding		Lim Chan-ik	South Korea
Dignity		Dimitris Katsimiris	Greece
Endless Summer Syndrome	Le Syndrome de L'été Sans Fin	Kaveh Daneshmand	Czech Republic
Extra Lesson	Dopolnitelnyy Urok	Anna Kurbatova	Russian Federation
Family Album	Temas Propios	Guillermo Rocamora	Uruguay
Fereshteh		Morteza Atashzamzam	Bangladesh
Fez Summer '55		Abdelhai Laraki	Morocco
Fight Like A Girl		Matthew Leutwyler	Rwanda
Flaming Cloud	San Gui Qing Shi	Liu Siyi	China
Fog	Tuman	Natalia Gugueva	Russian Federation
Fortune For All		Yao Ramesar	Trinidad and Tobago
Fragile Blood	Zilās asinis	Una Celma	Latvia
Franky Five Star		Birgit Möller	Germany
From The End Of The World	Sekai no owarikara	Kazuaki Kiriya	Japan
Giants Of Easter Island		Dover Kosashvili	Israel
God’s Gift		Asel Zhuraeva	Kyrgyzstan
GOL!ATH		Roberto Marra, Stefano Salvatori	Italy
Good Autumn, Mommy		Shizhong Chen	China
Homecoming		Catherine Corsini	France
Hotel Pula		Andrej Korovljev	Croatia
Hungry Ghost Diner		We Jun Cho	Malaysia
Iman		Kyriacos Tofarides and Corinna Avraamidou	Cyprus
Insular		Héctor Manuel Valdez	Dominican Republic
L'Anima In Pace		Ciro Formisano	Italy
Latido		Katina Medina Mora	México
Life		Emir Baigazin	Kazakhstan
Lonely Yurt		Begars Yelubaev	Kazakhstan
Lost Country		Vladimir Perišić	Serbia, France, Luxemburg, Croatia
Lucette		Mburucuya Victoria Fleitas & Oscar Javier Ayala	Paraguay
Malqueridas		Tana Gilbert	Chile, Germany
Mandoob	مندوب الليل	Ali Kalthami	Saudi Arabia
Melody		Behrouz Sebt Rasoul	Tajikistan
Mighty Afrin: In The Time Of Floods		Angelos Rallis	Greece, France
Mommy's Lambie		Umut Evirgen	Turkey
Montevideo Unit		Tatyana Lyutaeva	Russian Federation
Mountain Onion		Eldar Shibanov	Kazakhstan
My Aunt Gilma		Alexandra Henao	Venezuela, Bolivarian Republic
Not A Word		Hanna Slak	Germany
Once Upon a Time in the Andes		Rómulo Sulca	Peru
Öte		Malik Isasis & Esra Saydam	United States
Palimpsest		Hanna Västinsalo	Finland
Rain Town		Tunku Mona Riza Tunku Khalid	Malaysia
Seagrass		Meredith Hama-Brown	Canada
Seneca – On the Creation of Earthquakes	Seneca – Oder: Über die Geburt von Erdbeben	Robert Schwentke	Germany
Seventh Heaven		Jasna Nanut	Croatia
Shame on Dry Land	Syndabocken	Axel Petersén	Sweden, Malta
Sharp Wounds		Mariana Musalem Ramos	Mexico
Sima's Unfinished Narration		Alireza Samadi Samadi	Iran
Snowstorm		Sabit Kurmanbekov	Kazakhstan
Stepne		Maryna Vroda	Ukraine, Germany, Poland, Slovakia
Suffocated		Luciano Podcaminsky	Argentina, Costa Rica
Sunday	Yakshanba	Shokir Kholikov	Uzbekistan
The Accident		Bruno Carboni	Brazil
The Beautiful Summer		Laura Luchetti	Italy
The Bubble		Miguel Angel Rocca	Argentina
The Chapel		Dominique Deruddere	Belgium
The Drunk		André Marques	Portugal
The Fisherman's Daughter		Edgar de Luque Jácome	Colombia
The Gospel Of The Beast		Sheron Dayoc	Philippines
The Invisible Steps Through Latin America		Johnny Mauricio González Zuñiga	Costa Rica
The Land Where Winds Stood Still		Ardak Amirkulov	Kazakhstan
The Last Birthday		Navid Mahmoudi	Afghanistan
The Punishment		Matías Bize	Chile
The Reeds		Cemil Ağacıkoğlu	Turkey, Bulgaria
Thiiird		Karim Kassem	Lebanon
This Place		V. T. Nayani	Canada
Three Sparks		Naomi Uman	Albania
Thunders		Ioane Bobeica	Moldova
Toll	Pedágio	Carolina Markowicz	Brazil, Portugal
Twenty20		Wong Kwang Han	Singapore
Toxic		Stefan Vorzacek	Czech Republic
Tzadik	Праведник	Sergei Ursuliak	Russia
Under The Naked Sky		Lilian Sijbesma	Netherlands
Wake Me		Marko Santic	Slovenia
Wheatfield		Anabel Caso	Mexico
Whispering Mountains		Jagath Manuwarna	Sri Lanka
Wild		Shahrareh Soroosh	Iran
When Fucking Spring Is In The Air		Danyael Sugawara	Netherlands, Belgium, Germany

The Melody movie, written, directed, produced, and edited by Behrouz Sebt Rasoul, was selected as the Tajik entry for the Best International Feature Film at the 96th Academy Awards,

=== Restored classics ===
The birth centenary of actor Dev Anand is celebrated with restored versions of some of his classics. There are three internationally restored films also in this section. Four regional films are also screened in this section.

Year	English title	Original title	Director(s)	Production countrie(s)
1962	Bees Saal Baad		Biren Nag	India
1937	Bidyapati		Debaki Bose	India
1974	Chorus		Mrinal Sen	India
1965	Guide		Vijay Anand	India
1964	Haqeeqat		Chetan Anand	India
1951	Pathala Bhairavi		K. V. Reddy	India
1965	Shadows of Forgotten Ancestors	Тіні забутих предків	Sergei Parajanov	Ukraine
1953	Shyamchi Aai	श्यामची आई	P. K. Atre	India
1973	The Exorcist		William Friedkin	USA
1990	Twilight	Szürkület	György Fehér	Hungary

=== UNICEF @ IFFI ===
Year	English title	Original title	Director(s)	Production countrie(s)
1996	Damu	দামু	Raja Sen	India
2023	For the Sake of Ava		Mohsen Seraji	Iran
2023	Gandhi & Co.		Manish Saini	India
2022	Peacock Lament		Sanjeewa Pushpakumara	Sri Lanka
2022	Singo		Alireza Mohammadi Rouzbahany	Iran

== Awards and winners ==
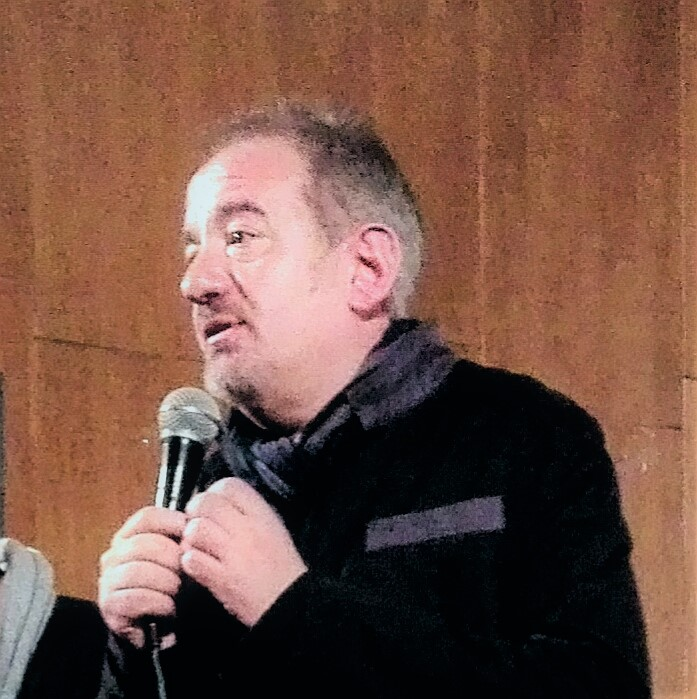
Stephan Komandarev, Best Director award for Blaga's Lessons

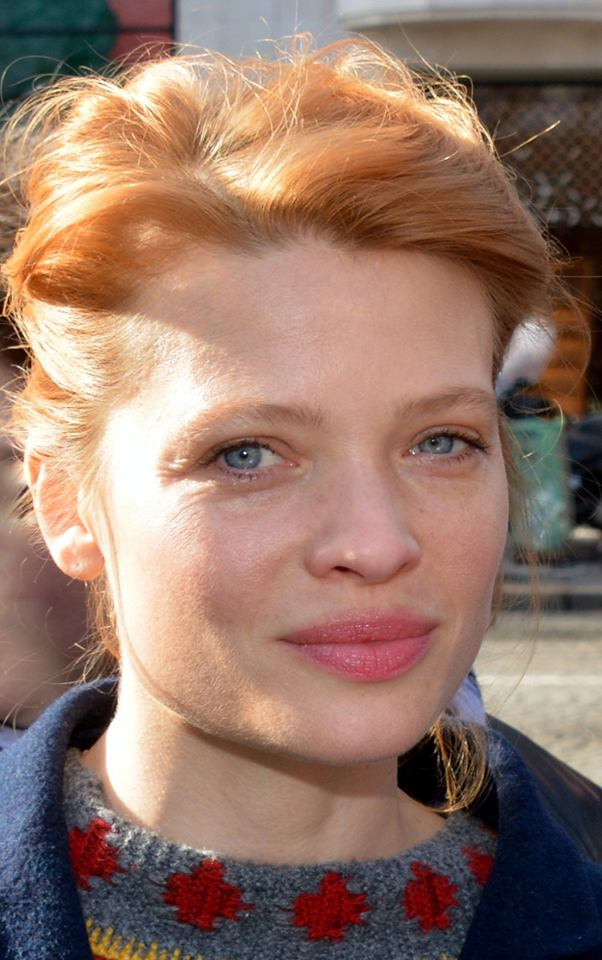
Best Actress: Mélanie Thierry for Party of Fools

Image	Recipient	Country	Ref.
Satyajit Ray Lifetime Achievement Award
	Michael Douglas	United States	
Special Recognition for Contribution to Bharatiya Cinema Award
	Madhuri Dixit	India	

Winner(s)	Work/ director	Ref.
Golden Peacock (Best Film)
Endless Borders	Abbas Amini	
Best Director
Stephan Komandarev	Blaga's Lessons	
Best Actor
Pouria Rahimi Sam	Endless Borders	
Best Actress
Mélanie Thierry	Party of Fools	
Best Debut Film of a Director
When The Seedlings Grow	Rêger Azad Kaya	
Special Jury Award
Rishab Shetty	Kantara	
ICFT UNESCO Gandhi Medal
Drift	Anthony Chen	
Best Web Series Award
Panchayat Season 2	Deepak Kumar Mishra	

== See also ==
- List of film festivals in India
- 52nd International Film Festival of India
