= Chennai International Film Festival =

Annual film festival

- Event logo
- Location: Chennai, Tamil Nadu, India
- Founded: 2002
- Most recent: 2025
- Language: International
- Website: https://chennaifilmfest.com

Current: 23rd
- 24th 22nd

The Chennai International Film Festival (CIFF) is a festival organised in the city of Chennai, India, by a film society, the Indo Cine Appreciation Foundation (ICAF), with the support of The Government of Tamil Nadu, the South Indian Film Chamber of Commerce and the Film Federation of India.

From the official website, the festival aims at:

providing a common platform for the film fraternity to show its expression through films; understanding other cultures and project the excellence of this art form; contribute to the understanding and appreciation of film cultures of the different nations in the context of the social and cultural ethos; and promote friendship and co-operation among peoples of the world.

The festival has been organised since 2002. It showcases international as well as Indian feature films. The Indian language films are divided into the Tamil (12 films) and the Indian panorama featured films (around 12 films). The festival screens more than 100 international feature films.

The CIFF provide awards in the following categories:

- The Best film in Tamil.
- The Second Best film.
- Special Jury Award for individual excellence
- Online Film buff Award
- Amitabh Bachchan Youth Icon Award, from 2013

== 2023 ==
The movie Melody, a film by Behrouz Sebt Rasoul was selected in the 21st Chennai Film Festival and was screened on December 14–21. Melody was selected as the Tajik entry for the Best International Feature Film at the 96th Academy Awards.

== Winners ==
=== 13th CIFF (2015) ===
Category	Winner	Notes
Best film	Kirumi directed by Anucharan	Cash Award Of ₹2 Lakhs
Second Best film	Radiopetti directed by Hari Viswanath	Cash Award Of ₹1 Lakh
Special Jury Award (Actor)	R.Lakshmanan for Radiopetti	Cash Award Of ₹1 Lakh
Director K.Balachander Award	Nayanthara & Arvind Swami	Cash Award Of ₹50,000 each
Amitabh Bachchan Award For Youth Icon	Nayanthara	Cash Award Of ₹1 Lakh
Short film by students of Adyar Film Institute
AMMA Award	Mohan Kumar for BURRAA	Cash Award Of ₹10,000
Film Buff	N.Vignarajan	Gift Pocket

=== 8th CIFF (2010) ===
Category	Winner	Notes
Best film	Angadi Theru directed by Vasanthabalan and executive producer Vijayakumar	Cash Award of ₹1 lakh each
Second Best film	Kalavani directed by A. Sarkunam and producer Nazir	Cash Award of ₹75,000 each
Special Jury Award (Actor)	R. Parthiban for Aayirathil Oruvan	Cash Award of ₹1 Lakh
Best Director	Prabhu Solomon for Mynaa	Cash Award of ₹50,000
Special Award (Best Tamil Independent Film)	Orr Eravuu directors Hari Shankar, Harish Narayan, Krishna Shekar and producer Hari Shankar	Cash Award of ₹50,000
Film Buff	Varun Kumar	Gift Pocket
