= Fajr International Film Festival =

Annual film festival held in Tehran, Iran

- Fajr Film Festival logo
- Location: Tehran, Iran
- Founded: February 1, 1983
- Awards: Crystal Simorgh; Golden Tablet; Diploma Honorary
- Festival date: 1–11 February
- Language: Persian; English
- Website: www.fajriff.com/en/

Iran's annual Fajr International Film Festival (Persian: جشنواره بین‌المللی فیلم فجر), or Fajr Film Festival (little: FIFF; Persian: جشنواره فیلم فجر), has been held every February in Tehran since 1983. The festival is supervised by the Ministry of Culture and Islamic Guidance. It takes place on the anniversary of the 1979 Islamic Revolution. The awards are the Iranian equivalent to the American Academy Awards.

The festival has been promoted locally and internationally through television, radio and webinars; speakers have come from the United States, the United Kingdom, and Germany.

Organizations contributing to the event have included the Farabi Cinema Foundation, Iran film foundation, Press TV, HispanTV and Iran's multi-lingual film channel IFilm. From 2015 to 2022, the festival was bifurcated into two festivals, a national festival in February, which was notable for premieres of the most important domestic movies, and an international one, which was held in April.

Since 2022, the national and international segments have been merged again, with the combined festival taking place from 1 to 11 February every year.

The regular host site of the Fajr International Film Festival, was held at Milad Tower.

== Eligibility ==
Entries into the International Competition section must not have premiered in Central Asia, Caucasia or Anatolia (with the exception of the country of origin), or the Middle East to be considered. Films entered into the competitive sections must have completion dates in the years 2019–2020, while Popular Genre Films, and Docs in Focus, and Special Screenings must have completion dates within 2018–2020. Feature films must have a running time of greater than 70 minutes, while short films must not exceed 15 minutes running time. Films cannot be submitted if they have been submitted in a previous edition of the Festival.

== Awards ==
The 38th Fajr International Film Festival offered awards at the Closing Ceremony on April 20, 2020. Awards are given for Iranian films competing in categories outlined in the FIFF Rules and Regulations, which change in monetary amount from year to year.

=== International ===
- Golden Simurgh for Best Film (awarded to the film director) + 800.000.000 Iranian Rial (IRR) Cash Prize (jointly to producer and director)
- Silver Simurgh for Best Director + 400.000.000 IRR Cash Prize
- Silver Simurgh for Best Script + 300.000.000 IRR Cash Prize
- Silver Simurgh for Best Actress
- Silver Simurgh for Best Actor
- In the decision of International Jury, the prize list must not contain joint awards and no film can receive more than two awards.
- Silver Simurgh for Best Short Film + 100.000.000 IRR Cash Prize (awarded to the film director)

=== Eastern Vista Awards ===
Golden Simurgh for Best Feature Film (awarded to the film director) + 600.000.000 IRR Cash Prize (jointly to producer and director) Silver Simurgh for Best Feature Film Director + 300.000.000 IRR Cash Prize Silver Simurgh for Best Feature Film Script + 150.000.000 IRR Cash Prize Silver Simurgh for Special Jury Prize for Outstanding Artistic Contribution in a Feature Film in the categories of camera, editing, music score, costume or scene design Silver Simurgh for Best Short Film + 100.000.000 IRR Cash Prize (awarded to the film director)

=== National Competition ===
- Crystal Simorgh for Best Film
- Crystal Simorgh for Best Director
- Crystal Simorgh for Best Screenplay
- Crystal Simorgh for Best Actor
- Crystal Simorgh for Best Actress
- Crystal Simorgh for Best Cinematography
- Crystal Simorgh for Best Editor
- Crystal Simorgh for Best Original Score
- Crystal Simorgh for Best Makeup
- Crystal Simorgh for Best Supporting Actor
- Crystal Simorgh for Best Supporting Actress
- Crystal Simorgh for Best Sound Recording
- Crystal Simorgh for Best Sound Effects
- Crystal Simorgh for Best Production Design
- Crystal Simorgh for Best Costume Design
- Crystal Simorgh for Best Special Effects
- Crystal Simorgh for Best Visual Effects
- Crystal Simorgh for Best National Film
- Crystal Simorgh of Special Jury Prize
- Crystal Simorgh for Audience Choice of Best Film

=== Other awards ===
For all:

- Golden Tablet
- Diploma Honorary
- Golden Flag

Single:

- Audience Award
- Golden Banner
- Inter-Faith
- Abbas Kiarostami Award

=== Competitions ===
- Competition of Asian Cinema
- Competition of Spiritual Cinema
- International Competition
- International Competition of Short Films
- International Competition of Documentary Works
- Competition of Iranian Cinema
- Competition of Iranian Short Film
- Competition of Documentary Works

=== Juries ===
- International Competition Jury
- Competition of Spiritual Cinema Jury
- Competition of Asian Cinema Jury

== Record holders ==
• Crystal Simorgh for Best Film: Ebrahim Hatamikia

(Wins: 5)

• Crystal Simorgh for Best Director: Majid Majidi

(Wins: 4)

• Crystal Simorgh for Best Screenplay: Kambuzia Partovi

(Wins: 4)

• Crystal Simorgh for Best Cinematography: Mahmoud Kalari

(Wins: 4)

• Crystal Simorgh for Best Actor: Parviz Parastouei

(Wins: 4)

• Crystal Simorgh for Best Actress: Hedieh Tehrani, Leila Hatami, Baran Kosari, Merila Zarei, Parvaneh Masoumi, Hengameh Ghaziani, Fatemeh Motamed-Arya

(Wins: 2)

== Fajr International Film Festival editions ==
- 1st Fajr International Film Festival (1–11 February 1983)
- 2nd Fajr International Film Festival (1–11 February 1984)
- 3rd Fajr International Film Festival (1–11 February 1985)
- 4th Fajr International Film Festival (1–11 February 1986)
- 5th Fajr International Film Festival (2–12 February 1987)
- 6th Fajr International Film Festival (1–11 February 1988)
- 7th Fajr International Film Festival (1–11 February 1989)
- 8th Fajr International Film Festival (1–11 February 1990)
- 9th Fajr International Film Festival (1–11 February 1991)
- 10th Fajr International Film Festival (1–11 February 1992)
- 11th Fajr International Film Festival (1–11 February 1993)
- 12th Fajr International Film Festival (1–11 February 1994)
- 13th Fajr International Film Festival (1–11 February 1995)
- 14th Fajr International Film Festival (1–11 February 1996)
- 15th Fajr International Film Festival (1–11 February 1997)
- 16th Fajr International Film Festival (1–11 February 1998)
- 17th Fajr International Film Festival (1–11 February 1999)
- 18th Fajr International Film Festival (1–11 February 2000)
- 19th Fajr International Film Festival (1–11 February 2001)
- 20th Fajr International Film Festival (1–11 February 2002)
- 21st Fajr International Film Festival (1–11 February 2003)
- 22nd Fajr International Film Festival (1–11 February 2004)
- 23rd Fajr International Film Festival (1–11 February 2005)
- 24th Fajr International Film Festival (20–30 January 2006)
- 25th Fajr International Film Festival (1–11 February 2007)
- 26th Fajr International Film Festival (1–11 February 2008), For the first time, all the designs and posters of this course were designed by two artists, Miranda Ansari, a graphic designer, and Elham Aiwazi, a university lecturer.
- 27th Fajr International Film Festival (31 January–10 February 2009)
- 28th Fajr International Film Festival (1–11 February 2010)
- 29th Fajr International Film Festival (1–11 February 2011)
- 30th Fajr International Film Festival (1–11 February 2012)
- 31st Fajr International Film Festival (1–11 February 2013)
- 32nd Fajr International Film Festival (1–11 February 2014)
- 33rd Fajr International Film Festival (1–11 February 2015)
- 2016
  - 34th Fajr Film Festival (1–11 February 2016)
  - 34th Fajr International Film Festival (20–25 April 2016)
- 2017
  - 35th Fajr Film Festival (1–11 February 2017)
  - 35th Fajr International Film Festival (21–28 April 2017)
- 2018
  - 36th Fajr Film Festival (1–11 February 2018)
  - 36th Fajr International Film Festival (19–27 April 2018)
- 2019
  - 37th Fajr Film Festival (1–11 February 2019)
  - 37th Fajr International Film Festival (18–26 April 2019)
- 2020
  - 38th Fajr Film Festival (1–11 February 2020)
  - ~~38th Fajr International Film Festival (16–24 April 2020)~~ (Note: 38th Fajr International Film Festival canceled due to the COVID-19 pandemic in Iran.)
- 2021
  - 39th Fajr Film Festival (1–11 February 2021)
  - 38th Fajr International Film Festival (26 May–2 June 2021)
- 2022
  - 40th Fajr Film Festival (1–11 February 2022)
- 41st Fajr International Film Festival (1–11 February 2023)
- 42nd Fajr International Film Festival (1–11 February 2024)
- 2025
  - 43rd Fajr Film Festival (31 January–10 February 2025)
- 2026
  - 44th Fajr Film Festival (1–11 February 2026)

The Melody movie, written, directed, produced and edited by Behrouz Sebt Rasoul, was selected as the Tajik entry for the Best International Feature Film at the 96th Academy Awards, The movie Melody was selected in the 42th Fajr International Film Festival 2024 Iran country.

== Visitors ==
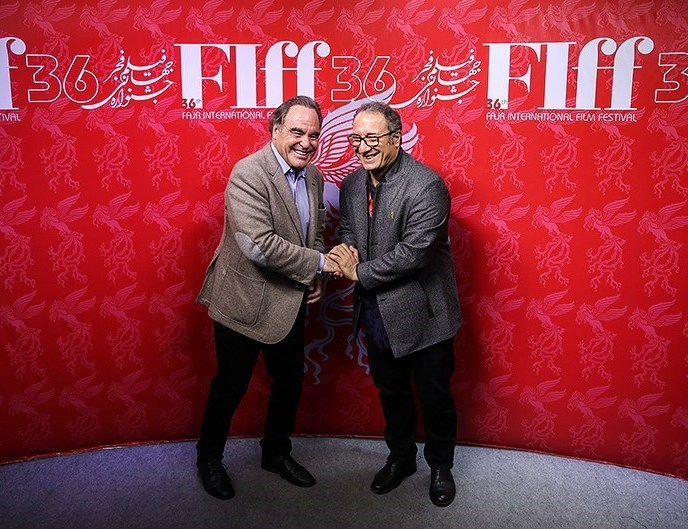
Oliver Stone and Reza Mirkarimi at the 2018 Fajr International Film Festival

Fajr International Film Festival has hosted important figures over the years, including Oliver Stone, Paul Schrader, and Jean-Pierre Léaud.

== Controversies ==
The 2020 edition of the festival faced boycotts from a number of Iranian artists as an effort to show sympathy for the families of those killed in the January 2020 Iranian downing of a Ukrainian passenger flight.

In some years, particularly when there was a coincidence with a tense political situation, the festival has faced boycotting as a state-run event. But some artists have condemned the boycotts including Reza Kianian and Rasoul Sadr Ameli. In one instance, Kianian said, "I believe we should give the people who believe in the festival the freedom to hold it. Some cannot stand their opponents but I have that capacity even when I'm in power."

== Four films introduced to the Academy, at the same time in the international section of Fajr Festival ==
The film Melody by Behrouz Sebt Rasoul, produced in Iran and Tajikistan, as well as the film Domingo and the Mist (Ariel Escalante Meza), the film Punishment by Matías Bize, and the film Farha by Darin J. Salam, four films that were nominated to the Academy for Oscars and at the same time participated in the 42nd Fajr International Film Festival. All four films have successfully made it to the world's prestigious A-Festival before this. The secretary of the festival was Mr. Mojtabi Amini and the manager of the international department was Mr. Raed Faridzadeh.

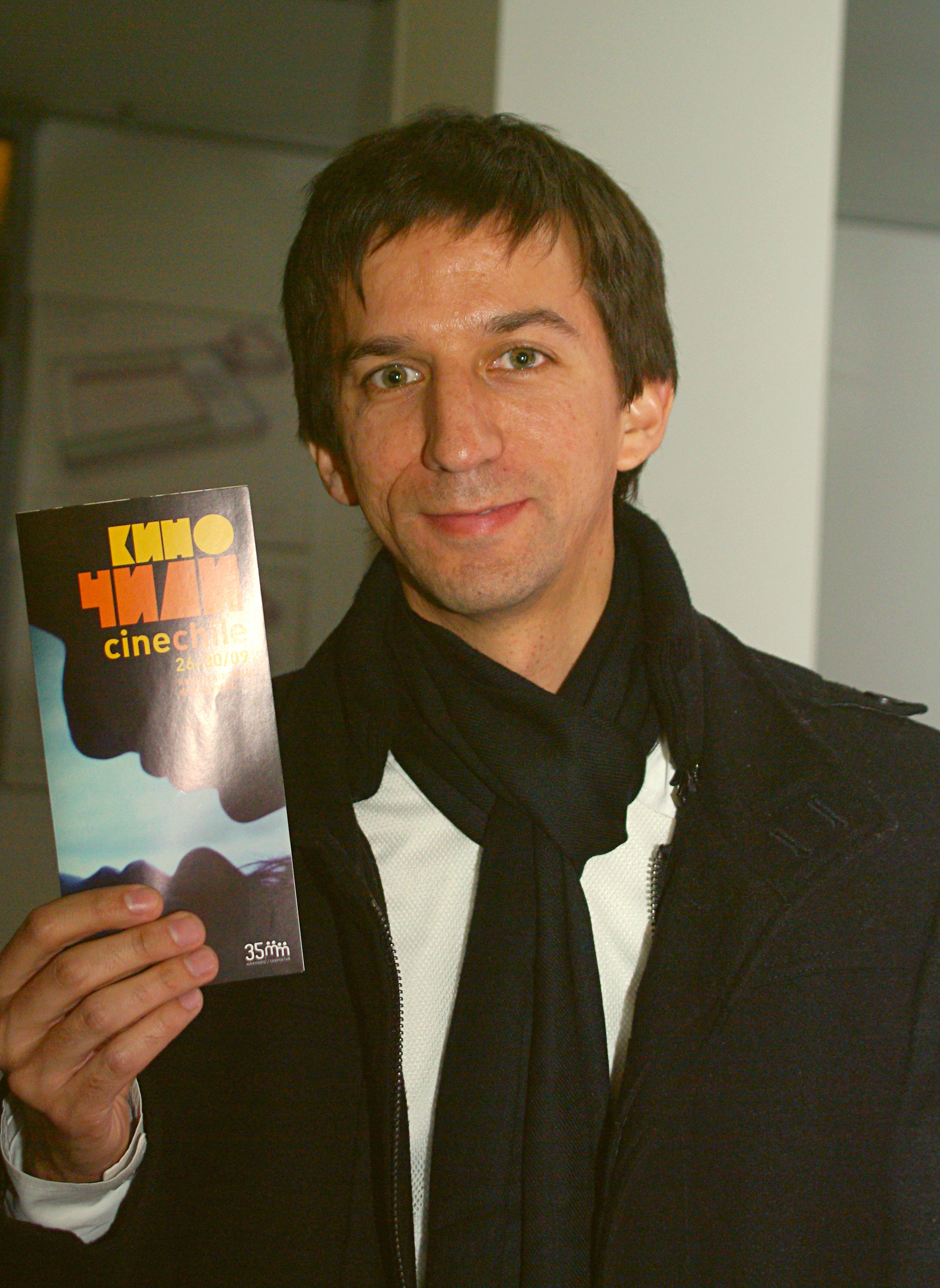

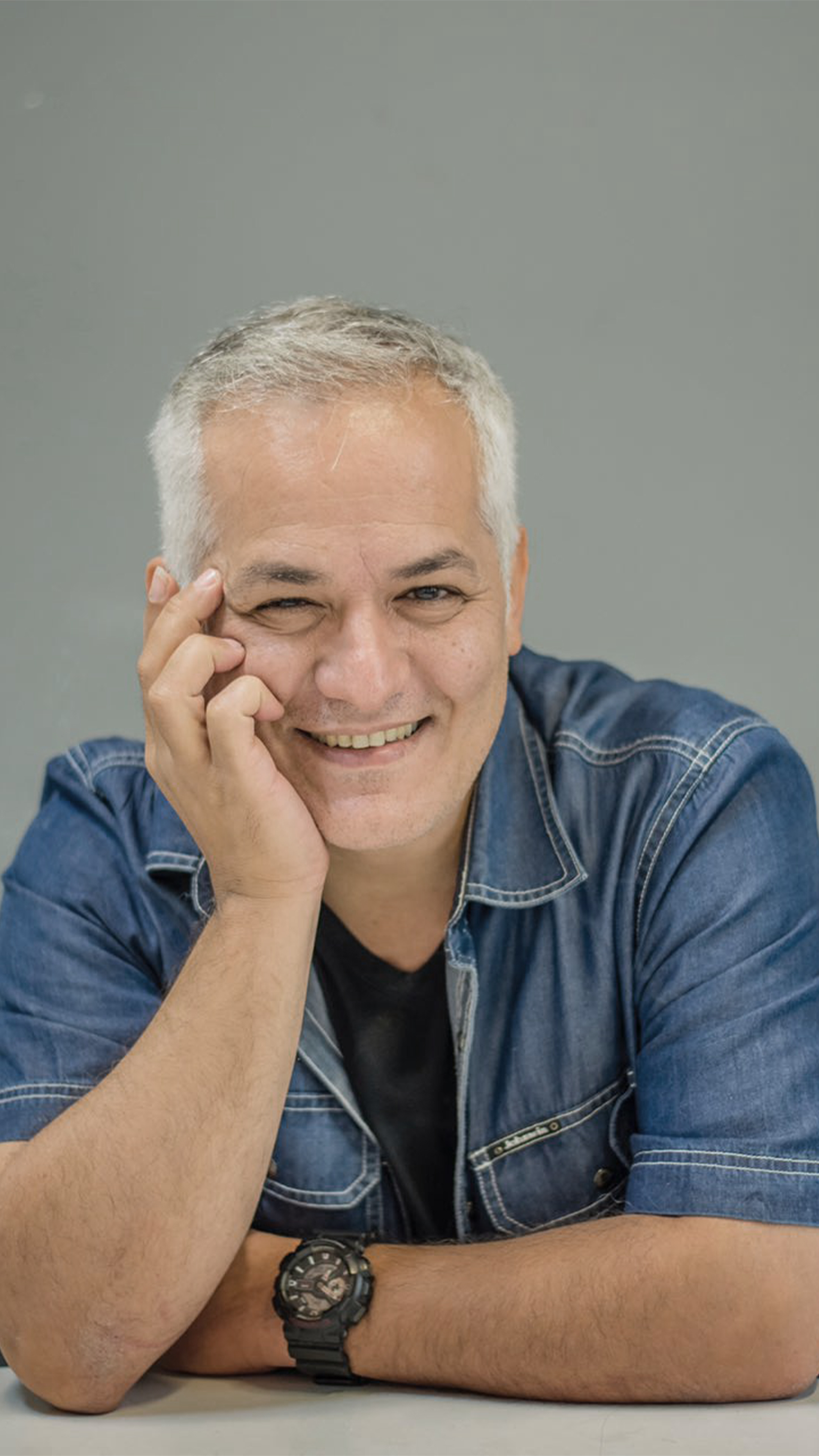

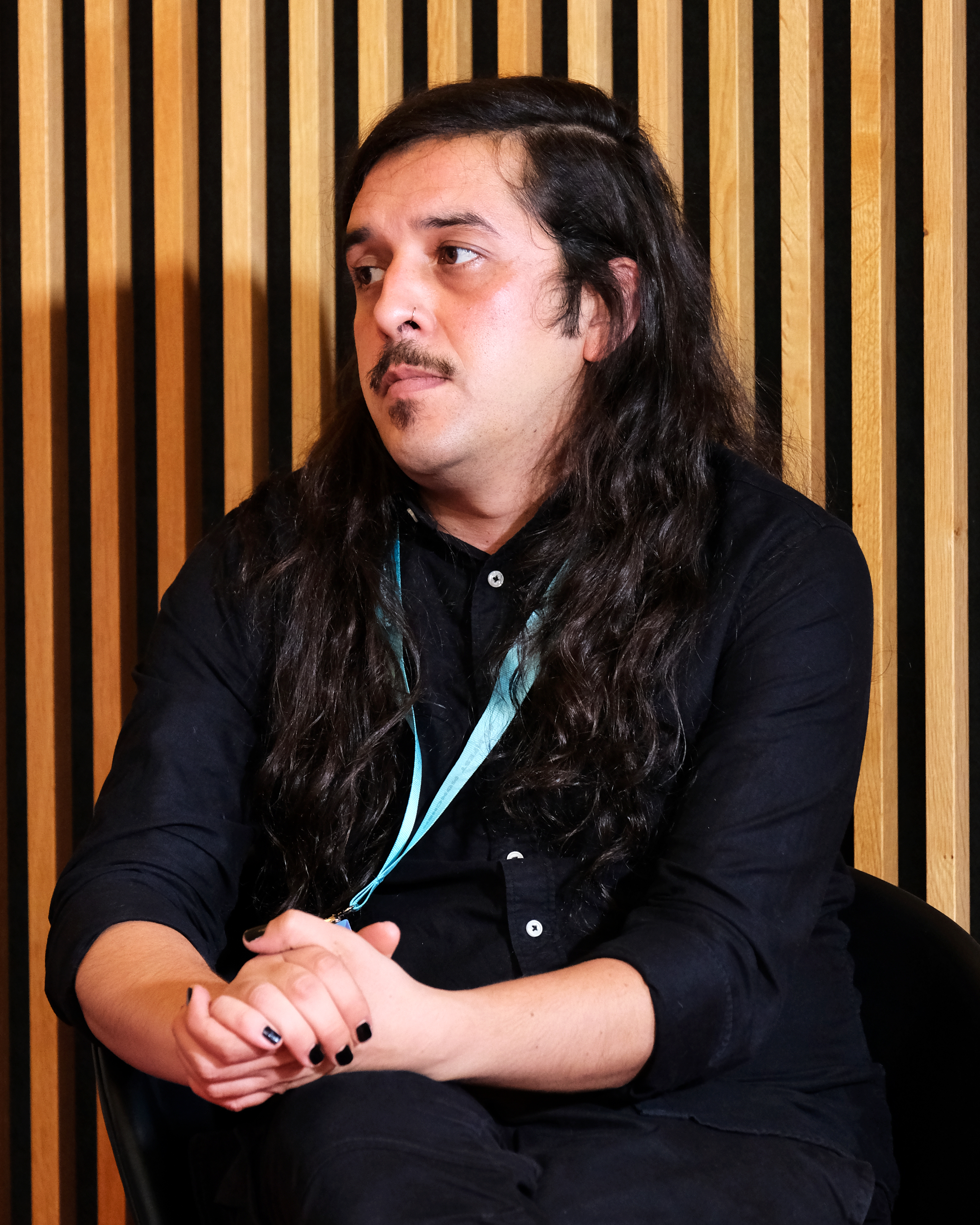

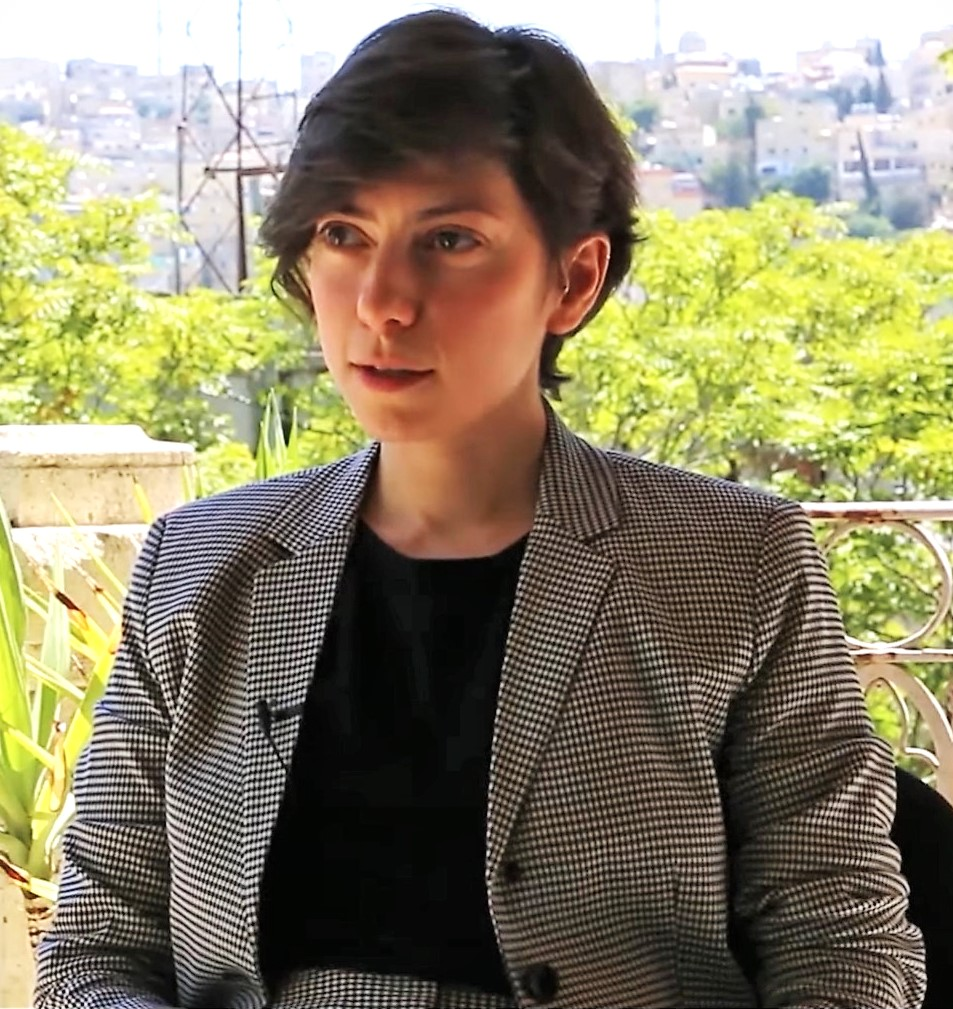

== See also ==
- Fajr decade
- Sobh International Media Festival
- Tehran International Film Festival
