= Camilla Jo-Ann Daries =

Namibian actress

- Citizenship: Namibia
- Occupation: Actor

Camilla Jo-Ann Daries is a Namibian actress. She is known for her roles in Baxu and the Giants (2019), Valara (2022) and Measures of Men (2023).

In 2020, Daries accompanied the Legal Assistance Centre (LAC) to hand over 160 postcards written by learners from the Zambezi and Khomas Region, addressed to President Hage Geingob and First Lady Monica Geingos, at Namibia State House.

== Education ==
She attended her primary school at A.I. Steenkamp Primary School.

== Awards and nominations ==
In 2019, Daries was nominated in the Namibia Film and Theater Awards in the Female Actor category, for her role in Baxu and the Giants.

She was awarded for her work at the 2020 Waka Kids Choice Awards.
