= Without Permission =

Without Permission may refer to:

- Without Permission (2012 film), an Iranian drama film
- Without Permission (2025 film), an Iranian–Scottish drama film
