= The White Line (2019 film) =

2021 Namibian drama film

- Directed by: Desiree Kahikopo-Meiffret
- Written by: Micheal Pulse
- Story by: Desiree Kahikopo-Meiffret
- Produced by: Desiree Kahikopo-Meiffret; Fetteroff Colen; Girley Jazamam; Prudence Kolong; Micheal Pulse
- Starring: Girley Jazama; Jan-Baren Scheepers; Sunet Van Wyk; Muhindua Kaura; Mervin Uahupirapi
- Cinematography: Renier de Bruyn; Laurent Hesemans
- Edited by: Renier de Bruyn
- Music by: Ponti Dikuua
- Release dates: 22 July 2019 (Durban); 13 November 2020 (Namibia)
- Running time: 100 minutes
- Country: Namibia
- Languages: Afrikaans, Otjiherero

The White Line is a 2019 Namibian drama romantic history film directed by Desiree Kahikopo-Meiffret and co-produced by the director herself along with Fetteroff Colen, Girley Jazamam, Prudence Kolong, and Michael Pulse. The film stars Girley Jazama and Jan-Baren Scheepers in lead roles, whereas Sunet Van Wyk, Muhindua Kaura, and Mervin Uahupirapi played supportive roles. The film revolves around a love affair between a Black maid and a White Afrikaner Police officer in 1963 after the Old Location uprising.

The film has been shot in Karibib, Usakos, and Okahandja in central Namibia.It had its first festival premiere at the 2019 Durban International Film Festival. The film received positive acclaim from critics and was screened worldwide. In 2019, at the Namibian Theatre and Film Awards, lead actress Girley Jazama was nominated for the Best Female Actor award. In 2020, the film was nominated for five awards: Best Actress in a Leading Role, Best First Feature by a Director, Best Achievement in Costume Design, Best Screenplay, and Best Film in an African Language at the African Movie Academy Awards. In the same year, the film won the Kilimandjaro Award for the Best Film at the Festival Africlap.

== Cast ==
- Girley Jazama as Sylvia Kamutjemo
- Jan-Baren Scheepers as Pieter de Wit
- Sunet Van Wyk as Anna-Marie van der Merwe
- Muhindua Kaura as Godfried Snr Kamutjemo
- Mervin Uahupirapi as Unotjari Kamutjemo
- Charl Botha as Jan van der Merwe
- Joalette de Villiers as Sunet de Kock
- Vanessa Kamatoto as Jacobine Kamutjemo
- Desmond Katamila as Godfried Jnr Kamutjemo
- Hazel Hinda as Older Sylvia
