= Sira (film) =

2023 drama film by Apolline Traoré

- Promotional release poster
- Directed by: Apolline Traoré
- Written by: Apolline Traoré
- Produced by: Apolline Traoré; Denis Cougnaud
- Starring: Nafissatou Cissé; Mike Danon; Lazare Minoungou; Nathalie Vairac
- Cinematography: Nicolas Berteyac
- Edited by: Sylvie Gadmer
- Music by: Cyril Morin
- Production companies: Araucania Films; Les Films Selmon; One Fine Day Films; Sunuy Films; Canal+
- Distributed by: Wide International Sales & Distribution
- Release date: February 21, 2023 (Berlinale)
- Running time: 122 minutes
- Countries: Burkina Faso; France; Germany; Senegal
- Languages: French; Fula

Sira is a 2023 drama film written and directed by Apolline Traoré and starring Nafissatou Cissé, Mike Danon, Lazare Minoungou, Nathalie Vairac and Ruth Werner. The film depicts the story of young nomad named Sira, who after a brutal attack refuses to surrender to her fate without a fight and instead takes a stand against terror. It is a co-production between Burkina Faso, Senegal, France and Germany.

It had its world premiere on 21 February 2023 at the 73rd Berlin International Film Festival, where it won the Panorama Audience Award for Best Feature Film. It was selected as the Burkinabé entry in the Best International Feature Film category for the 96th Academy Awards. Burkina Faso submitted a film for the first time since 1989. On December 7, it appeared in the eligible list for consideration for the 2024 Oscars, but it didn't make it to the shortlist.

== Synopsis ==
The film set in the Sahel tells the story of a young Fulani girl, Sira, travelling to meet her groom, Jean-Sidi. Suddenly she and her family are attacked by terrorists. All the men are shot and the leader of the gang, Yéré, takes Sira and rapes her. Left for dead in the desert, Sira finds herself alone and takes refuge in a cave as she weaves her survival plan.

== Cast ==
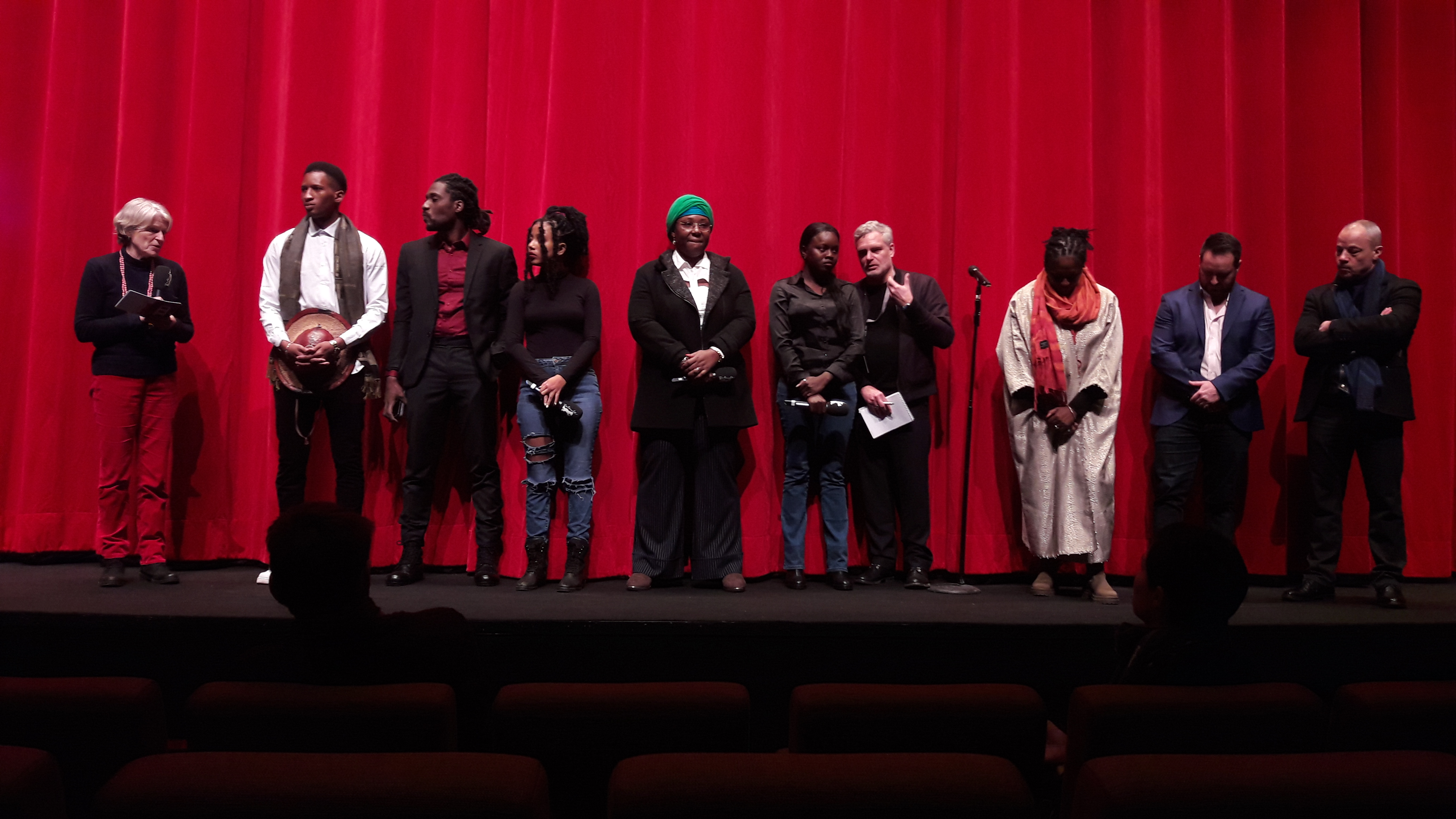
Cast and crew of Sira at Berlinale

- Nafissatou Cissé as Sira
- Mike Danon as Moustapha
- Lazare Minoungou as Yere
- Nathalie Vairac as Aissatou
- Ruth Werner as Kemi
- Abdramane Barry as Jean Sidi
- Ildevert Meda as Karim
- Oumou Ba as Djamila
- Seydou Diallo as Tidiane
- Moïse Tiemtore as Faysal

== Production ==
The film received grant from World Cinema Fund (WCF Africa Program) of €39,000 in November 2021.

The lead actor, Nafissatou Cissé, was selected out of more than 1,000 girls who auditioned. It was filmed in Mauritania, Northwest Africa.

== Release ==
Sira had its premiere on 21 February 2023, as part of the 73rd Berlin International Film Festival, in Panorama. It is also invited at the 2023 Panafrican Film and Television Festival of Ouagadougou, in competition held from 25 February 2023 to 4 March. It opened the 44th Durban International Film Festival on 20 July 2023. It was selected at the 54th International Film Festival of India competing for ICFT UNESCO Gandhi Medal, and was first screened on 23 November 2023. It was showcased at the 39th Santa Barbara International Film Festival in 'Non Premiere Feature Films' section in February 2024.

On 14 February 2023, it was reported that Paris-based sales company Wide has acquired worldwide rights of the film.

It will compete in the International Competition at 39th Mons International Film Festival held from 8 to 16 March 2024.

== Reception ==
Vladan Petkovic reviewing for Cineuropa praised Nafissatou Cissé writing, "It is Cissé who grabs the audience with her all-out performance, making the film more poignant than a simple rape-revenge set-up." Petkovic appreciated the director Apolline Traoré and Cinematographer Nicolas Berteyac's "complex choreography of numerous characters, animals and vehicles that populate the wide shots". He praised editor Sylvie Gadmer, who he opined, "deftly combines them [shots] with intense close-ups," and composer Cyril Morin, for "mostly well-distributed score". For the film Petkovic opined,"Traoré has devised the story in a way that is both clever and honest", which is set in an exotic location "with a fierce African woman as a protagonist who fights back against all odds". He added, all that makes it a "rare African audience-friendly film to break out internationally."

== Accolades ==
Award	Date	Category	Recipient	Result	Ref.
Berlin International Film Festival	25 February 2023	Panorama Audience Award for Best Feature Film	Sira	Won	
Amnesty International Film Awards	25 February 2023	Berlinale's Amnesty Film Prize	Sira	Nominated	
FESPACO	28th FESPACO (2023)	Étalon d'argent de Yennenga	Sira	Won	
World Cinema Amsterdam	28 August 2023	World Cinema Exchange Award 2023	Sira	Won	
International Film Festival of India	28 November 2023	IFFI ICFT UNESCO Gandhi Medal	Sira	Nominated	

== See also ==
- List of submissions to the 96th Academy Awards for Best International Feature Film
- List of Burkinabé submissions for the Academy Award for Best International Feature Film
