= Once Upon a Time in the Andes =

- Theatrical release poster
- Directed by: Rómulo Sulca
- Screenplay by: Rómulo Sulca
- Based on: La Guerra de la Cruz del Sur by Alberto Chavarría Muñoz
- Produced by: Rómulo Sulca; Jhon Pizarro
- Starring: Maribel Baldeón; Juan Cano
- Cinematography: Sara Brusciano
- Edited by: Maricet Sancristóbal
- Music by: Karin Zielinski
- Production company: Catacresis Cine
- Distributed by: V&R Films
- Release dates: November 27, 2023 (IFFI); September 5, 2024 (Peru)
- Running time: 86 minutes
- Country: Peru
- Languages: Quechua; Spanish

Once Upon a Time in the Andes (Spanish: Érase una vez en los Andes) is a 2023 Peruvian war romantic drama film directed, written and co-produced by Rómulo Sulca. Based on the short story La Guerra de la Cruz del Sur by Alberto Chavarría Muñoz, the film stars Maribel Baldeón and Juan Cano. It is a love story between a peasant woman from the central Andes of Peru with a Chilean soldier during the War of the Pacific.

== Synopsis ==
Lautaro, a Chilean soldier, is surprised with his troops in the campaign in the central mountains of Peru, badly injured and being the only survivor of the War of the Pacific, he is revived by Margarita, a local woman who was herding her cattle in the surroundings. There will begin a love story despite language and cultural barriers.

== Cast ==
- Maribel Baldeón as Margarita
- Juan Cano as Lautaro
- Agustina Alarcón
- Felix Poma
- Beto Pomacanchari
- Moises Quichua

== Production ==
Principal photography began on June 14, 2021, and ended on July 12 of the same year in Sarhua, Ayacucho.

== Release ==
Once Upon a Time in the Andes had its world premiere on November 27, 2023, at the 54th International Film Festival of India then was screened on February 8, 2024, at the Ibero American Film Festival Miami. It was commercially released on September 5, 2024, in Peruvian theaters.
