= Durban International Film Festival =

Annual film festival held in Durban, South Africa

Coordinates: 29°53′S 31°03′E

- DIFF2012 Poster
- Location: Durban, South Africa
- Founded: 1979
- Founded by: Teddy Sarkin, Ros Sarkin
- Most recent: 2025
- No. of films: 171 in 2012 edition
- Website: ccadiff.ukzn.ac.za

The Durban International Film Festival (DIFF) is an annual film festival that takes place in Durban, KwaZulu-Natal province, South Africa. It was founded in 1979 by Teddy Sarkin and Ros Sarkin. Presented by Centre for Creative Arts at the University of Kwazulu-Natal, it is the oldest and largest film festival in Africa and presents over 200 screenings celebrating the best in South African, African and international cinema. Most of the screenings are either African or South African premieres. The festival also offers filmmaker workshops, industry seminars, discussion forums, and outreach activities that include screenings in township areas where cinemas are non-existent, and much more, including Talent Campus Durban and a Durban FilmMart co-production market.

Since 2005, DIFF serves as the South African launch for the Wavescape Surf Film Festival.

Talent Campus Durban, in cooperation with the Berlinale Talent Campus, was a new initiative in 2008. and ran its fifth edition in 2012.

Durban FilmMart, a co-production finance forum, launched in 2010. It is run in partnership with the City of Durban's Durban Film Office.

== Awards ==
The festival offers many competition sections and some of the prizes have cash attached. Since 2006, Amnesty International via the Durban Amnesty group, has also sponsored a cash prize called the Amnesty International Durban Human Rights Award.

== Festival editions ==
=== 2023 ===
The 44th edition of the festival was held from 20 to 30 July 2023. It showcased 90 films from 54 countries around the world. Sira, a co-production between Burkina Faso, Senegal, France and Germany by Apolline Traoré, opened the festival on 20 July; whereas Banel & Adama, a French-Malian-Senegalese romantic drama by Ramata-Toulaye Sy, closed the festival on 30 July. Riceboy Sleeps a Canadian drama film by Anthony Shim won the best film award announced on 29 July.

=== 2022 ===
The 43rd edition of the festival was held from 22 July to 1 August 2022. 1960, a South African drama film by King Shaft and Michael Mutombo, opened the festival, whereas You’re My Favourite Place by Jahmil X.T. Qubeka closed the festival.

=== 2024 ===
The 45th edition of the festival was held from 18 July 2024 to 28 July 2024. The festival was organised under programmer Andrea Voges.
