= Measures of Men =

2023 German film

- Promotional poster
- Directed by: Lars Kraume
- Produced by: Thomas Kufus
- Starring: Leonard Scheicher; Girley Charlene Jazama; Peter Simonischek; Ludger Bökelmann
- Cinematography: Jens Harant
- Edited by: Peter R Adam
- Music by: Julian Maas; Christopher M Kaiser
- Production company: Zero one film GmbH (Berlin)
- Distributed by: StudioCanal
- Release dates: 22 February 2023 (Berlinale); 23 March 2023 (Theatres)
- Running time: 116 minutes
- Country: Germany
- Language: German

Measures of Men (German: Der vermessene Mensch – vermessen means measured as well as presumptuous) is a 2023 German drama film directed by Lars Kraume. Starring Leonard Scheicher as an ethnologist, the film tells the story of the Herero and Nama genocide which was perpetrated in German South West Africa (now Namibia) between 1904 and 1908. It had its world premiere on 22nd February 2023 at the 73rd Berlin International Film Festival in Berlinale Special. It was released in cinemas on March 23, 2023. Measures of Men is about Germany’s colonial history and relegates the Nama and Ovaherero.

== Cast ==
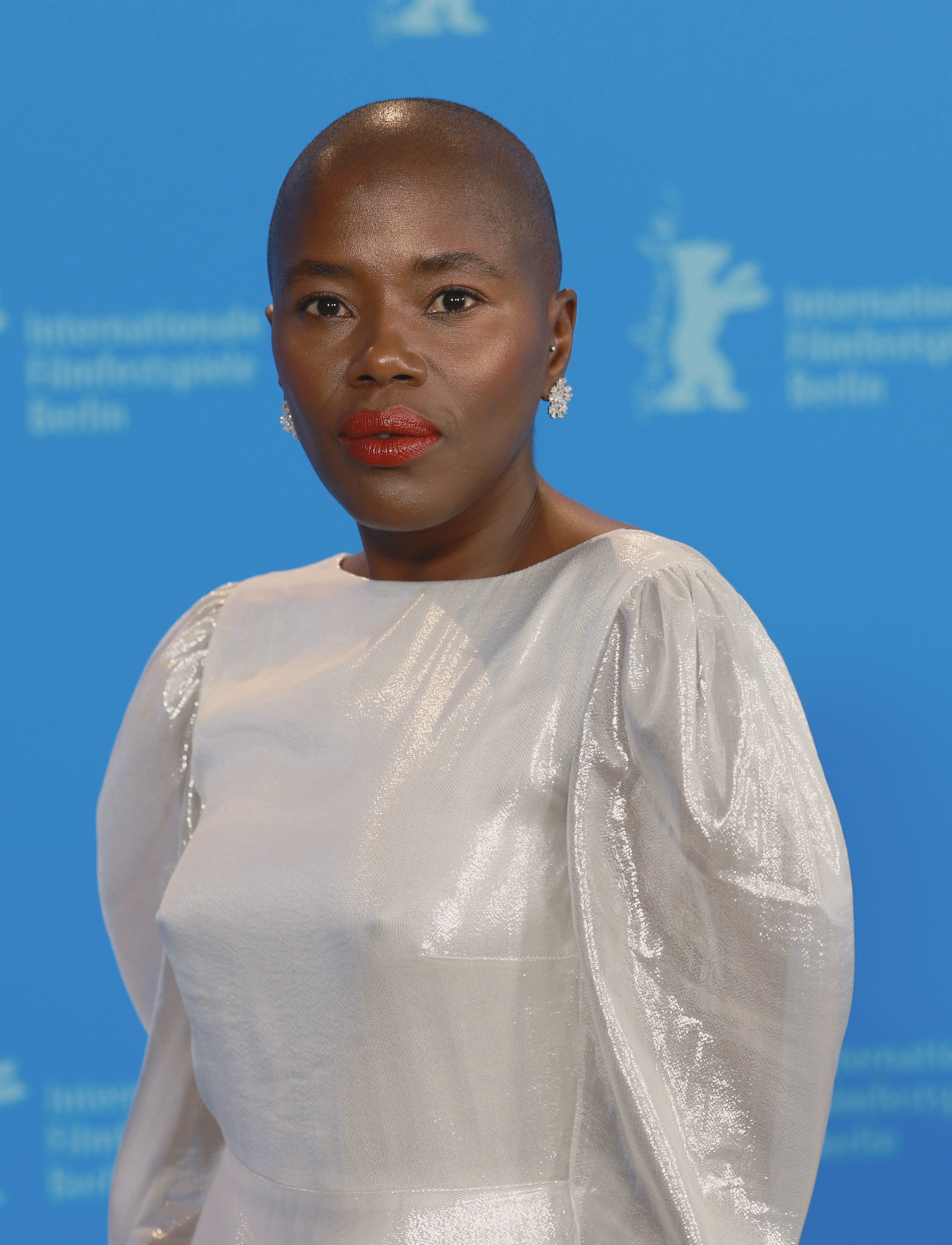
Girley Charlene Jazama in 2023

- Leonard Scheicher as Alexander Hoffmann
- Girley Charlene Jazama as Kezia Kambazembi
- Peter Simonischek as Josef Ritter von Waldstätten
- Ludger Bökelmann as Fähnrich Hartung
- Michael Del Coco as Leichenbeschauer
- Max Philip Koch as Korporal Kramer
- Leo Meier as Bernd Wendenburg
- Sven Schelker as Wolf von Crensky
- Paulus Anton as Friedrich Mahahero
- Petrus Jod as Pveclidias Witbooi

== Production ==
Filming began on 30 August 2021. It was shot in Swakopmund, Namibia and Berlin. On 19 November 2021, the schedule was completed. The movie was granted €3.392.105 of German film funds.

== Release ==
Measures of Men had its premiere on 22 February 2023 as part of the 73rd Berlin International Film Festival, in Berlinale Special. It was released in cinemas on March 23, 2023. The film was invited to the 2023 Vancouver International Film Festival in 'Panorama' section and was screened on 6 October 2023.

The film competed at the 54th International Film Festival of India for Golden Peacock award. It was screened on 22 and 23 November 2023.

== Reception ==
Lida Bach of movie break rated the film 6.5 stars out of 10, praised the performances of Girley Charlene Jazama and Leonard Scheicher and found the production "solidly crafted". Concluding Bach wrote, "Lars Kraume's glossy history lesson reduplicates the racist objectification that it begins to criticize." Bach opined that "the focus was not on historical crimes but on the character case of a 'good colonialist' whose moral dilemma suggests ambivalence where there is none." She criticised the fact that the genocide was used for pleasing entertainment, which said more about the colonialist mentality than the story. Susanne Gottlieb reviewing for Cineuropa wrote that director Kraume showed, that the film was not the story of a hero, a man changed and willing to fight the status quo; rather it was the story of how certain horrors of the mid-20th century found a fertile breeding ground despite people’s conscience." In the 1990s, Kraume was unaware of one of the darkest chapters in German history: the massacre of tens of thousands of Herero and Nama people by officials and soldiers of the German colonial empire in present-day Namibia between 1904 and 1908. This atrocity, now widely recognized as the first genocide of the twentieth century, targeted the Herero (now often referred to as the Ovaherero) and Nama. However, it wasn't until 2021 that Germany officially acknowledged these colonial crimes as genocide.

=== Awards and nominations ===
Awards and nominations for Measures of Men
Award	Date of ceremony	Category	Recipient(s)	Result	Ref.
International Film Festival of India	28 November 2023	IFFI Best Film Award	Measures of Men	Nominated	
