= Baxu and the Giants =

2019 Namibian short film

- Directed by: Florian Schott
- Screenplay by: Girley Jazama; Florian Schott
- Based on: poaching
- Produced by: Andrew Botelle
- Starring: Steven Afrikaner; Camilla Jo-Ann Daries
- Cinematography: Kit Hoffmann
- Edited by: Robert Scott
- Release date: 14 September 2019
- Running time: 29 minutes
- Country: Namibia
- Languages: English; Afrikaans Khoekhoe gowab

Baxu and the Giants is a 2019 Namibian bilingual drama short film written and directed by Florian Schott. The film stars Steven Afrikaner and Camilla Jo-Ann Daries in the lead roles. The theme of the film is based on poaching in modern rural Namibia. The film was released on 14 September 2019. Prior to the release of the film, it was regarded as one of the most anticipated Namibian films of 2019. It received critical acclaim from the critics for its editing and cinematography. The film was also premiered in few international film festivals. The portions of the film were shot in Tubuses and in Erongo Region. The film has won several awards and nominations in international film festivals. It was also released on Netflix and became the first Namibian short film ever to be released on Netflix. It was revealed that Netflix deal was initiated in March 2020 with the support and assistance of a South African sales agent when the film was premiered at the 2020 RapidLion International Film Festival.

== Cast ==
- Steven Afrikaner as main hunter
- Camilla Jo-Ann Daries as Baxu
- Robert Hara Gaeb as neighbour
- Anna Louw as Ouma
- Ashwyn Mberi as King Rhino
- Wafeeq Narimah as Khata
- West Uarije as Himba Tracker

== Synopsis ==
A story of how rhino poaching triggers social change in rural Namibia, seen through the eyes of a 9 year old girl.

== Production ==
The film was commissioned by the Legal Assistance Centre with the aim of sensitising youngsters and teenagers on the issue of rhino poaching. The film was made with the intention of making awareness against rhino poaching and was also made for the purpose of donations to the Save the Rhino organisation in Namibia.

== Release ==
The film had its release in September 2019 before being officially selected for film premiere in various international film festivals. The film had its first public screening in Namibia on 6 February 2020 at the DHPS Auditorium for free of charge. The filmmakers announced that the film would be globally released from 20 March 2020 for free in their official website baxuandthegiants.com. It was meant that the film could be downloaded by the public from the website for free.

== Awards and nominations ==
10 year old child actress Camilla Jo-Ann Daries was highly praised for her performance as a 9 year old teenager in the film and bagged the Best Actress award at the 2019 Namibian Theatre and Film Awards. She became the youngest Namibian actress to receive the relevant award.

Year	Award	Category	Result
2019	San Francisco Independent Short Film Festival	Best Foreign Narrative	Won
2019	Canadian Cinematography Awards	Best cinematographer - Kit Hoffmann	Won
2019	European Cinematography Awards	Best cinematographer - Kit Hoffmann	Won
2019	Namibian Theatre and Film Awards	Best Actress - Camilla Jo-Ann Daries	Won
2019	Namibian Theatre and Film Awards	Best Editing - Robert Scott	Won
2019	Namibian Theatre and Film Awards	Best Production Design - Tanya Stroh	Won
