= Catching Dust =

2023 film by Stuart Gatt

- Theatrical release poster
- Directed by: Stuart Gatt
- Written by: Stuart Gatt
- Produced by: Mark David; Jon Katz; Edward R. Pressman; Stuart Gatt
- Starring: Erin Moriarty; Dina Shihabi; Jai Courtney; Ryan Corr
- Cinematography: Aurélien Marra
- Edited by: Nicolas Gaster
- Music by: Danny Mulhern
- Production companies: Civilian 7 Entertainment; Edward R. Pressman Film; Cuernos Productiones S.L.; 6th International Films; Volcano Films
- Distributed by: Vertical (United States); Alarm Pictures (United Kingdom)
- Release dates: June 11, 2023 (Tribeca Festival); August 22, 2024 (United States)
- Running time: 101 minutes
- Countries: United Kingdom; United States; Spain
- Language: English

Catching Dust is a 2023 drama film directed by Stuart Gatt in his debut feature, starring Erin Moriarty, Dina Shihabi, Jai Courtney and Ryan Corr. The film is about Geena (Erin Moriarty), who decides to leave her criminal husband, Clyde (Jai Courtney), and their isolated Texas hideout when a couple from New York arrives in search of respite from the city. The film had its premier at the Tribeca Festival on 11 June 2023.

== Synopsis ==
Geena and her outlaw spouse Clyde, have taken refuge in a solitary trailer on a deserted community in Texas’ Big Bend. Tired of his autocratic ways, Geena plans to escape, when a new trailer shows up with a pair from New York. Geena persuades Clyde to let them stay, despite the dangers they will bring, a choice that leads to serious trouble for everyone.

== Cast ==
- Erin Moriarty as Geena
- Jai Courtney as Clyde
- Dina Shihabi as Amaya
- Ryan Corr as Andy

== Production ==
The film set in West Texas was filmed in Fuerteventura in the Canary Islands on 35mm film.

== Release ==
Catching Dust was selected at the Raindance Film Festival, held from 23 October to 4 November, where it was nominated for best UK feature. The film opened the 54th International Film Festival of India on 20 November 2023. The film was released in select theaters and on video on demand on August 22, 2024.

== Reception ==
On the review aggregator Rotten Tomatoes website, the film has an approval rating of 71% based on 14 reviews, with an average rating of 6.3/10.

Mae Abdulbaki reviewing for Screen Rant rated the film 3/5 and wrote, "It builds suspense & creates intriguing character dynamics, even though its focus gets too caught up in the climactic ending more than anything else."
