= Borders (2017 film) =

- Directed by: Apolline Traoré
- Screenplay by: Apolline Traoré
- Produced by: Denis Cougnaud
- Starring: Amelie Mbaye - Hadjara Kany Sy Savané - Emma Unwana Udobang - Micha Adizetou Sidi - Sali
- Release date: 26 February 2017
- Countries: Burkina Faso; France

Borders (French: Frontières) is a 2017 drama film co-produced between Burkina Faso and France, directed and written by Apolline Traoré and starring Amelie Mbaye, Naky Sy Savané, Adizetou Sidi, and Unwana Udobang in the lead roles.

== Plot ==
The film tells the stories of four women from different regions who meet on a bus that travels through West Africa and discover that, despite not having any relationship, their lives are pretty similar, as they have had to fight and try to get ahead on their own.

=== Generalities ===
According to its director Apolline Traoré, the entire production team had to make the bus trip that is recounted in the film: "It was necessary to shoot the film along the actual route ... We had to obtain authorizations everywhere and plan the border crossing with the administrations of each country." She also stated that she must have had military assistance to carry out the filming: "Some areas were victims of terrorist attacks, and that is why the army accompanied us. The soldiers knew how to be discreet during the filming; we forgot about them, then we saw them reappear to escort us every time our convoy left.

== Cast ==
- Amelie Mbaye - Hadjara
- Kany Sy Savané - Emma
- Unwana Udobang - Micha
- Adizetou Sidi - Sali

== Reception ==
=== Reviews ===
Borders was on the list of the twenty best African films of all time, published by the British newspaper The Guardian. On the France24 portal, it is recognized as “an opportunity to show several united faces of Africa in a harmonious and chaotic mix at the same time. Apolline Traoré does not stop reproducing the diversity of cultures on the screen. These encounters are not accidental, they are real in everyday life". The director's work was praised in the French magazine Jeune Afrique: "The upward work close to the report and the shooting conditions naturally had an impact on the authenticity of the film, which is sometimes close to the documentary format. As in previous productions of hers, Traoré points her lens at women battered by fate, but who have decided to fight."

=== Awards and recognition ===
The film earned its director the Audience Award at the World Cinema Amsterdam event, held in the Netherlands in 2017. At the Pan-African Film and Television Festival in Ouagadougou the same year, it won the ECOWAS awards, Félix Houphouët-Boigny and Paul Robeson.
