= Melody (2023 film) =

- Promotional release poster
- Directed by: Behrouz Sebt Rasoul
- Written by: Behrouz Sebt Rasoul
- Produced by: Behrouz Sebt Rasoul
- Starring: Diman Zandi alireza ostadi meghdad eslami safar haghdadov zolfie sadikova
- Cinematography: Ali Mohammad Ghasemi
- Edited by: Behrouz Sebt Rasoul
- Music by: Fouad Samiei
- Production companies: NAMA Film; Safina TV
- Distributed by: DreamLabFilms
- Release date: 24 November 2023 (Goa)
- Running time: 85 minutes
- Countries: Tajikistan; Iran
- Language: Tajik Persian

Melody (Persian: ملودی; Tajik: Мелодия, romanized: Melodiya) is a 2023 Tajikistani-Iranian drama film written, directed, produced and edited by Behrouz Sebt Rasoul. The film follows a music teacher, Melody who wants to compose a heartfelt piece for children fighting cancer, using the sound of 30 birds.

The film was twice selected as the Tajikistan entry for the Best International Feature Film, at the 96th and 97th Academy Awards. In 2023, the film did not appear on the final list because it was not submitted on time; one year later the country officially submitted the film again, which was ultimately not nominated.

== Plot ==
At a children's cancer center, Melody teaches music to 30 children. He wants to compose a piece of music using the sounds of 30 different birds. A simple task, but when they only find 20 birds, Melody accompanied by Mango, a mute housekeeper, will embark on an old singer who knows where the rest of the birds that are being hunted are.

== Cast ==
- Diman Zandi as Melody
- Alireza Ostadi as Old Singer
- Meghdad Eslami as Mango
- Safar Hakadodov as Groom's father
- Zulfiya Sadikova as Groom's mother

== Production ==
This is a collaborative effort of the state-owned Tajikistan broadcaster, TV Safina and directors's own film company in Tehran, Nama Film.

== Release ==
The movie was selected to be screened at the 54th International Film Festival of India and had its first international screening in the Cinema of the World section. The film was also selected for the 21st Chennai Film Festival, the 24th Keswick Film Festival competition section, the 42th Fajr International Film Festival, the Competition section in 10th Iranian Film Festival Zurich 2024

the Panorama section of 11th the Silk Road Festival 2024. The film participated in the Competition section in the 23th ImagineIndia Int’l Film Festival, Madrid – Spain and won in three sections and was nominated in two sections.

The film was released in Tajikistan on 25 December 2023. International sales were managed by France's Dreamlab Films.

== See also ==
- List of submissions to the 96th Academy Awards for Best International Feature Film
- List of Tajikistani submissions for the Academy Award for Best International Feature Film
