= IFFI Best Web Series (OTT) Award =

Annual film festival award in India

- Awarded for: Outstanding webseries of a high aesthetic and technical standard and educational and culture value
- Sponsored by: International Film Festival of India
- First award: 2023; 3 years ago
- Final award: 2025
- Most recent winner: Bandish Bandits (Season 2) by Anand Tiwari

Highlights
- Total awarded: 3
- First winner: Panchayat Season 2

The IFFI Best Web Series (OTT) Award (officially known as the Silver Peacock for the Best Web Series) is an honor that has been presented annually at the International Film Festival of India since the 54th IFFI (2023) for the best web series.

== Recipients ==
=== IFFI Best Web Series (OTT) Award (2023 – present) ===
List of Silver Peacock award recipients, showing the year, film(s) and language(s)
Year	Recipient(s)	Work(s)	Language(s)	Ref.
2023 (54th)	Deepak Kumar Mishra	Panchayat Season 2	Hindi	
2024 (55th)	Nipun Dharmadhikari	Lampan	Marathi	
2025 (56th)	Anand Tiwari	Bandish Bandits (Season 2)	Hindi	
