= Girley Jazama =

Namibian actor, screenwriter, film producer

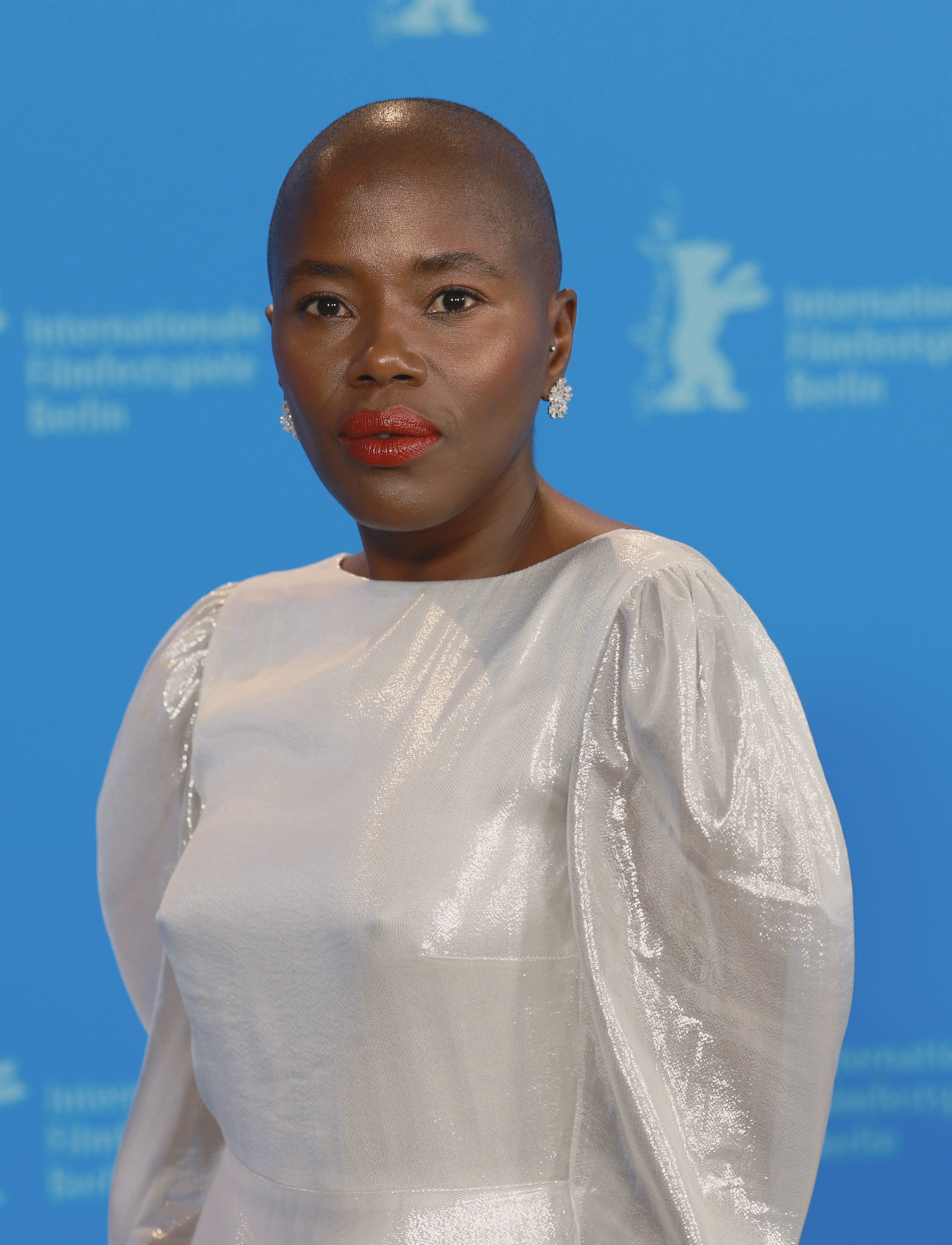
- Jazama at the 2023 Berlin International Film Festival
- Born: Namibia
- Occupation: Actor • film producer • screenwriter
- Years active: since 2005
- Known for: Baxu and the Giants (2019); The White Line (2019)

Girley Charlene Jazama is a Namibian actor, scriptwriter, and film producer. Girley was nominated for the AMAA 2020 award for Best Actress in a Leading Role for her role as Sylvia in The White Line.

== Film ==
Year	Title	Role	Notes
2009	Three and a Half Lives of Philip Wetu	Nailoke	
2010	Cries at Night	Niece	
2012	100 Bucks	Maria	
2016	Underneath the Sky	Sky	Lead Actor
2018	The White Line	Sylvia Kamutjemo	Lead Actor
2020	The Game	Ndanki	Lead Actor
2020	Save The Rhino (promo)	Narrator	
2021	Under The Hanging Tree	Christina Mureti	Lead Actor
2021	Measures of Men	Kezia Kambazembi	Female Lead
TBA	Apart †	TBA	Post-production

== Television ==
Year	Title	Role	Notes
2008	The Ties That Bind	Pretty	
2009	Liebe, Babys und der Zauber Afrikas	Student	
2013	Um Himmels Willen	Schwester Alma	

== Stage ==
Year	Title	Role	Notes
2006	Bewitched Tree	Ndeshi	
2006	Olivia Toyeta	Bubbles	
2007	God of Women		
2007	Everyman	Angel	
2014	Revere Them Those Men	Divine Edison	

== Crew member ==
Year	Title	Position	Notes
2008	The Ties That Bind	Scriptwriter (Episode 12)	Series
2017	More Than Mining	Scriptwriter, Production Manager	Documentary
2018	The White Line	Producer	
2019	Land Rights for the Urban Poor	Director, Scriptwriter	Documentary
2019	Baxu and the Giants	Co-writer, co-producer, Production Manager	Short Film
2020	Watering The Tree	Sound Recordist	Documentary

== Nominations ==
Year	Festival	Title	Nomination	Notes	Result
2014	Namibian Theatre and Film Awards	Revere Them Those Men	Best Supporting Actor	Stage	Nominated
2019	Namibia Theatre and Film Awards	The White Line	Best Narrative Film	Feature Film	Nominated
2019	Namibia Theatre and Film Awards	Baxu and the Giants	Best Narrative Film	Short Film	Nominated
2019	Namibian Theatre and Film Awards	The White Line	Best Female Actor	Feature Film	Nominated
2019	Africa International Film Festival	Baxu and the Giants	International Short Film	Short Film	Nominated
2020	Roxbury International Film Festival	Baxu and the Giants	Best Short Film	Short Film	Nominated
2020	RapidLion Film Festival	Baxu and the Giants	Best Humanitarian Film	Short Film	Nominated
2020	Pan African Film Festival	Baxu and the Giants	Best Narrative Short	Short Film	Nominated
2020	Africa Movie Academy Awards	Baxu and the Giants	Best Short Film	Short Film	Nominated
2020	Africa Movie Academy Awards	The White Line	Best Actor in a Leading Role	Feature Film	Nominated
2020	Africa Movie Academy Awards	The White Line	Best Film in an African Film Language	Feature Film	Nominated

== Awards ==
Year	Festival	Title	Award	Notes	Result
2019	7th African Emerging Filmmakers Awards	The White Line	Best Feature Film	Feature Film	Won
2019	Namibian Theatre and Film Awards	The White Line	Audience Choice	Feature Film	Won
2019	San Francisco Independent Short Film Festival	Baxu and the Giants	Best Foreign Narrative	Short Film	Won
2020	Waka Kids Choice Award	Baxu and the Giants	Top TV show / Program / Movie	Short Film	Won
2020	Luxor African Film Festival	The White Line	Special Jury Mention	Feature Film	Won
2020	AfryKamera African Film Festival	Baxu and the Giants	3rd place, Afroshorts Audience Award	Short Film	Won
2020	7th Africlap Festival	The White Line	The Kilimanjaro Award for Best Feature Film Fiction	Feature Film	Won
2020	Académie des Sotigui	The White Line	Sotigui D’or	Feature Film	Won
2020	Académie des Sotigui	The White Line	Best Southern Africa Actor	Feature Film	Won
2021	Global Indie Film Fest	Baxu and the Giants	Best Long Short Film	Short Film	Won
2021	Garden Route International Film Festival	The White Line	Best Actor in a Leading Role	Feature Film	Won

== In Consideration ==
Year	Awards	Title	Status
2022	79th Golden Globe Awards	The White Line	In Consideration
2022	94th Academy Awards	The White Line	In Consideration
2024	96th Academy Awards	Under The Hanging Tree	In Consideration
