= Without Permission (2025 film) =

2025 Iranian-Scottish film

- Directed by: Hassan Nazer
- Written by: Hassan Nazer
- Produced by: Hassan Nazer
- Starring: Behrouz Sebt Rasoul; Setareh Fakhaari; Mehdi Mehri
- Cinematography: Ali Mohammad Ghasemi
- Edited by: Ali Navaeian; Hassan Nazer
- Music by: Amin Sharifi
- Distributed by: DreamLab Films
- Release date: September 17, 2025 (Busan)
- Running time: 80 minutes
- Countries: Iran; United Kingdom
- Language: Persian

Without Permission is a 2025 Iranian–Scottish drama film directed, written and produced by Hassan Nazer. The film starring Behrouz Sebt Rasoul follows the story of an exiled Iranian filmmaker who, after being denied permission to make his scripted project, turns to children to capture their candid voices and perspectives on love, identity, and freedom. By filming secretly in hidden locations, the narrative evolves into a reflection on self-expression within a world of limitations.

The Iranian–British co-production Without Permission, was selected for the main Competition section of the 30th Busan International Film Festival and had its world premiere on 17 September 2025.

The narrative follows a filmmaker's return to his homeland and his collaboration with children in search of a new expressive language—a poetic and introspective journey emphasizing the power of imagination and the self-expression of younger generations. The film's international distribution is handled by the French company DreamLab Films.

== Plot ==
An exiled Iranian filmmaker returns home after being denied permission for his scripted film. Determined to capture the voices of the new generation and their unfiltered thoughts on love, identity, and freedom, he turns to children, secretly filming in hidden locations. As he navigates societal and political barriers, his journey becomes a powerful exploration of self-expression in a controlled world.

== Production ==
(To be expanded)

== Release ==
Without Permission had its world premiere in the Competition section of the 30th Busan International Film Festival on 17 September 2025.

== Accolades ==
The film competed for various Vision Awards at Busan International Film Festival.

Award	Date of ceremony	Category	Recipient(s)	Result	Ref.
Busan International Film Festival	September 26, 2025	Busan Awards	Without Permission	Nominated	
