= Apolline Traoré =

Burkinabé filmmaker (born 1976)

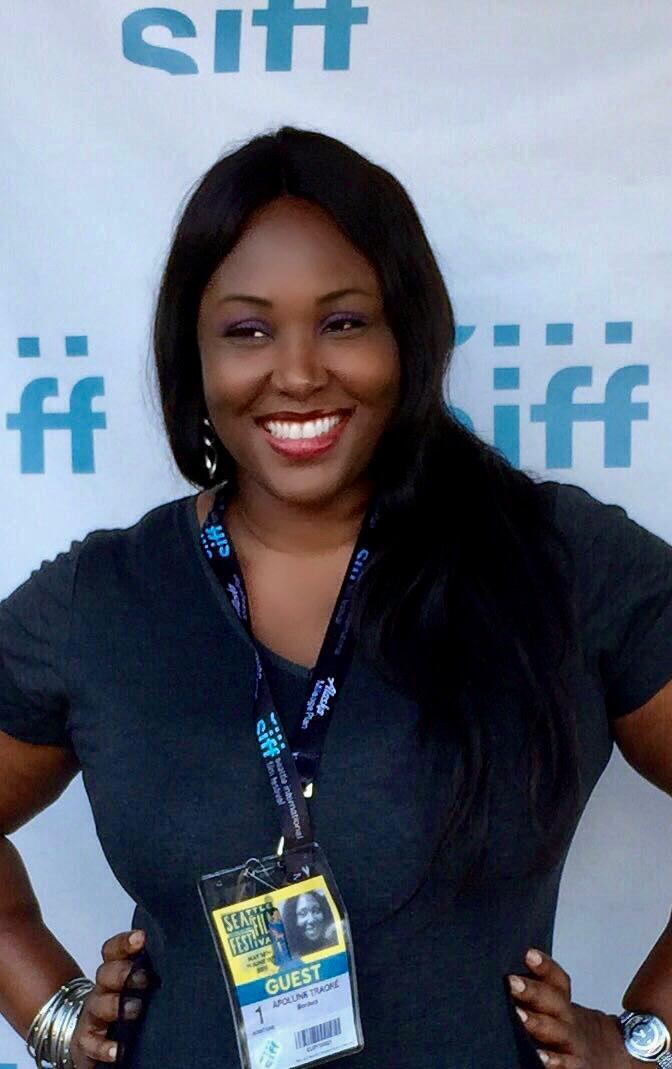
- Born: 1976 (age 49–50); Ouagadougou, Upper Volta
- Citizenship: Burkinabé
- Education: Emerson College
- Occupation: Filmmaker . Producer
- Notable work: Le testament (2008)

Apolline Traoré (born 1976) is a Burkinabé director, screenwriter, and producer. She is known for films that include Sous la clarté de la lune, Borders (Frontières ), Desrances, and Sira, winner of FESPACO's Étalon d'argent de Yennenga in 2023 and Burkina Faso's entry in the Best International Feature Film category for the 96th Academy Awards.

== Early life and education ==
She was born in 1976 in Ouagadougou. From the age of seven, she lived abroad in Africa and Europe given her father's career as a diplomat. After graduating from high school at age 17, she attended Emerson College's School of Arts in Boston in the United States.

== Career ==
Her graduation short film, The Price of Ignorance (2000), won the Jury Prize at the 2001 Pan-African Film and Television Festival, the first of multiple awards Traoré would win over the years at FESPACO. It was on that occasion that she met Idrissa Ouédraogo, one of Burkina Faso's most prominent directors. Ouédraogo would subsequently mentor and collaborate with Traoré and encourage her to return to Burkina Faso. After traveling back and forth between Los Angeles and her home country from 2005 to 2008, she eventually returned to live full-time in Burkina Faso in 2008.

She followed up The Price of Ignorance with the shorts Monia and Rama (2002) and Kounandi (2003). Kounandi, a fable about acceptance and love, was produced by Ouédraogo and screened at the Sundance Film Festival and the Toronto International Film Festival in 2004.

Her first feature film, Sous la clarté de la lune (2004), was co-written with and produced by Ouédraogo under his NDK Productions banner. The film won Best Music at FESPCO in 2005. In 2008, she directed her first television project, the Burkinabe drama series Le testament, another collaboration with Ouédraogo. In 2013 she produced, directed and co-wrote Moi Zaphira a black and white film about a young Burkinabe mother who goes against the traditions of her community to find a better life for her daughter. Traoré explained the use of filming in "cold" black and white as a way of telegraphing the character's unhappiness. The film screened in competition for the Grand Prize at Fespaco that same year.

In 2017 Traoré wrote and directed Borders (Frontières ), a film about a group of women traveling across West Africa who endure corruption and sexual assault. Borders won Best Narrative Film at the 26th Annual Pan African Film Festival, the largest Black film festival in North America as well as two prizes at FESPACO in 2017: the African Integration Award from ECOWAS and the Félix-Houphouët-Boigny Prize.

Traoré reached a new level of acclaim in 2019 with Desrances, her fourth feature film. It screened at FESPACO that year where it received the award for Best Set Design and went on to receive additional African and international prizes including three awards at the International Film Festival of Kerala in India and three awards at Sotigui Awards: Best Youngest African Actor for Nemlin Jemima Naomi, Best Actor in African Cinema in the Diaspora, and the Sotigui d'or which went to the Haitian actor Jimmy Jean-Louis. In Benin, the film won the top prize, the Grand Prix Buste d'or Paulin Soumanou Vieyra in 2019 at the Rencontres cinématographiques et numériques de Cotonou (Recico) film festival.

Her most recent film Sira (2023), about a young Fulani woman who fights against Islamist terrorists after a deadly attack on her caravan in the Sahel, is Traoré's most lauded film to date. It had its world premiere at the 73rd Berlin International Film Festival where it won the Panorama Audience Award for Best Feature Film; was the winner of the Étalon d'argent de Yennenga at FESPACO 2023; and was selected as the Burkinabé entry in the Best International Feature Film category for the 96th Academy Awards—the first time Burkina Faso submitted a film since 1989.

Traoré has received several honors for her contributions to arts and culture and the advancement of women. This includes the Medal for the Fight of Women in Cinema given by the Luxor African Film Festival (2022) and the Chevalier de l'Ordre du Mérite, des Arts, des Lettres et de la Communication of Burkina Faso (2019). In 2020, she was named as an Ambassador of the National Museum of Burkina Faso.

== Filmography ==
- Sira (2023)
- Desrances (2019)
- Borders (Frontières) (2017)
- Moi Zaphira (2013)
- La testament (2008)
- Sous la clarté de la lune (2004)
- Kounandi (2003)
- Monia et Rama (2002)
- The Price of Ignorance (2000)
