= Behrouz Sebt Rasoul =

Iranian filmmaker, screenwriter, editor, photographer, musician and author

- بهروز سبط رسول
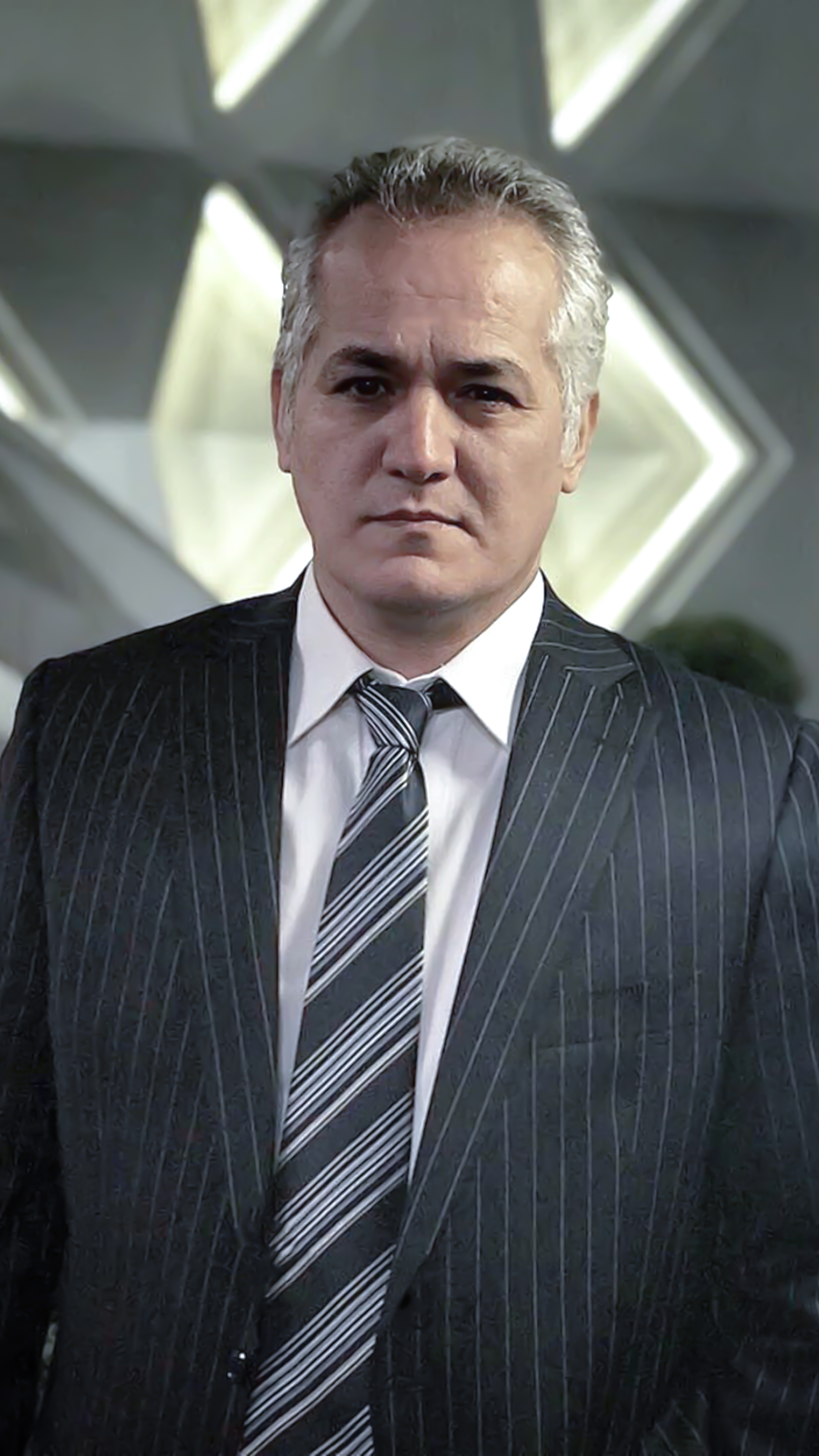
- Born: 7 July 1970 (age 56); Tehran, Imperial State of Iran
- Education: Kharazmi University, Industrial Engineering
- Occupations: Film director; screenwriter; film producer
- Years active: 2009–present
- Website: Official website

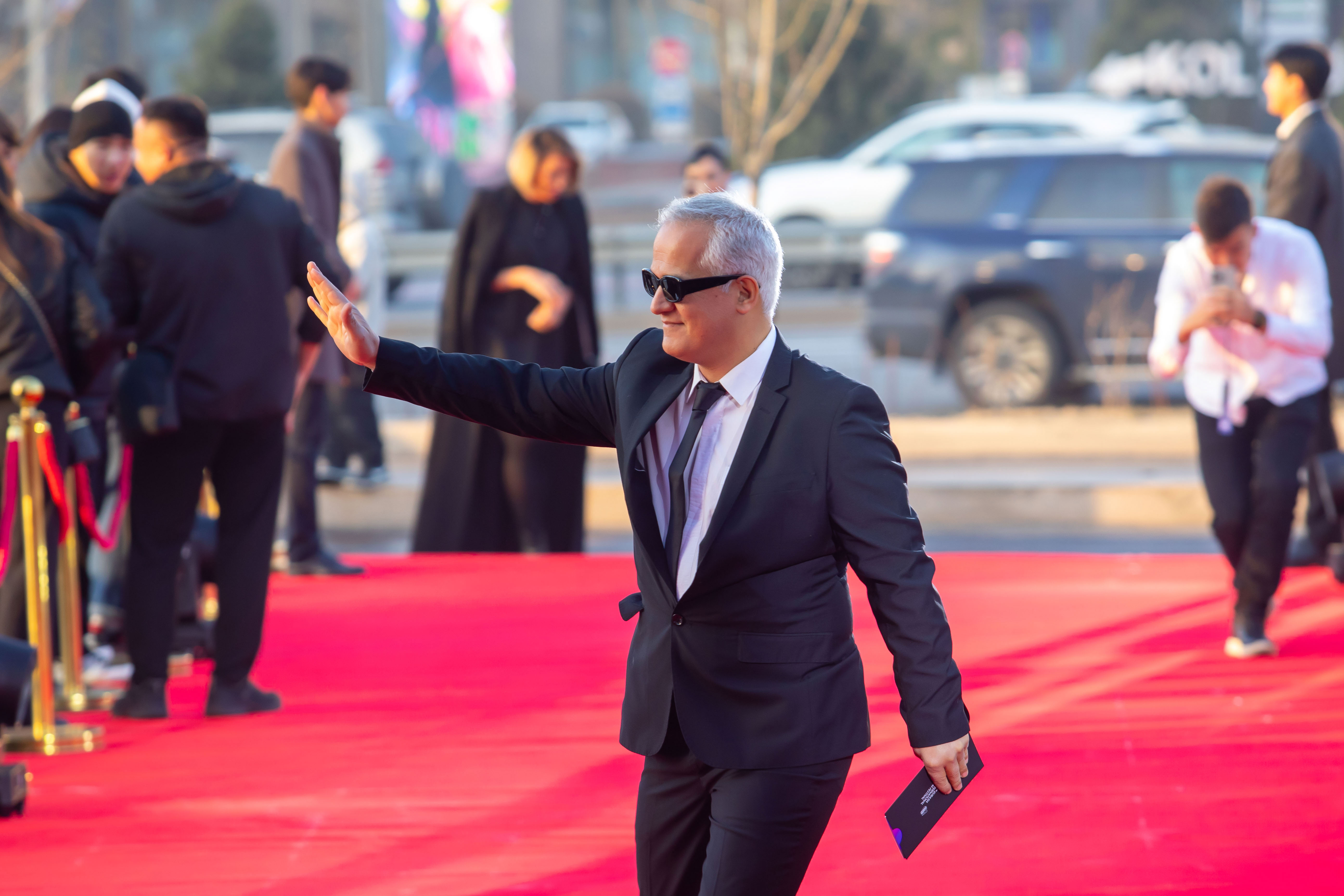
Behrouz Sebt Rasoul

Behrouz Sebt Rasoul (بهروز سبط رسول; born 7 July 1970) is an independent Iranian filmmaker, screenwriter, editor, photographer, musician, and author of two novels.

== Filmmaking career ==
Rasoul was born in Tehran in 1970.

Hee graduated from the Kharazmi University in industrial engineering, but his passion has always been the cinema.

In 2013 he founded the company Nama Film. He has made many documentaries, one wildlife documentary and 28 documentary episodes about nature, all internationally acclaimed by professionals and the public.

Tajikistan officially submitted the film Melody, directed by Rasoul, for consideration in the Best International Feature Film category at the 2025 Oscars.

== Acting career ==
Rasoul plays the leading role in Without Permission (2025), directed by British-Iranian filmmaker Hassan Nazer. The film, screened in competition at the Busan International Film Festival, explores themes of creativity and self-expression in contemporary Iran.

== Films ==
Year released	Title	Run time (min.)
2012	The Singer In Love	30
2014	The Flight Melody	45
2015	Identity	75
2016	The Hidden Way	45
2018–2020	The Most Ancient Land	1200
2020	No Rain Without Bear	
2021	Before Eleven	90
2022	Between Two Homes	62
2023	Melody	85

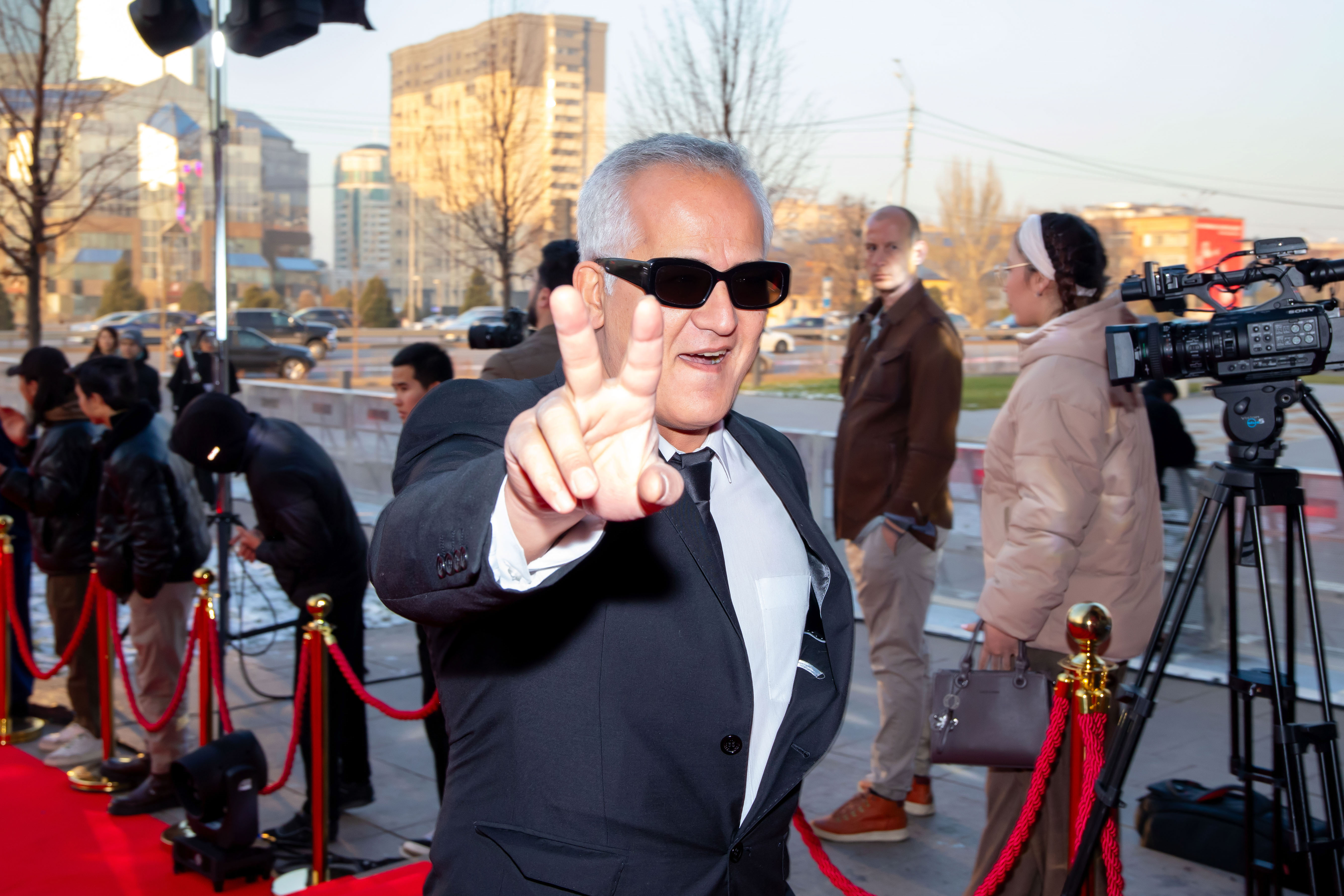
Behrouz Sebt Rasoul
