= 52nd International Film Festival of India =

2021 Indian film festival

- Official poster
- Opening film: The King of All the World (El Rey de Todo El Mundo) by Carlos Saura
- Closing film: A Hero by Asghar Farhadi
- Location: Dr. Shyama Prasad Mukherjee Indoor Stadium at Panaji, Goa, India
- Founded: 1952
- Awards: Golden Peacock: Ring Wandering by Masakazu Kaneko; Silver Peacock: Best Director: Václav Kadrnka; Best Actor: Jitendra Joshi; Best Actress: Ángela Molina; ICFT INESCO Gandhi Medal: Lingui, The Sacred Bonds by Mahamat-Saleh Haroun; Satyajit Ray Lifetime Achievement Award: Martin Scorsese István Szabó; Indian Film Personality of the Year: Hema Malini Prasoon Joshi
- Hosted by: Government of Goa; Directorate of Film Festivals
- No. of films: 300; 148 international films from 73 countries; 12 world premieres; 7 international premieres; 26 Asia premieres; 64 India premieres
- Festival date: Opening: 20 November 2021; Closing: 28 November 2021
- Website: iffigoa.org

International Film Festival of India
- 53rd 51st

The 52nd International Film Festival of India opened on 20 November 2021 with The King of All the World (El Rey de Todo El Mundo) by Carlos Saura in Goa. Like the 51st edition, this edition was held in a hybrid format which combined online and physical participation. The BRICS Film Festival was held alongside the main festival, in which films from BRICS nations, namely Brazil, Russia, South Africa, China and India, were showcased. These five countries were 'the 'countries of focus' in the 52nd edition of the festival.

In the 2021 festival, on the occasion of the birth centenary of Satyajit Ray, the Directorate of Film Festivals paid tribute to him through a 'Special Retrospective' in which his 11 specially curated films were screened. The Lifetime Achievement award, in recognition of the auteur's legacy, was named the ‘Satyajit Ray Lifetime Achievement Award’ from this year. In this edition, for the first time, streaming video platforms Netflix, Amazon Prime, Zee5, Voot and Sony Liv participated in a series of physical and virtual events.

The opening ceremony on 20 November 2021, hosted by Karan Johar and Manish Paul, was aired live. It was also streamed live on YouTube. The festival closed on 28 November with Asghar Farhadi's film A Hero, and the closing ceremony was streamed live on YouTube.

== Events ==
Being a 'hybrid' film festival, a few events were organised online also.

=== Master classes ===
- Netflix organised a three-day virtual masterclass by the school of image and arts, Gobelins, l'École de l'image, based in Paris.
- Screenwriters Sumit Purohit and Saurav Dey held master classes organised by SonyLiv.
- Nitesh Tiwari and Ashwiny Iyer Tiwari curated Breakpoint, a series on tennis stars Leander Paes and Mahesh Bhupathi, organised by ZEE5.
- 75 creative minds in the age group of 35 years and below were invited to interact with industry stalwarts and attend masterclasses.

=== Tribute ===
The festival paid tribute to:

- Dilip Kumar, Indian actor and film producer
- Sumitra Bhave, Indian filmmaker
- Buddhadeb Dasgupta, Indian poet and filmmaker
- Sanchari Vijay, Indian actor
- Surekha Sikri, Indian theatre, film and television actress
- Jean-Paul Belmondo, French actor
- Bertrand Tavernier, French director, screenwriter, actor and producer
- Christopher Plummer, Canadian actor
- Jean-Claude Carrière, French novelist, screenwriter and actor
- Sean Connery, Scottish actor
- Puneeth Rajkumar, Indian actor, singer, and dancer

=== Retrospective films section ===
The retrospective section featured Hungarian filmmaker Béla Tarr, Russian filmmaker and stage director Andrei Konchalovsky, and Dadasaheb Phalke Award winner Rajinikanth.

=== Creative minds of the future ===
75 creative minds selected in the first round by a selection jury and in the final round by a grand jury attended the 52nd International Film Festival. These '75 Creative Minds of Tomorrow' in the age group of 35 years and below interacted with industry stalwarts and attended the masterclasses.

Grand jury

- Prasoon Joshi, lyricist and chairman, Central Board of Film Certification (CBFC)
- Ketan Mehta, director
- Shankar Mahadevan, composer and singer
- Manoj Bajpayee, actor
- Resul Pookutty, Oscar winning sound recordist
- Vipul Amrutlal Shah, filmmaker

Selection jury

- Vani Tripathi, producer and actor, member of CBFC
- Anant Vijay, writer
- Yatindra Mishra, author and writer
- Sanjay Puran Singh Chauhan, filmmaker
- Sachin Khedekar, actor, director

== Jury ==
=== International jury ===
- Rakhshān Banietemad (Iran), filmmaker, chairperson
- Stephen Woolley (UK), film producer and director
- Ciro Guerra (Columbia), film director and screenwriter
- Vimukthi Jayasundara (Sri Lanka), filmmaker, critic and visual artist
- Nila Madhab Panda (India), producer and director

=== Feature film jury ===
- SV Rajendra Singh Babu (India), filmmaker and actor, works in Kannada cinema, chairperson
- Rajendra Hegde, audiographer
- Makhonmani Mongsaba, filmmaker
- Vinod Anupama, film critic
- Jayashree Bhattcharya, filmmaker
- Gyan Sahay, cinematographer
- Prasantanu Mohapatra, cinematographer
- Hemendra Bhatia, actor, writer and filmmaker
- Asim Bose, cinematographer
- Pramod Pawar, actor and filmmaker
- Manjunath T S, cinematographer
- Malay Ray, filmmaker
- Parag Chhapekar, filmmaker, journalist

=== Non-feature film jury ===
- S. Nallamuthu (India), leading wildlife and documentary filmmaker, chairperson
- Akashaditya Lama, filmmaker
- Sibanu Borah, documentary filmmaker
- Suresh Sharma, film producer
- Subrat Jyoti Neog, film critic
- Manisha Kulshreshtha, writer
- Atul Gangwar, writer

=== Preview committee ===
- Suresh Bhardwaj, ex professor and dean, NSD
- Malti Sahay, ex director, IFFI
- Manjula Shirodkar, journalist and film critic
- Satinder Mohan, ADG (Rtd) MOD, film critic
- Rajesh S. Jala, filmmaker
- Joydeep Ghosh, filmmaker and journalist
- Shyam Malick, filmmaker and journalist
- Vishnu Sharma, author, film critic, and journalist

== Official selection ==
Sections

- Kaleidoscope section
- Golden Peacock Award
- Films for debut competition
- ICFT UNESCO Gandhi Medal
- Indian Panorama
  - Feature films
  - Non-feature films
- World Panorama
- Soul of Asia
- Country of focus
- Masters of cinema
- Jury package
- Special Tribute/Homage
- Retrospective film
- Sports package
- Special screening
- India @75

=== Opening and closing films ===
Year	English title	Original title	Director(s)	Production country(s)
Opening films
2021	The King of All the World	El rey de todo el mundo	Carlos Saura	Spain, Mexico
Indian Panorama feature film
2021	Semkhor		Aimee Baruah	India
Indian Panorama non-feature film
2021	Ved...The Visionary		Rajiv Parkash	India
Mid fest film
2021	The Power of the Dog		Jane Campion	Australia, Canada, New Zealand, United Kingdom, United States
Closing film
2021	A Hero	قهرمان (Ghahreman)	Asghar Farhadi	Iran, France

=== Kaleidoscope section ===
11 films are shortlisted for screening under Kaleidoscope section.

Year	English title	Original title	Director(s)	Production country(s)
2021	Bad Luck Banging or Loony Porn	Babardeală cu bucluc sau porno balamuc	Radu Jude	Romanian
2021	Brighton 4th		Levan Koguashvili	Georgia, Russia, Bulgaria, Monaco, USA
2021	Compartment No. 6	Hytti nro 6	Juho Kuosmanen	Finland, Germany, Estonia, Russia
2021	Feathers		Omar El Zohairy	France, Egypt, The Netherlands, Greece
2021	I'm Your Man	Ich bin dein Mensch	Maria Schrader	Germany
2021	Red Rocket		Sean Baker	United States of America
2020	Souad		Ayten Amin	Egypt, Tunisia, Germany
2021	Spencer		Pablo Larraín	Germany, UK, Chile
2021	The Story of My Wife	A feleségem története	Ildikó Enyedi	Hungary, Germany, Italy, France
2021	The Worst Person in the World	Verdens verste menneske	Joachim Trier	Norway, France, Sweden, Denmark
2021	Titanium	Titane	Julia Ducournau	France, Belgium

=== Golden Peacock Award ===
Highlighted title indicates award winner

Year	English title	Original title	Director(s)	Production country(s)
2020	Any Day Now	Ensilumi	Hamy Ramezan	Finland
2021	Charlotte		Simon Franco	Paraguay
2021	Godavari		Nikhil Mahajan	India
2021	Întregalde		Radu Muntean	Romania
2021	Land of Dreams		Shirin Neshat, Shoja Azari	New Mexico, USA
2021	Leader	Lider	Katia Priwieziencew	Poland
2020	Mee Vasantrao		Nipun Avinash Dharmadhikari	India
2021	Moscow Does Not Happen	Moskvy Ne Byvayet	Dmitry Fedorov	Russia
2021	No Ground Beneath the Feet		Mohammad Rabby Mridha	Bangladesh
2021	Once We Were Good For You	A bili smo vam dobri	Branko Schmidt	Croatia, Bosnia and Herzegovina
2021	Ring Wandering	リング・ワンダリング	Masakazu Kaneko	Japan
2021	Saving One Who Was Dead	Zpráva o záchraně mrtvého	Václav Kadrnka	Czech Republic
2021	Semkhor		Aimee Baruah	India
2021	The Dorm	Общага	Roman Vasyanov	Russia
2021	The First Fallen	Los Primeiros Soldados	Rodrigo de Oliveira	Brazil

=== Films for debut competition ===
Highlighted title indicates award winner

Year	English title	Original title	Director(s)	Production country(s)
2020	Dollu		Sagar Puranik	India
2020	Funeral		Vivek Rajendra Dubey	India
2021	Magoado		Rubén Sainz	Spain
2021	Maman		Arash Aneessee	Iran
2021	Pack of Sheep		Dimitris Kanellopoulos	Greece
2021	Rain		Janno Jürgens	Estonia
2021	Sweet Disaster		Laura Lehmus	Germany
2021	The Wealth of the World	La riqueza del mundo	Simon Farriol	Chile, Italy
2021	Zahorí		Marí Alessandrini	Switzerland, Argentina, Chile, France

=== IFFI ICFT UNESCO Gandhi Medal ===
Highlighted title indicates award winner

Year	English title	Original title	Director(s)	Production country(s)
2021	21st Tiffin	21મું ટિફિન	Vijaygiri Bava	India
2021	Commitment Hasan	Bağlılık Hasan	Semih Kaplanoğlu	Turkey
2021	Killing the Eunuch Khan	Persian: کشتن خواجه	Abed Abest	Iran
2021	Lingui, The Sacred Bonds	Lingui, les liens sacrés	Mahamat-Saleh Haroun	Chad, France, Belgium, Germany
2021	Night Forest	Nachtwald	André Hörmann, Katrin Milhahn	Germany
2021	Niraye Thathakalulla Maram	നിറയെ തത്തകളുള്ള മരം	Jayaraj	India
2020	Pebbles	Koozhangal	Vinothraj P S	India
2021	Tokyo Shaking		Olivier Peyon	France
2020	When Pomegranates Howl		Granaz Moussavi	Australia, Afghanistan

=== Indian Panorama ===
In Indian Panorama, feature and non-feature films of cinematic, thematic, and aesthetic excellence are selected for the promotion of film art through the non-profit screening of these films under different categories.

==== Feature films ====
India's entry for the 2022 Academy Awards, Tamil film Koozhangal, was screened in the Indian Panorama feature film segment. 24 feature films reflecting the vibrancy and diversity of the Indian film industry were selected out of 221 contemporary films for screening.

Title of the film	Language	Director(s)	Producer(s)
21st Tiffin (Ekvismu Tiffin)	Gujarati	Vijaygiri Bava	
Abhijaan	Bengali	Parambrata Chatterjee	Ratan Shree Nirman, Roadshow Films Pvt Ltd
Act 1978	Kannada	Manjunatha S. (Mansore)	
Alpha Beta Gamma	Hindi	Shankar Srikumar	Jithin Raj, Menka Sharma, Mona Shankar, Thomas Punnoose
Bhagavadajjukam	Sanskrit	Yadu Vijayakrishnan	
Bittersweet	Marathi	Anant Mahadevan	
Boomba Ride	Mishing	Biswajeet Bora	
Dollu	Kannada	Sagar Puranik	
Eight Down Toofaan Mail	Hindi	Akriti Singh	Storia Senza Storia
Funeral	Marathi	Vivek Rajendra Dubey	
Godavari	Marathi	Nikhil Mahajan	Jitendra Joshi, Mitali Joshi, Pavan Malu, Nikhil Mahajan
Kalkokkho (House of Time)	Bengali	Rajdeep Paul & Sarmistha Maiti	
Manikbabur Megh (The Cloud & the Man)	Bengali	Abhinandan Banerjee	Bauddhayan Mukherji, Monalisa Mukherji
Mee Vasantrao	Marathi	Nipun Avinash Dharmadhikari	
Natyam	Telugu	Revanth Korukonda	Sandhya Raju
Neeli Hakki	Kannada	Ganesh Hegde	Ganesh, Suman Shetty, Vinay Shetty
Niraye Thathakalulla Maram	Malayalam	Jayaraj	
Nitantoi Sahaj Saral	Bengali	Satrabit Paul	
Koozhangal	Tamil	Vinothraj P S	Nayanthara, Vignesh Shivan
Prawaas	Marathi	Shashank Udapurkar	Om Chhangani
Semkhor	Dimasa	Aimee Baruah	
Sijou	Bodo	Vishal P. Chaliha	
Sunny	Malayalam	Ranjith Sankar	Jayasurya, Ranjith Sankar
Taledanda	Kannada	Praveen Krupakar	Kripanidhi Kreations

==== Non-feature films ====
Title of the film	Language	Director(s)
Bablu Babylon Se	Hindi	Abhijeet Sarthi
Backstage	Oriya	Lipka Singh Darai
Badal Sircar & the Alternative Theatre	English	Ashok Viswanathan
Bharat Prakriti Ka Balak	Hindi	Dr. Deepika Kothari & Ramji Om
Ganga-Putra	Hindi	Jai Prakash
Gajra	Hindi	Vineet Sharma
Jugalbandi	Hindi	Chetan Bhakuni
Murmurs of the Jungle	Marathi	Sohil Vaidya
Naad – The Sound	Bengali	Abhijit Ashok Paul (Abhijit A Paul)
Pabung Syam	Manipuri	Haobam Paban Kumar
The Knocker	Hindi	Ananth Narayan Mahadevan
Sainbari To Sandeshkhali	Bengali	Sanghamitra Chaudhuri
The Spell of Purple	Gujarati	Prachee Bajania
Sunpat	Garhwali	Rahul Rawat
Surmounting Challenges	English	Satish Pande
Sweet Biriyani	Tamil	Jeyachandra Hashmi
Teen Adhyay	Hindi	Subash Sahoo
Veerangana	Assamese	Kishore Kalita
Ved...The Visionary	English	Rajiv Parkash
Witch	Santali	Jackie R. Bala

=== World Panorama ===
55 films were invited for screening under the World Panorama section.

Year	English title	Original title	Director(s)	Production country(s)
2021	1000 Dreams	Мин кыял	Marat Sarulu	Kyrgyzstan
2021	A Film About Couples	Una Película Sobre Parejas	Natalia Cabral, Oriol Estrada	Dominican Republic
2021	A Higher Law	Balaur	Octav Chelaru	Romania, Germany, Serbia
2021	Absence		Ali Mosaffa	Iran, Czech Republic, Slovak Republic
2021	Abu Omar		Roy Krispel	Israel
2021	Anaïs in Love	Les Amours d’Anaïs	Charline Bourgeois-Tacquet	France
2021	Asterrarium		Armen H'Akopian	Russian
2021	Atlantide		Yuri Ancarani	Italy, France, US, Qatar
2021	Bebia, À Mon Seul Désir		Juja Dobrachkous	Georgia, UK
2021	Bergman Island		Mia Hansen-Løve	France, Germany, Belgium, Sweden
2021	Captain Volkonogov Escaped	Капитан Волконогов бежал	Natalya Merkulova, Aleksey Chupov	Russia
2021	Celts	Kelt	Milica Tomović	Serbia
2021	Clara Sola		Nathalie Álvarez Mesén	Sweden, Costa Rica, Belgium
2021	Dark Matter		Iman Tahsin	Andorra
2021	Fathers		Salem Salavati	Iran
2021	Hinterland		Stefan Ruzowitzky	Austria, Luxembourg
2021	Holy Island		Robert Manson	Ireland
2021	Humanization		Giulio Musi	Sweden
2021	Islands		Martin Edralin	Canada
2021	Lamb	Dýrið	Valdimar Jóhannsson	Iceland, Sweden, Poland
2021	Love Songs for Tough Guys	Cette musique ne joue pour personne	Samuel Benchetrit	France, Belgium
2021	Luzzu		Alex Camilleri	Malta
2021	Miss Osaka		Daniel Dencik	Denmark, Norway, Japan
2021	Nightride		Stephen Fingleton	United Kingdom
2021	Ninjababy		Yngvild Sve Flikke	Norway
2021	Our Father		David Pantaleón	Spain
2021	Out of Sync	Tres	Juanjo Giménez	Spain, Lithuania, France
2021	Patio of Illusion		Shangshi Chen	Macau
2021	Private Desert		Aly Muritiba	Brazil, Portugal
2021	Promises		Thomas Kruithof	France
2021	Pure White		Necip Caghan Ozdemir	Turkey
2021	Rafaela		Tito Rodriguez	Dominican Republic
2021	Rhino	Носоріг	Oleh Sentsov	Ukraine, Poland, Germany
2021	Saloum		Jean Luc Herbulot	Senegal
2021	Silent Land	Cicha Ziemia	Aga Woszczyńska	Poland, Italy, Czech Republic
2021	Tailor		Sonia Liza Kenterman	Greece, Germany, Belgium
2021	The Blind Man Who Did Not Want To See the Titanic	Sokea mies, joka ei halunnut nähdä Titanicia	Teemu Nikki	Finland
2021	The Book of Delights		Marcela Lordy	Brazil
2021	The Exam		Shawkat Amin Korki	Germany, Iraq, Qatar
2021	The Giants	I giganti	Bonifacio Angius	Italy
2021	The Girl and The Spider		Ramon Zürcher, Silvan Zürcher	Switzerland
2021	The Gravedigger's Wife		Khadar Ayderus Ahmed	France, Somalia, Germany, Finland
2021	The Guest		Ana Mancera	Spain
2021	The Hotel		Aleksandr Baluev	Russia
2021	The Innocents	De uskyldige	Eskil Vogt	Norway, Sweden, Denmark, Finland, France, United Kingdom
2021	The Night Belongs to Lovers	La Nuit Aux Amants	Julien Hilmoine	France
2021	The Odd-Job Men	Sis dies corrents	Neus Ballús	Spain
2021	The Preacher	El Rezador	Tito Jara H.	Ecuador, Colombia, Spain
2021	The Red Tree	El árbol rojo	Joan Gómez Endara	Colombia, Panama, France
2021	The Restless	Les Intranquilles	Joachim Lafosse	France, Belgium, Luxembourg
2021	The Seed	Die Saat	Mia Maariel Meyer	Germany
2021	The Staffroom	Zbornica	Sonja Tarokić	Croatia
2021	The Sun of that Moon		Setareh Eskandari	Iran
2021	Unbalanced		Juan Baldana	Argentina
2021	What We Know		Jordi Núñez	Spain

=== Soul of Asia ===
Six films were slated for screening under this section.

Year	English title	Original title	Director(s)	Production country(s)
2021	Ahed's Knee	הַבֶּרֶךְ	Nadav Lapid	Israel, France, Germany
2021	Costa Brava, Lebanon		Mounia Akl	Lebanon, France, Qatar, Spain, Sweden, Denmark, Norway, United States
2021	Onoda: 10,000 Nights in the Jungle	Onoda, 10 000 nuits dans la jungle	Arthur Harari	France
2021	Wheel of Fortune and Fantasy	偶然と想像	Ryusuke Hamaguchi	Japan
2021	Whether the Weather Is Fine	Kun Maupay Man it Panahon	Carlo Francisco Manatad	Philippines
2021	Yuni		Kamila Andini	Indonesia, Singapore, France, Australia

=== Country of focus ===
The 6th edition of BRICS Film Festival was held alongside main festival, in which films from BRICS nations, namely Brazil, Russia, South Africa, China and India, are showcased. These five countries are 'countries of focus'.

Year	English title	Original title	Director(s)	Production country(s)
2018	Antes Que Eu Me Esqueça		Tiago Arakilian	Brazil
2020	Barakat		Amy Jephta	South Africa
2021	Día de los Muertos	ДЕНЬ МЁРТВЫХ	Viktor Ryzhakov	Russia
2020	Doctor Lisa	Доктор Лиза	Oksana Karas	Russia
2021	Hi, Mom	你好，李焕英	Jia Ling	China
2018	Odessa	Одесса	Valery Todorovsky	Russia
2017	On Wheels		Mauro D'Addio	Brazil
2020	Sons of the Sea		John Gutierrez	South Africa
2019	T-34		Aleksey Sidorov	Russia
2016	The Great Wall	长城	Zhang Yimou	China
2021	The Whaler Boy	Kitoboy	Philipp Yuryev	Belgium, Poland, Russia
2021	A Writer's Odyssey	刺杀小说家	Lu Yang	China
2016	Xuan Zang	玄奘	Huo Jianqi	China

=== Masters of cinema ===
Year	English title	Original title	Director	Production country(s)
2021	Everything Went Fine	Tout s'est bien passé	François Ozon	France
2021	In Front of Your Face	당신 얼굴 앞에서	Hong Sang-soo	South Korea
2021	Memoria		Apichatpong Weerasethakul	Thailand, Colombia, France, Germany, Mexico, China
2021	Parallel Mothers	Madres paralelas	Pedro Almodóvar	Spain
2021	Suzanna Andler		Benoît Jacquot	France
2021	Tom Medina		Tony Gatlif	France

=== Jury package ===
Year	English title	Original title	Director	Production country(s)
1992	The Crying Game		Neil Jordan	UK, Japan
2015	Embrace of the Serpent	El abrazo de la serpiente	Ciro Guerra	Columbia, Venezuela, Argentina
2005	The Forsaken Land	Sulanga Enu Pinisa	Vimukthi Jayasundara	Sri Lanka, France
2010	I Am Kalam		Nila Madhab Panda	India
1995	The Blue Veiled	روسری‌آبی	Rakhshān Banietemad	Iran

=== Special tribute ===
Year	English title	Original title	Director	Production country(s)
Sean Connery
1963	From Russia with Love		Terence Young	United Kingdom
1964	Goldfinger		Guy Hamilton	United Kingdom
1967	You Only Live Twice		Lewis Gilbert	United Kingdom, United States
1987	Untouchables		Brian De Palma	United States
1990	The Hunt For Red October		John McTiernan	United States
Homage
Bertrand Tavernier
1984	A Sunday in the Country	Un dimanche à la campagne	Bertrand Tavernier	France
Christopher Plummer
2017	All the Money in the World		Ridley Scott	United States, United Kingdom
Jean-Claude Carriere
2018	At Eternity's Gate		Julian Schnabel	United States, France
Jean-Paul Belmondo
1960	Breathless	À bout de souffle	Jean-Luc Godard	France
Surekha Sikri
2018	Badhaai Ho		Amit Sharma	India
Dilip Kumar
1955	Devdas		Bimal Roy	India
Buddhadeb Dasgupta
2005	Kaalpurush		Buddhadeb Dasgupta	India
Puneeth Rajkumar
2017	Raajakumara		Santhosh Ananddram	India
Waman Bhonsle Indian film editor
1977	Inkaar		Raj Sippy	India
Sanchari Vijay
2015	Naanu Avanalla...Avalu		B. S. Lingadevaru	India

=== Retrospective films ===
Year	English title	Original title	Cast/ director
Martin Scorsese
1976	Taxi Driver		Robert De Niro, Jodie Foster, Albert Brooks, Harvey Keitel, Leonard Harris, Peter Boyle, Cybill Shepherd
1990	Goodfellas		Robert De Niro, Ray Liotta, Joe Pesci, Lorraine Bracco, Paul Sorvino
2010	Shutter Island		Leonardo DiCaprio, Mark Ruffalo, Ben Kingsley, Michelle Williams
2013	The Wolf of Wall Street		Leonardo DiCaprio, Jonah Hill
István Szabó (Hungary)
1966	Father	Apa	András Bálint, Miklós Gábor
1981	Mephisto		Klaus Maria Brandauer, Krystyna Janda, Ildikó Bánsági
1985	Colonel Redl	Redl ezredes	Klaus Maria Brandauer, Hans Christian Blech
2001	Taking Sides		Harvey Keitel, Stellan Skarsgård
Béla Tarr (Hungary)
1979	Family Nest	Családi tüzfészek	Laszlone Horvath, László Horváth
1981	The Outsider	Szabadgyalog	András Szabó, Jolan Fodor
1988	Damnation	Kárhozat	Miklós B. Székely, Vali Kerekes
2011	The Turin Horse	A torinói ló	János Derzsi, Erika Bók
Andrei Konchalovsky (Russia)
1965	The First Teacher	Первый учитель	Bolot Beyshenaliyev, Natalya Arinbasarova
1970	Uncle Vanya	Дядя Ваня	Innokenti Smoktunovsky, Sergei Bondarchuk
1985	Runaway Train		Jon Voight, Eric Roberts
2014	The Postman's White Nights	Белые ночи почтальона Алексея Тряпицына	Aleksey Tryapitsyn, Timur Bondarenko
2016	Paradise	Рай; Ray	Yuliya Vysotskaya, Christian Clauß
Rajinikanth (India)
1977	Avargal		K. Balachander
1989	ChaalBaaz		Pankaj Parashar
1976	Katha Sangama		Puttanna Kanagal

=== Sports package ===
Year	English title	Original title	Director(s)	Production country(s)
2020	The Champion	Mistrz	Maciej Barczewski	Poland
2020	Fighter	파이터	Jéro YUN	South Korea
2021	Olga		Elie Grappe	Switzerland
2021	Rookie		Lieven Van Baelen	Belgium

=== Special screening ===
Year	English title	Original title	Director(s)	Production country(s)	Platform
2021	Dhamaka		Ram Madhvani	India	Netflix
2021	The Power of the Dog		Jane Campion	Australia, Canada, New Zealand, United Kingdom, United States	Netflix
2021	Chhorii		Vishal Furia	India	Amazon Prime Video
2021	The Family Man		Raj Nidimoru and Krishna D.K.	India	Amazon Prime Video
2021	Sardar Udham		Shoojit Sircar	India	Amazon Prime Video
Satyajit Ray
1962	Abhijan	অভিযান	Satyajit Ray	India	Amazon Prime Video
1956	Aparajito	অপরাজিত	Satyajit Ray	India	Amazon Prime Video
1973	Ashani Sanket	অশনি সংকেত	Satyajit Ray	India	Amazon Prime Video
1967	Chiriakhana		Satyajit Ray	India	Amazon Prime Video
1964	Charulata	Cārulatā	Satyajit Ray	India	Amazon Prime Video
1969	Hirak Rajar Deshe		Satyajit Ray	India	Amazon Prime Video
1958	Jalsaghar	জলসাঘর	Satyajit Ray	India	Amazon Prime Video
1955	Pather Panchali		Satyajit Ray	India	Amazon Prime Video
1971	Seemabaddha	সীমাবদ্ধ	Satyajit Ray	India	Amazon Prime Video
1974	Sonar Kella	সোনার কেল্লা	Satyajit Ray	India	Amazon Prime Video
1977	Shatranj Ke Khilari		Satyajit Ray	India	Amazon Prime Video

=== India @75 ===
Year	Original title	English translation	Director(s)	Language
1996	Agantuk	The Stranger	Satyajit Ray	Bengali
2016	Airlift		Raja Krishna Menon	Hindi
2018	Andhadhun	Blindly	Sriram Raghavan	Hindi
2012	Baboo Band Baaja		Rajesh Pinjani	Marathi
1985	Bettada Hoovu	Mountain Flower	N. Lakshminarayan	Kannada
1948	Chanderlekha		S. S. Vasan	Tamil
1985	Chidambaram	Chidambaram	G. Aravindan	Malayalam
2019	Eigi Kona	Stallone, My Pony	Bobby Wahengbam, Maipaksana Haorongbam	Manipuri
1965	Guide		Vijay Anand	Hindi
2006	Joymoti	Joymoti the saviour	Manju Borah	Assamese
2014	Kaaka Muttai	The Crow's Egg	M. Manikandan	Tamil
1957	Kabuliwala		Tapan Sinha	Bengali
2015	Kaasav	Turtle	Sumitra Bhave, Sunil Sukthankar	Marathi
1966	Sandhya Raga		A. C. Narasimha Murthy, S K Bhagvan	Kannada
1983	Sagara Sangamam	Confluence	K. Viswanath	Telugu
1955	Shree 420		Raj Kapoor	Hindi
1959	Sujata		Bimal Roy	Hindi
1981	Thanneer Thanneer	Water... Water	K. Balachander	Tamil

== Awards and winners ==
- Golden Peacock (Best Film): The award carries a cash prize of ₹40 lakh (US$42,000) shared equally between the director and producer. The director will receive the 'Golden Peacock' and a certificate in addition to the cash prize. The Producer will receive a certificate in addition to the cash.
- Silver Peacock:
  - Best Director: Silver Peacock, certificate and a cash prize of ₹15 lakh (US$16,000)
  - Best Actor: Silver Peacock, certificate and a cash prize of ₹10 lakh (US$10,000)
  - Best Actress: Silver Peacock, certificate and a cash prize of ₹10 lakh (US$10,000)
  - Best Debut Film of a Director: Silver Peacock, certificate and a cash prize of ₹10 lakh (US$10,000)
  - Special Jury Award: Silver Peacock, certificate and a cash prize of ₹15 lakh (US$16,000) given to a film or an individual. The award will be given to the director of the film in case a film wins the award.
  - Special Mention:
- ICFT UNESCO Gandhi Medal
- Stayajit Ray Lifetime Achievement Award
- Indian Film Personality of the Year Award

=== Winners ===
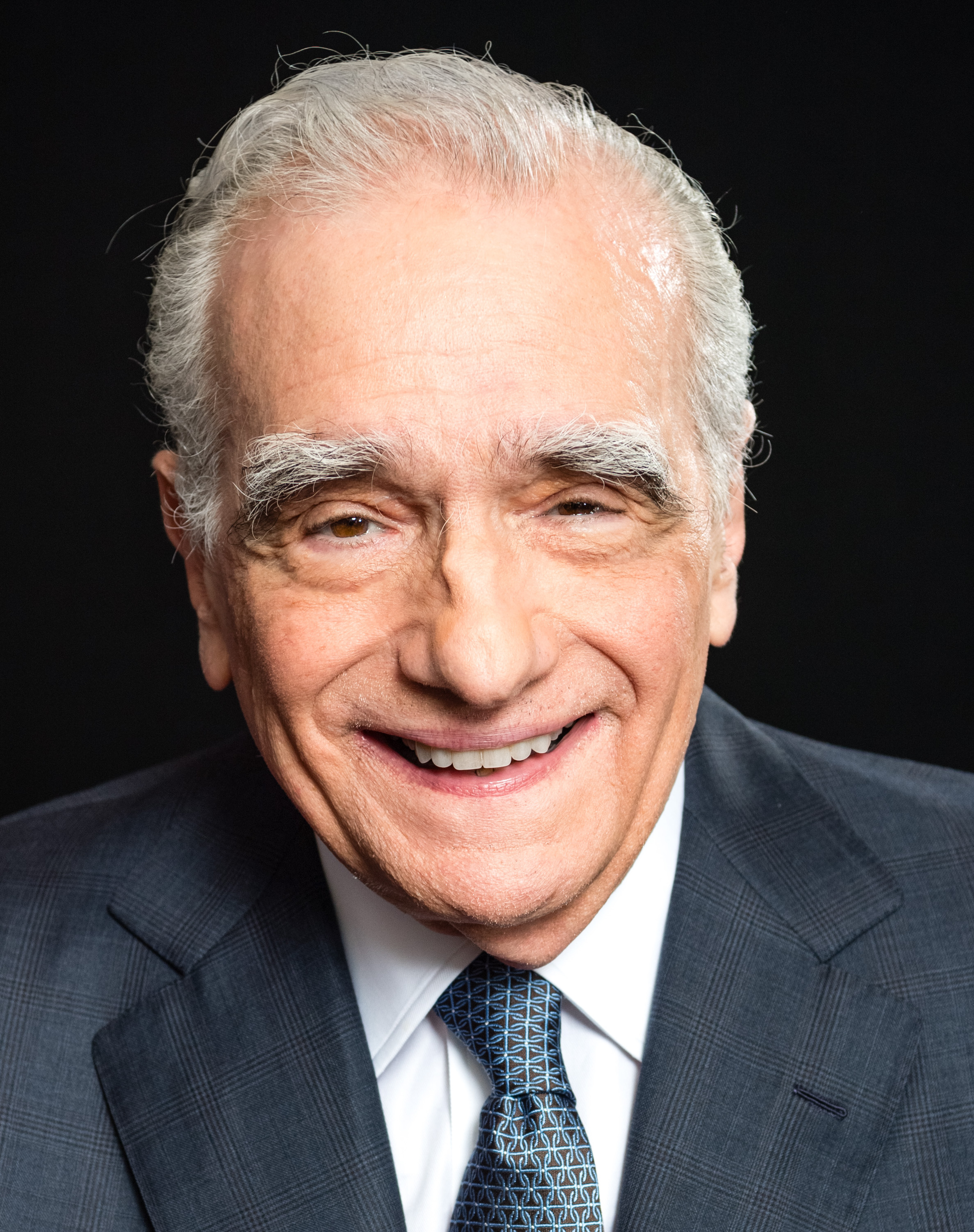
Martin Scorsese, recipient of Satyajit Ray Lifetime Achievement Award

Winner(s)	Work/ director	Notes	Ref.
Satyajit Ray Lifetime Achievement Award
Martin Scorsese		Honoured	
István Szabó		Honoured	
Indian Film Personality of the Year
Hema Malini		Honoured	
Prasoon Joshi		Honoured	
Golden Peacock (Best Film)
Ring Wandering	Masakazu Kaneko	Won	
Silver Peacock
Best Director
Václav Kadrnka	Saving One Who Was Dead	Won	
Best Actor
Jitendra Joshi	Godavari	Won	
Best Actress
Ángela Molina	Charlotte	Won	
Best Debut Film of a Director
Zahorí	Marí Alessandrini	Won	
Special Jury Award
Renata Carvalho	The First Fallen	Won	
Nikhil Mahajan	Godavari	Won	
Special Mention
The Wealth of the World	Simon Farriol	Won	
Roman Vasyanov	The Dorm	Won	
ICFT UNESCO Gandhi Medal
Lingui, The Sacred Bonds	Mahamat-Saleh Haroun	Won	

=== Winners BRICS Film Festival ===
Winner(s)	Work/ director	Country	Ref.
Best Film
Barakat	Amy Jephta	South Africa	
The Sun Above Me Never Sets	Lyubov Borisova	Russia	
Best Director
Lucia Marat	Ana	Brazil	
Best Actor
Dhanush	Asuran	India	
Best Actress
Lara Boldorini	On Wheels	Brazil	
Jury Special Mention
Han Yan	A Little Red Flower	China	

== See also ==
- List of film festivals in India
- 50th International Film Festival of India
