= IFFI Indian Film Personality of the Year Award =

Indian film festival award

IFFI Indian Film Personality Awards
- Awarded for: "Outstanding contribution to the growth and development of Bharatiya cinema"
- Sponsored by: International Film Festival of India
- First award: 2013; 13 years ago
- Final award: 2025
- Most recent winner(s): Vikrant Massey (Film personality, 2024); Nandamuri Balakrishna (Special recognition, 2025)

Highlights
- Total awarded: 14
- First winner: Waheeda Rahman

The IFFI Indian Film Personality of the Year and Special Recognition for Contribution to Bharatiya Cinema Award are the two national honours instituted by the International Film Festival of India. The recipients are honoured for their "outstanding contribution to the growth and development of Cinema of India". The award was first instituted in 2013 at the 44th IFFI.

Since 2013, on the occasion of 100 years of Cinema of India, the Award for the "Indian Film Personality of the Year" was instituted. The annual award is presented to an Indian film personality for their outstanding contribution to the Indian Film Industry through their craft. The Award consists of a Silver Peacock Medal, a certificate and a cash prize of ₹ 10,00,000.

On the occasion of Golden Jubilee year of IFFI, veteran actor Rajinikanth was conferred with the "Golden Jubilee ICON Award" in the year 2019. At the 54th IFFI 2023 Special Recognition for Contribution to Bharatiya Cinema Award was instituted.

== Indian Film Personality of the Year (2013–Present) ==
Edition	Image	Awardee	Craft
44th		Waheeda Rahman	Actress
45th		Rajinikanth	Actor
46th		Ilaiyaraaja	Composer
47th		S. P. Balasubrahmanyam	Playback singer and composer
48th		Amitabh Bachchan	Actor
49th		Salim Khan	Screenwriter
51st		Biswajit Chatterjee	Actor
52nd		Hema Malini	Actress
52nd		Prasoon Joshi	Lyricist
53rd		Chiranjeevi	Actor
55th		Vikrant Massey	Actor

== IFFI Golden Jubilee ICON Award ==
Edition	Image	Awardee	Craft
50th		Rajinikanth	Actor

== IFFI Special Recognition for Contribution to Bharatiya Cinema Award ==
Edition	Image	Awardee	Craft
54th		Madhuri Dixit	Actress
55th		Allu Arjun	Actor
56th		Nandamuri Balakrishna	Actor
