= Murmurs of the Jungle =

Indian short documentary-fiction film

- Directed by: Sohil Vaidya
- Written by: Sohil Vaidya
- Produced by: Sohil Vaidya
- Narrated by: Sumant Shinde
- Cinematography: Digvijay Thorat
- Edited by: Sohil Vaidya
- Release date: 2021
- Running time: 20 minutes
- Country: India
- Language: Marathi

Murmurs of the Jungle (Marathi: Aadigunjan) is a 2021 Indian short documentary‑fiction film written, directed, produced, and edited by Sohil Vaidya. The film received the National Film Award for Best Documentary at the 70th National Film Awards.

The director, Sohil Vaidya, based between Pune and Los Angeles, was inspired by a personal interest in mythology and its relevance in contemporary life.

== Synopsis ==
Set in a small indigenous settlement in the Western Ghats, the film portrays a grandmother recounting to her grandson the origins of their village, entwined with stories of deities, spirits, and ancestral connections to the forest Through mist-shrouded landscapes and natural soundscapes, the film explores memory, mortality, and humanity’s enduring link with nature.

== Awards ==
At the 70th National Film Awards in 2024, the film received the Rajat Kamal (Silver Lotus) for Best Non-Feature Film (Documentary), and voice-over artist Sumant Shinde was also recognized for his contribution.
