= 55th International Film Festival of India =

2024 Indian film festival

- Official poster
- Opening film: Better Man by Michael Gracey
- Closing film: Dry Season by Bohdan Sláma
- Location: Dr. Shyama Prasad Mukherjee Indoor Stadium at Panaji, Goa, India
- Founded: 1952
- Awards: Golden Peacock: Toxic by Saulė Bliuvaitė; Silver Peacock: Best Director: Bogdan Mureșanu, for The New Year That Never Came; Best Actor: Clément Favreau for Holy Cow; Best Actress: Vesta Matulyte and Vilma Raubaitė for Toxic; Best Debut Film of a Director: Familiar Touch by Sarah Friedland
- Hosted by: Government of Goa; Directorate of Film Festivals
- No. of films: 180
- Festival date: Opening: 20 November 2024; Closing: 28 November 2024
- Website: iffigoa.org

International Film Festival of India
- 56th 54th

The 55th International Film Festival of India took place from 20 to 28 November 2024 at Panaji, Goa. The theme of this year's festival was 'Young Filmmakers – The Future is Now', so this year a new section and award category 'Best Debut Director of Indian Feature Film' has been introduced in the festival to encourage young blood. The award is a certificate and cash prize of ₹5 lakh in recognition of young directorial talent from India. The festival screened over 180 international films from 81 countries, including 15 world premieres.

As announced on 11 November, Indian filmmaker Ashutosh Gowariker served as the chairperson of the international jury, and Phillip Noyce, an Australian film and television director, was the recipient of Satyajit Ray Lifetime Achievement Award. 15 films competed for the Golden Peacock award in main competition. Australia was designated as the 'Country of Focus' at the festival, with seven Australian films screened, highlighting the country's rich storytelling traditions, including indigenous and contemporary narratives. The festival honoured the 100th anniversary of four legendary figures in Indian cinema, actor–director Raj Kapoor, filmmaker Tapan Sinha, actor Akkineni Nageswara Rao, and singer Mohammed Rafi, through a dedicated tribute program.

The festival opened with Australian film on the life of the British pop star Robbie Williams, Better Man by Michael Gracey. Abhishek Banerjee and Bhumi Pednekar hosted the opening ceremony which was telecast live on YouTube.

The festival closed on 28 November with Dry Season by Bohdan Sláma. Lithuanian drama film Toxic by Saulė Bliuvaitė, was awarded the best film award, the Golden Peacock. Romanian director Bogdan Mureșanu was awarded the Best Director award for the Romanian historical tragicomedy film The New Year That Never Came.

== Overview ==
On 6 September 2024, The National Film Development Corporation of India under Ministry of Information and Broadcasting (India), organised a Roadshow to kick off the 55th edition of the International Film Festival of India. The Roadshow was held at the NFDC Premises on Pedder Road, Mumbai. On 25 October, the films selected for the Indian Panorama section, along with the juries for the feature and non-feature categories, were announced. A Hindi–language biographical film Swatantrya Veer Savarkar, will open the Panorama section.

The festival is celebrating the centenary of four icons of Indian cinema—actor-director Raj Kapoor, filmmaker Tapan Sinha, Telugu thespian Akkineni Nageswara Rao, and singer Mohammed Rafi with a special tribute program. In its 55th edition, the festival will showcase restored classics from these legends, including Kapoor's 1951 crime drama film Awaara, Sinha's 1976 film Harmonium, Akkineni's 1953 film Devadasu, and 1961 film Hum Dono, highlighting Rafi's memorable vocals. The curtain raiser press conference was held on 11 November, attended by union minister of state for Information & Broadcasting, festival director Shekhar Kapur, Central Board of Film Certification chairman, and other senior ministry officials. It was revealed that the 'International Competition' section has 15 feature films, which will compete for the coveted Golden Peacock and ₹40 lakhs. Whereas 'Best Feature Film Debut Director' section has five International plus two Indian Films, which will compete for the Silver Peacock, ₹10 lakh and a certificate. 'IFFIesta’ an entertainment zone, where films, music, and culture converge to enhance youth participation and engagement at the festival will be set up.

== Opening and closing ceremonies ==
=== Opening ceremony ===
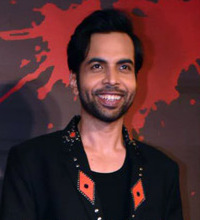
Abhishek Banerjee, host opening ceremony

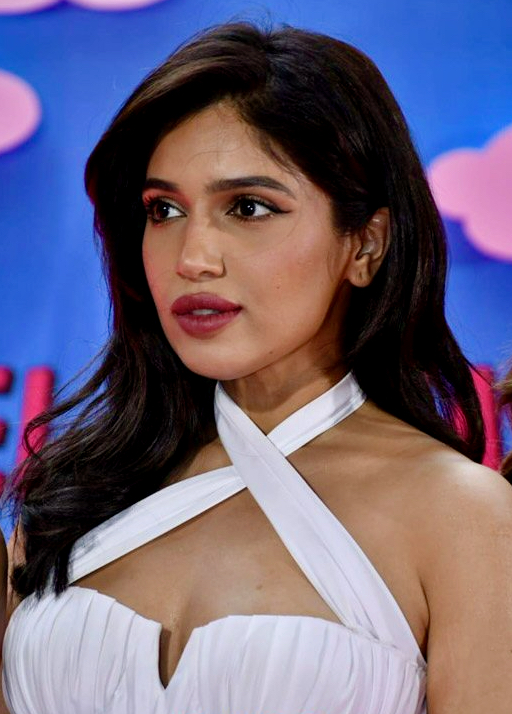
Bhumi Pednekar, host opening ceremony

Abhishek Banerjee and Bhumi Pednekar hosted the opening ceremony which was graced with live performances from Ishaan Khatter and Manushi Chhillar. Sanya Malhotra and Sunny Kaushal brought the history of Indian cinema to life through a musical tableau, spanning from 1913 to the present day. This year's Country of Focus, Australia, delighted the audience with mesmerizing dance performances. The centennial celebrations of Indian cinema legends Raj Kapoor, Tapan Sinha, Akkineni Nageswara Rao, and Mohammed Rafi were honored in the presence of their families, with commemorative postage stamps released in their memory.

=== Closing ceremony ===
The festival closed on 28 November with Dry Season, a Czech drama film directed by Bohdan Sláma, which focuses on a conflict between two family clans. The ceremony hosted by Samir Kochhar, and attended by director Ramesh Sippy, actor-producer Nivin Pauly, and actor Pratik Gandhi, featured a performance titled 'Rhythms of India'. This showcase celebrated a rich tapestry of dance forms, including Kathak, Garba, Mohiniyattam, Kathakali, Manipuri, and the vibrant Pung Cholam Drummers. It concluded with the Lithuanian film Toxic by Saulė Bliuvaitė winning the Golden Peacock award, while Clément Favreau was honored as Best Actor for his performance in the French film Holy Cow.

== Events ==
- Master classes
  - Anupam Kher 23 November 2024
  - Shabana Azmi 25 November 2024
  - John Seale 25 November 2024
  - Phillip Noyce 25 November 2024
  - Senthil Kumar 26 November 2024
  - Chris Kirschbaum, Senior Animator for Avengers: Infinity War, 26 November 2024
- In conversation:
  - Mani Ratnam 22 November 2024
  - Nagarjuna 22 November 2024
- Panel Discussions:
  - Women Safety and Cinema 21 November 2024

Panelists
Imtiaz Ali, Suhasini Maniratnam and Kushboo Sundar, and moderated by Vani Tripathi Tikoo

- Centenary Special – Celebrating the Life and Works of Raj Kapoor 24 November 2024

Panelists
Ranbir Kapoor and Rahul Rawail

- Centenary Session – The Spectrum and the Soul Tapan Sinha 27 November 2024

Panelists
Arjun Chakraborty, Manu Chakraborty and Ratnottama Sengupta

== Jury ==
=== International Jury ===
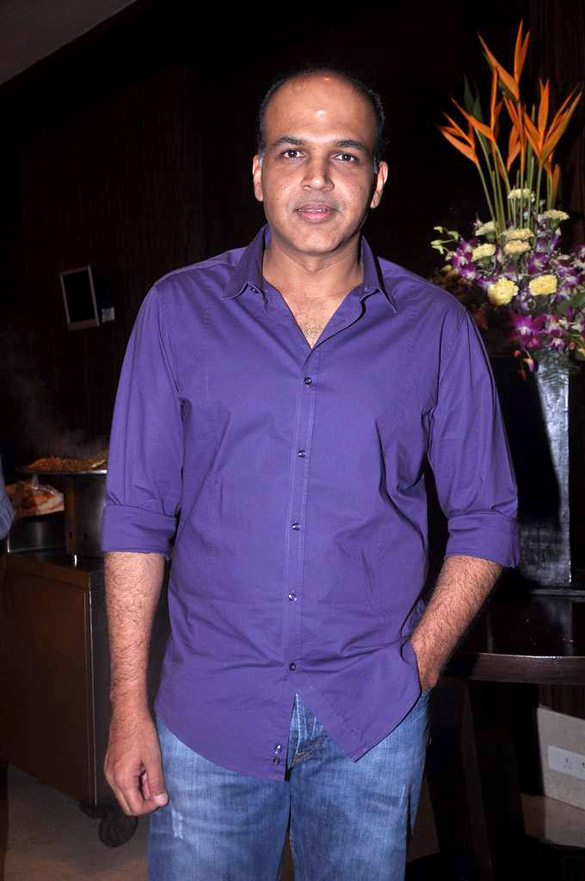
Ashutosh Gowariker, Chairman of jury

In addition to the Golden Peacock for best film, the Jury decides the winners in the Best Director, Best Actor (Male), Best Actor (Female) and Special Jury Prize categories. The following are the members of the International Jury:

- Ashutosh Gowariker, Indian filmmaker, Chairperson
- Anthony Chen, Singaporean writer-director
- Elizabeth Karlsen, American–British film producer
- Fran Borgia, Spanish producer
- Jill Bilcock, Australian editor

=== Feature film jury ===
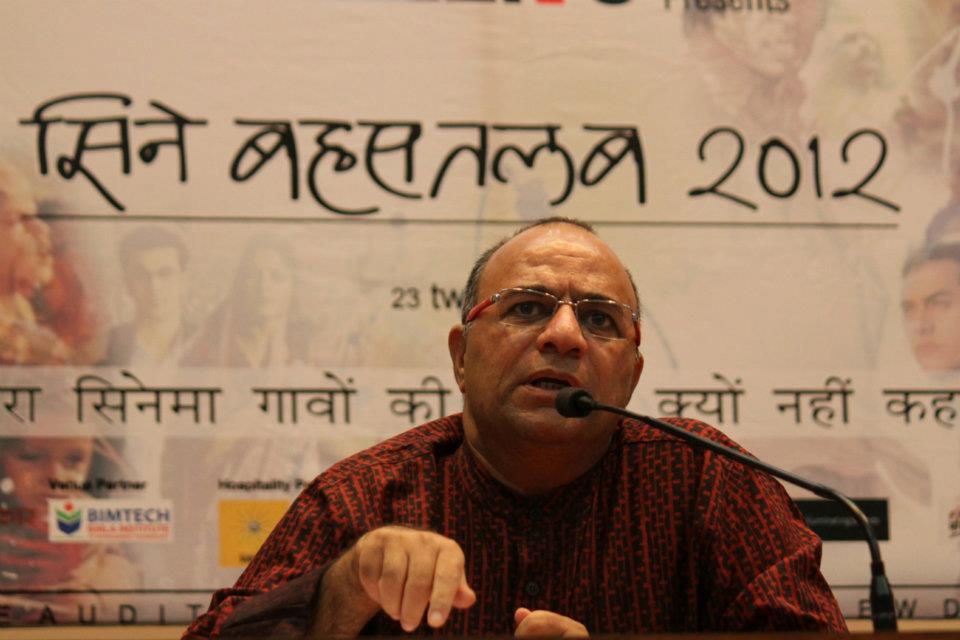
Chandra Prakash Dwivedi, Chairman of jury

The Feature Film Jury is headed by Film Director, Actor and Screenwriter Chandra Prakash Dwivedi. The Feature Jury constituted of twelve Members collectively representing the diverse Indian film fraternity.

- Manoj Joshi, Indian film, stage and television actor
- Susmita Mukherjee, Actor
- Himansu Sekhar Khatua, Film Director
- Oinam Gautam Singh, Film Director
- Ashuu Trikha, Film Director
- S.M. Patil, Film Director and Writer
- Neelaabh Kaul, Cinematographer and Film Director
- Susant Misra, Film Director
- Arun Kumar Bose, Ex HOD of Prasad Institute and Sound Engineer
- Ratnottama Sengupta, Writer and Editor
- Sameer Hanchate, Film Director
- Priya Krishnaswamy, Film Director

=== Non-feature film jury ===
The Jury headed by Documentary and Wildlife film director Subbiah Nallamuthu, has following six member:

- Rajnikant Acharya, Producer and Film Director
- Ronel Haobam, Film Director
- Usha Deshpande, Film Director and Producer
- Vandana Kohli, Film Director and Writer
- Mithunchandra Chaudhari, Film Director
- Shalini Shah, filmmaker

=== ICFT UNESCO Gandhi Medal jury ===
- Isabelle Danel, France, Honorary President of FIPRESCI - International Federation of Film Critics
- Serge Michel, Vice President of CICT-ICFT
- Maria Cristina Iglesias, former head of UNESCO's Cultural Sector Programme
- Ahmed Bedjaoui, Artistic Director of the Algiers International Film Festival
- Xueyan Hun, Platform for Creativity and Innovation, CICT-ICFT youth branch

=== 75 Creative Minds of Tomorrow ===
==== Grand Jury ====
- A. Sreekar Prasad, Editor
- Deepak Singh, director
- Charuvi Agrawal, Indian painter, sculptor, animator, visual and installation artist
- Shankar Mahadevan, composer
- Samrat Chakraborty, Writing
- Ravi Varman, cinematographer
- Mona Shetty, Voice over
- Shreya Ghoshal, Playback Singer
- Sreelekha Mukherjee, Actor
- Sheetal Sharma, costume designer

=== Web Series jury ===
- Madhur Bhandarkar, Indian film director, script writer, and producer – Chairperson
- Harish Shankar, Indian film director and screenwriter
- Rupali Ganguly, Indian actress
- Krishna Hebbale, actor

== Official selection ==
Sections

- International competition
- Best Debut Feature Film of a Director
- Indian Panorama
  - Feature films
  - Mainstream Cinema Section
  - Non-feature films
- Best Debut Director of Indian Feature Film
- ICFT UNESCO Gandhi Medal
- Best Web Series Award
- From The Festivals – 2024
- Docu–Montage
- Experimental Films – 2024
- Macabre Dreams
- Accolades – 2024
- Cinema of the World
- Restored classics
- UNICEF @ IFFI
- Mission Life
- BFI@IFFI
- From The Consulates

=== Opening and closing films ===
Year	English title	Original title	Director(s)	Production countrie(s)
Opening films
2024	Better Man		Michael Gracey	Australia, United States
Indian Panorama feature film
2024	Swatantrya Veer Savarkar		Randeep Hooda	India
Indian Panorama non-feature film
2024	Ghar Jaisa Kuch		Harsh Sangani	India
Closing film
2024	Dry Season	Sucho	Bohdan Sláma	Czech Republic, Germany, Slovakia

=== International competition ===
15 international and Indian fiction feature films competed for the Golden Peacock Award.

Highlighted title indicates award winner

English title	Original title	Director(s)	Production countrie(s)
Fear and Trembling		Manijeh Hekmat and Faeze Azizkhani	Iran
Gulizar		Belkis Bayrak	Turkey
Holy Cow	Vingt Dieux	Louise Courvoisier	France
I'm Nevenka	Soy Nevenka	Icíar Bollaín	Spain
Panopticon		George Sikharulidze	Georgia, France, Italy, Romania
Pierce	刺心切骨	Nelicia Low	Singapore, Taiwan, Poland
Red Path	Les Enfants rouges	Lotfi Achour	Tunisia
Shepherds	Berger	Sophie Deraspe	Canada, France
The New Year That Never Came	Anul Nou care n-a fost	Bogdan Mureșanu	Romania
Toxic	Akiplėša	Saulė Bliuvaitė	Lithuania
Waves	Vlny	Jiří Mádl	Czech Republic, Slovakia
Who Do I Belong To	Là d’où l’on vient	Meryam Joobeur	Tunisia, Canada, France, Norway, Qatar, Saudi Arabia
The Goat Life	Aadujeevitham	Blessy	India
Article 370		Aditya Suhas Jambhale	India
Raavsaheb		Nikhil Mahajan	India

=== Best Debut Feature Film of a Director ===
This competition category is a platform for upcoming filmmakers from India and abroad and win the Best Debut Director Award. Seven debut films were nominated in this category.

Highlighted title indicates award winner

English title	Original title	Director(s)	Production countrie(s)
Betânia		Marcelo Botta	Brazil
Bound in Heaven	Kun bang shang tian tang	Huo Xin	China
Bring Them Down		Christopher Andrews	Ireland, Belgium
Familiar Touch		Sarah Friedland	United States
To a Land Unknown		Mahdi Fleifel	United Kingdom, France, Germany, Netherlands, Greece, Qatar, Saudi Arabia, Palestine
Gypsy		Shashi Chandrakant Khandare	India
35 Chinna Katha Kaadu		Nanda Kishore Emani	India

=== Best Web Series OTT ===
This competition category is a platform for upcoming web series makers from India and win the Best Web Series Award.

English title	Original title	Director(s)	Network
Scam 2003		Hansal Mehta	SonyLIV
Jamanapaar		Prashant Bhagia	Amazon miniTV
Ayali		Muthukumar	ZEE5
Kota Factory		Raghav Subbu	Netflix
Jubilee		Vikramaditya Motwane	Amazon Prime Video
Kohrra		Randeep Jha	Netflix
The Railway Men		Shiv Rawail	Netflix
Kaala Paani		Sameer Saxena	Netflix
Dahaad		Reema Kagti	Amazon Prime Video
Lampan		Nipun Dharmadhikari	SonyLIV

=== Indian Panorama ===
In Indian Panorama feature and non-feature films of cinematic, thematic, and aesthetic excellence are selected for the promotion of film art through the non-profit screening of these films under different categories.

==== Feature films ====
Title of the Film	Language	Director(s)	Producer(s)
Swatantrya Veer Savarkar	Hindi	Randeep Hooda	Randeep Hooda Films
Kerebete	Kannada	Rajguru B	Janamana Cinemas
Venkya	Kannada	Sagar Puranik	
Juiphool	Assamese	Jadumoni Dutta	
Mahavatar Narsimha	Hindi	Ashwin Kumar	
Jigarthanda DoubleX	Tamil	Karthik Subbaraj	Stone Bench Creations
The Goat Life	Malayalam	Blessy	Visual Romance
Article 370	Hindi	Aditya Suhas Jambhale	B62 Studios, Jio Studios
Gypsy	Marathi	Shashi Chandrakant Khandare	Bolpat Nirmitee
Srikanth	Hindi	Tushar Hiranandani	Chalk and Cheese Films
Aamar Boss	Bengali	Shiboprosad Mukherjee, Nandita Roy	Windows
Bramayugam	Malayalam	Rahul Sadasivan	Night Shift Studios
35 Chinna Katha Kaadu	Telugu	Nanda Kishore Emani	Suresh Productions
Rador Pakhi	Assamese	Bobby Sarma Baruah	
Gharat Ganpati	Marathi	Navjyot Narendra Bandiwadekar	Navigns Studio
Raavsaaheb	Marathi	Nikhil Mahajan	Planet Marathi, Blue Drop Films
Level Cross	Malayalam	Arfaz Ayub	Abhishek Films
Karken	Galo	Nending Loder	
Bhootpori	Bengali	Soukarya Ghosal	Surinder Films
Onko Ki Kothin	Bengali	Saurav Palodhi	

==== Mainstream Cinema Section ====
Title of the Film	Language	Director(s)	Producer(s)
Karkhanu	Gujarati	Rushabh Thanki	
12th Fail	Hindi	Vidhu Vinod Chopra	Vinod Chopra Films
Manjummel Boys	Malayalam	Chidambaram S. Poduval	Parava Films
Swargarath	Assamese	Rajesh Bhuyan	AM Television
Kalki 2898 AD	Telugu	Nag Ashwin	Vyjayanthi Movies

==== Non-feature Films ====
20 Non-feature films selected in the 'Indian Panorama' are as follows:

Title of the Film	Language	Director(s)
6-A Akash Ganga	Hindi	Nirmal Chander
Amar Aaj Marega	Hindi	Rajat Kariya
Amma's Pride	Tamil	Shiva Krish
Bahi – Tracing My Ancestors	Hindi	Rachita Gorowala
Ballad of the Mountain	Hindi	Tarun Jain
Battoo Ka Bulbula	Hariyanvi	Akshay Bhardwaj
Chanchisoa	Garo	Elvachisa Ch Sangma, Dipankar Das
Flanders Di Zameen Vich	Punjabi	Sachin
Ghar Jaisa Kuch (Opening film)	Ladakhi	Harsh Sangani
Ghode Ki Sawari	Hindi	Debjani Mukherjee
Google Matrimony	English	Abhinav Athrey
Main Nida	Hindi	Atul Pandey
Mo Bou, Mo Gaan	Oriya	Subash Sahoo
Monihara	Bengali	Subhadeep Biswas
P for Paparazzi	Hindi	Divya Kharnare
Pillars of Progress: The Epic Story of Delhi Metro	English	Satish Pande
Praan Pratishtha	Marathi	Pankaj Sonawane
Roti Koon Banasi?	Rajasthani	Chandan Singh
Saavat	Konkani	Shivam Harmalkar, Santosh Shetkar
Sivantha Mann	Tamil	Infant

=== Best Debut Director of Indian Feature Film ===
Five Debut Feature Films by Indian Directors will be showcased, that highlight new perspectives, diverse narratives, and innovative cinematic styles from across India. This competition category is a platform for upcoming filmmakers from India and win the Best Debut Director Award.

Title of the Film	Language	Director(s)
Boong	Manipuri	Lakshmipriya Devi
Gharat Ganpati	Marathi	Navjyot Bandiwadekar
Mikka Bannada Hakki (Bird of a Different Feather)	Kannada	Manohara K
Razakar	Telugu	Yata Satyanarayana
Thanupp (The Cold)	Malayalam	Ragesh Narayanan

=== ICFT UNESCO Gandhi Medal ===
Ten films have been shortlisted for the ICFT UNESCO Gandhi Medal, each representing different regions, cultures, and genres, yet united by their commitment to Gandhian principles.

Highlighted title indicates award winner

English title	Original title	Director(s)	Production countrie(s)
Crossing	Geçiş	Levan Akin	Sweden, Denmark, France, Turkey, Georgia
For Rana		Iman Yazdi	Iran
Lesson Learned		Bálint Szimler	Hungary
Meeting with Pol Pot	Rendez-vous avec Pol Pot	Rithy Panh	France, Cambodia, Taiwan, Qatar, Turkey
Satu - Year of the Rabbit		Joshua Trigg	Laos, United Kingdom
Transamazonia		Pia Marais	Brazil, France, Germany, Switzerland, Taiwan
Unsinkable	Synkefri	Christian Andersen	Denmark
Aamar Boss		Nandita Roy, Shiboprosad Mukherjee	India
Juiphool		Jadumoni Dutta	India
Srikanth		Tushar Hiranandani	India

=== From The Festivals – 2024 ===
English title	Original title	Director(s)	Production countrie(s)
Black Dog	狗陣	Guan Hu	China
The Empire	L'Empire	Bruno Dumont	France, Germany, Italy, Belgium, Portugal
The End		Joshua Oppenheimer	Denmark, United Kingdom
Flathead		Jaydon Martin	Australia
Grand Tour		Miguel Gomes	Portugal, Italy, France
The Great Yawn of History	Khamyazeye bozorg	Aliyar Rasti	Iran
Happy Holidays	ينعاد عليكو	Scandar Copti	Palestine, Germany, France, Italy, Qatar
Loveable	Elskling	Lilja Ingolfsdottir	Norway
Moon	Mond	Kurdwin Ayub	Austria
Norah	نورة	Tawfik Alzaidi	Saudi Arabia
Pepe		Nelson Carlo De Los Santos Arias	Dominican Republic, Namibia, Germany, France
Phantosmia		Lav Diaz	Philippines
The Second Act	Le Deuxième Acte	Quentin Dupieux	France
Steppenwolf		Adilkhan Yerzhanov	Kazakhstan
Simon of the Mountain	Simon de la montaña	Federico Luis	Argentina, Chile, Uruguay
The Quiet Son	Jouer Avec le Feu	Delphine and Muriel Coulin	France

=== Docu–Montage ===
This section comprises documentaries & docu-drama.

English title	Original title	Director(s)	Production countrie(s)
Afternoons of Solitude	Tardes de soledad	Albert Serra	Spain, Portugal, France
Black Box Diaries		Shiori Itō	Japan, United States, United Kingdom
Cinema Laika		Veljko Vidak	Finland
Dahomey		Mati Diop	France, Senegal, Benin
Gaucho Gaucho	Michael Dweck, Gregory Kershaw	United States, Argentina	
Higher than Acidic Clouds	Balatar az abrhaye asidi	Ali Asgari	Iran
Mistress Dispeller		Elizabeth Lo	China, United States
Youth (Hard Times)	青春（苦）	Wang Bing	France, Luxembourg, Netherlands
Youth (Homecoming)	青春（归）	Wang Bing	France, Luxembourg, Netherlands

=== Experimental Films – 2024 ===
English title	Original title	Director(s)	Production countrie(s)
Animalia Paradoxa		Niles Atallah	Chile
Eight Postcards from Utopia	Opt ilustrate din lumea ideală	Radu Jude, Christian Ferencz-Flatz	Romania
Godsterminal		Georg Tiller	Sweden
Sanatorium Under the Sign of the Hourglass		Brothers Quay	United Kingdom, Poland, Germany
Telepathic Letters	Cartas Telepáticas	Edgar Pêra	Portugal
The Rim	La Parra	Alberto Gracia	Spain

=== Accolades – 2024 ===
English title	Original title	Director(s)	Production countrie(s)
All We Imagine as Light		Payal Kapadia	France, India, Netherlands, Luxembourg, Italy
The Room Next Door	La habitación de al lado	Pedro Almodóvar	Spain

=== Macabre Dreams ===
English title	Original title	Director(s)	Production countrie(s)
Frewaka	Fréwaka	Aislinn Clarke	Ireland
Sofia, the Possession	Tu Sangre	Guillermo Barreira	Spain
The Wailing	El llanto	Pedro Martín Calero	Spain, France, Argentina
Working Class Goes to Hell	Radnička Klasa Ide U Pakao	Mladen Djordjevic	Serbia, Greece, Bulgaria, Montenegro, Croatia, Romania

=== Cinema of the World ===
English title	Original title	Director(s)	Production countrie(s)
A Postcard from Rome	Pastkarte no Romas	Elza Gauja	Latvia
A Sudden Glimpse to Deeper Things		Mark Cousins	United Kingdom
Aïcha		Mehdi Barsaoui	Tunisia, France, Italy, Saudi Arabia, Qatar
Algiers		Chakib Taleb-Bendiab	Algeria, Tunisia, France, Canada
All Shall Be Well	從今以後	Ray Yeung	Hong Kong
American Warrior		Gustavo Martin Benites	United States
Architecton		Victor Kossakovsky	Germany, France, United States
As the River Goes By	水东游	Charles Hu	China
Ayse		Necmi Sancak	Turkey
Barren		Mansour Vosoughi	Iran
Bassima's Womb	Le ventre de Bassima	Babek Aliassa	Canada
Bila Burba		Duiren Wagua	Panama
They Call Me the Panzer	Me dicen el Panzer	Rodrigo Quintero Arauz	Panama
Bassima's Womb	Le ventre de Bassima	Babek Aliassa	Canada
Bitter Gold	Oro Amargo	Juan Olea	Chile, Germany, Mexico, Uruguay
Borrowed Time		Choy Ji	China
Brief History of a Family	家庭简史	Lin Jianjie	China, Denmark
Luna Park		Florenc Papas	Albania, Italy, Greece, Croatia, Kosova
The Tower of Strength	Obraz	Nikola Vukčević	Montenegro, Serbia, Croatia, Germany
When Santa Was a Communist	Djed Mraz u Bosni	Emir Kapetanovic	Bosnia and Herzegovina, Croatia, Serbia

=== Restored classics ===
Year	English title	Original title	Director(s)	Production countrie(s)
1991	Bobo		Narine Mkrtchyan, Arsen Azatian	Armenia
1971	Four Nights of a Dreamer	Quatre nuits d'un rêveur	Robert Bresson	France, Italy
1993	Moving	お引越し	Shinji Sōmai	Japan

=== UNICEF @ IFFI ===
Year	English title	Original title	Director(s)	Production countrie(s)
2024	Through Rocks and Clouds	Raíz	Franco García Becerra	Peru, Chile
2024	The Rebels	Мятежники	Vladimir Alenikov	Russia
2024	Clarice's Dream	O Sonho De Clarice	Guto Bicalho, Fernando Gutierrez	Brazil
1956	Kabuliwala		Tapan Sinha	India

=== Rising Stars ===
English title	Original title	Director(s)	Production countrie(s)
Crickets, It's Your Turn	Shegirtkeler, Vash Vyhod	Olga Korotko	France, Kazakhstan
Cu Li Never Cries	Cu Li Không Bao Giờ Khóc	Phạm Ngọc Lân	Vietnam, Singapore, France, Philippines, Norway
Else		Thibault Emin	France, Belgium
Hunters on a White Field	Jakt På Ett Vitt Fält	Sarah Gyllenstierna	Sweden
Hunting Daze	Jour De Chasse	Annick Blanc	Canada
Lilies Not for Me		Will Seefried	United States, United Kingdom, France, South Africa
Memories of a Burning Body	Memorias de un cuerpo que arde	Antonella Sudasassi Furniss	Costa Rica, Spain

=== Mission Life ===
Year	English title	Original title	Director(s)	Production countrie(s)
2024	Black Butterflies	Mariposas Negras	David Baute	Spain, Panama
2024	Eastern Anthems	Mariposas Negras	Matthew Wolkow, Jean-Jacques Martinod	Canada, United States, Ecuador

=== BFI @ IFFI ===
English title	Original title	Director(s)	Production countrie(s)
Bring Them Down		Christopher Andrews	Ireland, United Kingdom, Belgium
The Draughtsman's Contract		Peter Greenaway	United Kingdom
In Camera		Naqqash Khalid	United Kingdom
Layla		Amrou Al-Kadhi	United Kingdom
Sky Peals		Moin Hussain	United Kingdom

=== From The Consulates ===
English title	Original title	Director(s)	Production countrie(s)
So Close to the Clouds	Tan cerca de las nubes	Manuel Cañibe	Mexico
The Dark Castle		Kirill Kuzin	Belarus, Russia
A Fragile Flower	Doa hoa mong manh	Mai Thu Huyền	Vietnam, USA
Jíkuri:Journey to the Land of the Tarahumara		Federico Cecchetti	México, USA, France

=== Centennials Restored Classics NFDC – NFAI ===
As part of centenary celebrations of Raj Kapoor, Mohammed Rafi, Tapan Sinha and Akkineni Nageswara Rao, each of their film restored by National Film Development Corporation of India (NFDC), as part of National Film Heritage Mission, is screened.

Year	Title of the Film	Language	Personality
1951	Awaara	Hindustani	Raj Kapoor
1953	Devadasu	Telugu	Akkineni Nageswara Rao
1961	Hum Dono	Hindi	Mohammed Rafi
1975	Harmonium	Bengali	Tapan Sinha

=== Gala Premiere ===
Films and television shows will have their premiere in this segment.

Title	Director(s)	Language
The Piano Lesson	Malcolm Washington	English
The Rana Daggubati Show	Sukhvinder Singh Chauhan	Telugu
Zero Se Restart	Jaskunwar Singh Kohli	Hindi
Snow Flower	Gajendra Ahire	Marathi
Saali Mohabbat	Tisca Chopra	Hindi
Mrs.	Arati Kadav	Hindi
Vikkatakavi	Pradeep Maddali	Telugu
Pune Highway	Rahul da Cunha	Hindi
Hazar Vela Sholay Pahelila Manus	Hrishikesh Gupte	Marathi
Kannappa (Showcase)	Mukesh Kumar Singh	Telugu
The Mehta Boys	Boman Irani	Hindi
Jab Khuli Kitaab	Saurabh Shukla	Hindi
Hisaab Barabar	Ashwni Dhir	Hindi
Pharma	P. R. Arun	Malayalam
Headhunting To Beatboxing	Rohit Gupta	English

== Country of focus ==
Australia has been nominated as the "Country of Focus" for the festival. A selected lineup of seven Australian films, spanning a variety of genres will be featured in the festival. From dramas and impactful documentaries to visually captivating thrillers and uplifting comedies, these films will highlight Australia's cultural identity, showcasing an array of stories from both indigenous and modern communities.

Title	Original title	Director
Addition		Marcelle Lunam
Force of Nature: The Dry 2		Robert Connolly
In Vitro		Will Howarth, Tom McKeith
Runt		John Sheedy
The Moogai		Jon Bell
The Rooster		Mark Leonard Winter
The Speedway Murders		Adam Kamien, Luke Rynderman
Rising up at Night	Tongo Saa	Nelson Makengo (Democratic Republic of the Congo, Belgium, Germany, Burkina Faso, Qatar)

== Awards and winners ==
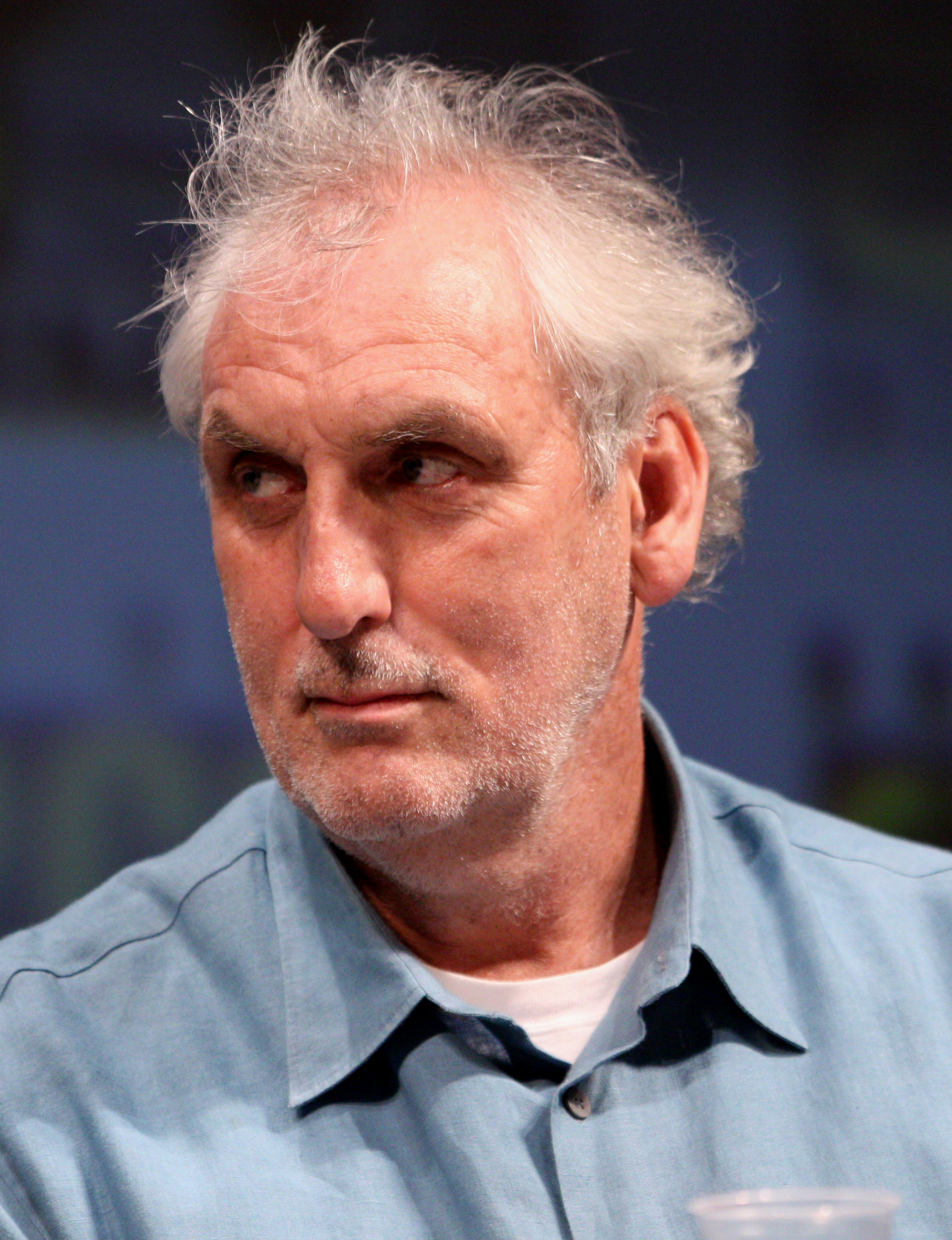
Phillip Noyce, recipient of Satyajit Ray Lifetime Achievement Award

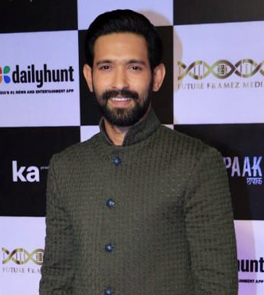
Vikrant Massey Recipient of Indian Film Personality of the Year Award

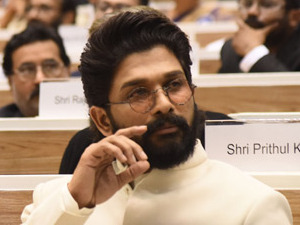
Allu Arjun Recipient of Special Recognition for Contribution to Bharatiya Cinema Award

- Golden Peacock (Best Film): Toxic by Saulė Bliuvaitė, Lithuania
- Best Director: Bogdan Mureșanu, for The New Year That Never Came, Romania
- Best Actor: Clément Favreau for Holy Cow, France
- Best Actress: Vesta Matulyte and Vilma Raubaitė for Toxic
- Best Debut Film of a Director: Familiar Touch by Sarah Friedland, United States
- Special Jury Award: Holy Cow by Louise Courvoisier, France
- ICFT UNESCO Gandhi Medal: Crossing by Levan Akin, Sweden
- Best Debut Director of Indian Feature Film: Gharat Ganpati, Navjyot Bandiwadekar, Marathi
- Best Web Series Award: Lampan by Nipun Avinash
- Satyajit Ray Lifetime Achievement Award: Phillip Noyce, Australia
- Indian Film Personality of the Year Award: Vikrant Massey
- Special Recognition for Contribution to Bharatiya Cinema Award: Allu Arjun

== See also ==
- List of film festivals in India
- 53rd International Film Festival of India
