= 72 Hoorain =

2023 Hindi Film

- Threatical release poster
- Directed by: Sanjay Puran Singh Chauhan
- Written by: Anil Pandey
- Produced by: Gulab Singh Tanwar; Ashoke Pandit; Kiran Dagar; Anirudh Tanwar
- Starring: Saru Maini; Aamir Bashir; Pavan Malhotra; Rasheed Naz; Ashok Pathak; Namrata Dixit; Mukesh Agrohari; Bhavani Bashir Yasir; Narottam Bain; Vijay Sanap
- Cinematography: Chirantan Das
- Edited by: Sanjay Puran Singh Chauhan; Sandeep Singh Bajeli Sandeep Beera
- Production companies: Saarthie Entertainment; Aliens Pictures
- Release dates: November 2019 (IFFI); 7 July 2023
- Running time: 80 minutes
- Country: India
- Language: Hindi

72 Hoorain is a 2019 Indian Hindi-language drama film written and directed by Sanjay Puran Singh Chauhan. The film had a delayed theatrical release in India on July 7, 2023. It received mixed reviews and underwhelmed at the box office.

The film premiered at the 50th IFFI 2019, where it received standing ovation, and won the ICFT-UNESCO Gandhi Medal-Special Mention for Best Film on peace and inter-cultural dialogue; and Best Direction - Feature Film at the 67th National Film Awards 2021.

== Plot ==
The film follows two fedayeens Hakim and Bilal, who get killed after committing a suicide bombing at the Gateway of India in Mumbai. They find themselves in a purgatory state, waiting to enter heaven. They are told that they will be rewarded with 72 virgins, known as the "Houri". However, as they wait, they begin to have doubts about the existence of the Hoorain and the afterlife. They also start to question the reasons why they were trapped in a deadly illusion of 72 virgins, and embark on a path of destruction, ultimately meeting a gruesome fate.

== Cast ==
- Saru Maini as Meher
- Pavan Malhotra as Terrorist Hakim Ali
- Aamir Bashir as Terrorist Bilal Ahmed
- Rasheed Naz as Maulvi, who discusses the concept of Houri
- Bhavani Bashir Yasir as Maulvi
- Narottam Bain

== Release ==
72 Hoorain was released in English and 10 other Indian languages – Assamese, Bengali, Bhojpuri, Kannada, Kashmiri, Malayalam, Marathi, Punjabi, Tamil, and Telugu.

=== CBFC rating ===
The filmmakers objected to CBFC's denial of certification to the trailer of the film. However, the Censor Board in a released press note said "Misleading reports are being circulated in certain sections of media that a film and its trailer titled 'Bahattar Hoorain (72 Hoorain)' has been refused certification by Central Board of Film Certification. Contrary to the reports, CBFC states that the film 'Bahattar Hoorain (72 Hoorain)' was granted 'A' certification and the certificate was issued on 4-10-2019."

== Reception ==
=== Box office ===
72 Hoorain hit screens on July 7, generating buzz but not significantly impacting ticketing on its opening day. It collected Rs. 0.35 crore with the overall occupancy of 8.98%. On Day 2, the film earned Rs. 0.45 crore, reaching a total collection of Rs. 0.80 crore, and it had a 11.60% occupancy in the Hindi belt. On day 3, the film grossed Rs. 1 crore, minted 47 lakh, and had a 12.35% occupancy in the Hindi box office. On Day 4 it earned 25 lakh.

=== Critical response ===
72 Hoorain received mixed reviews.

The Outlook rated the film 4/5 and stated, "It is all the more necessary that audiences hardwired to entertainment also watch this film, for it exposes the nexus between religion and terrorism brilliantly, and brings the debate over religious fanaticism to the centrestage." Abhishek Srivastava of The Times of India rated the film 3.5/5 and cited, "This thought-provoking film reiterates that extremism has no positives." Anuj Kumar of The Hindu wrote, "Nothing controversial about this cautionary tale. Chauhan is razor-sharp in his focus and delivers a strong and timely message. It serves as a wake-up call."

== Accolades ==
50th International Film Festival of India

- UNESCO Gandhi Medal - Special Mention for Best Film on peace and inter-cultural dialogue

67th National Film Awards

- Best Direction - Feature Film
