= List of films set in Lahore =

Lahore is the core of Pakistan's media and arts scene. Pakistan's film industry is based in the city and is called Lollywood. Many films are filmed in Lahore and the city has some of the oldest film studios in the country.

Films which have been shot in, or have plots based in the city of Lahore include:

- Awarapan
- Bhowani Junction
- Bol
- Daughters of Today
- Dil Bole Hadippa!
- Donkey in Lahore
- Earth
- Gadar: Ek Prem Katha
- Henna
- Kalank
- Khuda Kay Liye
- Lahore
- Lahore Confidential
- Larki Punjaban
- Mughal-e-Azam
- Pinjar
- The Reluctant Fundamentalist
- Salakhain
- Shararat
- Tere Pyar Mein
- Teri Yaad
- Veer-Zaara
- Virsa
