= Particles (film) =

2019 film

- Film poster
- French: Les Particules
- Directed by: Blaise Harrison
- Written by: Blaise Harrison
- Produced by: Estelle Fialon; Lionel Baier
- Starring: Thomas Daloz; Néa Lueders
- Music by: Martin Caraux
- Release dates: 22 May 2019 (Cannes); 5 June 2019 (France)
- Running time: 98 minutes
- Countries: France; Switzerland
- Language: French

Particles (French: Les Particules) is a 2019 French-Swiss co-produced drama film directed by Blaise Harrison. It was screened in the Directors' Fortnight section at the 2019 Cannes Film Festival and was nominated for the camera d'Or. The film won the Golden Peacock (Best Film) at the 50th International Film Festival of India.

== Cast ==
- Thomas Daloz as P.A.
- Néa Lueders as Roshine
- Salvatore Ferro as Mérou
- Léo Couilfort as Cole
- Nicolas Marcant as JB
