= 50th International Film Festival of India =

Indian film festival in 2019

- Opening film: Despite the Fog
- Closing film: Marghe and Her Mother
- Location: Goa, India
- Founded: 1952
- Awards: Golden Peacock: (Particles); Lifetime Achievement Award: (Isabelle Hupert)
- Hosted by: Sonali Kulkarni; Kunal Kapoor; Karan Johar
- Festival date: 20–28 November 2019
- Website: iffigoa.org

International Film Festival of India
- 51st 49th

The 50th International Film Festival of India was held from 20 to 28 November 2019 in Goa. Russia was the country of focus at this edition of the festival with eight Russian-language films being screened.

== Jury ==
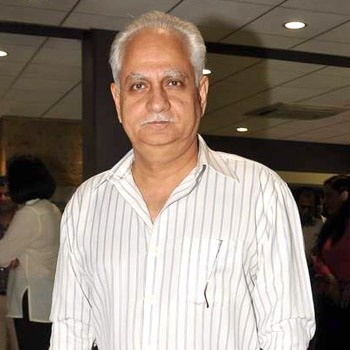
Ramesh Sippy, Jury member

- John Bailey, Chairperson
- Robin Campillo, French screenwriter, editor and film director
- Zhang Yang, Chinese film director, screenwriter
- Lynne Ramsay, Scottish film director, writer, producer, and cinematographer
- Ramesh Sippy, Indian director

== Winners ==
- Golden Peacock (Best Film): Particles by Blaise Harrison
- IFFI Best Director Award: Lijo Jose Pellissery for Jallikattu
- IFFI Best Debut Director Award: Amin Sidi-Boumédiène for Abou Leila and Marius Olteanu for Monsters.
- IFFI Best Actor Award (Male): Seu Jorge for Marighella
- IFFI Best Actor Award (Female): Usha Jadhav for Mai Ghat : Crime No 103/2015
- Silver Peacock Special Jury Award: Pema Tseden for Balloon
- Special Mention: Hellaro by Abhishek Shah

== Special awards ==
- Life Time Achievement Award - Isabelle Hupert
- ICFT UNESCO Gandhi Medal: Riccardo Salvetti for Rwanda
- ICFT UNESCO Gandhi Medal (Special mention): Sanjay Puran Singh for Bahattar Hoorain (72 Hoorain)
- IFFI Golden Jubilee ICON Award: Rajinikanth

== Official Selections ==
=== Opening Film ===
- Despite the Fog (Italy)

=== Closing Film ===
- Marghe and Her Mother (Italy)

== See also ==
- List of film festivals in India
- 52nd International Film Festival of India
