= Dry Season (2024 film) =

- Directed by: Bohdan Sláma
- Produced by: Pavel Strnad; Petr Oukropec
- Starring: Marek Daniel; Martin Pechlát
- Cinematography: Diviš Marek
- Music by: Jakub Kudláč
- Distributed by: Bontonfilm
- Release date: 15 February 2024
- Running time: 112 minutes
- Countries: Czech Republic; Germany; Slovakia
- Language: Czech

Dry Season (Czech: Sucho) is a 2024 Czech drama film directed by Bohdan Sláma. The film was co-produced by the company Negativ, Czech Television, the German company 42film and the Slovak company Artillery with the support of the State Cinematography Fund, the South Moravian Film Foundation Fund, the Slovak Audiovisual Fund and the German Mitteldeutsche Medienförderung.

It was released in theaters on February 15, 2024 by Bontonfilm. It screened on 28 November 2024 as closing film of the 55th International Film Festival of India.

== Plot ==
The film is set in South Moravian location known as Moravian Tuscany. It focuses on a conflict between two family clans led by dominant fathers. Josef forces his family to an alternate way of life in harmony and leads fight against local Agribusiness owned by Viktor. Josef's family suffers as he prohibits children from computers, mobile phones and the Internet while his wife Eva has to provide for family and must works at the local Agribusiness her husband fights against. Viktor on the other hand considers land as a tool for making a profit and doesn't care about ecological impact and long-term sustainability. Viktor's son Míra, who has been living with his mother in Prague for over a year arrives to Viktor's place for the holidays. Viktor would like to involve Míra in the management of the Agribusiness but Míra refuses because he does not agree with her father's approach. Míra becomes close to Josef's daughter Žofka, but their relationship is turbulent, especially when both teenagers start to stand up against their domineering fathers. Viktor tries to convince Míra not to meet with Žofka, while Josef does not like to see Žofka break free from his influence. When Míra and Žofka decide to run away from the village together, it seems that this will be the best solution for their situation.

== Cast ==
- Marek Daniel as Viktor
- Martin Pechlát as Josef
- Magdaléna Borová as Eva
- Tomas Sean Pšenička as Míra
- Dorota Šlajerová as Žofka
- Bolek Polívka as Viktor's father
- Gabriela Míčová
- Judit Pecháček
- Marek Taclík

== Production ==
Shooting took place in 2022 mostly in South Moravia. Filming locations include Krumvíř, Šardice and other locations of Moravian Tuscany. Beside that some parts were filmed in Prague and Berlin.
