= Sunpat (film) =

- Directed by: Rahul Rawat
- Written by: Rahul Rawat; Anuj Bisht
- Cinematography: Veeru Singh Baghel
- Edited by: Rahul Rawat; Rohit Rawat
- Music by: Ishan Dobhal (Pandavaas)
- Distributed by: Uttarakhand Film Company
- Release date: 20 November 2021 (Uttarakhand)
- Country: India
- Language: Garhwali

Sunpat is an Indian film in Garhwali, a language from Uttarakhand.

The film, directed by Rahul Rawat, is the first film from Uttarakhand to be screened at the International Film Festival of India. It was selected under the panorama section for the 52nd International Film Festival of India held at Goa, where it had its world premiere on 20 November 2021.
