= Lahore (2010 film) =

2010 Indian Hindi sports film

- Directed by: Sanjay Puran Singh Chauhan
- Written by: Sanjay Puran Singh Chauhan; Piyush Mishra
- Produced by: Vivek Khatkar
- Starring: Aanaahad; Shraddha Das; Farooq Sheikh; Nafisa Ali; Sabyasachi Chakrabarty
- Cinematography: Neelabh Kaul; Rolf Dekens
- Edited by: Sandeep Singh Bajeli; Hidi Lai
- Music by: M. M. Kreem; Wayne Sharpe
- Production company: Sai Om Films Private Limited
- Distributed by: Warner Bros. Pictures
- Release date: 19 March 2010
- Running time: 126 minutes
- Country: India
- Language: Hindi

Lahore is a 2010 Indian Hindi-language sports film that was released on 19 March 2010. It was directed by Sanjay Puran Singh Chauhan and produced by Vivek Khatkar, with Sai Om Films Pvt. Ltd.'s, and distributed by Warner Bros. Pictures. It is loosely based on the 1989 American martial arts film Best of the Best.

The film stars debutants Aanaahad and Shraddha Das in lead roles and has veteran actors like Farooq Shaikh, Nafisa Ali, Nirmal Pandey, Sushant Singh, Sabyasachi Chakrabarty, Saurabh Shukla, Ashish Vidyarthi, Kelly Dorji, Mukesh Rishi, Jeeva, and Shraddha Nigam in key roles.

== Plot ==
An Indian kickboxer defeats a Pakistani kickboxer in an Asian kickboxing tournament. The event ends in tragedy due to the Pakistani players' intemperance. The peace process initiated by the two countries struggles to gain momentum. This is especially true when the Indian hero's brother is determined to avenge his family and country during a second international bout that is being held in Lahore.

== Cast ==
- Aanaahad as Veerender Singh
- Shraddha Das as Ida
- Farooq Shaikh as S K Rao
- Nafisa Ali as Amma
- Sushant Singh as Dheeru
- Shraddha Nigam as Neela Chaudhary
- Mukesh Rishi as Noor Mohammad
- Sabyasachi Chakrabarty as Sikandar Hyaat Khan
- Kelly Dorji as Gajanan
- Jeeva as Kunjal Bhaskar Reddy
- Pramod Mouthu as Shahnawaz Qureshi
- Nirmal Pandey as Anwar Shaikh
- Saurabh Shukla as Madhav Suri
- Ashish Vidyarthi as Mohd. Akhtar
- Ram Awana as Iqbal Khan
- Karate Raja as C. Subramaniam

== Production ==
The film was shot in Delhi, Mumbai, Lahore, Hyderabad, Ladakh, Lonavala, Malaysia, Bhiwandi, Chembur, Ghatkopar, and Chinchpokli.

Hong Kong stuntmaster Tony Leung Siu Hung was the action choreographer of Lahore. The background score was by Wayne Sharpe. Lisbeth Scott of Avatar, Munich, and Chronicles of Narnia fame has sung vocals for Lahore – her first Asian film. Rob Miller, who earlier won a Filmfare award for Chak De! India (2007), is Lahore's sports consultant. MM Kreem has done the music.

== Home media ==
Lahore's DVDs and VCDs are available in Hindi with English subtitles on Moserbaer Home Video. The DVD also features the making of the film.

== Soundtrack ==
- "Ab Ye Kaafila" – KK, Karthik, M. M. Keeravani
- "Musafir" – Daler Mehndi
- "Rang De" – Shankar Mahadevan, Shilpa Rao
- "Saaware" – M. M. Keeravani
- "Musafir" – M. M. Keeravani
- "O Re Bande" – Rahat Fateh Ali Khan, Shilpa Rao
- "Lahore Theme" – Lisbeth Scott
- "Fitrat" – Surendra Chaturvedi (lyrics)

== Release ==
The film was not released in Pakistan as it was regarded there as portraying Pakistan in a bad light.

== Awards and nominations ==
Lahore won two awards at the 57th National Film Awards, Indira Gandhi Award for Best Debut Film of a Director went to producer Vivek Khatkar and director Sanjay Puran Singh Chauhan while Farooque Shaikh won National Film Award for Best Supporting Actor.

6th Apsara Film & Television Producers Guild Awards

Nominated

- Apsara Award for Best Performance in a Supporting Role (Male) – Farouque Sheikh

2011 Zee Cine Awards

Nominated

- Star Screen Awards for Best Background Score 2010 – Wayne Sharpe
- Stardust Awards for Hottest New Director 2010 – Sanjay Puran Singh Chauhan

== See also ==
- List of boxing films
- List of films set in Lahore
