= Sanjay Puran Singh Chauhan =

Indian film director and screenwriter

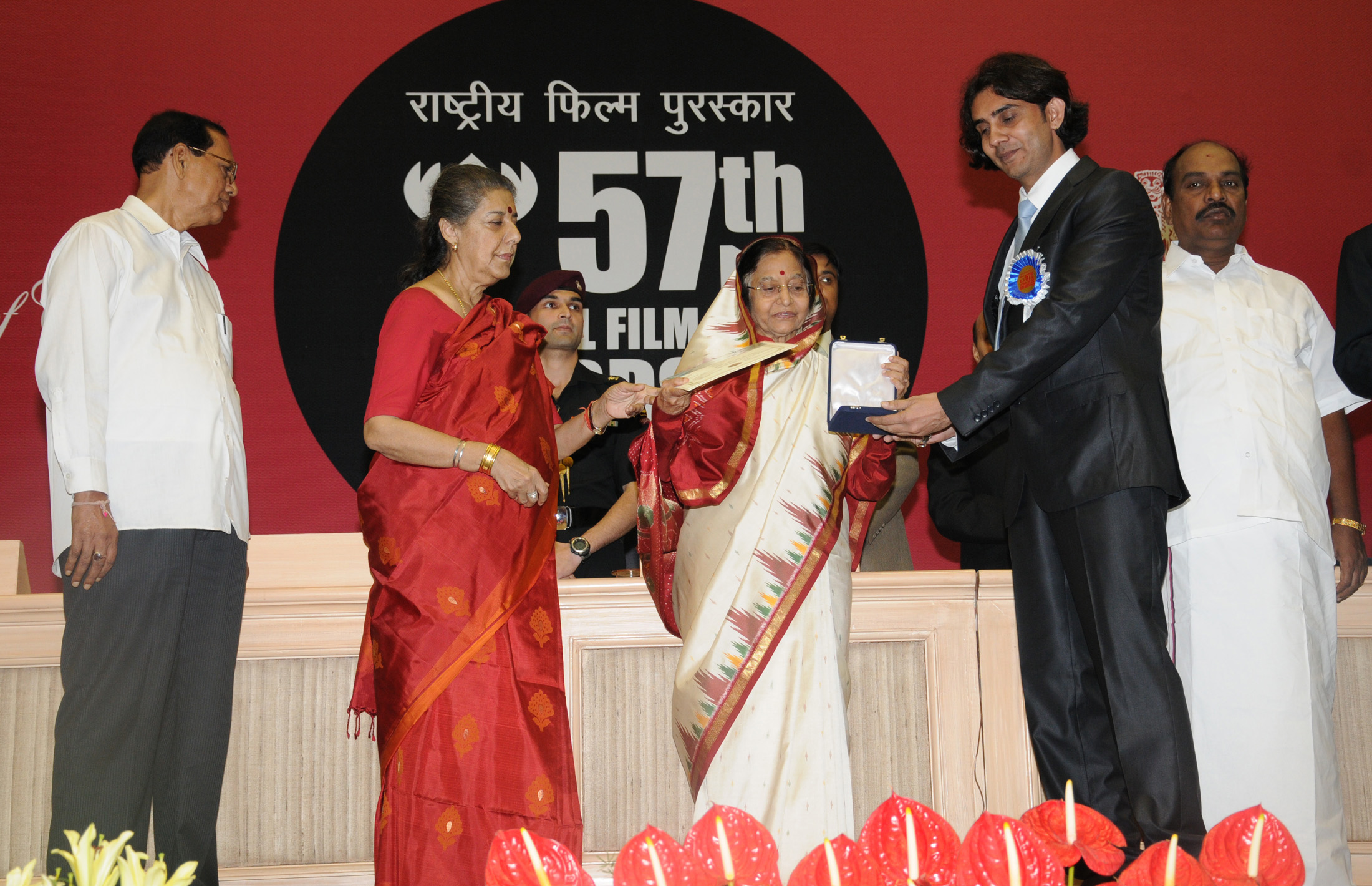
- The President, Smt. Pratibha Devisingh Patil presenting the Indira Gandhi Award to Shri Sanjay Puran Singh Chauhan for the Best Debut Film of a Director (Film: Lahore), at the 57th National Film Awards function, in New Delhi on 22 October 2010
- Born: 8 September; Gwalior, Madhya Pradesh, India
- Occupations: film director, screenwriter
- Years active: 2010–present
- Spouse: Kiran Singh Chauhan

Sanjay Puran Singh Chauhan is an Indian film director and screenwriter, who is most known for his works mainly in Hindi cinema. He won the Indira Gandhi Award for Best Debut Film of a Director at the 2009 National Film Award. In 2021, he won the National Film Award for Best Direction for the film 72 Hoorain.

== Filmography ==
- Lahore (2010) (Director, story, screenplay and dialogues)
- 72 Hoorain (2019) (Director and editor)
- 83 (2021) (Writer)
- Gorkha (TBA)† (Director, story, screenplay and dialogues)

== Awards ==
=== National Film Awards ===
Winner

- 2009 - Best First film of a Director for the film Lahore
- 2021 - Best Direction - Feature Film for the film 72 Hoorain

=== International Film Festival of India ===
Winner

- 2019 - 50th International Film Festival of India

UNESCO Gandhi Medal - Special Mention for Best Film on peace and inter-cultural dialogue for 72 Hoorain

==== Indian Panorama ====
- 2019 - Bahattar Hoorain selected at the Indian Panorama

=== International awards ===
Winner

- 2022 - Writer - Best Story (Adapted) at IIFA (International Indian Film Academy Awards), for 83
- 2009 - Best Film, Special Jury Award at 42nd Worldfest, Houston International Film Festival, US for Lahore

Nomination

- 2022 - Best Screenplay Writer at 67th Filmfare Awards, for 83
- 2009 - Best Director at Asian Festival of 1st Films, Singapore for Lahore
- 2009 - Best Writer at Asian Festival of 1st Films, Singapore for Lahore
- 2010 - Hottest New Director at Stardust Awards for Lahore

=== Jury Member ===
- 2016 - Jury Member at 63rd National Film Awards
- Jury member feature film, Indian Panorama at 51st International Film Festival of India, Goa 2021.
- Jury member (selection) for '75 Creative minds of the tomorrow', at 52nd International Film Festival of India, Goa 2021.
