= Ring Wandering =

2021 Japanese fantasy drama film

- Teaser poster

Japanese name
- Kanji: リング・ワンダリング
Transcriptions
- Revised Hepburn: Ringu Wandaringu
- Directed by: Masakazu Kaneko
- Screenplay by: Masakazu Kaneko; Genki Yoshimura
- Produced by: Takashi Shiotsuki; Kazuhiko Konoike
- Starring: Show Kasamatsu; Junko Abe; Reiko Kataoka; Ken Yasuda
- Cinematography: Koichi Furuya
- Edited by: Masakazu Kaneko
- Music by: Yuko Tomiyama
- Production company: Ring Wandering Production Committee
- Distributed by: kinone film (International)
- Release dates: October 8, 2021 (WFF); February 19, 2022 (Japan)
- Running time: 103 minutes
- Country: Japan
- Language: Japanese

Ring Wandering (Japanese: リング・ワンダリング, Hepburn: Ringu Wandaringu) is a 2021 Japanese fantasy drama film, written and directed by Masakazu Kaneko. Starring Show Kasamatsu, Junko Abe, Reiko Kataoka and Ken Yasuda, the film revolves around a young manga artist who is planning to write a manga about Japanese wolves. It had its premiere at 37th Warsaw Film Festival on October 8, 2021, now it was theatrically released in Japan on 19 February 2022. The film won Golden Peacock (Best Film) at the 52nd International Film Festival of India in November 2021.

== Synopsis ==
A young manga artist who is planning to write a manga about Japanese wolves traces the memories of the past sleeping souls in the downtown Tokyo, triggered by the encounter between an injured woman and her family.

Director Masakazu Kaneko explained, "The title of this work represents the 'journey of life' that goes back and forth between reality and fantasy, experienced by a young hero who is absorbed in drawing manga."

== Cast ==
- Show Kasamatsu as Sosuke
- Junko Abe as Midori / Kozue
- Ken Yasuda (Special appearance)
- Reiko Kataoka
- Toru Shinagawa
- Shunta Ito
- Yōji Tanaka
- Hatsunori Hasegawa

== Release ==
The film had its premiere at 37th Warsaw Film Festival in the International competition section held from 8 October to 17 October 2021. It won jury Commendation Award in the 'Ecumenical Jury' category.

The film was also invited at the 22nd Tokyo Filmex in 'Made in Japan' category, held from 30 October to 7 November 2021, and at 52nd International Film Festival of India held from November 20 to November 28, 2021. It competed for Golden Peacock awards in international competition section. It was released theatrically in Japan on 19 February 2022.

== Awards and nominations ==
Year	Award ceremony	Category	Recipient/ Nominee(s)	Result	Ref.
2021	37th Warsaw Film Festival	Ecumenical Jury Commendation Award	Ring Wandering	Won	
2021	52nd International Film Festival of India	Golden Peacock (Best Film)	Ring Wandering	Won	
2022	43rd Durban International Film Festival	Best Screenplay Award	Ring Wandering	Won	
