= Hatsunori Hasegawa =

Japanese actor (born 1955)

- 長谷川初範
- Born: Hatsunori Hasegawa (長谷川初詔, Hasegawa Hatsunori); June 21, 1955 (age 71); Monbetsu, Hokkaido, Japan
- Other name: Chopin
- Years active: 1976–present
- Agent: K-Dash

Hatsunori Hasegawa (長谷川初範, Hasegawa Hatsunori; born June 21, 1955, in Hokkaido, Japan) is a Japanese actor who is known for his role as Takeshi Yamato in the 1980 Ultraman 80 series. In this series, he is played the lead role as a school teacher who is also a UGM member.

== Filmography ==
=== Drama series ===
- Aoi Tokugawa Sandai (2000), Maeda Toshinaga
- The Grand Family (2021)
- Enjoy Drinking Alone (2021)

=== Film ===
- The Grapes of Joy (2021)
- Ring Wandering (2022)
- Signature (2022)
- In Love and Deep Water (2023)
- Sleeping in the Red Earth (2027)
