= Masakazu Kaneko =

Japanese film director

- Born: 24 January 1978 (age 48); Tokyo, Japan
- Education: Aoyama Gakuin University
- Occupation: Film director

Masakazu Kaneko (金子 雅和, Masakazu Kaneko; born 24 January 1978) is a Japanese film director.

Kaneko's film Ring Wandering won Golden Peacock best film award at 52nd International Film Festival of India in November 2021.

== Career ==
In 2016 Masakazu's first directed-feature The Albino's Trees, was screened as an international premiere in the Beijing International Film Festival, China. In 2017 it was also screened in the 4th Figueira Film Art (the Figueira da Foz International Film Festival), Portugal and awarded the Best Feature, Best Direction, Best Picture.

His second feature Ring Wandering (2021) won the Golden Peacock Best Film Award at the 52nd International Film Festival of India (Goa) and the Ecumenical Jury Commendation Award at the 37th Warsaw Film Festival, Poland.

His third feature River Returns (2024) won the Youth Jury Award for Best Feature Film of the Official Section - RETUEYOS International Competition at the 62nd Gijón International Film Festival (Gijón, Spain) and won the Orient Express Best Film Award at the 45th Porto International Film Festival (Fantasporto 2025), Portugal.

== Selected filmography ==
- The Albino's Trees (2016)
- Ring Wandering (2021)
- River Returns (2025)
- Sleeping in the Red Earth (2027)

== Awards and nominations ==
Year	Award ceremony	Category	Work	Result	Ref.
2016	6th Beijing International Film Festival	Forward Future Section	The Albino's Trees	Nominated	
2017	4th Figueira film Art (Figueira da Foz International Film Festival)	Best Feature; Best Direction; Best Picture	The Albino's Trees	Won	
2021	37th Warsaw Film Festival	Ecumenical Jury Commendation Award	Ring Wandering	Won	
2021	52nd International Film Festival of India	Golden Peacock (Best Film)	Ring Wandering	Won	
2022	43rd Durban International Film Festival	Best Screenplay	Ring Wandering	Won	
2023	22nd Independent Days International Film Festival	Indie Award(Best Feature)	Ring Wandering	Won	
2024	62nd Gijón International Film Festival	Youth Jury Award for the Best Feature Film	River Returns	Won	
2025	45th Fantasporto	Official Competitive Section Orient Express Grand Prize	River Returns	Won	
2025	17th Lighthouse International Film Festival	Narrative Features Competition for the Best Narrative Film	River Returns	Won	
2025	14th Toronto Japanese Film Festival	Special Mention Award	River Returns	Won	
2025	23rd Ischia Film Festival	Best Cinematography Award	River Returns	Won	
2025	11th Transmutación Festival de Cine Contemporáneo	Best Feature Film Official Selection Oculus Aurora	River Returns	Won	
2025	30th Rabat International Author Film Festival	Best Script Award	River Returns	Won	
2025	11th Festival Cinemistica	Special Mention	River Returns	Won	
2025	43rd Fajr International Film Festival	Crystal Simorgh for the Special Jury Award	River Returns	Won	
2025	19th KINOTAYO Festival du cinéma japonais contemporain en France	Jury Award	River Returns	Won	
