= IFFI ICFT UNESCO Gandhi Medal =

- International honor for contributions to World cinema
- Awarded for: "Outstanding film which promotes peace and inter-cultural dialogue"
- Sponsored by: International Film Festival of India
- First award: 2015; 11 years ago
- Final award: 2025
- Most recent winner: Safe House

Highlights
- Total awarded: 12
- First winner: Cinemawala

The IFFI ICFT UNSESCO Gandhi Medal is an international honor instituted since the 46th International Film Festival of India (IFFI). The annual award is presented to an outstanding film which promotes peace and inter-cultural dialogue.

== History ==
In 1994, UNESCO issued a commemorative medal, marking the 125th anniversary of the birth of Mahatma Gandhi. Subsequently, since 2015, ICFT, the UNESCO international advisory body on all matters concerned with film, television and news media, headquartered in Paris, France, in collaboration with IFFI, honors the commemorative Fellini Award to an outstanding film that best reflects Mahatma Gandhi's ideals of peace, tolerance and non-violence.

== Medal Winners ==
Year	Film	Original Title	Director	Country
2015	Cinemawala		Kaushik Ganguly	India
2016	Cold of Kalandar		Mustafa Kara	Turkey
2017	Kshitij A Horizon		Manouj Kadaamh	India
2018	Walking with the Wind		Praveen Morchhale	India
2019	Rwanda; 72 Hoorain (Special Mention)		Riccardo Salvetti; Sanjay Puran Singh	Italy; India
2020	200 Meters		Ameen Nayfeh	Palestine
2021	Lingui, The Sacred Bonds	Lingui, les liens sacrés	Mahamat-Saleh Haroun	Chad; France; Belgium; Germany
2022	Nargesi		Payam Eskandar	Iran
2023	Drift		Anthony Chen	United Kingdom; France; Greece
2024	Crossing		Levan Akin	Sweden; Denmark; France; Turkey; Georgia
2025	Safe House	Før mørket	Eirik Svensson	Norway
