= The New Year That Never Came =

2024 Romanian film by Bogdan Mureșanu

- Romanian theatrical release poster
- Romanian: Anul Nou care n-a fost
- Directed by: Bogdan Mureșanu
- Screenplay by: Bogdan Mureșanu
- Based on: The Christmas Gift by Bogdan Mureșanu
- Produced by: Bogdan Mureșanu; Vanja Kovačević
- Starring: Adrian Văncică; Nicoleta Hâncu; Iulian Postelnicu; Mihai Călin; Emilia Dobrin; Andrei Miercure
- Cinematography: Boróka Biró; Tudor Platon
- Edited by: Vanja Kovačević; Mircea Lăcătuș
- Production companies: Kinotopia; All Inclusive Films; TVR
- Release dates: 1 September 2024 (Venice); 24 September 2024 (Romania)
- Running time: 138 minutes
- Country: Romania
- Language: Romanian

The New Year That Never Came (Romanian: Anul Nou care n-a fost) is a 2024 Romanian historical tragicomedy film written and directed by Bogdan Mureșanu in his feature directorial debut. Based on Mureșanu's 2018 short film, The Christmas Gift, it stars Adrian Văncică, Nicoleta Hâncu, Iulian Postelnicu, Mihai Călin, Emilia Dobrin, and Andrei Miercure. It premiered at the 81st Venice International Film Festival on 1 September 2024, where it won the Orizzonti Award for Best Film. The film received a theatrical release in Romania on 24 September 2024.

== Premise ==
Six lives converge on 20 December 1989 amid the unrest of the Romanian revolution.

== Cast ==
- Adrian Văncică as Gelu
- Nicoleta Hâncu as Florina Miu, an actress from the Nottara Theater
- Iulian Postelnicu as Ionuț Dincă, a Securitate officer
- Mihai Călin as Ștefan Silvestru, a TVR director
- Emilia Dobrin as Margareta Dincă, Ionuț's mother
- Andrei Miercure as Laurențiu Silvestru, Ștefan and Alina's son, a student
- Ioana Flora as Mariana, Gelu's wife
- Ada Galeș as Camelia Dincă, Ionuț's wife
- Marian Râlea as Mihalcea, a TVR producer
- Gabriel Radu as Gabi, a TVR cameraman
- Manuela Hărăbor as Alina Silvestru, Ștefan's wife and Laurențiu's mother
- Ion Sapdaru as Comrade Vârtosu, the head of TVR
- Angel Popescu as Alex
- Vlad Ionuț Popescu as Vlad, Laurențiu's best friend
- Victoria Raileanu as Lili, an actress
- Elvira Deatcu as doamnă
- Gabriel Spahiu as Benghe, Florina's neighbor
- Vasile Muraru as Uncle Romică
- Theodor Șoptelea as Manu
- Sorin Cociș as Stamate
- Răzvan Vasilescu as the theater director
- Ilinca Hărnuț as the scenographer
- Luca Toma as Marius, Gelu and Mariana's son
- Mircea Andreescu as Uncle Chican
- Ioan Paraschiv as the investigator
- Doru Cătănescu as the postman
- Nicodim Ungureanu as the taxi driver
- Marius Damian as Uncle Jiji
- Marian Adochiței as Berlogea
- Dana Voicu as a pharmacist
- Afrodita Androne as the set secretary
- Virgil Aioanei as Gelu's coworker
- Vlad Jipa as Comrade Marcel

== Production ==
The film expands on characters from director Bogdan Mureșanu's 2018 short film, The Christmas Gift. Regarding the feature film's conception, Mureșanu stated, "I was interested in the humanity of small lives exposed to great historical events and how they deal with the feeling of a disappearing world." Principal photography took place in and around Bucharest. Filming also took place in Gostinu, a commune roughly an hour outside of Bucharest. Cinematographer Biró Boróka utilized the Arri Alexa Mini for filming. Filming was completed by 28 September 2023.

== Release ==
The trailer was released on 28 August 2024. The film premiered at the 81st Venice International Film Festival on 1 September 2024 as part of the Orizzonti competition. The following day, Memento Distribution acquired the French distribution rights to the film. The film received a theatrical release in Romania on 24 September 2024. On its opening weekend, it topped the Romanian box office with over 20,000 admissions. It opened the South East European Film Festival in April 2025.

== Reception ==
=== Critical response ===
Ștefan Dobroiu of Cineuropa wrote, "...The New Year That Never Came is a powerful example of how cinema can become a time machine that teleports us to a certain era, bringing us back to safety just as the issues of that period seep into our very soul." Wendy Ide of Screen Daily wrote, "There's a lot going on, and initially, the film coasts a little, before gradually picking up momentum. But a near 20-minute final sequence, set to Ravel's Bolero, builds to an explosive crescendo, seamlessly blending archive footage into the action and capturing the exhilarating impact of history in the making."

=== Accolades ===
Award	Year	Category	Nominee(s)	Result	Ref.
Cairo International Film Festival	2024	Golden Pyramid	The New Year That Never Came	Won	
Crossing Europe	2025	Best Fiction Film	The New Year That Never Came	Won	
European Film Awards	2024	European Discovery	The New Year That Never Came	Nominated	
Gopo Awards	2025	Best Feature Film	The New Year That Never Came	Won	
Gopo Awards	2025	Best Director	Bogdan Mureșanu	Won	
Gopo Awards	2025	Best Screenplay	Bogdan Mureșanu	Won	
Gopo Awards	2025	Best Lead Actor	Adrian Văncică	Won	
Gopo Awards	2025	Best Lead Actress	Nicoleta Hâncu	Won	
Gopo Awards	2025	Best Supporting Actor	Iulian Postelnicu	Nominated	
Gopo Awards	2025	Best Cinematography	Boróka Biró, Tudor Platon	Nominated	
Gopo Awards	2025	Best Editing	Vanja Kovačević, Mircea Lăcătuș	Won	
Gopo Awards	2025	Best Sound	Sebastian Zsemlye	Won	
Gopo Awards	2025	Best Production Design	Iulia Fulicea, Victor Fulicea	Won	
Gopo Awards	2025	Best Costumes	Dana Anghel	Nominated	
Gopo Awards	2025	Best Makeup and Hairstyling	Iulia Roșeanu, Domnica Bodogan	Won	
Gopo Awards	2025	Best First Feature	The New Year That Never Came	Won	
International Film Festival of India	2024	Best Film	The New Year That Never Came	Nominated	
International Film Festival of India	2024	Best Director	Bogdan Mureșanu	Won	
Lisbon & Estoril Film Festival	2024	Best Film	The New Year That Never Came	Nominated	
Luxembourg City Film Festival	2025	Grand Prix	The New Year That Never Came	Won	
Luxembourg City Film Festival	2025	FIPRESCI Prize	The New Year That Never Came	Won	
Molodist International Film Festival	2024	Scythian Deer	The New Year That Never Came	Nominated	
Palm Springs International Film Festival	2024	New Voices/New Visions Grand Jury Prize	The New Year That Never Came	Nominated	
São Paulo International Film Festival	2024	Best Fiction	The New Year That Never Came	Nominated	
Venice Film Festival	2024	Orizzonti Award for Best Film	The New Year That Never Came	Won	
Venice Film Festival	2024	FIPRESCI Prize	The New Year That Never Came	Won	
Vilnius International Film Festival	2025	Best Film	The New Year That Never Came	Special mention	
Zurich Film Festival	2024	Best International Feature Film	The New Year That Never Came	Nominated	
