= Janno Jürgens =

Estonian film director

Janno Jürgens (born 18 May 1985 in Haapsalu) is an Estonian film director.

In 2012 he graduated from Baltic Film, Media, Arts and Communication School of Tallinn University.

== Filmography ==
- "Mütomaan" (2005)
- "Ting" (2006)
- "Algolis" (2007)
- "Kuraditõestus" (2008)
- "Inimestest" (2008)
- "Tulepistmine" (2009)
- "Distants" (2012)
- "Meedik" (2014)
- "Final Cut" (2014)
- "Räägitakse, et tomatid armastavad rokkmuusikat" (2016)
- Rain (2020)
