= Bogdan Mureșanu =

Romanian film director (born 1974)

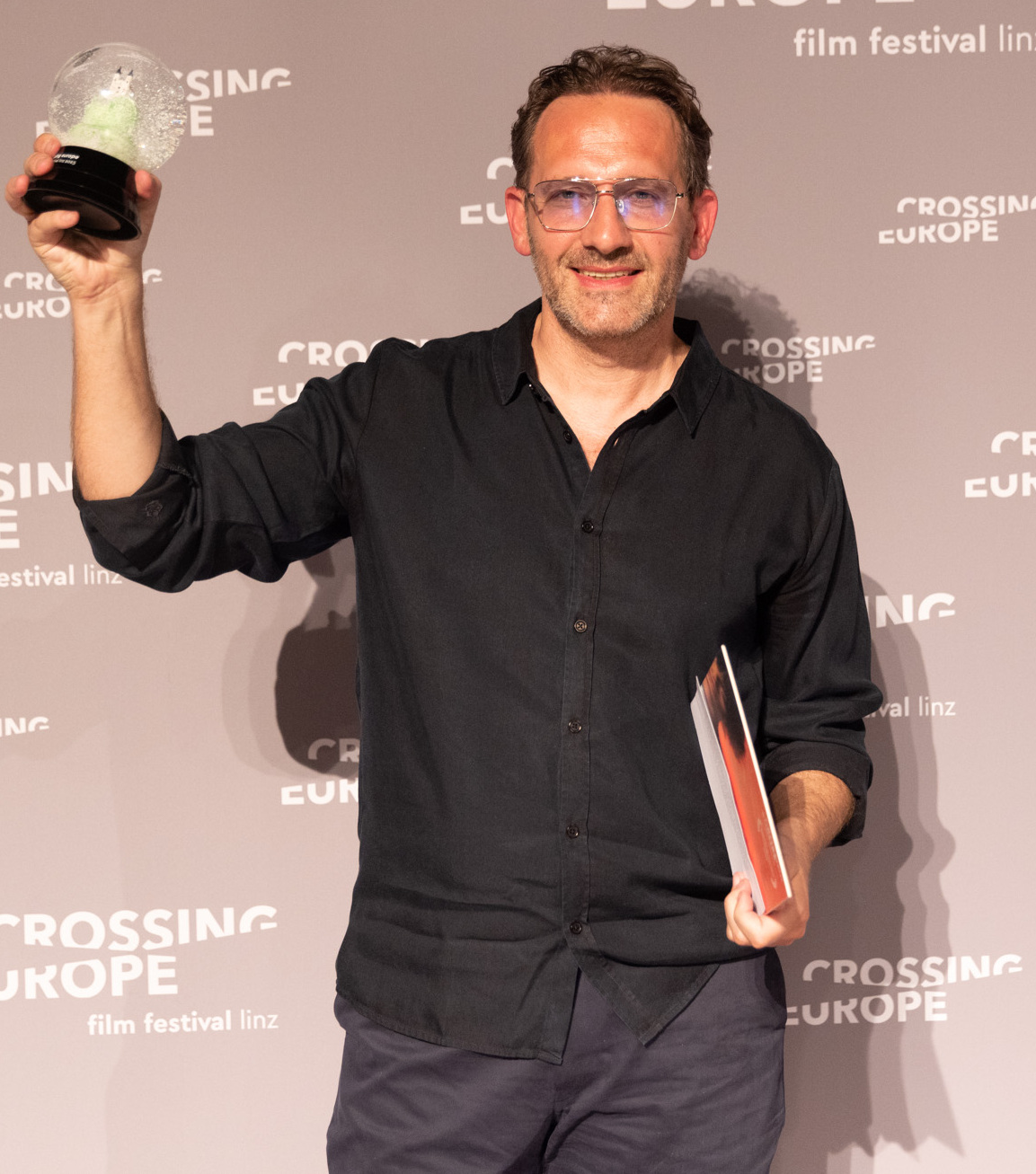
- Mureșanu at the Crossing Europe Festival (2025)
- Born: 10 August 1974 (age 52); Bucharest, Romania
- Occupation: Film director

Bogdan Mureșanu (born 10 August 1974) is a Romanian film director and screenwriter.

== Life and career ==
Born in Bucharest, Mureșanu graduated from the Saint Sava National College and studied political science at the University of Bucharest. He then worked as a journalist and a copywriter in advertising agencies, and in the meanwhile he cultivated a passion for poetry and prose, which led to the publication of his short story collection Erata in 2006.

In 2007, Mureșanu won a TIFF-HBO contest with the screenplay The Living Torch, and decided to focus on cinema. He studied screenwriting at the London Film Academy and, in 2011, was accepted into the National Film and Television School in Beaconsfield. He made his directorial debut in 2012, with the short Tuns ras si frezat.

In 2018, Mureșanu had his breakout with the short film The Christmas Gift; the short earned over 50 international awards, notably the European Film Award for best short film, and was shortlisted for the Academy Award for Best Live Action Short Film nomination. Following the critical success of the short film, Mureșanu decided to develop it into a feature film; the film, The New Year That Never Came, premiered at the 81st Venice International Film Festival, where it won the Orizzonti Best Film Award and the FIPRESCI Award. The film later won a string of other awards, including the Golden Pyramid Award for Best Film at the Cairo International Film Festival, the Silver Atlas and Youth Jury Prize at the Arras Film Festival, and the Silver Peacock for the Best Director Award at the International Film Festival of India. In 2025, he directed an animated short, The Magician, that premiered at the Annecy International Animation Film Festival.

== Filmography ==
- Tuns ras si frezat (2013, short)
- Negruzzi 14 (2016, short)
- Spid (2016, short)
- The Christmas Gift (2018, short)
- The Merry-Go-Round (2020, short)
- The New Year That Never Came (2024)
- The Magician (2025, short)
