= 51st International Film Festival of India =

2020 Indian film festival

- Opening film: Another Round
- Closing film: Wife of a Spy
- Location: Dr. Shyama Prasad Mukherjee Indoor Stadium at Panaji, Goa, India
- Founded: 1952
- Awards: Lifetime Achievement Award: (Vittorio Storaro); Golden Peacock-Best Film: Into the Darkness: Silver Peacock; Best Director: Chen-Nien Ko; Best Actor: Tzu-Chuan Liu; Best Actress: Zofia Stafiej; ICFT INESCO Gandhi Medal: 200 Meters by Ameen Nayfeh
- Hosted by: Government of Goa; Directorate of Film Festivals
- No. of films: Screened: 224; Premiered: 162
- Festival date: 16–24 January 2021
- Website: iffigoa.org

International Film Festival of India
- 52nd 50th

The 51st International Film Festival of India was held from 16 to 24 January 2021 in Goa. Due to the COVID-19 pandemic a hybrid model was used, with physical and virtual screening of 50 films out of 224 films across various categories. Bangladesh was the country of focus for this edition of the festival with four films from the country included in the 'country of focus' section.

The festival highlighted autism spectrum disorder (ASD) by premiering a film by Shreedhar, In Our World in non-feature film, Indian Panorama section on 18 January 2021.

The opening and closing ceremonies of the festival were aired live on DD India and DD National channels on 16 January and 24 January 2021, respectively.

== Events ==
Being a ‘hybrid’ film festival, a few events are organised online also.

=== Retrospective films ===
1. Live Flesh, Bad Education and Volver by Pedro Almodóvar (Spain)
2. The Square and Force Majeure by Ruben Östlund (Sweden)
3. One on One by Kim Ki-duk (South Korea)

=== Master classes ===
Shekhar Kapur, Priyadarshan, Perry Lang, Subhash Ghai and Tanvir Mokammel are scheduled to hold master classes.

=== In-conversation sessions ===
- Ricky Kej
- Madhur Bhandarkar
- Anjali Menon
- Prasoon Joshi
- Rahul Rawail
- Aditya Dhar
- John Matthew Matthan
- Prasanna Vithanage
- Bickram Ghosh
- Abu Bakr Shawky
- Anupama Chopra
- Sunil Doshi
- Dominic Sangma
- Sunit Tandon
- Hariharan
- Pablo Cesar

=== Tribute ===
Tribute to the celebrated filmmaker Satyajit Ray marking his birth centenary by screening his classic works:

- Charulata (1964)
- Ghare Baire (1984)
- Pather Panchali (1955)
- Shatranj Ke Khilari (1977)
- Sonar Kella (1974)

Tribute to Netaji Subhas Chandra Bose on the occasion of his 125th birth anniversary by screening film:

- Netaji Subhas Chandra Bose: The Forgotten Hero by Shyam Benegal

=== Online events ===
1. 50 films out of 224 films across various categories are scheduled to be screened online.
2. Opening and closing ceremony live telecast
3. Q&A sessions
4. Film appreciation sessions by Film and Television Institute of India professors: Mazhar Kamran, Madhu Apsara and Pankaj Saxena
5. Mid fest world premiere of Mehrunisa

== Jury ==
=== International jury ===
- Pablo César (Argentina), director, producer, writer, actor and editor, Chairman
- Prasanna Vithanage (Sri Lanka), filmmaker
- Abu Bakr Shawky (Austria), writer and director
- Priyadarshan (India), director, screenwriter and producer
- Rubaiyat Hossain (Bangladesh), director, writer and producer

=== Feature film jury ===
- John Matthew Matthan, filmmaker, screenwriter and producer, Chairperson
- Dominic Sangma, filmmaker and screenwriter
- Jadumoni Dutta, filmmaker, screenwriter and producer
- Kala Master, choreographer
- Kumar Sohoni, filmmaker and writer
- Rama Vij, actor and producer
- B. Ramamurthy, filmmaker
- Sanghamitra Chaudhuri, filmmaker and journalist
- Sanjay Puran Singh Chauhan, filmmaker
- Satinder Mohan, film critic and journalist
- Sudhakar Vasantha, filmmaker and producer
- T Prasanna Kumar, film producer
- U Radhakrishnan, ex-secretary, Federation of Film Societies of India

=== Non-feature film jury ===
- Haobam Paban Kumar, feature and documentary filmmaker, Chairperson
- Atul Gangwar, director, screenwriter, and producer
- Jwngdao Bodosa, filmmaker
- Mandar Talauliker, filmmaker
- Sajin Babu, filmmaker
- Satish Pande, producer and director
- Vaijayanti Apte, script writer and producer

== Winners ==
Sources:

- Golden Peacock (Best Film): Into the Darkness
- Silver Peacock:
  - IFFI Best Director Award: Chen-Nien Ko for Taiwanese film The Silent Forest
  - IFFI Best Actor Award (Male): Tzu-Chuan Liu, film The Silent Forest
  - IFFI Best Actor Award (Female): Zofia Stafiej for Polish film I Never Cry
  - IFFI Best Debut Director Award: Valentina by Cassio Pereira dos Santos
  - Silver Peacock Special Jury Award: February by Kamen Kalev
  - Special Mention: Kripal Kalita for the film Bridge

== Special awards ==
- Life Time Achievement Award - Vittorio Storaro
- IFFI ICFT UNESCO Gandhi Medal: 200 Meters by Ameen Nayfeh
- Indian Film Personality of the Year - Biswajit Chatterjee

== Official selections ==
=== Opening film ===
- Another Round (Denmark), by Thomas Vinterberg, it was Denmark's official entry to the Oscars, in 2020.

=== Mid fest film ===
- Mehrunisa (Austria), directed by Sandeep Kumar, stars formidable actor Farrukh Jaffar (88). The film revolves around the story that lends wings to a woman's lifelong dream.

=== Closing film ===
- Wife of a Spy (Japan), theatrical version of television film directed by Kiyoshi Kurosawa, a historical drama won the Silver Lion for Best Director at 77th Venice International Film Festival.

=== Kaleidoscope section ===
Twelve foreign films were screened in this section.

These include:

1. Night of the Kings by Philippe Lacôte (France)
2. Love Affair(s) by Emmanuel Mouret (France)
3. The Big Hit (Un triomphe) by Emmanuel Courcol (France)
4. Window Boy Would also Like to Have a Submarine by Alex Piperno (Uruguay)
5. Forgotten We’ll Be by Fernando Trueba (Colombia)
6. Haifa Street by Mohanad Hayal (Iraq)
7. We Still Have the Deep Black Night by Gustavo Galvao (Brazil, Germany)
8. Parthenon by Mantas Kvedaravicius (Lithuania)
9. Apples by Christos Nikou (Greece)
10. My Little Sister by Stephanie Chuat and Veronique Reymond (Switzerland)
11. The Death of Cinema and My Father Too by Dani Rosenberg (Israel)
12. Valley of the Gods by Lech Majewski (Poland)

=== Golden peacock award ===
In international section, 15 films are competing for the Golden Peacock Award. Argentine filmmaker Pablo Cesar is head of its international jury panel.

The films competing for the Golden Peacock Award are:

1. The Domain by Tiago Guedes (Portugal)
2. Into The Darkness by Anders Refn (Denmark)†
3. February by Kamen Kalev (Bulgaria, France)
4. My Best Part by Nicolas Maury (France)
5. I Never Cry by Piotr Domalewski (Poland, Ireland)
6. La Verónica by Leonardo Medel (Chile)
7. Light For The Youth by Shin Su-won (South Korea)
8. Red Moon Tide by Lois Patiño (Spain)
9. Dream About Sohrab by Ali Ghavitan (Iran)
10. The Dogs Didn’t Sleep Last Night by Ramin Rasouli (Afghanistan, Iran)
11. The Silent Forest by KO Chen-Nien (Taiwan)
12. Bridge by Kripal Kalita (India)
13. A Dog and His Man by Siddharth Tripathy (India)
14. Thaen by Ganesh Vinayakan (India)

† Award winning film

=== Indian panorama award ===
Feature films

- Saand Ki Aankh (Hindi), opening film
- Bridge (Assamese)
- Avijatrik (Bengali)
- Aavartan (Hindi)
- A Dog And His Man (Chhattisgarhi)
- Brahma Janen Gopon Kommoti (Bengali)
- Pinki Elli? (Kannada)
- Safe (Malayalam)
- Eigi Kona (Manipuri)
- Prawaas (Marathi)
- Kalira Atita (Oriya)
- Thaen (Tamil)
- Gatham (Telugu)
- Asuran (Tamil)
- Chhichhore (Hindi)
- Kappela (Malayalam)
- Up, Up & Up (animation)
- Namo (Sanskrit)
- June (Marathi)
- Karkhanisanchi Waari (Marathi)
- Kettyolaanu Ente Malakha (Malayalam)
- Thahira (Malayalam)
- Trance (Malayalam)

Non feature films

- 100 Years Of Chrysotom - A Biographical Film (English)
- Ahimsa- Gandhi: The Power Of The Powerless (English)
- Catdog (Hindi)
- Drama Queens (English)
- Green Blackberries (Nepali)
- Highways of Life (Manipuri)
- Holy Rights (Hindi)
- In Our World (English)
- Investing Life (English)
- Jaadoo (Hindi)
- Jhat Aayi Basant (Pahari/Hindi)
- Justice Delayed But Delivered (Hindi)
- Khisa (Marathi)
- Oru Paathiraa Swapnam Pole (Malayalam)
- Paanchika (Gujarati)
- Pandhara Chivda (Marathi)
- Radha (Bengali)
- Shantabai (Hindi)
- Still Alive (Marathi)
- The 14th February & Beyond, by Utpal Kalal (English), It's an investigative film on Valentine's Day

=== In memoriam ===
A special section in this festival will be organized in honour of the artists who died in the year 2020 to pay homage to them.

- 42 starring Chadwick Boseman
- Basant Bahar starring Nimmi
- Bobby starring Rishi Kapoor
- Brahmachari
- Chilika Teerey starring Bijay Mohanty
- Charulata, by Satyajit Ray, starring Soumitra Chatterjee
- Chhoti Si Baat by Basu Chatterjee
- Cutter's Way by Ivan Passer
- Dabangg, music directed by Wajid Khan
- Devdas, dance choreographed by Saroj Khan
- Dombivali Fast by Nishikant Kamat
- Ek Din Achanak
- E.T. the Extra-Terrestrial
- Extremely Loud & Incredibly Close starring Max von Sydow
- Gandhi costume designer Bhanu Athaiya
- Ghare Baire, Satyajit Ray
- Kedarnath starring Sushant Singh Rajput
- Land of the Gods
- Midnight Express by Alan Parker
- Mission Kashmir
- Paan Singh Tomar starring Irrfan Khan
- Paths of Glory
- Sigaram starring S. P. Balasubrahmanyam
- Sonar Kella starring Soumitra Chatterjee
- Soorma Bhopali by Jagdeep
- Tara
- The Hateful Eight music composed by Ennio Morricone
- The Heiress starring Olivia de Havilland

=== World panorama ===
- Only Human by Igor Ivanov (Macedonia)
- The Lawyer by Romas Zabarauskar (Lithuania)
- Rupsa Nodir Banke by Tanvir Mokammel (Bangladesh)
- Buiten Is Het Feest by Jelle Nesna (Netherlands)
- 3 PUFF by Saman Salour (Andorra)
- The Atlantic City Story by Henry Butash (USA)
- Gesture by Pouya Parsamagham (Iran)
- Zhanym, Ty Ne Poverish by Ernar Nurgaliev (Kazakhstan)
- Running Against The Wind by Jan Philipp Weyl (Germany, Ethiopia)
- Spring Blossom by Suzanne Lindon (France)
- The Audition by Ina Weisse (Germany)
- Moral Order by Mario Barroso (Portugal)
- Unidentified by Bogdan George Apetri (Romania)
- The First Death of Joana by Cristiane Oliveira (Brazil)
- The trouble with Nature by Illum Jacobi (Denmark, France)
- The Castle by Lina LužYtė (Lithuania, Ireland)
- Maternal by Maura Delpero (Italy)
- A Fish Swimming Upside Down by Erliza Pëtkova (Germany)
- Fauna by Nicolás Pereda (Spanish)
- Suk Suk by Ray Yeung (Hong Kong)
- Long Time No See by Pierre Filmon (France)
- Summer Rebels by Martina Sakova (Slovakia)
- In The Dusk by Šarūnas Bartas (Lithuania)
- A Common Crime by Francisco Márquez (Argentina)
- Lola by Laurent Micheli (Belgium, France)
- The Voiceless by Pascal Rabaté (France)
- The Taste of Pho by Mariko Bobrik (Poland, Germany)
- Stardust by Gabriel Range (UK)
- Funny Face by Tim Sutton (USA)
- Naked Animals by Melanie Waelde (Germany)
- Las Niñas by Pilar Palomero (Spain)
- Kala Azar by Janis Rafa (Netherlands, Greece)
- История Одной Картины by Ruslan Magomadov (Russia)
- Paradies by Immanuel Esser (Germany)
- Borderline by Anna Alfieri (UK)
- A Simple Man by Tassos Gerakinis (Greece)
- 180° Rule by Farnoosh Samadi (Iran)
- Here We Are by Nir Bergman (Israel, Italy)
- The Border by Davide David Carrera (Colombia)
- End Of Season by ElmarImanov (Azerbaijan, Germany, Georgia)
- This Is My Desire by Arie Esiri, Chuko Esiri (Nigeria, USA)
- Karnawal by Juan Pablo Felix (Argentina)
- Parents by Eric Bergkraut, Ruth Schweikert (Switzerland)
- The Voice by OgnjenSviličić (Croatia)
- Spiral...Fear Is Everywhere by Kurtis David Harder (Canada)
- Isaac by Angeles Hernandez & David Matamoros (Spain)
- Farewell Amor by Ekwa Msangi (US)
- The Man Who Sold His Skin by Kaouther Ben Hania (Tunisia, France)
- Roland Rabers Cabaret of Death by Roland Reber (Germany)
- Children of the Sun by Prasanna Vithanage (Sri Lanka)

=== Country in focus ===
Four Bangladeshi films will be showcased in this section.

- Jibondhuli by Tanvir Mokammel
- Meghmallar by Zahidur Rahim Anjan
- Under Construction by Rubaiyat Hossain
- Sincerely Yours, Dhaka by Tanvir Ahsan, Abdullah Al Noor, Syed Saleh Sobhan Auneem, Krishnendu Chattopadhyay, Golam Kibria Farooki, Mir Mukarram Hossain, Nuhash Humayun, Mahmudul Islam, Rahat Rahman, Robiul Alam Robi, Syed Ahmed Shawki

=== Goan films ===
- Shinvar - The Downpour
- Written in the Corners

=== ICFT UNESCO Gandhi Medal ===
The IFFI presents ICFT Prize consisting of the UNESCO Gandhi Medal in collaboration with International Council for Film, Television and Audiovisual Communication (ICFT) Paris.

- 200 Meters by Ameen Nayfeh (Italy, Sweden, Jordan, Palestine, Qatar)
- An Old Lady by Lim Sun-ae (South Korea)
- Berlin Alexanderplatz by Burhan Qurbani (Germany, Netherlands)
- The Lamp of Truth by Thanesh Gopal (Canada)
- Palmyra by Ivan Bolotnikov (Russia)
- Prawaas by Shashank Udapurkar (India)
- Red Soil by Farid Bentouumi (Belgium, France)
- Summertime by Carlos López Estrada (USA)
- Thahira by Siddik Paravoor (India)
- Unsound by Ian Watson (Australia)

=== Debut director ===
- Gold For Dogs by Anna Cazenave Cambet (France)
- Otto the Barbarian by Ruxandra Maria Ghițescu (Belgium, Romania)
- Ravine by Balázs Krasznahorkai (Hungary)
- Valentina by Cássio Pereira dos Santos (Brazil)
- Wildfire by Cathy Brady (Ireland, UK)

=== Special screening ===
- Acasă, My Home by Radu Ciorniciuc (Romania)
- An Impossible Project by Jens Meurer (Germany)
- I Am Greta by Nathan Grossman (Sweden)
- Little Girl by Sébastien Lifshitz (France)
- Netaji Subhas Chandra Bose: The Forgotten Hero by Shyam Benegal (India)
- The Human Voice by Pedro Almodóvar (Spain)
