= Sohil Vaidya =

Indian filmmaker

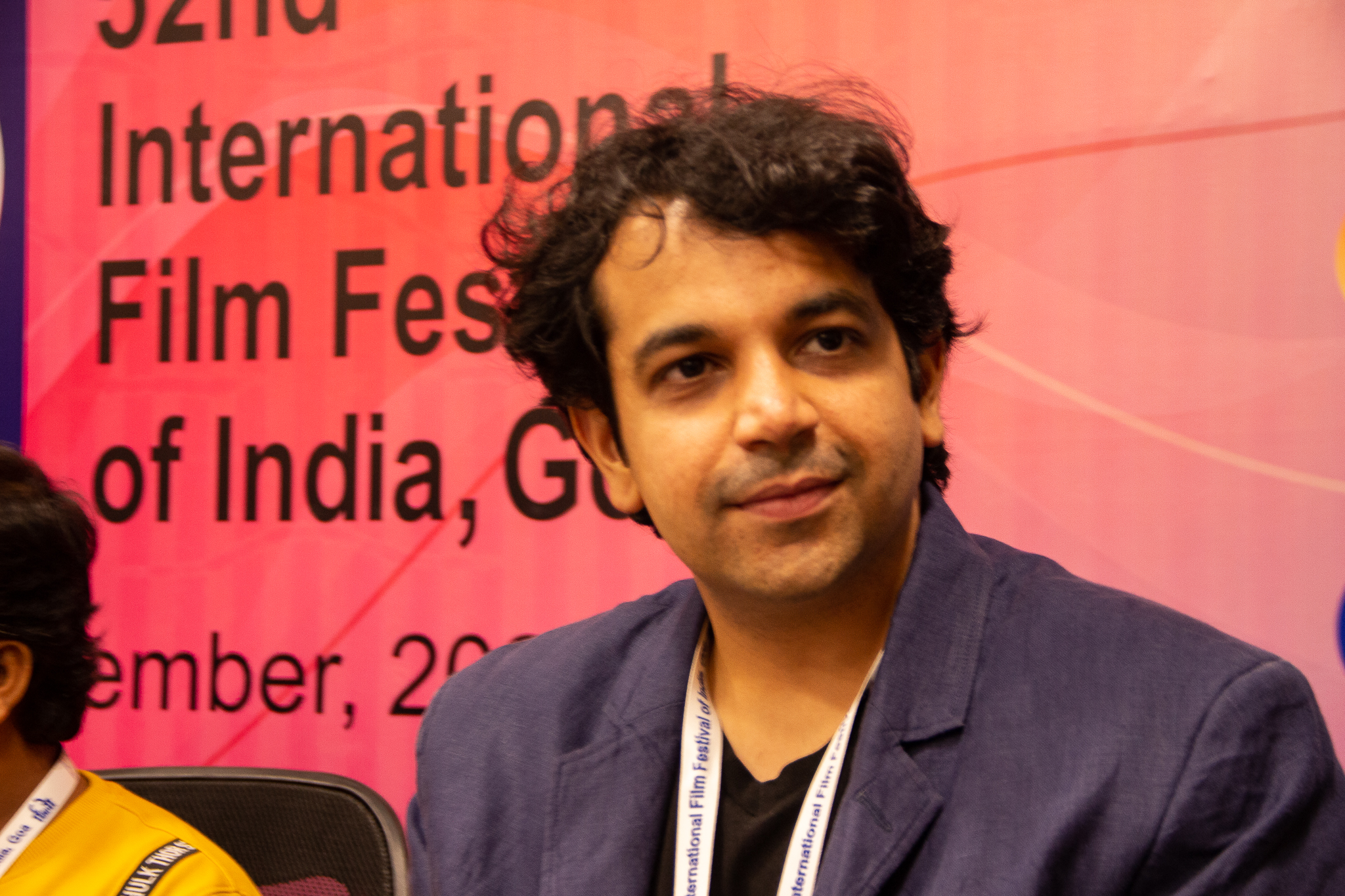
- Sohil Vaidya at 52nd International Film Festival of India
- Born: 31 March; Pune, India
- Education: MFA Film Production
- Alma mater: University of Southern California School of Cinematic Arts
- Awards: 70th National Film Award Grand Prix at Melbourne International Film Festival.
- Website: www.sohilvaidya.com

Sohil Vaidya is an Indian writer and film director. He is winner of 70th National Film Awards and Grand Prix at Melbourne International Film Festival for his film Murmurs of the Jungle. He is recipient of DGA student Award for his USC thesis film Difficult People. His films have screened at festivals worldwide including Rotterdam,Chicago, Raindance, Melbourne, International Film Festival India, Palm Springs, Flickers Rhode Island International Film Festival, LA Asian Pacific etc.

== Early life and education ==
Vaidya was born in Pune, India. He attended Nutan Marathi Vidyalaya's School and Junior College. He later attended Sinhagad College of Science where he did Master's in Computer Science. During this time he got interested in cinema. He started watching films at National Film Archive of India and developed liking for Stanley Kubrick, Paul Thomas Anderson, Yasujiro Ozu, and Satyajit Ray. He subsequently was selected for University of Southern California School of Cinematic Arts where he did his MFA in Film Production with focus on writing and directing. At USC Sohil received James Bridges Directing Scholarship and Edward Thomas Troutner Cinematography Scholarship.

== Films ==
=== Murmurs of the Jungle ===
Murmurs of the Jungle had its world premiere at 52nd International Film Festival of India in Indian Panorama for Non-Feature Films. It had its International Premiere at 51st International Film Festival Rotterdam. It won the Best Short Award at National Film Development Corporation's Film Bazaar. It was subsequently screened at Chicago, Raindance, Camden, 49th Athens International Film + Video Festival and the 16th SiGNs Film Festival, Kerala, India in Documentary Focus Section.

It won the top prize of the shorts section i.e. Grand Prix at Melbourne International Film Festival. It won the 70th National Film Awards for the year 2022 for best Documentary

=== The Timekeeper ===
The Timekeeper is about a man desperately seeks to preserve his lifelong passion for creating analog clocks in an era of digital totality. It had its world premiere at 37th Flickers' Rhode Island International Film Festival and later it was screened at Dharamshala International Film Festival, Oxford Film Festival and Indie Meme Film Festival.

=== Geeta ===
Geeta is a film about modern day slavery. Nimisha Menon of Indie short magazine describes it saying "Sohil Vaidya weaves an emotional drama on the illegal trafficking that brings 15,000 people to the American shores as forced labourers, all through the eyes of Geeta. Geeta is a testament to the collective injustice that exists in the society and how even the educated, well-informed individuals of the so-called modern and developed world remain entrapped in it, much like Geeta herself…". Geeta had its world premiere at LA Shorts and was screened at Long Beach Independent Film Festival, Seattle Social Justice Film Festival, New Generation Indian Independent Film Festival, Frankfurt, DTLA Film Festival, and nominated at NewFilmmakers Los Angeles Film Festival as best short film. It was included in the list of 10 shorts chronicling pan Asian experiences by Kajal Mag.

=== Difficult People ===
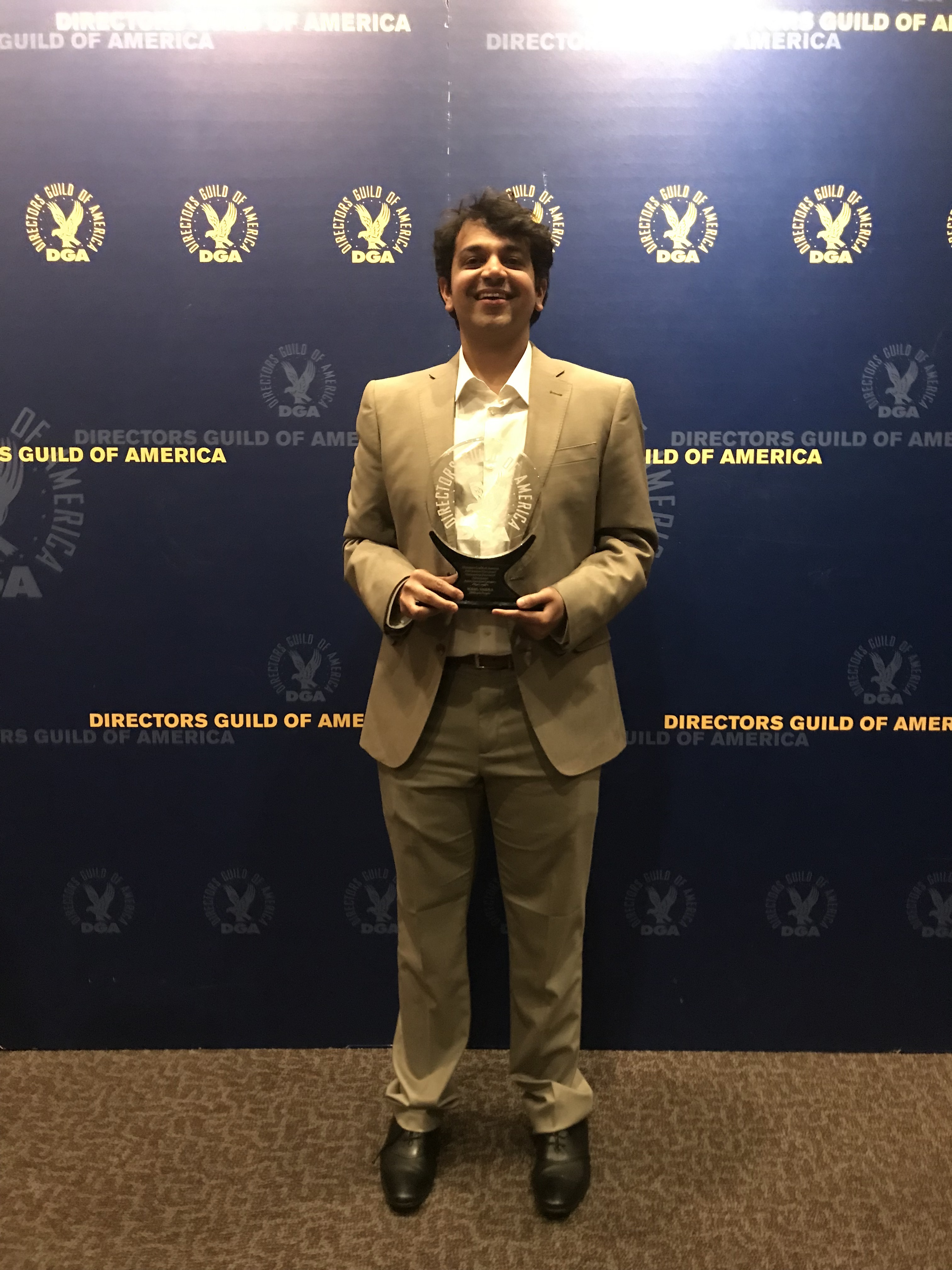
Sohil Vaidya at the Directors Guild of America's Award ceremony

Difficult People is a look at masculinity in contemporary culture and is about a stubborn father and son learning to deal with each other after matriarchs passing. It has Abhay Mahajan and Chittranjan Giri in Lead roles. It had its world premiere at 69th Montercatini International Film Festival. It won the Directors Guild of America's Best Asian American Filmmaker Award, Platinum Remi Award at WorldFest Houston, Leo Award at Da Vinci International Film Festival, Jelly Fest award and best cinematography award at Little Wings Film Festival in London. Abhay Mahajan won Best actor in Lead Role at Jaipur International Film Festival. Difficult People was screened at Palm Spring Short Fest, Edmonton International Film Festival, Los Angeles Asian Pacific Film Festival, Bentonville Film Festival, Crossroad Film Festival, Mississippi, Newport Beach Film Festival, Arizona International Film Festival, Westchester International Film Festival, Houston Asian American and Pacific Islander Film Festival, IFFSA Toronto, Ottawa Indian Film Festival, New York Indian Film Festival, USA Film Festival, Roxbury International Film Festival, Nepal America International Film Festival, Middlebury NewFilmmakers Festival, Catalina International Film Festival, Santa Cruz International Film Festival, Film Four Corners Film Festival, Revolution Me Film Festival, Fayetteville Film Festival, Ojai Film Festival, Silicon Valley Asian Film Festival, South Asian Film Festival of America, New Generations Independent Film Festival, Frankfurt.

Omeleto described it by saying that "Difficult People" is a unique and soulful film, whose singular nature emerges gently but confidently as the story unfurls and builds to a subtle and moving ending. The short has a matter-of-fact, even offhand cultural specificity that captures an authentic sense of Mumbai, but at its heart, the arc concerns itself with an emotionally relatable, even universal story about family, love, identity and independence." Nidhi Verma of Platform Magazine described it as " Difficult People deals insight-fully with a father-son relationship after the loss of the mother, the economic constraints of the middle class and the ambition of the artist to break free. The story is deeply rooted in Bombay's cultural ethos, and yet universally highlights the complexity of loss, filial relationships and the difficulties of pursuing one's artistic ambitions."

=== Samir ===
This collaborative project involved nine directors, each directing a specific episode as part of the USC class titled: "Special Problems in Directing." The selection process for this class is highly competitive, with nine directors chosen from USC and assigned a script previously written by nine other writers in the preceding semester.

"Samir" represents a contemporary adaptation of the novel "The Count of Monte Cristo." Notably, the film has been acquired by Warner Brothers for distribution, marking a significant achievement in Sohil Vaidya's filmmaking career.
