= List of 2016 films based on actual events =

This is a list of films and miniseries released in 2016 that are based on actual events. All films on this list are from American production unless indicated otherwise.

== 2016 ==
- 3 Heroines (Indonesian: 3 Srikandi) (2016) – Indonesian biographical sports drama film telling the story of three Indonesian archers (Kusuma Wardhani, Nurfitriyana Saiman and Lilies Handayani) who won Indonesia's first Olympic medal at the 1988 Seoul Olympics
- 13 Hours: The Secret Soldiers of Benghazi (2016) – biographical action war film following six members of Annex Security Team who fought to defend the American diplomatic compound in Benghazi, Libya after waves of attacks by militants on September 11, 2012
- 100 Meters (Spanish: 100 metros) (2016) – Spanish biographical sports film based on the true story of a Ramón Arroyo, a Spanish man with multiple sclerosis who tried to finish an Ironman triathlon –3,8 km swimming, 180 km cycling and 42 km running– after he received his diagnosis and was told that he would not be able to walk 100 meters within a year
- 150 Milligrams (French: La Fille de Brest) (2016) – French biographical drama film based on the true story of French pulmonologist Irène Frachon who became noted for her investigations of the serious side effects and deaths attributed to the diabetes drug Mediator, produced by French manufacturer Laboratoires Servier
- A Prominent Patient (Czech: Masaryk) (2016) – Czech-Slovak biographical drama film based on the life of Jan Masaryk when he was the Czechoslovak ambassador to the United Kingdom
- A Quiet Passion (2016) – British biographical drama film about the life of American poet Emily Dickinson
- A Real Vermeer (Dutch: Een echte Vermeer) (2016) – Dutch biographical drama film about art forger Han van Meegeren directed by Rudolf van den Berg
- A Street Cat Named Bob (2016) – British biographical drama film telling the story of homeless man and former heroin addict, James Bowen and Bob the cat
- A United Kingdom (2016) – biographical romantic drama film based on the true-life romance between Seretse Khama, heir to the throne of Bechuanaland (later Botswana, of which he became president), and his wife Ruth Williams Khama
- A Wedding (French: Noces) (2016) – French-Pakistani crime drama film based on the honour killing of Sadia Sheikh
- The African Doctor (French: Bienvenue à Marly-Gomont) (2016) – French comedy drama film based on the life of Seyolo Zantoko, the father of the musician Kamini
- Afterimage (Polish: Powidoki) (2016) – Polish biographical drama film depicting the story of charismatic painter Władysław Strzemiński, who opposed social realism and maintained his own artistic freedom in spite of political obstacles
- Airlift (Hindi: विमान सेवा) (2016) – Indian Hindi-language action thriller film about a Kuwait-based businessman as he carries out the evacuation of Indians based in Kuwait during the Invasion of Kuwait by Saddam Hussein's Iraq which lead to the beginning of the Gulf War
- All the Way (2016) – biographical drama television film based on events during the presidency of Lyndon B. Johnson
- Alone in Berlin (2016) – German-French-British war drama film based on the story of Otto and Elise Hampel
- Amateur Night (2016) – crime erotic comedy film based on the early experiences of film writers Joe Syracuse and Lisa Addario in Hollywood
- Anna (Hindi: अन्ना: किसन बाबूराव हजारे) (2016) – Indian Hindi-language biographical drama film based on the life of Indian social activist Anna Hazare
- Anthropoid (2016) – British-French war drama film based on the story of Operation Anthropoid, the World War II assassination of Reinhard Heydrich by exile Czechoslovak soldiers Jozef Gabčík and Jan Kubiš on May 27, 1942
- Army of One (2016) – comedy drama film following Gary Faulkner, an ex-construction contractor and unemployed handy man who believes that God has sent him to capture Osama bin Laden in Pakistan
- Athirah (2016) – Indonesian drama film inspired by the life of the mother of Vice President Jusuf Kalla
- Azhar (Hindi: अज़हर) (2016) – Indian Hindi-language biographical sports drama film based on the life of Indian cricketer and former national team captain Mohammad Azharuddin
- Barry (2016) – biographical drama film about Barack Obama's life at Columbia University in 1981
- The Birth of a Nation (2016) – American-Canadian historical drama film based on the story of Nat Turner, the enslaved man who led a slave rebellion in Southampton County, Virginia, in 1831
- Birth of the Dragon (2016) – martial arts action film based on the supposedly true story revolving around the young martial artist Bruce Lee, who challenged kung fu master Wong Jack-man in 1965 in San Francisco
- Bleed for This (2016) – biographical sports film based on the life of former world champion boxer Vinny Paz
- Brain on Fire (2016) – American-Irish biographical drama film telling the true story of a New York Post writer who begins to suffer a mysterious illness and would have been committed to the psychiatric ward and probably died of encephalitis, if it were not for the efforts and skills of Syrian-American neurologist Souhel Najjar
- Brock (2016) – Australian biographical sports miniseries based on the life of motor racing driver Peter Brock
- The Bronx Bull (2016) – biographical sports drama film based on the story of the legendary boxing champion Jake LaMotta and the struggles he faced outside of the boxing ring
- Budhia Singh – Born to Run (Hindi: बुधिया सिंह) (2016) – Indian Hindi-language biographical sports drama film based on the life of Budhia Singh, the world's youngest marathon runner, who ran 48 marathons, when he was only five years old
- Call Me Thief (Afrikaans: Noem My Skollie) (2016) – South African crime drama film based on the life of the film's writer, John W. Fredericks
- Cézanne and I (French: Cézanne et moi) (2016) – French biographical drama film based on the friendship between 19th century novelist Émile Zola and painter Paul Cézanne
- Chocolat (2016) – French drama film loosely based on the real life of Rafael Padilla, a clown who performed in a Paris circus around the 1900s and son of a slave from Cuba, a Spanish colony at the time
- Christine (2016) – British-American biographical drama film about Christine Chubbuck, a news reporter who struggles with depression, along with professional and personal frustrations as she tries to advance her career
- The Chronicles of Melanie (Latvian: Melānijas hronika) (2016) – Latvian biographical drama film based on the real life of Melānija Vanaga
- Chuck (2016) – biographical sports drama film based on the life of heavyweight boxer Chuck Wepner and his 1975 title fight with the heavyweight champion, Muhammad Ali, which inspired Sylvester Stallone's character and screenplay for the 1976 film Rocky
- Churchill's Secret (2016) – British biographical television film depicting how Winston Churchill suffered from a stroke in the summer of 1953
- Confirmation (2016) – political thriller television film about Clarence Thomas' Supreme Court nomination hearings, and the controversy that unfolded when Anita Hill alleged she was sexually harassed by Thomas
- The Conjuring 2 (2016) – supernatural horror film based on purportedly real-life reports that inspired The Amityville Horror story
- Dalida (2016) – French biographical drama film about the life of singer and actress Dalida
- Damilola, Our Loved Boy (2016) – British biographical television film about the events surrounding the 27 November 2000 death of Damilola Taylor
- The Dancer (French: La Danseuse) (2016) – French biographical historical drama film about Loie Fuller
- Dangal (Hindi: दंगल) (2016) – Indian Hindi-language biographical sports drama film based on Mahavir Singh Phogat, a pehlwani amateur wrestler who trains his daughters Geeta Phogat and Babita Kumari to become India's first world-class female wrestlers
- Dark Angel (2016) – British historical drama miniseries about Mary Ann Cotton, widely regarded as Britain's first known female serial killer, who was found guilty of murder in March 1873 for the murder of three of her husbands, allegedly in order to collect on their insurance policies
- The Day Will Come (Danish: Der kommer en dag) (2016) – Danish drama film based on real stories from Godhavn, where lots of boys were victims of violent and sexual abuse and medical neglect
- The Death of Louis XIV (French: La Mort de Louis XIV) (2016) – French historical drama film depicting the final days of Louis XIV of France
- Deepwater Horizon (2016) – biographical disaster film based on the Deepwater Horizon explosion and oil spill in the Gulf of Mexico
- Denial (2016) – biographical court drama film dramatizing the Irving v Penguin Books Ltd case, in which Lipstadt, a Holocaust scholar, was sued by Holocaust denier David Irving for libel
- Devil's Bride (Finnish: Tulen morsian) (2016) – Finnish historical drama film based on the Kastelholm witch trials
- The Devil's Mistress (2016) – Czech-Slovak historical biographical film about Lída Baarová, the mistress of Nazi propaganda minister Joseph Goebbels
- Doctor Rakhmabai (Marathi: डॉक्टर रखमाबाई) (2016) – Indian Marathi-language biographical drama film following the real life story of Doctor Rakhmabai and how she won one of India's first divorce cases and then travelled to the UK to get her medical degree to become India's first female practicing doctor
- Donald Trump's The Art of the Deal: The Movie (2016) – satirical parody film loosely based on the 1987 autobiographical book Trump: The Art of the Deal
- Dongju: The Portrait of a Poet (Korean: 동주) (2016) – South Korean black-and-white biographical period drama film based on the life of poet Yun Dong-ju and his eventual imprisonment by the Japanese government for being involved in the Korean independence movement
- Down by Love (French: Éperdument) (2016) - French drama film based on the life of Sorour Arbabzadeh and Florent Goncalves in 2010
- Down Under (2016) – Australian black comedy drama film based on a true story which happened during the aftermath of the 2005 Cronulla riots
- Durant's Never Closes (2016) – biographical mystery thriller film portraying the story of Jack Durant, notorious restaurateur and ladies man whose connections to the mafia remain a mystery
- Earthquake (Armenian: Երկրաշարժ; Russian: Землетрясение) (2016) – Armenian-Russian disaster drama film based on the 1988 Armenian earthquake
- Egon Schiele: Death and the Maiden (German: Egon Schiele: Death and the Maiden) (2016) – Austrian-Luxembourg biographical film based on the life of Egon Schiele
- Ek Thi Marium (Urdu: اک تھی مریم) (2016) – Pakistani biographical drama television film based on the life of Pakistani female fighter pilot Marium Mukhtiar
- El Amparo (2016) – Colombian-Venezuelan drama film based on the 1988 Massacre of El Amparo, where the Venezuelan army killed several fishermen, accusing them of being Colombian guerillas
- El Inca (2016) – Venezuelan biographical sports drama film about professional boxer Edwin Valero
- Elvis & Nixon (2016) – comedy drama film based on the 21 December 1970 meeting of Elvis Presley and President Richard Nixon at the White House
- Endless Poetry (Spanish: Poesía Sin Fin) (2016) – French-Chilean biographical drama film about Alejandro Jodorowsky's adolescence and youth in the bohemian Matucana neighborhood of Santiago, in the late 1940s and early 1950s
- Ethel & Ernest (2016) – British animated biographical film following Raymond Briggs' parents, Ethel and Ernest, through their period of marriage from the 1920s to their deaths in the 1970s
- Fanny's Journey (French: Le Voyage de Fanny) (2016) – French-Belgian children's war drama film inspired by an autobiographical book by Fanny Ben Ami, a girl escaping the Holocaust
- Finding Altamira (Spanish: Altamira) (2016) – Spanish biographical drama film chronicling the groundbreaking discovery of Stone Age cave paintings in the Cave of Altamira in Cantabria, Spain, and the subsequent controversy by leading religious and scientific figures of the day
- The Finest Hours (2016) – action thriller film based on the historic 1952 United States Coast Guard rescue of the crew of SS Pendleton, after the ship split apart during a nor'easter off the New England coast
- Florence Foster Jenkins (2016) – British-French biographical drama film about Florence Foster Jenkins, a New York heiress known for her poor singing and generosity
- The Founder (2016) – biographical drama film based on a true story about Ray Kroc and the start of the McDonald's franchise
- Free State of Jones (2016) – historical war film inspired by the life of Newton Knight and his armed revolt against the Confederacy in Jones County, Mississippi, throughout the American Civil War
- Genius (2016) – British-American biographical drama film based on the 1978 National Book Award-winner Max Perkins: Editor of Genius by A. Scott Berg
- Goat (2016) – drama film telling the true story of a 19-year-old and his brother who pledge the same fraternity and experience hazing
- Gold (2016) – crime drama film based on the true story of the 1993 Bre-X mining scandal, when a massive gold deposit was supposedly discovered in the jungles of Indonesia
- Greater (2016) – biographical sports film about American football player Brandon Burlsworth, a walk-on college player who became an All-American, dying in a car crash 11 days after being drafted high in the 3rd round to the National Football League
- Guernica (Spanish: Gernika) (2016) – Spanish-British-American war drama film about the 1937 bombing of Guernica
- Guerrero (2016) – Peruvian biographical sports drama film telling the story of soccer player Paolo Guerrero
- Hacksaw Ridge (2016) – American-Australian biographical war film focusing on the World War II experiences of Desmond Doss, an American pacifist combat medic who, as a Seventh-day Adventist Christian, refused to carry or use a weapon or firearm of any kind
- Hands of Stone (2016) – biographical sports film about the career of Panamanian former professional boxer Roberto Durán
- The Happiest Day in the Life of Olli Mäki (Finnish: Hymyilevä mies) (2016) – Finnish biographical drama film telling the true story of Olli Mäki, the famous Finnish boxer who had a shot at the 1962 World Featherweight title
- Harley and the Davidsons (2016) – biographical drama miniseries dramatizing the origins of motorcycle manufacturer Harley-Davidson, and how Arthur Davidson founded the company together with his brothers Walter Davidson, Sr. and William A. Davidson, along with their childhood friend William S. Harley
- Hatton Garden: the Heist (2016) – British heist action film based on the true story of the Hatton Garden safe deposit burglary in Hatton Garden, London, in April 2015, carried out by a group of elderly career criminals
- Hidden Figures (2016) – biographical drama film about African American female mathematicians who worked at the National Aeronautics and Space Administration (NASA) during the Space Race
- I, Olga Hepnarová (Czech: Já, Olga Hepnarová) (2016) – Czech crime drama film about Olga Hepnarová, a Czech mass murderer, who on 10 July 1973, killed eight people with a truck in Prague, Czechoslovakia
- I'm Gilda (Spanish: Gilda, no me arrepiento de este amor) (2016) – Argentine biographical drama film about the life of tropical singer and songwriter Gilda
- I'm Not Ashamed (2016) – biographical drama film based on the journals of Rachel Scott, the first victim of the 1999 Columbine High School massacre in Columbine, Colorado
- The Icebreaker (Russian: Ледокол) (2016) – Russian disaster film based in part on the real events that occurred in 1985 with the icebreaker Mikhail Somov, which was trapped by Antarctic ice and spent 133 days in forced drift
- Ignacio de Loyola (2016) – Philippine historical biographical drama film based on the memoirs of Ignatius of Loyola, founder of the Jesuit order who was canonized as a saint in the Catholic Church
- In Plain Sight (2016) – British crime thriller miniseries covering the crimes committed by serial killer Peter Manuel in Lanarkshire, Scotland in the 1950s
- The Infiltrator (2016) – biographical crime thriller film based on the eponymous autobiography by Robert Mazur, a U.S. Customs special agent, who in the 1980s helped bust Pablo Escobar's money-laundering organization by going undercover as a corrupt businessman
- The Innocents (French: Les Innocentes) (2016) – French-Polish-Belgian drama film inspired by the experiences of Madeleine Pauliac, a French Red Cross doctor who worked in Poland after World War II
- Inseparables (2016) – Argentine comedy drama film inspired by the true story of Philippe Pozzo di Borgo and his French-Algerian caregiver Abdel Sellou
- Italian Race (Italian: Veloce come il vento) (2016) – Italian sports drama film loosely based on the true story of rally driver Carlo Capone
- Jackie (2016) – biographical drama film following Jacqueline "Jackie" Kennedy in the days when she was First Lady in the White House and her life immediately following the assassination of her husband, United States President John F. Kennedy, in 1963
- Joe Cinque's Consolation (2016) – Australian drama film based on the separate trials of Anu Singh and her friend Madhavi Rao, who were accused of murdering Singh's boyfriend Joe Cinque
- The Journey (2016) – British-Irish drama film depicting a fictional account of the true story of how political enemies Ian Paisley and Martin McGuinness formed an unlikely political alliance
- Juana Inés (2016) – Mexican biographical miniseries based on the life and work of Sor Juana Inés de la Cruz
- Kalinka (French: Au nom de ma fille) (2016) – French-German crime drama film based on the true story of the Kalinka Bamberski case which took place in 1982
- Kalushi (2016) – South African biographical drama film about Solomon Kalushi Mahlangu, a nineteen-year-old hawker from the streets of Mamelodi, a township outside Pretoria in South Africa
- Killing Reagan (2016) – biographical television film depicting John Hinkley's 1981 assassination attempt against U.S. president Ronald Reagan
- Killing Veerappan (Kannada: ಕೊಲ್ಲುವುದು ವೀರಪ್ಪನ್) (2016) – Indian Kannada-language biographical crime film based on the events leading to Operation Cocoon to capture or kill Indian bandit Veerappan
- King Cobra (2016) – biographical drama film about the life and early career of gay pornographic film actor Sean Paul Lockhart
- The King's Choice (Norwegian: Kongens nei) (2016) – Norwegian biographical war film focusing on King Haakon VII and the Norwegian royal family in the days before and immediately after the German invasion of Norway in April 1940
- Laal Rang (Hindi: लाल रंग) (2016) – Indian Hindi-language black comedy crime drama film depicting the theft of blood from blood banks and how the lives of two friends involved in the trade get affected, based on true events
- The Last Descent (2016) – biographical survival drama film based on the 2009 rescue attempt of John Edward Jones in Nutty Putty Cave, west of Utah Lake
- The Last Family (Polish: Ostatnia rodzina) (2016) – Polish biographical film depicting the true story of the artistic Beksinski family: Zdzisław, his wife Zofia and their talented yet trouble-making son Tomasz
- The Last Princess (Korean: 덕혜옹주) (2016) – South Korean historical drama film about Princess Deokhye, the last princess of the Joseon Dynasty
- LBJ (2016) – political drama film about the beginning of the presidency of United States President Lyndon B. Johnson following the assassination of United States President John F. Kennedy
- The Legend of Ben Hall (2016) – Australian bushranger film, based on the exploits of bushranger Ben Hall
- The Lennon Report (2016) – biographical drama film about the night John Lennon was shot and killed
- The Lighthouse of the Orcas (Spanish: El faro de las orcas) (2016) – Spanish-Argentine drama film about a mother travels with her autistic son to Patagonia to meet a park ranger and wild orcas
- Lion (2016) – Australian-British biographical drama film based on the true story of how Saroo Brierley, 25 years after being separated from his family in India, sets out to find them
- Little Secret (Portuguese: Pequeno Segredo) (2016) – Brazilian-New Zealand drama film inspired by a true story involving David Schurmann's adopted sister
- The Lost City of Z (2016) – epic biographical adventure drama film based on the story of Percy Fawcett, who was sent to Brazil and made several attempts to find a supposed ancient lost city in the Amazon
- Loving (2016) – biographical romantic drama film which tells the story of Richard and Mildred Loving, the plaintiffs in the 1967 U.S. Supreme Court (the Warren Court) decision Loving v. Virginia, which invalidated state laws prohibiting interracial marriage
- Madoff (2016) – biographical crime miniseries about the Madoff investment scandal, a fraud scheme perpetrated by Bernie Madoff, a former stockbroker, investment advisor, and financier
- Mah e Mir (Urdu: ماہ میر) (2016) – Pakistani biographical film based on the life of the famous poet Mir Taqi Mir
- Mandela's Gun (2016) – South African biographical drama film about Nelson Mandela's experience as a guerrilla fighter for the African National Congress
- Marie Curie: The Courage of Knowledge (Polish: Maria Skłodowska-Curie) (2016) – Polish biographical drama film detailing the life of Marie Curie from 1904 to 1911
- Masterminds (2016) – crime comedy film based on the October 1997 Loomis Fargo robbery in North Carolina
- Maudie (2016) – Irish-Canadian biographical drama film about the life of folk artist Maud Lewis, who painted in Nova Scotia
- Miracles from Heaven (2016) – religious drama film depicting the true story of Annabel Beam who had a near-death experience and was later cured of an incurable disease
- Molly (2016) – Australian biographical miniseries about Australian music personality Molly Meldrum
- M.S. Dhoni: The Untold Story (Hindi: एम एस धोनी द अनटोल्ड स्टोरी) (2016) – Indian Hindi-language biographical sports drama film based on the life of former Test, ODI and T20I captain of the Indian national cricket team, Mahendra Singh Dhoni
- Much Ado About Nothing (Spanish: Aquí no ha pasado nada) (2016) – Chilean drama film inspired by a real-life political scandal in Chile
- Murder in Polná (Czech: Zločin v Polné) (2016) – Czech historical crime television film that deals with Hilsner Affair
- Murdered by My Father (2016) – British crime drama television film telling the story of an honour killing of a British Asian Muslim teenage girl by her father
- Neerja (Hindi: नीरजा) (2016) – Indian Hindi-language biographical thriller film based on the attempted hijacking of Pan Am Flight 73 in Karachi, Pakistan by Libyan-backed Abu Nidal Organization on 5 September 1986
- Nelly (2016) – biographical drama film based on Nelly Arcan, an award-winning Canadian author and former sex worker who committed suicide in 2009
- Neruda (2016) – biographical drama film depicting the dramatic events of the suppression of Communists in Chile in 1948 and how the poet Pablo Neruda had to go on the run, eventually escaping on horseback over the Andes
- The Night Stalker (2016) – biographical drama film about the serial killer Richard Ramirez
- Nina (2016) – biographical drama film about American musician and civil rights activist Nina Simone
- NSU German History X (German: Mitten in Deutschland: NSU) (2016) – German historical drama miniseries dramatizing the true events and characters of the National Socialist Underground, a neo-Nazi German terrorist group that was uncovered in November 2011
- The Odyssey (French: L'Odyssée) (2016) – French-Belgian biographical adventure film based on Jacques-Yves Cousteau, a French ocean-going adventurer, biologist, and filmmaker
- Ola Bola (2016) – Malaysian sport drama film inspired by the glories of the Malaysia national football team which successfully entered the 1980 Summer Olympics
- On Wings of Eagles (2016) – American-Chinese-Hong Kong historical sport drama film about Eric Liddell's experiences returning to war-torn China
- Operation Chromite (Korean: 인천상륙작전) (2016) – South Korean spy war film based on a true story of the preparatory stage of Operation Chromite (Incheon Landing Operation, Battle of Inchon) in the Korean War
- Operation Mekong (Chinese: 湄公河行动) (2016) – Chinese-Thai crime action film based on the 2011 Mekong River massacre
- Panfilov's 28 Men (Russian: 28 панфиловцев) (2016) – Russian war drama film based on a legend about a group of soldiers – Panfilov's Twenty-Eight Guardsmen – heroically halting and destroying German tanks headed for Moscow
- Patriots Day (2016) – action thriller film about the Boston Marathon bombings in 2013 and the subsequent terrorist manhunt
- Paula (2016) – German biographical drama film depicting the life of pioneering female painter Paula Modersohn-Becker
- Pawo (2016) – German-Indian-Chinese Tibetan-language loosely based on late Jamphel Yeshi who self-immolated in protest against human right violations in Tibet
- Pelé: Birth of a Legend (2016) – biographical sports film about the early life of Brazilian footballer Pelé and his journey with Brazil to win the 1958 FIFA World Cup
- The People v. O. J. Simpson: American Crime Story (2016) – true crime drama miniseries revolving around the O. J. Simpson murder case
- The Ploy (Italian: La macchinazione) (2016) – Italian biographical drama film based on the last hours of Pier Paolo Pasolini's life before his murder
- The Promise (2016) – epic historical drama film set in the final years of the Ottoman Empire
- Pyromaniac (Norwegian: Pyromanen) (2016) – Norwegian mystery drama film inspired by actual events in 1978 rural Norway
- Queen of Katwe (2016) – biographical sports drama film based on the life of Phiona Mutesi, a girl living in Katwe, a slum of Kampala, the capital of Uganda who learns to play chess and becomes a Woman Candidate Master after her victories at World Chess Olympiads
- Race (2016) – biographical sports drama film about African American athlete Jesse Owens, who won a record-breaking four gold medals at the 1936 Berlin Olympic Games
- The Rack Pack (2016) – British comedy drama film about professional snooker during the 1970s through the 1980s, focusing on the intense rivalry between Alex Higgins and Steve Davis
- Ramabai (Kannada: ರಮಾಬಾಯಿ) (2016) – Indian Kannada-language biographical film based on the life of Ramabai Ambedkar, the first wife of Indian social reformer and politician B. R. Ambedkar
- Rara (2016) – Chilean-Argentine coming-of-age comedy based on the true story of a judge who lost a custody battle because of her sexual orientation
- Red Dog: True Blue (2016) – Australian family comedy film detailing the early days of the Red Dog, the Pilbara Wanderer
- Reg (2016) – British biographical drama television film about the campaign by Reg Keys to obtain answers following the death of his son Tom in the Iraq War
- Rillington Place (2016) – British biographical crime drama miniseries about the real life case of serial killer John Christie, and the subsequent wrongful execution of Timothy Evans
- Riphagen (2016) – Dutch drama film about Dries Riphagen, a Dutch criminal who collaborated with Nazi Germany
- Rudy Habibie (2016) – Indonesian biographical historical drama film about B. J. Habibie
- Rustom (Hindi: रुस्तम) (2016) – Indian Hindi-language crime drama film based on the K. M. Nanavati v. State of Maharashtra court case
- Salute (2016) – Pakistani biographical film based on the life of martyr Aitzaz Hasan who confronted a suicide bomber, preventing his attempt to detonate a bomb in his school, saving roughly 2000 lives
- Santa Maria della Salute (2016) – Serbian biographical film about the Serbian poet Laza Kostić
- Sarbjit (Hindi: सरबजीत) (2016) – Indian Hindi-language biographical drama film based on Sarabjit Singh, an Indian man who was sentenced to death by the Supreme Court of Pakistan in 1991 and who consequently spent 22 years in prison for alleged terrorism and spying
- The Secret (2016) – British crime drama miniseries about the double murder of Lesley Howell and Constable Trevor Buchanan, whose bodies were discovered in a fume-filled car in the garage of a property in Castlerock, County Londonderry, in Northern Ireland in May 1991
- She Has a Name (2016) – Canadian thriller drama film about the trafficking of children into sexual slavery and was inspired by the deaths of 54 people in the Ranong human-trafficking incident
- Shepherds and Butchers (2016) – South African drama film about a lawyer who takes on a case of a prison guard in South Africa who is traumatized by the executions he's witnessed, based on real events
- The Siege of Jadotville (2016) – Irish-South African action war film about an Irish Army unit's role in the titular Siege of Jadotville during the United Nations Operation in the Congo in September 1961, part of the Congo Crisis that stretched from 1960 to 1965
- Silence (Japanese: 沈黙 -サイレンス-) (2016) – American-Japanese epic historical drama film following two 17th-century Jesuit priests who travel from Portugal to Edo period Japan via Macau to locate their missing mentor and spread Catholic Christianity, based on the historical Italian figure Giuseppe Chiara
- Smoke & Mirrors (Spanish: El hombre de las mil caras) (2016) – Spanish thriller film about Francisco Paesa, a former agent of the Spanish secret service who faked his own death after an infamous corruption scandal
- Snowden (2016) – biographical thriller film about Edward Snowden, a Central Intelligence Agency (CIA) subcontractor and whistleblower who copied and leaked highly classified information from the National Security Agency (NSA) beginning in 2013
- Solo, Solitude (Indonesian: Istirahatlah Kata-Kata) (2016) – Indonesian biographical drama film about disappeared activist and poet Widji Thukul
- Southside with You (2016) – biographical romantic drama film focusing on the Barack Obama and Michelle Robinson's first date in 1989
- Spirit of the Game (2016) – biographical drama film based on the true story of the Mormon Yankees, an American basketball team which played in exhibition games before the 1956 Summer Olympics
- Standing in the Dust (Persian: ایستاده در غبار) (2016) – Iranian biographical drama film about Ahmad Motevaselian, an Iranian commander in the Iran-Iraq war, who disappeared in Lebanon
- Starfish (2016) – British drama film following a family who are thrown into turmoil when the husband contracts sepsis, based on a true story
- Stefan Zweig: Farewell to Europe (German: Vor der Morgenröte) (2016) – German-Austrian biographical drama film charting the years of exile in the life of famous Jewish Austrian writer Stefan Zweig
- Strangled (Hungarian: A martfűi rém) (2016) – Hungarian neo-noir crime film adapted from the story of Péter Kovács, a serial killer in Hungary during the 1960s, under the rule of the communist party
- Stronger Than the World (Portuguese: Mais Forte que o Mundo - A História de José Aldo) (2016) – Brazilian biographical sports drama film about the life of MMA fighter José Aldo
- Sully (2016) – biographical drama film about Chesley "Sully" Sullenberger's January 2009 emergency landing of US Airways Flight 1549 on the Hudson River, in which all 155 passengers and crew survived—most suffering only minor injuries—and the subsequent publicity and investigation
- Surviving Compton: Dre, Suge & Michel'le (2016) – biographical drama television film based on the true story of R&B singer, Michel'le
- Tamara (2016) – Venezuelan romantic drama film inspired by the life of Tamara Adrián, the first transgender person elected to the National Assembly of Venezuela and the second transgender member of a national legislature in the Americas
- Team Spirit (French: L'Outsider) (2016) – French biographical drama film based on the true life story of Jérôme Kerviel, a French trader who was convicted in the 2008 Société Générale trading loss for breach of trust, forgery and unauthorized use of the bank's computers, resulting in losses valued at €4.9 billion
- To Walk Invisible (2016) – British biographical television film focusing on the relationship of the three Brontë sisters; Charlotte, Emily and Anne, and their brother, Branwell.
- Tommy's Honour (2016) – British-American historical drama film depicting the lives and careers of, and the complex relationship between, the pioneering Scottish golfing champions Old Tom Morris and his son Young Tom Morris
- Toni Braxton: Unbreak My Heart (2016) – biographical television film about R&B singer Toni Braxton
- Tutankhamun (2016) – British adventure drama miniseries based on the discovery of Tutankhamun's tomb by Howard Carter
- Unclaimed (2016) – Canadian drama television film examining the years leading to serial killer Robert Pickton's arrest and the court proceedings before his conviction
- USS Indianapolis: Men of Courage (2016) – war disaster film based on the true story of the loss of the ship of the same name in the closing stages of the Second World War
- Vangaveeti (Telugu: వంగవీటి) (2016) – Indian Telugu-language biographical action film based on the life of politician Vangaveeti Mohana Ranga, and his elder brother Vangaveeti Radha Krishna and their altercation with communist dominated Vijayawada of the 1970s-80s in Andhra Pradesh
- Veerappan (Hindi: वीरप्पन) (2016) – Indian Hindi-language biographical crime film based on the real-life Indian bandit Veerappan and the events leading to Operation Cocoon, a mission to capture and kill him
- Viking (Russian: Викинг) (2016) – Russian historical film about medieval prince Vladimir the Great, Prince of Novgorod
- War Dogs (2016) – biographical black comedy crime drama film about two arms dealers, Efraim Diveroli and David Packouz, who receive a U.S. Army contract to supply ammunitions for the Afghan National Army worth approximately $300 million
- Weeds on Fire (Chinese: 點五步) – Hong Kong sports drama film portraying the true story of the Shatin Martins, the first baseball team from Hong Kong to win a league
- Whiskey Tango Foxtrot (2016) – biographical war comedy drama film based on journalist Kim Barker's experiences covering the war in Afghanistan
- Xuanzang (Mandarin: 大唐玄奘) (2016) – Chinese historical adventure film based on Xuanzang's seventeen-year overland journey to India during the Tang dynasty in the seventh century
- Year by the Sea (2016) – comedy drama film about Joan Anderson and her quest to reclaim who she was before marriage and children
