= Hiware Bazar =

Village in Maharashtra

- Location in Maharashtra Hiware Bazar (India) Hiware Bazar (Asia)
- Coordinates: 19°4′7″N 74°36′4″E
- Country: India
- State: Maharashtra
- Region: North Maharashtra
- Division: Nashik
- District: Ahmednagar
- Taluka: Nagar
- Demonym: Hiware Bazarkar
- Time zone: UTC+5:30 (IST)
- Pincode: 414103
- Vehicle registration: MH–16
- Official language: Marathi

Hiware Bazar is a village in the Ahmednagar District of Maharashtra, India. It is noted for its irrigation system and water conservation program, with which it has fought the drought and drinking water problems.

== History ==
The village experienced mass exodus during the severe drought in 1972. However the village experienced a turnaround after 1989, Popatrao Baguji Pawar, the only postgraduate in the village won the post of gram panchayat sarpanch unopposed. He managed to get the illicit 22 liquor retail outlets closed, secure bank loans for farmers and started rainwater harvesting, water conservation and management programs, which involved building 52 earthen bunds, percolation tanks, 32 stone bunds and nine check dams. Its development plan was based on village Ralegan Siddhi, 35 km away, also in the same district, turned around by Anna Hazare. By the 1990s, reverse migration started as families started returning home. In 2012, the village with its 235 families and an overall population of 1,250, had a monthly per capita income Rs 30,000, up from Rs. 830 in 1995, plus it had 60 families with an annual income of over 10 Lakh rupees.

In 2012, the joint state and central government plan was announced to establish a national-level centre for training in panchayati raj system for watershed development, sanitation and capacity building at the village, to be built at a cost of Rs 12-crore.

== Conservation and social change program ==
Hiware Bazar lies in the drought-prone Ahmednagar district. Prior to 1989, the village was facing several problems such as migration of the villagers to the nearby urban areas, high crime and scarcity of water.

In 1990, after Popatrao Baguji Pawar was elected as the sarpanch (village chief), the village used funds from government schemes and launched a program to recover its past glory. The village is conceptualized and planned after Ralegan Siddhi, another village noted for its conservational initiatives.

The villagers implemented a drip-irrigation system to conserve water and soil, and to increase the food production. They avoided crops like sugarcane and bananas, which require a high use of water. The program included rainwater harvesting, digging trenches around the hill contours to trap water, afforestation and building of percolation tanks. These initiatives were complemented by a program for social change, which included a ban on liquor, adoption of family planning, mandating HIV/AIDS testing before marriages and shramdaan (voluntary labour for development of the village).

The initiatives greatly improved the socio-economic conditions in the village, and the village was declared an "Ideal Village" by the Government of Maharashtra. At the "National Ground Water Congress" in New Delhi on 11 September 2007, the village received the "National Water Award" by the Government of India.

In 1995, only a tenth of the village's land was arable and 168 of its 182 families were below the poverty line. By 2010, the average income of the village had increased twenty-fold: 50 of the villagers had become millionaires (in Indian rupees), and only three families were below the poverty line. The grass harvest increased from 100 tonnes in 2000 to 6,000 tonnes in 2004, and the milk production rose from 150 litres a day in the mid-1990s to 4,000 in 2010.

The government even provided them with four bandis 1.Kurhad bandi 2.Charai bandi 3.Nasha bandi 4.Nas bandi
