= Popatrao Baguji Pawar =

Farmer

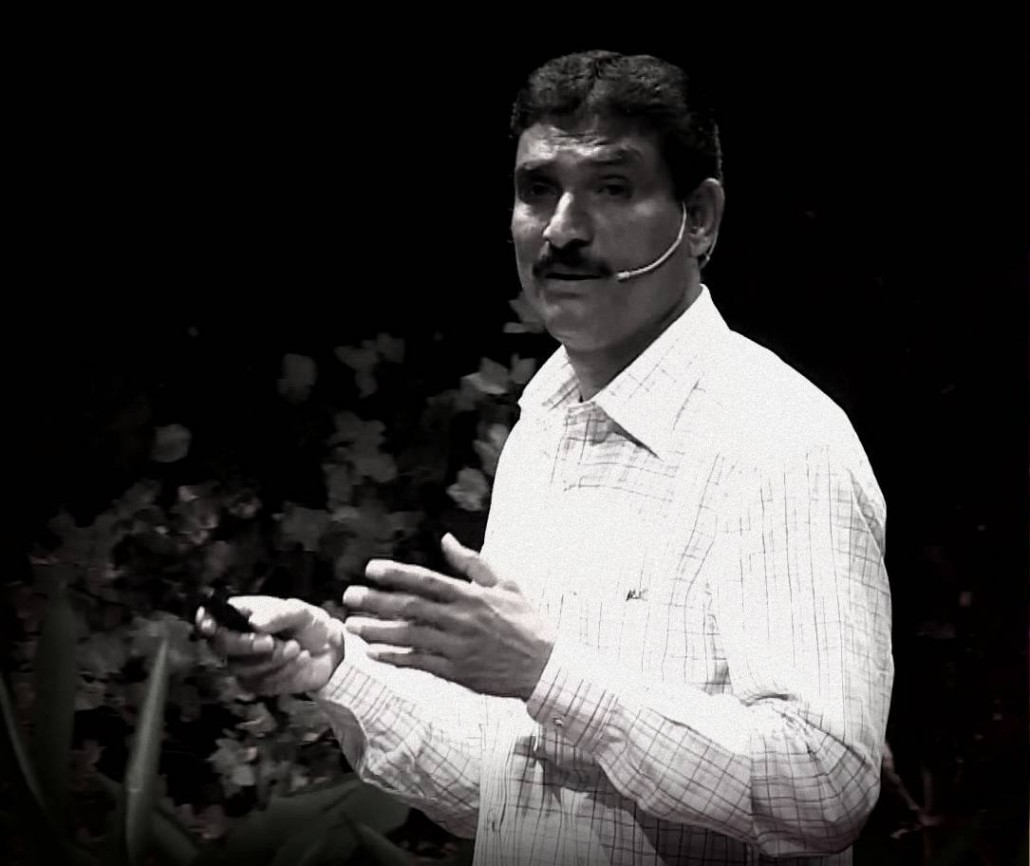
- Citizenship: Indian
- Known for: Social Work
- Awards: Padma Shri (2020)

Popatrao Baguji Pawar (born 1960) is the former sarpanch of Hiware Bazar, a gram panchayat in Ahliyanagar district of Maharashtra India. He was the only post graduate in the village. In 2020, he received the Padma Shri honour from the Government of India for his contribution in the field of social work.

He is the Executive Director of Maharashtra state government's Model Village programme. He is credited to have transformed it from an impoverished village into a model of development that the government of Maharashtra wishes to implement across the state.

Pawar led Hiware Bazar's transformation from a drought- prone village to a green and prosperous model village, thus successfully reproducing Anna Hazare's Ralegaon Siddhi model of village development. He featured in an India Today cover story as the person who demonstrated how rural water resources could be revived.

The Hiware bazare gram panchayat, with Pawar as its sarpanch, won the first National Award for community led water conservation in 2007.

In an interview with Nikhil Wagle on IBN Lokmat, Pawar describes his entry into public life as an accident. In relation to the control of malaria he is quoted to have said "Show me one mosquito (in Hiware bazar) and take away Rs 100." He speaks regularly at Policy BootCamp, a flagship summer school in public policy conducted by Vision India Foundation.
