= Stephen M. Irwin =

Australian screenwriter, producer and novelist (born 1966)

Stephen M Irwin (born December, 1966) is an Australian screenwriter, producer and novelist, best known for Harrow (2018) and Secrets & Lies (2014).

== Biography ==
Irwin was born in Brisbane, Queensland and is the second youngest of six children. He graduated from the Queensland College of Art with tertiary qualifications in Film and Television production. Irwin continues to live in Brisbane and centres many of his stories in fictionalised Brisbane settings.

== Films & Television ==
Title	Date	Medium	Notes
Harrow Season 2	2019	TV series - ABC/ABCSi.	Writer/Producer. Starring Ioan Gruffudd, Jolene Anderson
Tidelands	2018	TV series - Netflix	Writer. Starring Charlotte Best, Mattias Inwood, Aaron Jakubenko, Elsa Pataky, Peter O'Brien
Harrow Season 1	2018	TV series - ABC/ABCSi.	Writer/Producer. Starring Ioan Gruffudd, Mirrah Foulkes Remy Hii
Wake in Fright	2017	TV mini-series	Writer. Silver World Medal – New York Festivals Film & Television Awards (2018)
Australia Day	2017	Feature - Foxtel	Writer. Starring Bryan Brown, Shari Sebbens, Isabelle Cornish, Sean Keenan, Daniel Webber, Matthew Le Nevez.
Secrets & Lies (U.S. TV series)	2015–2016	TV series	Based upon the Australian television series created by Stephen M. Irwin. Starring Ryan Phillippe, Juliette Lewis, KaDee Strickland, Michael Ealy.
Secrets & Lies (Australian TV series)	2014	TV series	Writer. Starring Martin Henderson, Anthony Hayes. Australian Writers Guild AWGIE Winner– Interactive Media (2015)
Ascension	2008	Short	Writer/Director. (Best Short, Sci-Fi-London 2008)
Car Pool	2006	Short	Writer. Starring Kerry Armstrong. (Best Comedy, St Kilda Short Film Festival 2007
Black Fury	2005	Short	Writer/Director.
The Kool-Sla Cover-up	2003	TV Drama	Writer/Director. SBS (S)truth.
Boggo Road 4102	2001	Documentary	Writer/Director.
Boulia 4829	2000	Documentary	Writer/Director.

== Novels ==
Irwin is the author of two supernatural thrillers The Dead Path (2010) and The Broken Ones (2011). The Dead Path was named Top Horror Title in the American Library Association's 2011 reading list and won the Doubleday Book of the Month Club First Fiction Award 2010.

== Short Stories & Poetry ==
Irwin has written several short stories and poems, winning awards both Australia and overseas including The Write Stuff and New Millennium Writings.

Title	Year	Medium	Publication	Notes
24/7	2013	Short Story	Anthology - A Killer Among Demons	Dark Prints Press
Surprise	2013	Short Story	Anthology - Warbirds of Mars	Quickdraw Books
Tail the Barney	2011	Short Story	Anthologies - Rage Against the Night; New Millennium Writings	
Hive	2013	Short Story	Anthology - Macabre - A Journey Through Australia's Darkest Fears	Winner, Book of the Month Club First Fiction Award (2011)
Bones of the Hill	2007	Poetry	Anthology - eclogues	Newcastle Poetry Prize Anthology
The Jet	2005	Poetry	Anthology - sunweight	Newcastle Poetry Prize Anthology
She Lay Among Diamonds	2005	Short Story	N/A	Winner, Katherine Susannah Pritchard Short Story Award
Emily's Breath	2005	Short Story	N/A	Winner, Easter Writer's Group Short Story Competition
