= The Birth Canal =

The Birth Canal may refer to:

- The Vagina
- A passage of Nutty Putty Cave
