= Mormon Yankees =

- Leagues: Independent
- Founded: 1937
- History: 1937–1961
- Arena: Family entertainment
- Location: Australia

The Mormon Yankees were an exhibition basketball team in Australia from 1937 to 1961. Composed of young missionaries from The Church of Jesus Christ of Latter-day Saints, the team played all over Australia and became widely known. One Mormon Yankees squad played exhibition games against International teams preparing for the 1956 Summer Olympics, which were held in Australia that year.

== History ==
James Naismith invented the game of basketball as part of his job at YMCA. The phrase muscular Christianity was born as a description for using recreation for religious purposes in the early 1900s. Other churches followed suit, and by the 1930s, missionaries for the Church of Jesus Christ of Latter-day Saints (LDS) were using basketball to build bridges in various countries and communities.

Beginning in 1937, LDS missionaries started playing regular organized games. The Harlem Globetrotters had just toured Australia and spurred interest in basketball—an interest noticed by the Mission President Charles V. Liljenquist. Elder Loren C. Dunn, former captain of the Mormon Yankees team in 1954, recalled, "after the Globetrotters visited Adelaide, President Liljenquist held a press conference and told the reporters, 'We've got somebody coming who's better than the Globetrotters'." Liljenquist was referring to Dunn and assigned him to organize a competitive team of missionaries.

The missionary basketball team, dubbed the "Mormon Yankees", became stars. They were so popular and well known that the International Olympic Committee approached the team about playing against Olympic basketball teams in Australia. They played the Australian team often, and also started training the Australian basketball players. They also competed against other countries in Australia preparing for the Olympic Games. They played the Russians, Chinese (Taiwanese), Chilean, French, American and Australian Olympic teams, defeating all but the Russians and the Americans, who eventually won the Olympic silver and gold medals respectively. After the Olympics, the Mormon Yankees then traveled to Tasmania and played three exhibition games against the Chinese team, winning two out of three games.

The Mormon Yankees had a positive effect for the LDS Church over the next two and a half decades. Several positive articles were published that dispelled myths about the church. During the peak of the Mormon Yankees' popularity, 1955 to 1960, the LDS Church in Australia tripled in size. The Yankees were influential among athletes as well, as examples in living a clean life, and not smoking or drinking.

== Film adaption ==
Spirit of the Game is a 2016 feature film which told the story of the Mormon Yankees, starring Aaron Jakubenko as DeLyle Condie.
