= Will (TV series) =

2017 American drama television series

- Genre: Historical drama
- Created by: Craig Pearce
- Starring: Laurie Davidson; Olivia DeJonge; Ewen Bremner; Mattias Inwood; Jamie Campbell Bower; William Houston; Lukas Rolfe; Colm Meaney; Max Bennett; Vauxhall Jermaine
- Country of origin: United States
- Original language: English
- No. of seasons: 1
- No. of episodes: 10

Production
- Executive producers: Howard Braunstein; Vince Gerardis; Debra Hayward; Shekhar Kapur; Alison Owen; Craig Pearce; Louise Rosager
- Producers: Andrew Wood; Jill Bilcock; Mary Richards
- Cinematography: Erik Wilson
- Running time: 47–57 minutes
- Production companies: Monumental Television; Startling Television; Sir Weighty Tomes Enterprises; Studio T

Original release
- Network: TNT
- Release: July 10 – September 4, 2017

Will is an historical fiction television series about the life of William Shakespeare in his early 20s. The series was ordered for a first season, consisting of ten episodes, on May 18, 2016. It premiered on TNT on July 10, 2017, and concluded on September 4, 2017. It was originally ordered to series at Pivot in 2013 but was never broadcast. On September 5, 2017, the series was canceled after one season.

== Plot ==
Young William Shakespeare is a struggling playwright who tires of making gloves in order to support his wife and three children. He travels to London and sells one of his plays to a theatre owned by James Burbage. In doing so, he befriends the rest of the company, pushes out the previous playwright and falls in love with Burbage's daughter, Alice. While seeking fame and fortune in London, Will keeps his Catholicism secret from those who would threaten to kill him and exploit his connection to the wanted Robert Southwell. As he makes a name for himself, he finds that he is saddled with saving a dying theater company and finding a place in a city that is hostile to his religion.

== Cast ==
=== Main ===
- Laurie Davidson as William Shakespeare
- Olivia DeJonge as Alice Burbage
- Ewen Bremner as Richard Topcliffe
- Mattias Inwood as Richard Burbage
- Jamie Campbell Bower as Christopher Marlowe
- William Houston as Kemp
- Lukas Rolfe as Presto
- Max Bennett as Robert Southwell
- Colm Meaney as James Burbage

=== Recurring ===
- Nancy Carroll as Ellen Burbage
- Michael Nardone as Edward Arden
- Jamie Beamish as Augustine Phillips
- Nicholas Farrell as Francis Walsingham
- Edward Hayter as Sir Thomas Walsingham
- Nicholas Woodeson as Philip Henslowe
- Henry Lloyd-Hughes as Edward Alleyn
- Bruce MacKinnon as Robert Greene
- Deirdre Mullins as Anne Shakespeare
- James Berkery as Jeremy Knightstand
- Zubin Varla as Edward Kelley
- Jasmin Savoy Brown as Emilia Bassano
- Kenneth Collard as Justice Young
- Leon Annor as Marcus
- Vauxhall Jermaine as Demetrius
- Kristy Philipps as Apelina
- Ben Fox as John Shakespeare
- Tadhg Murphy as Baxter
- Amanda Lawrence as Mary Shakespeare
- Michael Elwyn as Lord Hunsdon
- Will Irvine as Samuel Ward
- Dean-Charles Chapman as Billy Cooper

== Episodes ==
No.	Title	Directed by	Written by	Original release date	US viewers (millions)
1	"The Play's The Thing"	Shekhar Kapur	Craig Pearce	July 10, 2017	0.633
In 1589, young upstart actor/playwright William Shakespeare, a Catholic from the small town of Stratford, arrives in wild and turbulent London during a time of religious turmoil. With nothing more than a dream, a way with words, and a mysterious letter, he joins a local theater troupe and co-writes the play Edward III to a warm reception. Thanks to a mysterious benefactor in Christopher Marlowe, a star is born.
2	"Cowards Die Many Times"	Shekhar Kapur	Craig Pearce	July 10, 2017	0.477
Plagued with guilt over the arrest of fellow playwright Baxter, whom Marlowe set up, Will confesses to Alice about his family ties to Catholic priest Father Robert Southwell. Later, the theatre's future is threatened when a rival playhouse, The Rose, offers the crowd-pleasing actor Kemp a better role, forcing Will to offer to write a play just for him. Opening quote: "Cowards die many times before their deaths, The valiant never taste of death but once." – Julius Caesar
3	"The Two Gentlemen"	Shekhar Kapur	Story by : Louise Fox & Craig Pearce; Teleplay by : Craig Pearce & Jacquelin Perske	July 17, 2017	0.471
After writing a dull script, Will is thrown out of Burbage's theatre and left penniless. However, he has an epiphany that there are hidden patterns in successful plays which could give him inspiration. Alice helps him write a better play by stealing the plot from a Spanish book. The Two Gentlemen of Verona is performed at the theatre and Will is paid for his services. Also, he secretly meets his cousin Father Southwell, who proposes a dangerous collaboration, that Will help him finish writing his treatise to the queen about Catholics attaining religious freedom. Opening quote: "Those friends thou hast, And their adoption tried, Grapple them to thy soul with hoops of steel..." – Hamlet
4	"Brave New World"	Elliott Lester	Cat Jones	July 24, 2017	0.368
Riding the coattails of his new fame, Will allows Marlowe to introduce him to London's social elite. But, the frolic takes a macabre turn when he partakes in astronomer John Dee's divination ritual. Alice learns the truth about the secret manifest. Will is taken in for questioning by Topcliffe, who intends to use Will as a weapon in the war against the papacy by having him write an anti-Catholic play to counter Southwell's propaganda. Opening quote: "I would give all my fame for a pot of ale and safety." – Henry V
5	"The Marriage of True Minds"	Elliott Lester	Craig Pearce & Jacquelin Perske	July 31, 2017	0.300
An unexpected arrival by Will's wife Anne sends Will's world in London spinning out of control. He has to choose between his family and Alice. Meanwhile, Marlowe has a transcendental experience through Kelley that leads him to deal with his past. Later, Topcliffe deciphers a code about former Catholic queen "Bloody Mary" that puts Will into a life-and-death situation. He is forced to warn Father Southwell of the executioners' men coming for him. Opening quote: "To advance thy name, And honorable family..." – Titus Andronicus
6	"Something Wicked This Way Comes"	Magnus Martens	Corinne Marrinan	August 7, 2017	0.364
Will and Alice try to keep it professional by collaborating on a prequel to Henry VI, but their lust returns. However, after Alice calls off her marriage to the rich Keenan Cooper, Will must put an end to the affair. Meanwhile, Anne tries to adjust to London life, but it's not so easy. Later, Marlowe confronts the death of his lover. Presto is put to work in the brothel and faces Topcliffe and tragedy. Opening quote: "Something wicked this way comes..." – Macbeth
7	"What Dreams May Come"	Magnus Martens	Sarah Byrd	August 14, 2017	0.305
After the theatre nearly burns down, Will must help fix it, along with Burbage's debt. Will enlists the help of socialite Emilia Bassano, who introduces him to the wealthy Lord Fortescue. He hires the troupe to perform Will's new play Midsummer Night's Dream for his love. Later, Alice, distraught over Will's rejection, seeks purpose from Father Southwell. Also, Marlowe "sells his soul" by seeking out the Devil during Kelley's ritual, which inspires him to write Doctor Faustus. Opening quote: "Dream on, dream on, of bloody deeds and death..." – Richard III
8	"Your Houses"	Jonathan Teplitzky	Mark Steilen	August 21, 2017	0.291
After another Catholic becomes a martyr, Will writes about Topcliffe's life by disguising the torturer's evil actions in a play: Richard III. Meanwhile, Marlowe's mind-trip to Hell not only diminishes his ability to write, but also leads him down a self-destructive path. As Will discovers Alice's passion to follow Southwell's cause, he must repay his debt to Marlowe by introducing him to the man himself. Later, the plague continues to wreak havoc in London, causing Richard's best friend and fellow player, Autolycus, to fall ill. Opening quote: "A plague on both your houses." – Romeo and Juliet
9	"Play the Devil"	Jonathan Teplitzky	David Rambo	August 28, 2017	0.315
Richard returns from the plague house unharmed, but without Autolycus, and he refuses the role. In order to get Richard to play the king, Will must finish Richard III and make the monstrous Topcliffe more human to the audience, so he confronts the torturer about his childhood. Meanwhile, Marlowe looks for faith with help from Southwell. Later, Alice gets more embroiled in Southwell's plan for religious peace and she is baptized. When the ceremony is interrupted by the queen's men, she puts herself in the dangerous hands of Topcliffe. Opening quote: "And thus I clothe my naked villainy, and seem a saint when most I play the Devil..." – Richard III
10	"Once, Bright Angel"	Shekhar Kapur	Craig Pearce	September 4, 2017	0.307
Will rescues Alice with help from Justice Young, but it comes at a cost. Will's secret is out to the Burbages, but he convinces them to continue with the play and gets Topcliffe to the theater. Marlowe finishes Doctor Faustus and makes peace with his lover Tommy. Richard III is a success and the main character's being modeled after Topcliffe causes him public shame. He is stripped of his power by Walsingham, the queen's secretary, who was in the audience and saw the reaction. Alice journeys on a separate path from Will by setting sail with Southwell. Opening quote: "How all occasions do inform against me, and spur my dull revenge." – Hamlet

== Reception ==
The series has received mixed-to-positive reviews from critics. On the review aggregation website Rotten Tomatoes, the series has a rating of 56%, based on 32 reviews, with an average rating of 6.20/10. Metacritic, which assigns a rating out of 100 to reviews from mainstream critics, reported that there were "generally favorable reviews" for the series, with an average score of 62 based on 27 reviews.

== See also ==
- Will Shakespeare (TV series), a 1978 drama series
- Upstart Crow, Shakespeare-inspired sitcom
