= Chhatrapati Sambhaji (2024 film) =

- Theatrical release poster
- Directed by: Rakesh Subesingh Dulgaj
- Screenplay by: Suresh Chikale
- Story by: Suresh Chikale
- Produced by: Rakesh Subesingh Dulgaj; Rupesh Subesingh Dulgaj
- Starring: Shashank Udapurkar; Pramod Pawar; Rajit Kapur; Mrinal Kulkarni
- Cinematography: Suresh Deshmane
- Edited by: Bharatbhai
- Music by: Avinash Vishwajeet; Guru Sharma; Aarav
- Production companies: Perfect Plus Entertainment; FIF Production; AJ Media Corp.
- Distributed by: UFO Moviez
- Release date: 2 February 2024
- Running time: 136 minutes
- Country: India
- Language: Marathi
- Budget: ₹10–12 crore
- Box office: ₹5.45 crore

Chhatrapati Sambhaji is an Indian Marathi-language historical drama film traces the real life story of Sambhaji, the second chatrapati of the Maratha Empire. The film is directed by Rakesh Subesingh Dulgaj starring Shashank Udapurkar in the title role, and Pramod Pawar, Rajit Kapur, Mrinal Kulkarni in the other principal roles.

The film originally titled "Sambhaji 1689" and was announced back in 2014. It took over nine years to make the film, and it was facing challenges in releasing the theatres. The film was theatrically released on 2 February 2024 in five languages.

== Plot ==
The film is based on the real life of Chhatrapati Sambhaji Maharaj, the son of Chhatrapati Shivaji Maharaj. Because his mother died when he was still a little child, Sambhaji never experienced motherly love. Shivaji shielded him from him, keeping him safe. For this reason, as Sambhaji grew older, he became hostile. However, he showed great bravery. Over the course of his nine years in power, he triumphed in every conflict. This was his final conflict with Aurangzeb, the Mughal emperor.

== Cast ==
- Shashank Udapurkar as Sambhaji
- Pramod Pawar as Shivaji
- Rajit Kapur as Aurangzeb
- Mrunal Kulkarni as Soyarabai
- Mohan Joshi as Annaji
- Bharat Dabholkar as Hambirrao Mohite
- Lokesh Gupte as Kavi Kalash
- Dalip Tahil as Muqarrab Khan
- Bal Dhuri as Balaji Pant
- Deepak Shirke as Diler Khan
- Amit Deshmukh as Iklas Khan
- Anand Abhyankar as Moropant
- Mohini Potdar as Yesubai
- Priya Gamare as Housa
- Sameer as Ganoji Shirke

== Release ==
The film was theatrically released on 2 February 2024 in Marathi, Hindi, Tamil, Telugu and English languages. The film was earlier scheduled to release on 17 January 2014, postponed to 25 July 2014. In 2024, makers announced that the film would be released on 26 January 2024, but the Central Board of Film Certification had asked the makers of the film to provide evidence against Aurangzeb. After completing all the processes of submission of proofs and approval of the board, the film received the UA certificate and was released the next month.

== Reception ==
=== Critical response ===
Source	Review Breakdown	Rating	Ref.
The Times of India	—N/a	2/5 stars	
Film Information	Direction	Ordinary	
Film Information	Cinematography	Good	
Film Information	Acting	Good	
Film Information	Choreography	Average	

Anub George of The Times of India rated 2.0 out of 5 stars and wrote "the hope was that this film would surface some of the less known facts and events from his life. But it doesn't. Poor execution and technical slip-ups ruin a story for the ages."

== Soundtrack ==
Avinash Vishwajit, Guru Sharma and Aarav have composed the music for the film, while Amar-Amit Desai has scored the background score.
