= Prawaas =

Indian Marathi language film

- Theatrical release poster
- Original title: प्रवास
- Directed by: Shashank Udapurkar
- Story by: Shashank Udapurkar
- Produced by: Om Chhangani
- Starring: Ashok Saraf; Padmini Kolhapure; Shashank Udapurkar; Vikram Gokhale; Rajit Kapur; Shreyas Talpade
- Cinematography: Suresh Deshmane
- Edited by: Sanjay Sankla
- Music by: Songs: Salim–Sulaiman; Score: Amar Mohile
- Production company: Om Chhangani Films
- Distributed by: AA Films
- Release date: 14 February 2020
- Running time: 133 minutes
- Country: India
- Language: Marathi

Prawaas (Marathi: प्रवास) is a 2020 Marathi-language drama film directed by Shashank Udapurkar, produced under banner of Om Chhangani Films. The film stars Ashok Saraf, Padmini Kolhapure, Shashank Udapurkar, Vikram Gokhale and Rajit Kapur.

The first scene was filmed on 15 October 2018, and the principal photography began on 19 October in Mumbai. Filming ended on 16 April 2019 and it was released on 14 February 2020.

== Plot ==
Prawaas follows Abhijat Inamdar and Lata Inamdar, an elderly couple. Aware that his remaining time is limited, Abhijat begins helping people with their problems. The work gives him confidence along with a sense of satisfaction and identity.

== Cast ==
- Ashok Saraf as Abhijat Inamdar
  - Ankush Ubhad - young Abhijat Inamdar
- Padmini Kolhapure as Lata Inamdar
- Shashank Udapurkar as Dilip Inamdar
- Vikram Gokhale as Dr. Nene
- Rajit Kapur as Pandit Ramakant Joshi
- Shreyas Talpade as himself
- Supriya Karnik as Lata's friend

== Release ==
The film was released on 14 February 2020. It was screened at 51st International Film Festival of India in January 2021 and will also be screened at 52nd International Film Festival of India in 'Indian Panorama' section, feature film category.

== Soundtrack ==
Prawaas

Soundtrack album by Salim–Sulaiman
- Released: 9 January 2020
- Recorded: 2019
- Studio: Blue Productions
- Genre: Feature film soundtrack
- Length: 14:26
- Language: Marathi
- Label: Zee Music Company

Salim–Sulaiman chronology
Setters (2019)	Prawaas (2020)
External audio
- Audio Jukebox on YouTube

The music was composed by Salim–Sulaiman with lyrics written by Guru Thakur. The songs are sung by Sonu Nigam, Hariharan, Sukhwinder Singh and Shreya Ghoshal.

Amar Mohile composed the background music. The first song in the film, "Prawaas (Reprise)", sung by Shreya, was released on 14 January 2020. The second song, "Prawaas Title Song", sung by Sonu Nigam, was released on 20 January 2020. The music album was released on 9 January 2020 by Zee Music Company Music.

Track listing
No.	Title	Lyrics	Music	Singer(s)	Length
1.	"Prawaas"	Guru Thakur	Salim–Sulaiman	Sonu Nigam	3:36
2.	"Kaun Hain Hum"	Guru Thakur	Salim–Sulaiman	Hariharan	3:55
3.	"Swatacha Saarthi"	Guru Thakur	Salim–Sulaiman	Sukhwinder Singh	3:40
4.	"Prawaas (Reprise)"	Guru Thakur	Salim–Sulaiman	Shreya Ghoshal	3:14
Total length:					14:26
