= Tidelands (TV series) =

Australian supernatural drama television series

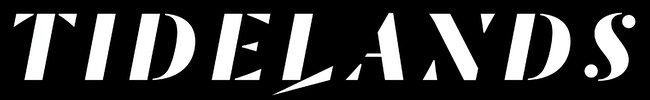
- Created by: Stephen M. Irwin; Leigh McGrath; Nathan Mayfield; Tracey Robertson
- Written by: Stephen M. Irwin; Leigh McGrath
- Screenplay by: Stephen M. Irwin; Leigh McGrath
- Starring: Charlotte Best; Aaron Jakubenko; Marco Pigossi; Richard Davies; Mattias Inwood; Elsa Pataky
- Composer: Matteo Zingales
- Country of origin: Australia
- Original language: English
- No. of seasons: 1
- No. of episodes: 8

Production
- Executive producers: Tracey Robertson; Nathan Mayfield; Leigh McGrath
- Producer: Hoodlum Entertainment
- Running time: 36–47 min

Original release
- Network: Netflix
- Release: 14 December 2018

Tidelands is an Australian supernatural drama television series. The eight-part series is written and created by Stephen M. Irwin and Leigh McGrath, and is produced by Hoodlum Entertainment. It was released on 14 December 2018 on Netflix. Series 1 left some issues unresolved, but as of 2025, no plans have emerged to film a second series.

== Overview ==
Tidelands follows the story of Cal McTeer, who served ten years in prison for an alleged murder while a teenager. She returns home to the small fishing village of Orphelin Bay. She encounters a group of dangerous siren–human hybrids called "Tidelanders", the result of occasional sexual relations between sirens and marine fishermen, while exploring the mysterious appearance of a fisherman's corpse. Filming for the series began in Brisbane and continued through southeastern Queensland.

The plotlines pit the Tidelanders, who largely occupy a communal settlement ruled by a matriarch, Adrielle Cuthbert, with the Orphelin Bay townspeople, many of whom are well aware of the Tidelanders' origins and power over centuries, and of the existence of the secretive and rarely-glimpsed sirens. The townsfolk are paid off or choose to keep their knowledge to themselves, since the Tidelanders are dangerous, and the local fishing cooperative benefits from a lucrative drug trade, recuperating and selling drugs imported and hidden offshore by the Tidelanders' dealers. Relationships between sirens and men, Tidelanders and humans, and some of the other central characters complicate the story of Adrielle's search for fragments of an ancient magical horn made by sirens which, if sounded, would bring destruction on the human world. Cal McTeer's arrival back in Orphelin Bay upsets power dynamics, and she emerges as a powerful challenger to Adrielle, after Cal's origins and identity are questioned and she realises she too has siren powers, including breathing underwater, longevity, seduction, and manipulating fluids.

== Locations ==
Much of the filming took place in and around Moreton Bay, close to Brisbane in South East Queensland, Australia. Aerial shots of the fictional Orphelin Bay were filmed further north in Dunwich, North Stradbroke Island. Cal and Augie's house is at 153 Palm Ave in Shorncliffe a coastal suburb of Brisbane, Devil's Tail bar is the Old Courthouse Restaurant at Raby Bay, and the Orphelin Bay Fishing Cooperative facilities are in Steiglitz.

== Cast ==
=== Main ===
- Charlotte Best as Calliope 'Cal' McTeer
- Aaron Jakubenko as Augie McTeer
- Marco Pigossi as Dylan Seager
- Richard Davies as Colton Raxter
- Dalip Sondhi as Lamar Cloutier
- Mattias Inwood as Corey Welch
- Jacek Koman as Gregori Stolin
- Elsa Pataky as Adrielle Cuthbert

=== Recurring ===
- Alex Dimitriades as Sgt. Paul Murdoch
- Peter O'Brien as Bill Sentelle
- Madeleine Madden as Violca Roux
- Jet Tranter as Leandra
- Caroline Brazier as Rosa
- Hunter Page-Lochard as Jared
- Annabelle Stephenson as Laura Maney
- Cate Feldmann as Genoveva
- Finn Little as Gilles
- Chloe De Los Santos as Bijou
- Alex Andreas as Lev Nuyland
- Dustin Clare as Pat McTeer

== Episodes ==
No.	Title	Directed by	Written by	Original release date
1	"Home"	Toa Fraser	Stephen M. Irwin	14 December 2018
2	"Orphans of L'Attente"	Toa Fraser	Stephen M. Irwin	14 December 2018
3	"Not One of You"	Emma Freeman	Stephen M. Irwin	14 December 2018
4	"Don't Trust Humans"	Emma Freeman	Stephen M. Irwin	14 December 2018
5	"The Calling"	Catriona McKenzie	Stephen M. Irwin	14 December 2018
6	"Loyalty"	Catriona McKenzie	Stephen M. Irwin	14 December 2018
7	"The Prophecy"	Daniel Nettheim	Stephen M. Irwin	14 December 2018
8	"The Queen's Knife"	Daniel Nettheim	Stephen M. Irwin	14 December 2018
