= Shashank Udapurkar =

Indian film director

- Born: 13 August 1975 (age 50); Achalpur, Amravati, Maharashtra, India
- Occupations: Film director; actor; scriptwriter

Shashank Udapurkar is an Indian filmmaker, writer and actor from Achalpur, Maharashtra.

== Filmography ==
Year	Film	Language	Director	Writer	Actor	Notes	Ref.
2009	Kartavya	Marathi	No	No	Yes		
2011	Dhava Dhav	Marathi	No	Yes	Yes		
2014	Badlapur Boys	Hindi	No	No	Yes		
2016	Anna	Hindi	Yes	Yes	Yes		
2020	Prawaas	Marathi	Yes	Yes	Yes		
2024	Chhatrapati Sambhaji	Marathi	No	No	Yes	Released in five languages	
2026	Gabru	Hindi	Yes	Yes	No		
