= Anna (2016 film) =

ANNA
- Promotional Poster
- Directed by: Shashank Udapurkar
- Written by: Shashank Udapurkar
- Produced by: Manindra Jain; Shobhit Kumar; Shekhar Kumar; Uddipt Jain; Aniruddha Gaikar
- Starring: Shashank Udapurkar; Tanishaa; Ankit Sharma; Govind Namdeo; Rajit Kapur; Sharat Saxena; Kishor Kadam
- Cinematography: Suresh Deshmane
- Edited by: Sanjay Sankla
- Music by: Ravindra Jain
- Distributed by: SPE Films India
- Release date: 14 October 2016
- Running time: 130 minutes
- Country: India
- Language: Hindi

Anna: Kisan Baburao Hazare is an Indian biographical film, directed and written by Shashank Udapurkar. It is based on the life of Indian social activist Anna Hazare. Shashank Udapurkar, director of the film, himself would be playing the titular character. The film also stars Tanishaa, Govind Namdev, Sharat Saxena, Kishor Kadam, Daya Shankar Pandey, and Ankit (Sourabh) Sharma in supporting roles. The film was released on 14 October 2016.

== Plot ==
It's about Anna Hazare's life.

== Cast ==
- Shashank Udapurkar as Kisan Baburao Hazare
- Tanishaa as Shikha, journalist
- Ankit Sharma as cameraman
- Govind Namdev as village Sahukar
- Narendra Jain
- Kishor Kadam as Appa
- Daya Shankar Pandey as Ramya
- Jayant Gadekar as Dinkar Rao
- Sharat Saxena as Col Sharat Saxena
- Rajit Kapoor as Rajat Sharma, news editor
- Arif Zakaria as school master
- Atul Shrivastava as Dixit
- Anant Jog as Prakash Mane
- Prasanna Ketkar
- Ashwini Giri
- Girish Pardeshi
- Vikas Shrivastava
- Bhagwan Tiwari
- Shashi Chaturvedi
- Aagaz Virk
- Ajay Tapkire
- Atharva Padhye
- Saurabh Sharma
- Nutan
- Mazhar Khan
- Baldev Trehan
- Princy Lakra
- Tukaram Bidkar
- Gopal Singh Kochar
- Nana Deshmukh
- Durgesh Korade
- Chaitanya Deshmukh
- Chandrakant Karale

== Reception ==
Anshu Lal of Firstpost wrote "An oversimplified, melodramatic biopic fails to do justice to Hazare's life".

== Production ==
=== Development ===
Movie director Shashank Udapurkar, addressed the media that he has received a formal consent from Anna Hazare for making a biopic on the anti-corruption activist, in April 2014.

"It took me long to complete the script on Anna. I had drafted seven scripts before finalising it, since it is a mammoth task to present 75 years of his life in a two and half hour film "

— Shashank Udapurkar, Director.

=== Promotion ===
Anna Hazare himself promoted his biopic on The Kapil Sharma Show.
