= Spirit of the Game =

- Directed by: J.D.Scott
- Written by: J.D.Scott
- Produced by: Steve Jaggi; Spencer McLaren; Kate Whitebread
- Starring: Aaron Jakubenko; Kevin Sorbo; Wade Briggs; Grant Piro; Anna McGahan
- Cinematography: Brian J. Breheny
- Edited by: Adrian Powers
- Music by: Ned McPhie; Matt Rudduck
- Production companies: The Steve Jaggi Company; McLaren House; KW Films
- Distributed by: Samuel Goldwyn Films; Purdie Distribution; Momo Films; Sony Pictures Home Entertainment
- Release date: 7 October 2016
- Running time: 98 minutes
- Country: Australia
- Language: English

Spirit of the Game is a 2016 biographical film written and directed by J.D.Scott with cinematography by Brian J. Breheny (The Adventures of Priscilla, Queen of the Desert). The film is based on the true story of the Mormon Yankees, an American basketball team which played in exhibition games before the 1956 Summer Olympics. The film stars, Aaron Jakubenko, Kevin Sorbo, Wade Briggs, Grant Piro and Anna McGahan.

== Plot ==
It’s 1956 and 20 year old DeLyle Condie travels to Melbourne, Australia, on a mission for the LDS Church in an attempt to recover from a broken heart after his fiancée jilted him. He leaves behind a promising college basketball career and finds himself in a city gripped with Olympic fever. DeLyle struggles to maintain his spirits when faced with the indifference of the locals, but when an opportunity arises to help train Australia’s first Olympic basketball team, DeLyle sees his chance to connect. His passion leads to the formation of the Mormon Yankees basketball team, and in the run up to the Games, fierce competition with the French leads to a bloody rematch, through which DeLyle and his Yankees are able to prove their faith - and their mettle - to the world.

== Cast ==
- Aaron Jakubenko as DeLyle Condie
- Kevin Sorbo as Parley Condie, DeLyle's father
- Wade Briggs as Don Hull
- Grant Piro as Ken Watson, coach of the Australian national basketball team
- Anna McGahan as Elspeth
- Heidi Arena as Mary Condie, DeLyle's mother
- Mark Mitchell as President Bingham, LDS mission president
- Denise Roberts as Sister Bingham
- Alex Cooke as Elder Garn
- Brenton Cosier as Elder Kimball
- Andrew Hearle as Elder Frodsham
- Rudi Baker as Stan Page
- Cameron Caulfield as Brett
- Emilie Cocquerel as Emily, DeLyle's former fiancée
- Hanna MacDonald as herself

== Reception ==
The Deseret News criticised the "stiff acting" in the movie, but highlighted Piro's performance and described the story as "compelling". The Salt Lake Tribune thought the film was full of "ponderous piety" but praised Sorbo for adding some gravitas to his role. The film was nominated for best dramatic cinema in the 2017 Sundance Film Festival.
