= The Last Descent =

2016 biographical survival drama

- Theatrical release poster
- Directed by: Isaac Halasima
- Screenplay by: Isaac Halasima
- Produced by: Bryan Fugal; Mike Staheli; Aaron Stephenson
- Starring: Chadwick Hopson; Alexis Johnson; Landon Henneman; Jyllian Petrie; Jacob Omer
- Cinematography: Isaac Halasima
- Edited by: Isaac Halasima
- Music by: Matthew Cropper; Kalai
- Production companies: Cocollala Pictures; Dark Rider Productions; Deep Blue Films
- Distributed by: Excel Entertainment Group
- Release date: September 16, 2016
- Running time: 105 minutes
- Country: United States
- Language: English

The Last Descent is a 2016 American religious biographical survival drama film co-written, directed, shot, and edited by Isaac Halasima, and is his first feature-length film. It is based on the 2009 failed rescue attempt of John Edward Jones in Nutty Putty Cave, west of Utah Lake. The film was produced by Deep Blue Films, Cocollala Pictures, and Dark Rider Productions and distributed by Excel Entertainment Group. It stars Chadwick Hopson, Alexis Johnson, Landon Henneman, Jyllian Petrie, and Jacob Omer.

== Plot ==
In 2009, John Jones, a 26-year-old medical student and experienced caver, arrives in Utah for the Thanksgiving weekend with his wife Emily and young daughter Lizzie. They are picked up by John's brother Josh, who tells him that the Nutty Putty Cave has been reopened after having been previously closed. Emily approves because of John's enthusiasm so he and Josh go to explore the cave. After Emily leaves with Josh's car, the two brothers enter the cave. John makes a decision to split up and explore an un-mapped route. As he goes deeper into the cave, he gets stuck in a small passageway. As he tries to go back and free himself, he falls into an even smaller hole and passes out.

John wakes up upside down in an 18-inch wide hole and realizes he is completely stuck. He manages to alert Josh, who then tries to pull John out himself but is unsuccessful. Josh, at John's behest, reluctantly leaves him to go get help. While alone, John passes out again due to his upside down position. Hours later, he is woken by Susie, a rescue worker. She tells him many rescuers are on the scene and are doing their best to get him out. Susie then climbs back up to the entrance where she meets with an expert who states that if John is in the tunnel for extended periods of time, his body will begin to shut down. Soon another rescuer, Aaron, is brought to the scene. Aaron has been involved in past rescues that have ended tragically, and he vows to not leave without rescuing John.

Aaron climbs down and finds John, whose condition is starting to deteriorate. He assures John that everything will be all right, and promises him that he'll get out of the cave. John falls asleep and has a vision of his daughter in a field, but with an older man wearing grey clothing, whom he has seen before in hallucinations, after which he wakes up and suffers a panic attack. Aaron manages to calm him down, but not before John injures himself. John begins to talk to Aaron about his relationship with Emily. His conversation is overshadowed with flashbacks from when he first met Emily to them dating. That night, Josh drives Emily to the entrance of the cave where he convinces the lead rescuers into letting her stay at the entrance.

John's condition continues to worsen as the hours go by. Aaron, Susie and other workers plan to pull John out of the hole by drilling pulleys into the walls and hooking the ropes to his feet. Aaron continues to talk to John, occasionally feeding him Gatorade to keep him hydrated. John continues to tell him about his relationship with Emily, and reveals that when he first proposed to her she declined, and his family did not take to it kindly. He still continued to date her, amid rising tensions between her and his family. A radio is lowered into the cave and John is able to speak with Emily, who reveals she is pregnant. Shortly afterwards, he suffers another panic attack. While talking with Aaron again, they each realize that they both served Latter Day Saints missions in Spanish-speaking countries. They both sing "Come Thou Fount of Every Blessing" in Spanish.

The drilling is finished and the attempt to pull John out commences. However, as John is starting to get pulled out, one of the drills comes undone, making dirt explode in all directions, and resulting in John falling back in the hole. The workers rescue an injured Aaron, who struggles to get back to the cave, distraught over another failure and the loss of his new friend. Emily mourns at the entrance, and is able to speak with John one last time. Emily talks with him for a minute before John seemingly dies.

Some time later, John suddenly awakens, and to his surprise, has the strength to push himself out of the hole. He calls for Aaron and Susie and finds the pulley ropes. He notices that the injuries he sustained have disappeared. As he finds his way back to the entrance, he finds it deserted and realizes that he has died and is now a spirit in the afterlife. Saddened, John goes back to the cave.

In the cave, John encounters another spirit in the form of an infant. As he talks to the baby, he realizes the baby is his soon to be born son. He then reflects on the hallucinations and visions of the boy and the man in grey with Emily and Lizzie. He realizes that the man was always his son, and tearfully tells the infant to watch over his mother and sister. As he takes the baby from his cradle and exits the cave, the baby is born at a hospital and is placed in Emily's arms, who happily announces that she has named him after John. Epilogue captions state that the cave's entrance has since been sealed, with John's body still inside, and provides a thank you to the rescuers, from the family. It also mentions that Emily remarried less than three years after the ordeal.

== Cast ==
- Chadwick Hopson as John Jones, a medical student who gets stuck in an 18-inch wide hole in Nutty Putty Cave.
  - Ashton Collins as Young John
  - Brighton Grow as Teen John
  - Beau Smith as Baby John
- Alexis "Lexy" Johnson as Emily Jones, John's wife.
- Landon Henneman as Aaron, a veteran rescue worker who is distraught over past rescues that have ended tragically. He is a composite character of the many workers who conversed with John during the attempted rescue.
- Jyllian Petrie as Susie, one of the rescue workers, also a composite character.
- Jacob Omer as Josh Jones, John's brother.
  - Canyon Canary as Young Josh
  - Dalek Atkinson as Teen Josh
- Mason D. Davis as Man in Dark, a hallucination John has seen over the course of his life. The man is later revealed to be the spirit of his unborn son.
- Paul Tan as Dr. Doug Murdock, a medical expert who provides information warning the rescuers of John's condition in the cave.
- Mark Webb as Sheriff Hodgson, the leader in the rescuing effort.
- Madison Coleman as Lizzie, John's young daughter.
  - Mathias Flake as Younger Lizzie

== Production ==
Filming took place entirely in Utah, with exterior shots of the cave at the actual entrance, and the interior holes and twists recreated in a warehouse in West Valley.

== Release ==
The film had a limited release in Arizona, Utah, and Idaho on September 16, 2016.

== Reception ==
The film had a limited release but received generally positive reviews, with praise for its direction, acting, and cinematography, with some criticism for its tone and pacing.
