= Mattias Inwood =

New Zealand actor

- Born: 1993 or 1994 (age 31–32); Wānaka, New Zealand
- Education: Toi Whakaari
- Occupation: Actor
- Years active: 2016-present

Mattias Inwood (born in Wānaka) is a New Zealand actor, best known for his role in The Shannara Chronicles (2016–2017), for his portrayal of Richard Burbage in Will (2017), and his role on the soap opera Shortland Street (1992–) since 2021. He graduated from Toi Whakaari with a Bachelor's degree in performing arts in 2015.

== Selected credits ==
=== Film ===
Year	Title	Role	Ref.
2019	Guns Akimbo	Skizm Goon #6	
2026	Perfect Wedding Days	Dan	

=== Television ===
Year	Title	Role	Network	Ref.
2016–2017	The Shannara Chronicles	Lorin	MTV	
2017	Will	Richard Burbage	TNT	
2018	Tidelands	Corey Welch	Netflix	
2021	Shortland Street	Dr. Tom Griffiths	TVNZ 2	
