= Ralegan Siddhi =

Village in Maharashtra

- Village
- Location in Maharashtra, India Ralegan Siddhi (India)
- Coordinates: 18.92°N 74.41°E
- Country: India
- State: Maharashtra
- District: Ahmednagar

Government
  - Type: Panchayati raj (India)
  - Body: Gram panchayat

Languages
  - Official: Marathi
- Time zone: UTC+5:30 (IST)
- PIN: 414302
- Telephone code: 02488
- Vehicle registration: MH-16
- Website: maharashtra.gov.in

Ralegan Siddhi is a village in Parner taluka of Ahmednagar District, in the Indian state of Maharashtra. Located 87 km from Pune, the village has an area of 982.31 ha (1991). It is considered a model of environmental conservation. The village has carried out programs like tree planting, terracing to reduce soil erosion and digging canals to retain rainwater. For energy, the village uses solar power, biogas (some generated from the community toilet) and a windmill. The project is heralded as a sustainable model of a village republic.

The village's biggest accomplishment is in its use of renewable sources for energy. For example, each streetlight in the village has a separate solar panel. The village is headed by a Sarpanch who is the chief of the Gram panchayat (village panchayat).

== Demographics ==
In 2001, the village had 394 households with a total population of 2306 (1265 males and 1041 females).

== Watershed development ==
In 1975 the village was afflicted by drought, poverty prevailed, and trade in illicit liquor was widespread. The village tank could not hold water as the embankment dam wall leaked. Work began with the percolation tank construction. Anna Hazare encouraged the villagers to donate their labour to repair the embankment. Once this was fixed, the seven wells below filled with water in the summer for the first time in memory.

Now the village has water year round, as well as a grain bank, a milk bank, and a school. There is no longer any poverty.

== Model village ==
The World Bank Group has concluded that the village of Ralegan Siddhi was transformed from a highly degraded village ecosystem in a semi-arid region of extreme poverty to one of the richest in the country. The Ralegan Siddhi example, now 25 years old, by demonstrating that it is possible to rebuild natural capital in partnership with the local economy, is a model for the rest of the country.

== Anna Hazare ==
Indian social activist Anna Hazare, leader of the village, is accredited in helping in the development of the village. He was awarded the Padma Bhushan—the third-highest civilian award—by the Government of India in 1992 for his efforts in establishing this village as a model for others.
