= Anna Hazare =

Indian activist (born 1937)

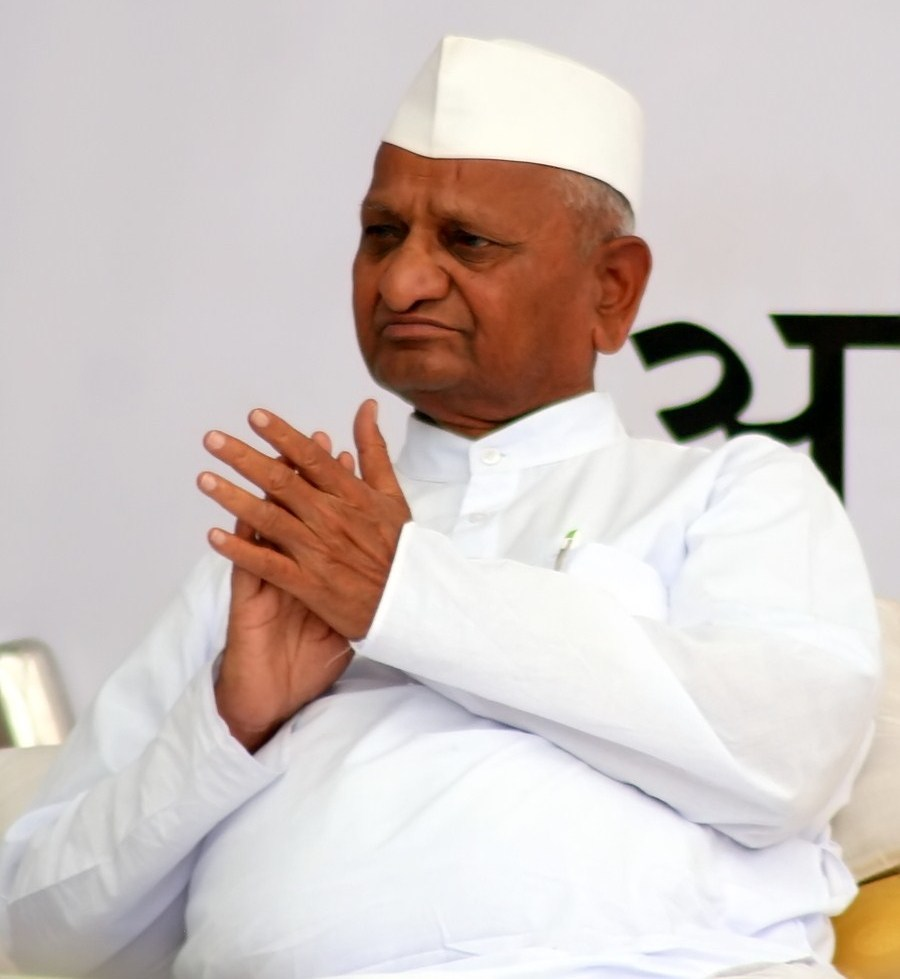
- Hazare in 2011
- Born: Kisan Baburao Hazare; 15 June 1937 (age 89); Bhingar, Bombay Presidency, British India (present-day Maharashtra, India)
- Other name: Kisan Baburao Hazare
- Citizenship: Indian
- Known for: Indian anti-corruption movement – 2012, Indian anti-corruption movement – 2011, Watershed development programmes, Right to Information
- Movement: Indian anti-corruption movement, Peace movement
- Parents: Baburao Hazare (father); Laxmibai Hazare (mother)
- Awards: Padma Shri (1990); Padma Bhushan (1992)
- Military career
- Allegiance: India
- Branch: Indian Army
- Service years: 1960–1975
- Rank: Sepoy
- Conflicts: Indo-Pakistani War of 1965

Kisan Baburao "Anna" Hazare (born 15 June 1937) is an Indian social activist who has led movements to promote rural development, increase government transparency, and investigate and punish corruption in public life. He was awarded the Padma Bhushan—the third-highest civilian award—by the Government of India in 1992.

Hazare started a hunger strike on 5 April 2011 to exert pressure on the Indian government to enact a stringent anti-corruption law, The Lokpal Bill, 2011 as envisaged in the Jan Lokpal Bill, for the institution of an ombudsman with the power to deal with corruption in public places. The fast led to nationwide protests in support. The fast ended on 9 April 2011, a day after the government accepted Hazare's demands. The government issued a gazette notification on the formation of a joint committee, consisting of government and civil society representatives, to draft the legislation.

Foreign Policy named him among top 100 global thinkers in 2011. Also in 2011, Hazare was ranked as the most influential person in Mumbai by a national daily newspaper. He has faced criticism for his authoritarian views on justice, including suggesting death penalty as punishment for corrupt public officials and his alleged support for forced vasectomies as a method of family planning.

== Early life ==
Kisan Baburao Hazare was born on 15 June 1937 (some sources say 15 January 1940) in Bhingar, near Ahmednagar. He was the eldest son of Baburao Hazare and Laxmi Bai. He has two sisters and four brothers. He later adopted the name Anna, which in Marathi means "elder person" or "father".

His father worked as an unskilled labourer in Ayurveda Ashram Pharmacy and struggled to support the family financially. In time, the family moved to their ancestral village of Ralegan Siddhi, where they owned a small amount of agricultural land. A relative took on the burden of providing Kisan with an education, taking him to Mumbai because the village had no primary school. The relative became unable financially to continue the support and Kisan's schooling ended in the Standard Seventh grade; his siblings never attended school. He started selling flowers at the Dadar railway station in Mumbai and eventually managed to own two flower shops in the city. He also became involved in vigilantism, joining groups who acted to prevent landlords' thugs from intimidating the poor out of their shelter.

== Military service ==
Hazare was drafted into the Indian Army in April 1960, where he initially worked as an army truck driver and was later attested as a soldier. He undertook army training at Aurangabad.

During the Indo-Pakistani War of 1965, Hazare was posted at the border in the Khem Karan sector. He was the sole survivor of an enemy attack—variously claimed to have been a bomb, an aerial assault and an exchange of fire at the border—while he was driving a truck. The experiences of wartime, coupled with the poverty from which he had come, affected him. He considered suicide at one point but instead turned to pondering the meaning of life and death. He said of the truck attack, "[It] sent me thinking. I felt that God wanted me to stay alive for some reason. I was reborn in the battlefield of Khem Karan. And I decided to dedicate my new life to serving people." At a book stand in New Delhi railway station, he came across Swami Vivekananda's booklet "Call to the youth for nation building" which inspired him to think deeper. He spent his spare time reading the works of Swami Vivekananda, Gandhi, and Vinoba Bhave. In a blog post, Hazare expressed his views on Kashmir by saying that it was his "active conviction that Kashmir is an integral part of India" and that if required once again for service, he would remain "ready to take part in war against Pakistan."

During his fifteen-year career in the army (1960–75), Anna Hazare was posted at several locations, including Punjab (Indo Pak war 1965), Nagaland, Bombay (1971) and Jammu (1974).

During the Indo-Pakistani war, Hazare survived a road crash while driving for the army. He interpreted his survival as a further sign that his life was intended to be dedicated to service. He had another escape in Nagaland, where one night, underground Naga rebels attacked his post and killed all the inmates. He had a miraculous escape as he had gone out to return nature's call and hence turned out to be the lone survivor.

Official records show that he was honourably discharged in 1975 after completing 12 years of service.

== Transformation of Ralegan Siddhi ==
Hazare returned to Ralegan Siddhi, a village then described by Satpathy and Mehta as "one of the many villages of India plagued by acute poverty, deprivation, a fragile ecosystem, neglect and hopelessness."

Although most of the villagers owned some land, cultivation was extremely difficult due to the rocky ground preventing retention of the monsoon rains, this situation was worsened by gradual environmental deterioration as trees were cut down, erosion spread and droughts were also experienced. The shortage of water also led to disease from unsanitary conditions and water reuse for multiple purposes. The economy of the village had become reliant on the illegal manufacture and sale of alcohol, a product on which many of the villagers had become dependent. Many inhabitants borrowed from moneylenders to survive, paying monthly interest rates of as much as 10%. Crime and violence (including domestic violence) had become commonplace, while education and employment opportunities were poor.

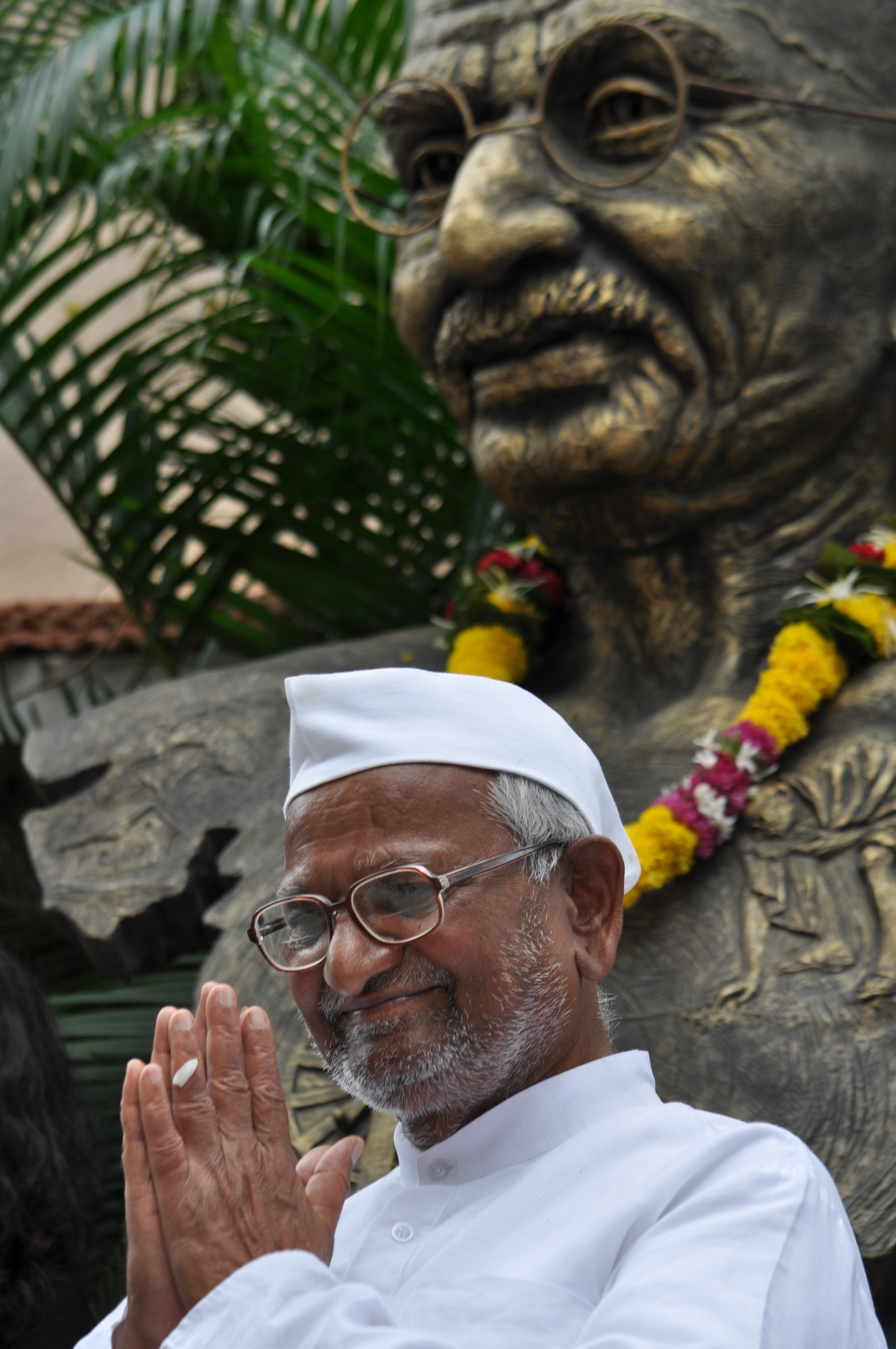
Anna with Mahatma Gandhi statue in Ralegan Siddhi

Hazare was relatively wealthy because of the gratuity from his army service. He set about using that money to restore a run-down, vandalised village temple as a focal point for the community. Some were able to respond with small financial donations but many other villagers, particularly among the elderly, donated their labour in a process that became known as shramdaan. Some youths also became involved in the work and these he organised into a Tarun Mandal (Youth Association). One of the works of Vivekananda which he had read was Call to the youth for nation building.

=== Prohibition of alcohol ===
Hazare and the youth group decided to take up the issue of alcoholism to drive a process of reform. At a meeting conducted in the temple, the villagers resolved to close down liquor dens and ban alcohol in the village. Since these resolutions were made in the temple, they became, in a sense, religious commitments. Over thirty liquor brewing units voluntarily closed their establishments. Those who did not succumb to social pressure were forced to close their businesses when the youth group smashed their premises. The owners could not complain as their businesses were illegal.

Once 3 drunken villagers were tied to pillars and then flogged, personally by Hazare with his army belt. He justified this punishment by stating that "rural India was a harsh society", and that

Doesn't a mother administer bitter medicines to a sick child when she knows that the medicine can cure her child? The child may not like the medicine, but the mother does it only because she cares for the child. The alcoholics were punished so that their families would not be destroyed.

Hazare appealed to the government of Maharashtra to pass a law whereby prohibition would come into force in a village if 25% of the women in the village demanded it. In 2009 the state government amended the Bombay Prohibition Act, 1949 to reflect this.

It was decided to ban the sale of tobacco, cigarettes, and beedies (an unfiltered cigarette where the tobacco is rolled in tendu, also known as Coromandel ebony, leaves instead of paper) in the village. To implement this resolution, the youth group performed a unique "Holi" ceremony twenty two years ago. The festival of Holi is celebrated as a symbolic burning of evil. The youth group brought all the tobacco, cigarettes, and beedies from the shops in the village and burnt them in a Holi fire. Tobacco, cigarettes, or beedies are no longer sold.

=== Grain Bank ===
In 1980, Hazare started the Grain Bank at the temple, with the objective of providing food security to needy farmers during times of drought or crop failure. Rich farmers, or those with surplus grain production, could donate a quintal to the bank. In times of need, farmers could borrow the grain, but they had to return the amount of grain they borrowed, plus an additional quintal as an interest. This ensured that nobody in the village ever went hungry or had to borrow money to buy grain. This also prevented distress sales of grain at lower prices at harvest time.

=== Watershed development programme ===
Ralegan Siddhi is located in the foothills, so Hazare persuaded villagers to construct a watershed embankment and associated works to stop water and allow it to percolate and increase the ground water level and improve irrigation in the area. These efforts solved the problem of water scarcity in the village and made irrigation possible.

Cultivation of water-intensive crops like sugarcane was banned. Crops such as pulses, oilseeds, and certain cash crops with low water requirements replaced them. The farmers started growing high-yield varieties and changed cropping pattern. Hazare has helped farmers of more than 70 villages in drought-prone regions in the state of Maharashtra since 1975. When Hazare came to Ralegan Siddhi in 1975 only 70 acres (28 ha) of land was irrigated, Hazare converted it into about 2,500 acres (1,000 ha).

=== Education ===
In 1932, Ralegan Siddhi got its first formal school, a single classroom primary school. In 1962, the villagers added more classrooms through community volunteer efforts. By 1971, out of an estimated population of 1,209, only 30.43% were literate (72 women and 290 men). Boys moved to the nearby towns of Shirur and Parner to pursue higher education, but girls were limited to primary education. Hazare, along with the youth of Ralegan Siddhi, worked to increase literacy rates and education levels. In 1976 they started a pre-school and a high school in 1979. The villagers formed a charitable trust, the Sant Yadavbaba Shikshan Prasarak Mandal, which was registered in 1979.

=== Removal of untouchability ===
The social barriers and discrimination that existed due to the caste system in India have been largely eliminated by Ralegan Siddhi villagers. It was Hazare's moral leadership that motivated and inspired the villagers to shun untouchability and caste discrimination. Marriages of Dalits are held as part of community marriage program together with those of other castes. The Dalits have become integrated into the social and economic life of the village. The upper caste villagers built houses for the lower caste Dalits by shramdaan and helped to repay their loans.

=== Gram Sabha ===
The Gandhian philosophy on rural development considers the Gram Sabha as an important democratic institution for collective decision-making in the villages of India. Hazare campaigned between 1998 and 2006 for amending the Gram Sabha Act, so that villagers have a say in the village's development. The state government initially refused, but eventually gave in to public pressure. It became mandatory to seek the sanction of the Gram Sabha (an assembly of all village adults, and not just the few elected representatives in the gram panchayat) for expenditures on development works in the village.

== Activism ==
=== Anti-corruption protests in Maharashtra ===
Anna Hazare's supporter's cap which reads "I am Anna Hazare"

In 1991 Hazare launched the Bhrashtachar Virodhi Jan Andolan (BVJA, People's Movement against Corruption), a popular movement to fight against corruption in Ralegaon Siddhi. In the same year he protested against the collusion between 40 forest officials and timber merchants. This protest resulted in the transfer and suspension of these officials.

In May 1997 Hazare protested alleged malpractice in the purchase of powerlooms by the Vasantrao Naik Bhathya Vimukt Jhtra Governor P. C. Alexander. On 4 November 1997 Gholap filed a defamation suit against Hazare for accusing him of corruption. He was arrested in April 1998 and was released on a personal bond of ₹5,000 (US$50). On 9 September 1998 Hazare was imprisoned in the Yerawada Jail to serve a three-month sentence mandated by the Mumbai Metropolitan Court. The sentencing caused leaders of all political parties except the BJP and the Shiv Sena to support him. Later, due to public protests, the Government of Maharashtra ordered his release. Hazare wrote a letter to then chief minister Manohar Joshi demanding Gholap's removal for his role in alleged malpractices in the Awami Merchant Bank. Gholap resigned from the cabinet on 27 April 1999.

In 2003 corruption charges were raised by Hazare against four NCP ministers of the Congress-NCP government. He started his fast unto death on 9 August 2003. He ended his fast on 17 August 2003 after then chief minister Sushil Kumar Shinde formed a one-man commission headed by the retired justice P. B. Sawant to probe his charges. The P. B. Sawant commission report, submitted on 23 February 2005, indicted Sureshdada Jain, Nawab Malik, and Padmasinh Patil. The report exonerated Vijaykumar Gavit. Jain and Malik resigned from the cabinet in March 2005.

Three trusts headed by Anna Hazare were also indicted in the P. B. Sawant commission report. ₹220,000 (US$2,280) spent by the Hind Swaraj Trust for Anna Hazare's birthday celebrations was concluded by the commission as illegal and amounting to a corrupt practice, though Abhay Firodia, an industrialist subsequently donated ₹248,000 (US$2,580) to the trust for that purpose. The setting apart of 11 acres of its land by the trust in favour of the Zilla Parishad without obtaining permission from the charity commissioner was concluded as a case of maladministration. The commission also concluded that the maintenance of accounts of the Bhrashtachar Virodhi Janandolan Trust after 10 November 2001 had not been according to the rules and ₹46,374 (US$480) spent by the Sant Yadavbaba Shikshan Prasarak Mandal Trust for renovating a temple thwarted its object of imparting secular education.

=== Right to Information movement ===
In the early 2000s Hazare led a movement in Maharashtra state which forced the state government to enact a revised Maharashtra Right to Information Act. This Act was later considered as the base document for the Right to Information Act 2005 (RTI), enacted by the Union Government. It also ensured that the President of India assented to this new Act.

On 20 July 2006 the Union Cabinet amended the Right to Information Act 2005 to exclude the file noting by the government officials from its purview. Hazare began his fast unto death on 9 August 2006 in Alandi against the proposed amendment. He ended his fast on 19 August 2006, after the government agreed to change its earlier decision.

=== Regulation of Transfers and Prevention of Delay in Discharge of Official Duties Act ===
Before 2006 in the state of Maharashtra, honest government officers were transferred to other places according to ministerial wish, while some corrupt and favoured officials stayed put for decades. Hazare fought for a law whereby a government servant must clear files within a specified time, and transfers must take place only after three years. After many years of Hazare's efforts, on 25 May 2006 Maharashtra announced the Prevention of Delay in Discharge of Official Duties Act 2006. This act provided for disciplinary action against officials who clear files slowly, and enabled monitoring of officials who overstay a post, and for involvement in a corrupt nexus.

This act mandated the government to effect transfers of all government officers and employees, except Class IV workers, no sooner and no later than three years, except in emergency or exceptional circumstances. Maharashtra was the first state to introduce such an act. However, this law was not fully followed.

=== Campaign against liquor from food grains ===
Article 47 of India's Constitution commits the State to raise the standard of living, improve public health and prohibit the consumption of intoxicating drinks and drugs injurious to health.

In 2007 Maharashtra rolled out a policy aimed to encourage production of alcohol from food grain to fill the rising demand for industrial alcohol and liquor. It issued 36 licences for distilleries for making alcohol from food grain.

Anna Hazare opposed the government's policy to promote making liquor from food grain. He argued that Maharashtra had to import food, so producing liquor from food grain was inappropriate. One State minister, Laxman Dhoble said that those opposing the use of food grain for the production of liquor were anti-farmer, and that opponents should be beaten with sugarcane sticks.

Hazare began fasting at Shirdi, but on 21 March 2010 the government promised to review the policy and Anna ended his 5-day fast. But the government later granted 36 licences and grants of ₹10 (10¢ US) (per litre of alcohol) to politicians or their sons who were engaged in making alcohol from foodgrains. Recipients included Amit and Dheeraj Deshmukh, sons of Union Heavy Industries Minister Vilasrao Deshmukh, Bharatiya Janata Party leader Gopinath Munde's daughter Pankaja Palwe and her husband Charudatta Palwe, sons-in-law of P.V. Narasimha Rao and Rajya Sabha MP Govindrao Adik. The government approved the licences despite stiff opposition from the planning and finance departments, saying there was a huge demand in other countries for distilled spirits compared to that of molasses. Hazare sued Maharashtra over the policy in the Nagpur bench of the Bombay High Court. On 20 August 2009 Maharashtra stopped the policy. However, distilleries sanctioned before that date and those who started production within two years of sanction were entitled for subsidies.

On 5 May 2011 the court refused to hear the suit, saying, "not before me, this is a court of law, not a court of justice". A Maharashtra Principal Secretary, C.S. Sangeet Rao, stated that no law existed to scrap these licences.

=== Lokpal Bill movement ===
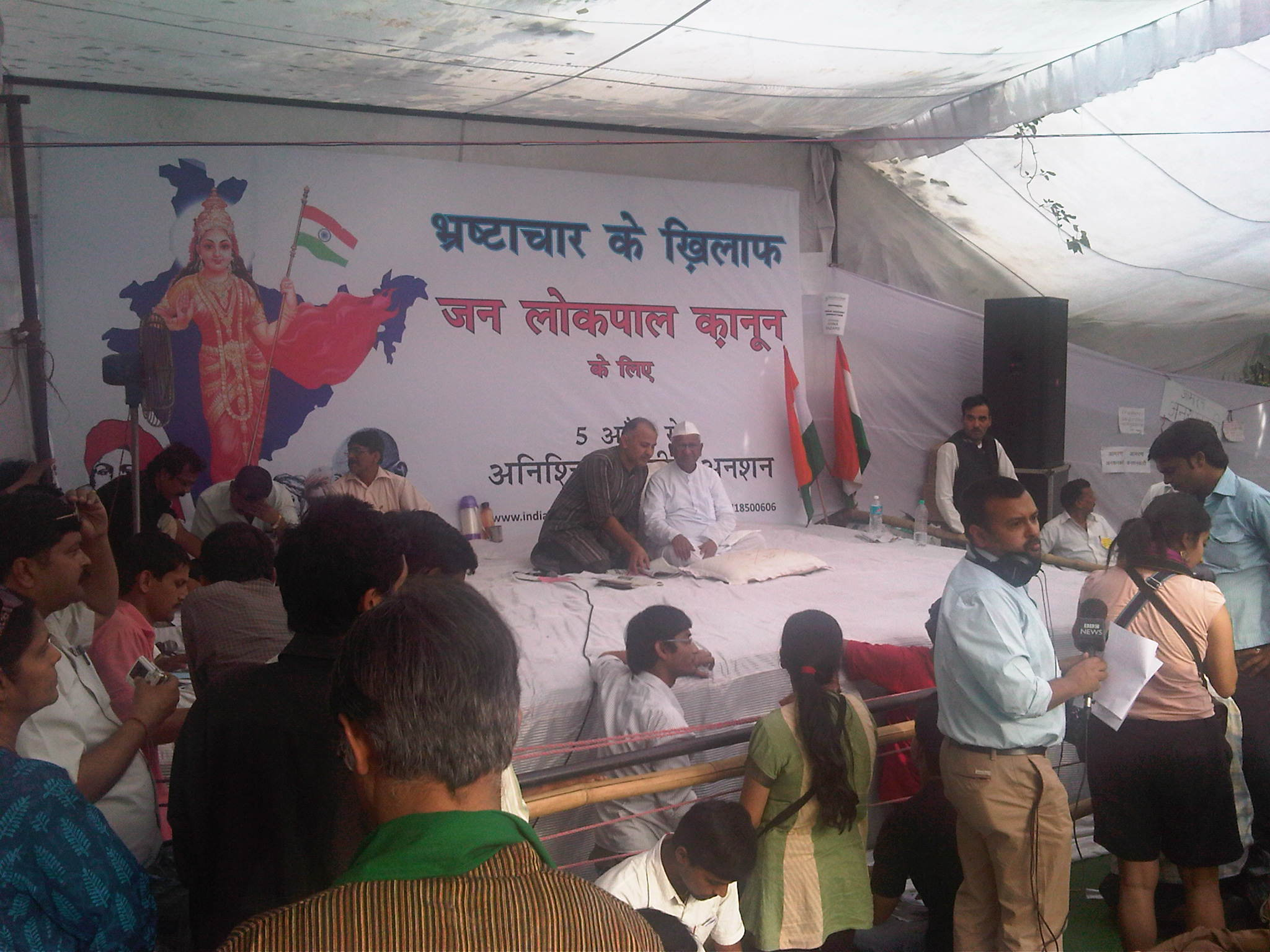
Anna Hazare's hunger strike at Jantar Mantar in New Delhi.

In 2011, Hazare participated in the satyagraha movement campaigning for a stronger anti-corruption Lokpal (ombudsman) bill in the Indian parliament. Known as the Jan Lokpal Bill (People's Ombudsman Bill), it was drafted by N. Santosh Hegde, a former justice of the Supreme Court of India and Lokayukta of Karnataka, Prashant Bhushan, and social activist Arvind Kejriwal. The draft incorporated more stringent provisions and gave wider power to the Lokpal than the government's 2010 draft. These included placing "the Prime Minister within the ambit of the proposed lokpal's powers".

==== Hunger strike ====
Hazare began an "indefinite fast" on 5 April 2011 at Jantar Mantar in Delhi as part of the campaign to form a joint committee of government and civil society representatives. He wanted this committee to draft a bill with more stringent penal provisions and gave more independence to the Lokpal and Lokayuktas (ombudsmen in the states). The fast came after his demand was rejected by the prime minister, Manmohan Singh. Hazare said, "I will fast until Jan Lokpal Bill is passed".

The movement attracted attention in the media and thousands of supporters. Almost 150 people reportedly joined Hazare in his fast. Social activists, including Medha Patkar, Arvind Kejriwal, former IPS officer Kiran Bedi, and Jayaprakash Narayan lent their support. People showed support in social media. In addition to spiritual leaders Sri Sri Ravi Shankar, Swami Ramdev, Swami Agnivesh, the former Indian cricketer Kapil Dev and many other celebrities supported him. Hazare decided that he would not allow any politician to sit with him. The protesters rejected Uma Bharti, Om Prakash Chautala and others when they visited the protest. On 6 April 2011 Sharad Pawar resigned from the group of ministers formed for reviewing the 2010 draft.

Protests spread to Bangalore, Mumbai, Chennai, Ahmedabad, Guwahati, Shillong, Aizawl and other cities.

On 8 April 2011 the Government accepted the movement's demands. On 9 April it issued a notification in the Gazette of India on formation of a joint committee. It accepted the formula that it should be co-chaired by a politician and social activist. The notification stated, "The Joint Drafting Committee shall consist of five nominee ministers of the Government of India and five nominees of the civil society. The five nominee Ministers of the Government of India are Pranab Mukherjee, Union Minister of Finance, P. Chidambaram, Union Minister of Home Affairs, M. Veerappa Moily, Union Minister of Law and Justice, Kapil Sibal, Union Minister of Human Resource and Development and Minister of Communication and Information Technology and Salman Khursheed, Union Minister of Water Resources and Minister of Minority Affairs. The five non-politician nominees were Anna Hazare, N. Santosh Hegde, Shanti Bhushan Senior Advocate, Prashant Bhushan, Advocate and Arvind Kejriwal.

On the morning of 9 April 2011 Hazare ended his 98-hour hunger strike. He addressed the people and set a deadline of 15 August 2011 to pass the bill. He said that

Real fight begins now. We have a lot of struggle ahead of us in drafting the new legislation. We have shown the world in just five days that we are united for the cause of the nation. The youth power in this movement is a sign of hope.

Hazare said that if the bill did not pass he would call for a mass nation-wide agitation. He called his movement a "second struggle for independence" and he will continue the fight.

Hazare threatened on 28 July 2012 to proceed with his fast-unto-death on the Jan Lokpal Bill issue. He also stated that country's future is not safe in the hands of Congress and BJP and he would campaign in the coming elections for those with clean background. On the third day of his indefinite fast, Anna stated that he will not talk even to the Prime Minister till his demands are met. On 2 August 2012 Hazare said that there was nothing wrong with forming a new political party but, he would neither join the party nor contest elections. Team and Anna have decided to end their indefinite fast on 3 August 2012 at 5 pm after which the team will announce their decision to enter politics.

==== Draft bill ====
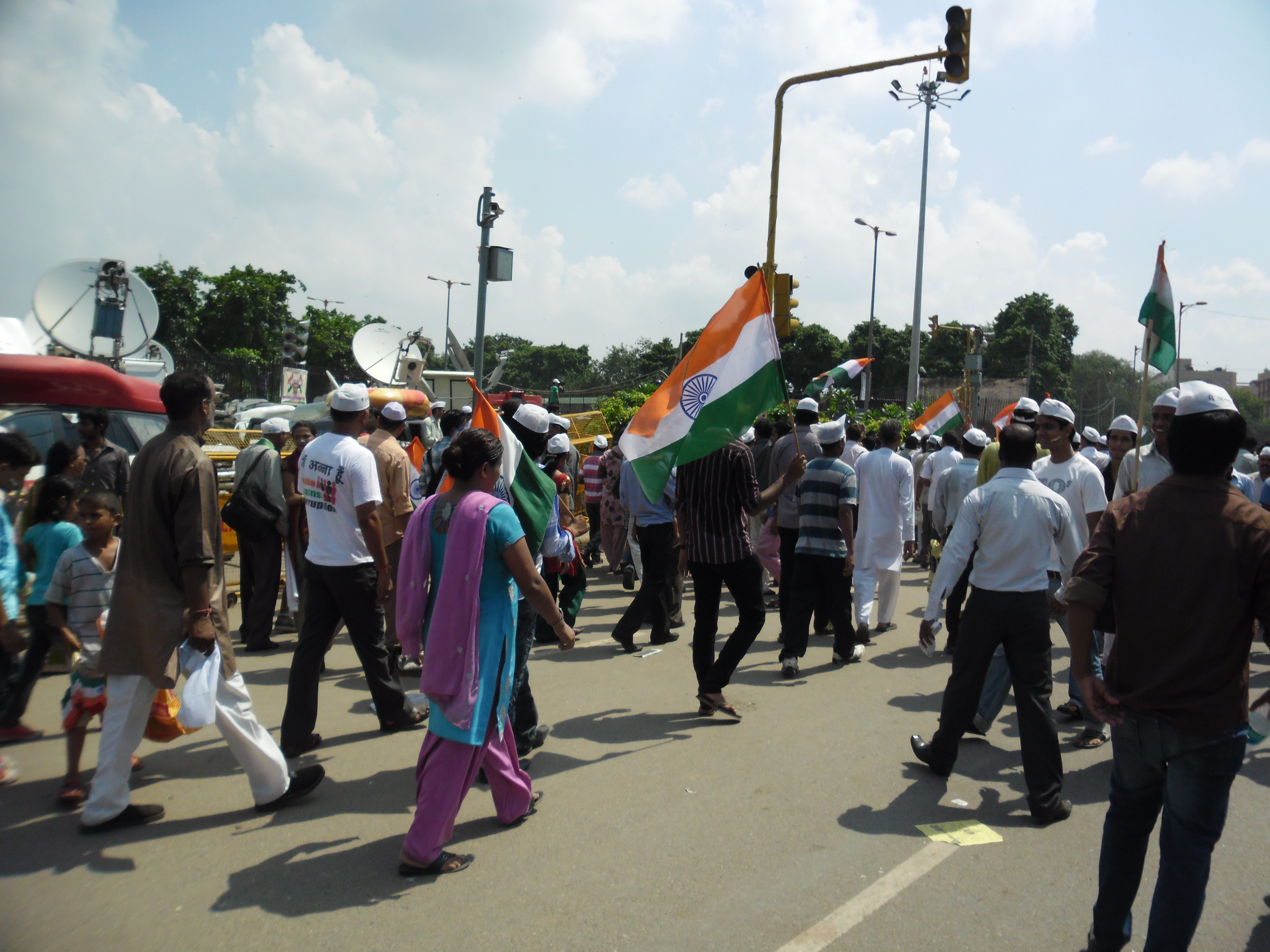
People on road in support of Anna Hazare near Ramlila maidan.

During the meeting of the joint drafting committee on 30 May 2011, the Union government members opposed the inclusion of the prime minister, higher judiciary and the acts of the MPs under the purview of the JanLokpal in the draft bill. On 31 May, Mukherjee sent a letter to the chief ministers of all states and party leaders seeking their opinion on six contentious issues, including whether to bring the prime minister and judges of India's Supreme Court and High Courts under the law's purview. But the civil society members of the drafting committee considered that keeping them out would be a violation of the United Nations Convention against Corruption.

Hazare and other civil society members decided to boycott the 6 June 2011 drafting committee meeting to protest the forcible eviction of Swami Ramdev and his followers by the Delhi Police from Ramlila Maidan on 5 June 2011, while they were on a hunger strike against black money and corruption.

On 6 June 2011, the civil society members wrote to Mukherjee, explaining reasons for their absence and also asking government to go public on the major issues. They also decided to attend only future meetings that were telecast live. On 8 June at Rajghat, describing his movement as the second freedom struggle, Hazare criticised the Government for trying to discredit the drafting committee and threatened to go on indefinite fast again starting 16 August 2011 if the Lokpal Bill had not passed. He also criticised the Government for putting hurdles in front of the Bill and for maligning the civil society members.

==== Indefinite fast ====
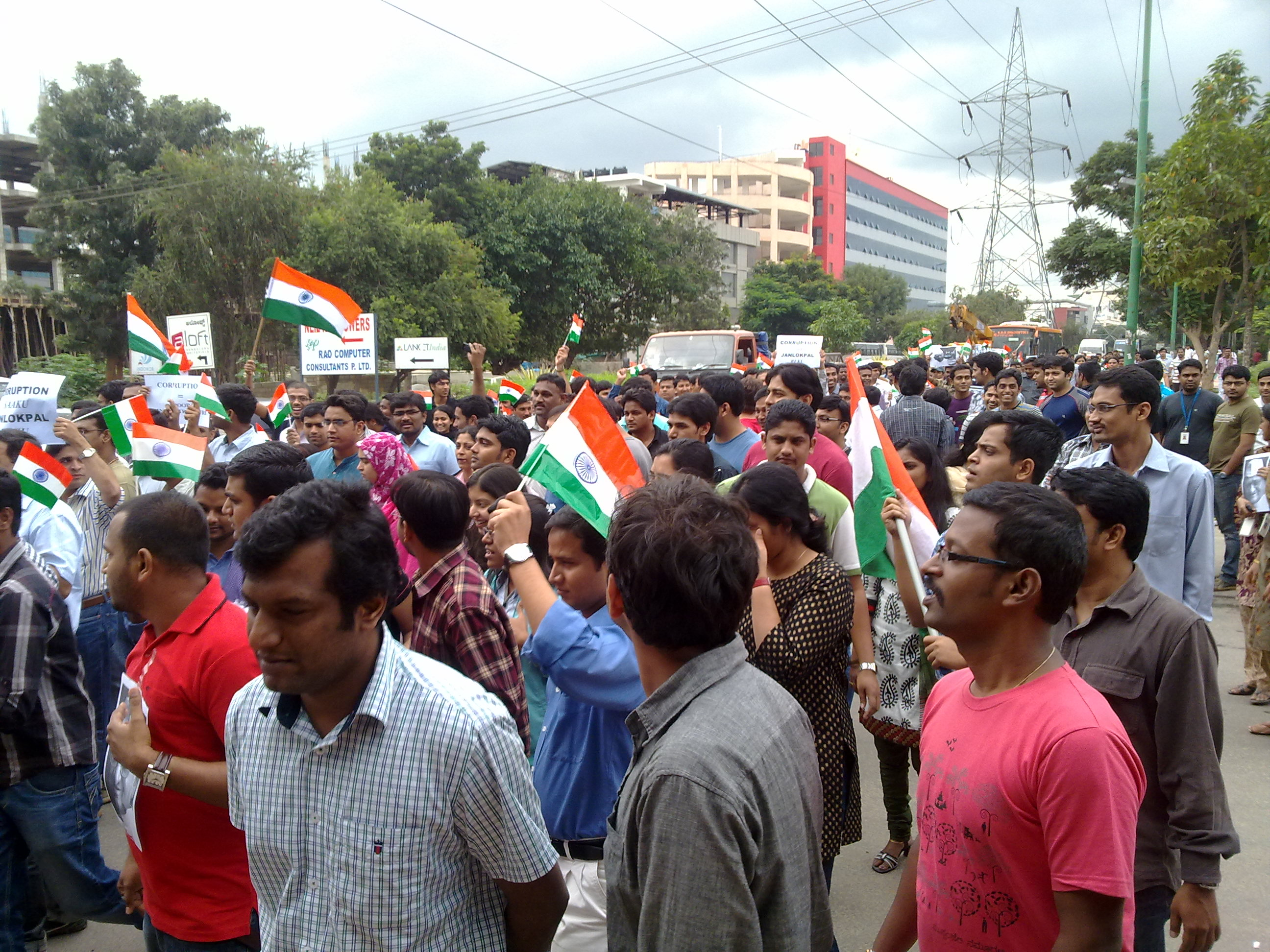
India Against Corruption campaign in Whitefield, Bangalore.

On 28 July 2011 the union cabinet approved a draft of the Lokpal Bill, which kept the Prime Minister, judiciary and lower bureaucracy out of the ombudsman's scope. Hazare rejected the government version by describing it as "cruel joke". He wrote a letter to Singh announcing his decision to begin an indefinite fast from 16 August 2011 at Jantar Mantar, if the government introduced its own version of the bill without taking suggestions from civil society members. Hazare wrote:

Why are you (government) sending the wrong draft? We have faith in Parliament. But first send the right draft, our agitation is against government, not Parliament. The government has overlooked many points. How will it fight corruption by excluding government employees, CBI and prime minister from the Lokpal's purview? We were told that both the drafts would be sent to the Cabinet. But only the government's draft was sent. This is a deceitful government. They are lying. How will they run the country? Now I have no trust in this government. If it is really serious about fighting corruption, why is it not bringing government employees and CBI under Lokpal?

Within twenty four hours of cabinet's endorsement of a weak Lokpal Bill, over ten thousand people from across the country sent faxes directly to the government demanding a stronger bill. The Mumbai Taxi Men's Union, comprising over 30,000 taxi drivers supported Hazare's fast by keeping all taxis off the roads on 16 August. Lawyers of Allahabad High Court described the government proposal as against the national interest and pledged their support to Hazare by hunger striking at Allahabad on 16 August. On 30 July Vishwa Hindu Parishad supported his fast by saying movement for an effective anti-corruption ombudsman needed the people's backing.

On 1 August 2011, Public interest litigation was filed in the Supreme Court of India by Hemant Patil, a Maharashtra-based social worker and businessman, to restrain Hazare, alleging that Hazare's demands were unconstitutional and amounted to interference in the legislative process.

==== Arrest and aftermath ====
On 16 August 2011, Hazare was arrested, four hours before the planned indefinite hunger strike. Rajan Bhagat, spokesman for Delhi Police, said police arrested Hazare for illegally gathering in a Delhi park to begin his hunger strike, claiming that Hazare refused to meet police conditions for allowing the protest. The conditions included restricting the fast to three days and the number of protesters to 5,000. Later in the afternoon, Hazare refused bail. The magistrate dispatched him to Tihar jail for seven days. After announcements by Prashant Bhushan, local television, and social media sites (including Facebook), thousands marched in support from the India Gate to Jantar Mantar.

Media reported that about 1,300 supporters were detained by police in Delhi, including Arvind Kejriwal, Shanti Bhushan, Kiran Bedi and Manish Sisodia. Protesters reportedly courted arrest in different parts of the country. Opposition parties came out against the arrest, likening the government action to the emergency imposed in the country in 1975. Both houses of Parliament adjourned over the issue.

After four hours in detention Hazare was released unconditionally by the police, but refused to leave Tihar Jail. Hazare demanded unconditional permission to fast at Ramlila Maidan. Hazare continued his fast inside the jail.

After his arrest, Hazare received support from people across the country. There were reports of "nearly 570 demonstrations and protests by Anna supporters across the country". Due to the millions of protesters nationwide, the government allowed him to begin a public hunger strike of fifteen days. After talks with public authorities, Hazare decided to hold his protest at Ramlila Maidan, New Delhi. On 20 August Hazare "left the Tihar Jail for the Ramlila Grounds". Hazare promised reporters "he would fight to the 'last breath' until the government gets his team's Jan Lokpal Bill passed in this session of Parliament, which ends on 8 September."

==== Fast at Ramlila Maidan ====
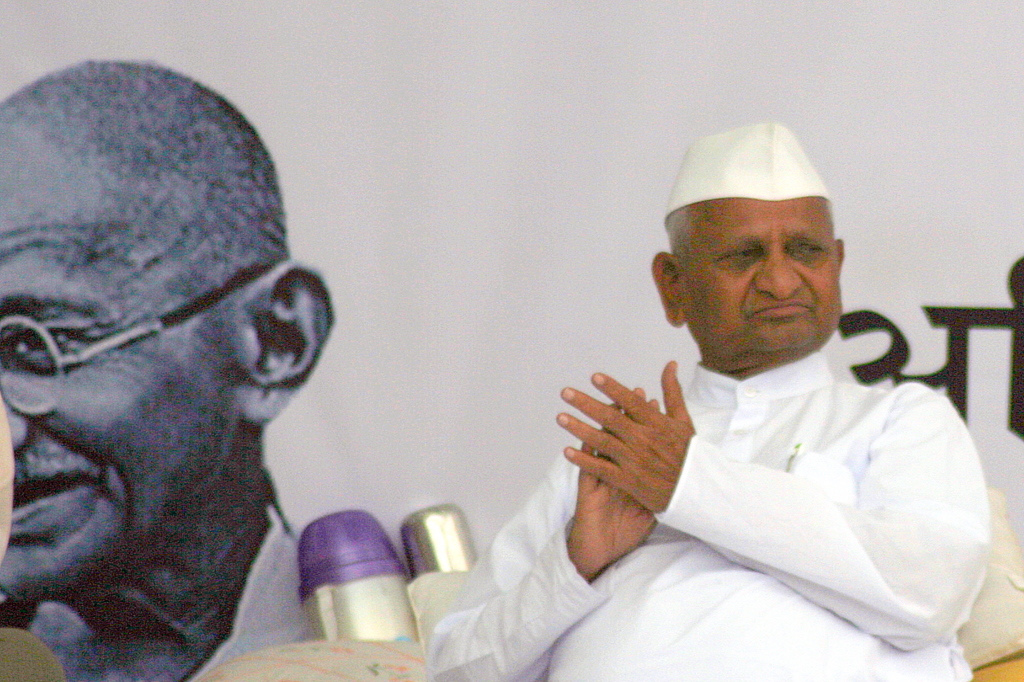
Anna Hazare on fast unto death protest.

On 20 August 2011 thousands came to show their support for Hazare, while "his advisers made television appearances to rally public support and defend themselves against criticism that their protest campaign and refusal to compromise is undermining India's parliamentary process." The National Campaign for People's Right to Information (NCPRI) condemned Hazare's deadline for passing the bill as undermining democracy, which operates by

"holding wide-ranging consultations and discussions, allowing for dissent and evolving a consensus.... He [Hazare] has the right to protest and dissent. But nobody can claim it as an absolute right and deny the right of dissent to others."

The Congress party confirmed that Maharashtra Additional Chief Secretary (Home) Umesh Chandra Sarangi, who had a history of mediating between Hazare and officials, was meeting "to find points of consensus and defuse the situation". On 21 August "tens of thousands" watched Hazare as he sat on an elevated platform. It was reported that Hazare at that point had "lost more than seven pounds since beginning his fast". Despite this he stated, "I will not withdraw my hunger strike until the Jan Lokpal bill is passed in the Parliament. I can die but I will not bend." Hazare ended his fast on 28 August, after the Lokpal Bill passed unanimously.

He was admitted to Medanta Medicity, Gurgaon for post-fast care. He had lost 7.5 kilograms (17 lb) and was very dehydrated after the 288-hour fast.

==== I Am Anna Campaign ====
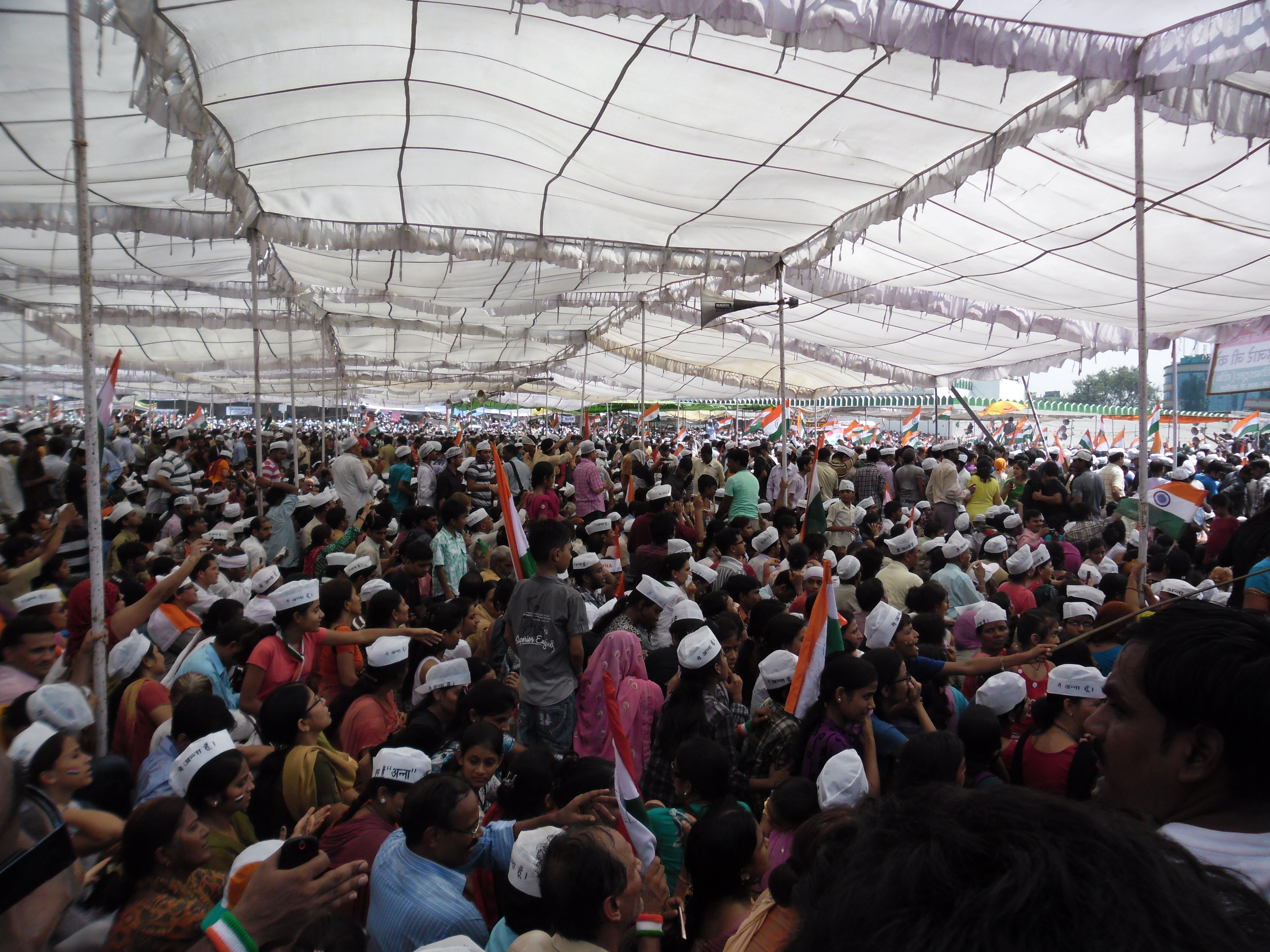
People wear I AM ANNA topi Gathered at Ramlila maidan on Anna Hazare's Fast

Within a few days of Anna Hazare's first fast demanding a strong Lokpal (on 5 April 2011), supporters started a campaign known as "I Am Anna Hazare", which was similar to the "We Are All Khaled Said" campaign from the Egyptian uprising. During Anna Hazare's second fast, his topi, the cap which became synonymous with Anna Hazare, became almost a fashion statement. Sales of the topis hit an all-time high. Kiran Bedi recommended that the "I am Anna" topi be displayed whenever someone asked for a bribe.

==== Fast on MMRDA ground ====
On 27 December 2011, Hazare began a 3-day hunger strike at MMRDA grounds, Bandra Kurla Complex, to demand a stronger Lokpal bill than was in debate. Hazare ended the fast on 28 December, after his doctors said that his kidneys might fail if he continued.

Before reaching the venue, Anna paid tribute to Mahatma Gandhi at Juhu Beach. On his way to a rally with several thousand people, he took two-and-half hours to reach the ground, passing through Santacruz, Tulip Star Hotel, Mithibai College, SV Road, Vile Parle, Khar and Bandra Highway.

A PIL petition filed against the fast was turned down by the Karnataka High Court. A judge noted that there was no public interest in the petition.

=== Electoral reform movement ===
In 2011, Hazare demanded an amendment to the electoral law to incorporate the option of None of the above in the electronic voting machines during the Indian elections. The "None of the above (NOTA)" is a ballot option that allows an electorate to indicate disapproval of all of the candidates in an electoral system, in case of non-availability of any candidate of his choice, as his Right to Reject. Soon, the Chief Election Commissioner of India Shahabuddin Yaqoob Quraishi supported Hazare's demand for the electoral reforms.

On 31 March 2013 Hazare started Jantantra Yatra from the city of Amritsar. He is expecting to address various issues, including electoral reforms such as the right to reject a candidate.

=== Protest against atrocities against Swami Ramdev and his supporters ===
On 8 June 2011 Anna Hazare and thousands of his supporters fasted from 10 am to 6 pm at Rajghat to protest against the midnight crackdown of 5 June by the Delhi Police on Swami Ramdev's fast at Ramlila ground protests. Anna Hazare held the Prime Minister of India responsible for the atrocities and termed the police action as an attempt to stifle democracy. According to one of Hazare's young supporters, the large presence of youths at the protest was due to his use of nonviolent protest, similar to Gandhi.

On 9 August 2013, Anna's office announced his anti-corruption organisation Bhrashtachar Virodhi Jan Andolan (BVJA) is no longer tackling corruption issues at a personal or social level. In an email circulated to India Against Corruption's membership, the veteran Gandhian's office has clarified that Anna "is now focused on Janlokpal, Right to Reject, Right to Recall, Farmers problems, Change in Education in System".

=== 2015 Land acquisition ordinance protest ===
In February 2015, he protested for two days at Jantar Mantar in Delhi against ordinance on the Land Acquisition, Rehabilitation and Resettlement Act, 2013.

== Other activities and controversies ==
Hazare has been accused of being an agent of Rashtriya Swayamsevak Sangh (RSS), a right-wing Hindutva paramilitary organisation. According to Digvijay Singh, a senior leader of the Indian National Congress, the entire crusade of 2011 Indian anti-corruption movement was planned by RSS in which "Plan-A was Baba Ramdev, while Plan-B was Anna Hazare". He further said their basic job was to disturb national security. Singh also charged Hazare with having links with late RSS leader Nanaji Deshmukh with whom he worked as a secretary. Hazare denied any such associations.

India's OPEN Magazine editorialised that it was "nonsense" to say Hazare's anti-corruption movement of 2011–12 was apolitical. The op-ed went on to say that the purpose of the movement was that, so long as the Congress Party was kept out of power, corrupt politicians of any other party could be elected to Parliament. The example of Ajay Chautala (now convicted for corruption) was cited. "In effect, Anna and his team are campaigning for Ajay Chautala effectively the first candidate put up for election by the India Against Corruption movement".

In a press conference in April 2011, Hazare praised Narendra Modi, the chief minister of Gujarat and Nitish Kumar, chief minister of Bihar for their efforts on rural development, saying that other chief ministers should emulate them. Subsequently, Modi wrote an open letter to him, hailing him as a Gandhian anti-corruption activist while Digvijay Singh criticised Hazare for his comment. In May 2011, during his visit to Gujarat, Hazare changed his view and criticised Modi for rampant corruption. He urged Modi to appoint a Lokayukta. He also commented that the media had projected an incorrect image of Vibrant Gujarat. Subsequently, Hazare declared that Modi is not a suitable candidate for the position of Prime Minister. He criticised Modi for not doing enough to curb corruption and his unwillingness to set up a Lokayukta in Gujarat. Hazare questioned Modi's secular credentials.

The government of the state of Maharashtra instituted a Commission of Inquiry under Justice PB Sawant in September 2003 to enquire into allegations of corruption against several people, including four ministers in the state as well as the "Hind Swaraj Trust" headed by Hazare. The Commission submitted its report on 22 February 2005, indicting the Trust for corruptly spending Rs. 220,000 on Hazare's birthday celebrations.

Hazare's lawyer Milind Pawar responded that the commission had remarked about "irregularities" in the accounts, but had not held him guilty of any "corrupt" practices. Pawar said that on 16 June 1998, a celebration was organised to congratulate Hazare on winning an award from a US–based NGO and it coincided with his 61st birthday. The trust spent Rs 218,000 for the function. Abhay Phirodia, a Pune-based industrialist, who took the initiative to organise this function donated an amount of Rs 248,950 to the trust by cheque soon afterwards. Hazare dared the government to file a First Information Report (FIR) against him to prove the charges.

In 2019, Hazare lamented the exploitation of his movement by the opposition of the Congress. He said "BJP used me in 2014. Everybody knows that it was my agitation for Lokpal that catapulted the BJP and also the Aam Aadmi Party (AAP) to power. Now I have lost all regards for them." He added the Narendra Modi government "is only misleading the people of the country and leading the country to autocracy".

== Conspiracy to murder Hazare ==
Hazare exposed corruption in cooperative sugar factories in Maharashtra, including one controlled by Dr. Padamsinh Bajirao Patil, a member of Parliament of 15th Lok Sabha and higher-ranking Leader of Nationalist Congress Party from Osmanabad. Patil was accused in the 2006 murder case of Congress leader Pawanraje Nimabalkar.

The conspiracy to kill Hazare was exposed when Parasmal Jain, an accused in the Nimbalkar murder case, in his written confession before a magistrate said that Patil had paid him ₹3,000,000 (US$31,150) to murder Nimbalkar, and also offered him supari (contract killing sum) to kill Anna Hazare. After this written confession, Hazare appealed to the state government of Maharashtra to lodge a separate First Information Report ( FIR ) against Patil but the government declined. On 26 September 2009 Hazare lodged his own complaint at Parner police station of Ahmednagar District in Maharashtra against Patil. Patil approached the High Court seeking anticipatory bail but on 14 October 2009, the Aurangabad bench of Bombay High Court rejected his application, observing that there was prima facie case against him. Padmasinh Patil appealed to the Supreme Court of India losing again, on 6 November 2009. On 11 November 2009 Patil surrendered before the sessions court in Latur and was sent to judicial remand for 14 days. On 16 December 2009 the Aurangabad bench granted bail.

As of December 2011, Hazare received Z+ security.

== Honours, awards and international recognition ==
| Year | Award | Awarding organisation |
|---|---|---|
| 2013 | Allard Prize for International Integrity | University of British Columbia Faculty of Law |
| 2011 | NDTV Indian of the Year with Arvind Kejriwal | NDTV |
| 2008 | Jit Gill Memorial Award | World Bank |
| 2005 | Honorary Doctorate | Gandhigram Rural University |
| 2003 | Integrity Award | Transparency International |
| 1999 | Leading Social Contributor Award | Government of India |
| 1998 | CARE International Award | CARE (relief agency) |
| 1997 | Mahaveer Award | |
| 1996 | Shiromani Award | |
| 1992 | Padma Bhushan | President of India |
| 1990 | Padma Shri | President of India |
| 1989 | Krushi Bhushana Award | Government of Maharashtra |
| 1986 | Indira Priyadarshini Vrikshamitra Awards | Government of India |

=== Film ===
- The Marathi film Mala Anna Vhaychay (I want to become Anna) is based on Hazare's work. The role of Hazare has been played by Arun Nalawade.
- Anna – a 2016 Indian Hindi-language biographical film based on the life of Anna Hazare by Shashank Udapurkar and starring Udapurkar as Hazare.
- Andolan Ek Suruvat Ek Shevat is a 2014 Indian Marathi-language film inspired by Hazare who also stars in a lead-role, his first such film work.

== Personal life ==
Hazare is unmarried. He has lived in a small room attached to the Sant Yadavbaba temple in Ralegan Siddhi since 1975. On 16 April 2011, he declared his bank balance of ₹67,183 (US$700) and ₹1,500 (US$20) as money in hand. He owns 0.07 hectares of family land in Ralegan Siddhi, which is being used by his brothers. He donated for village use two other pieces of land donated to him by the Indian Army and by a villager.

== Writings ==
- Hazare, Anna; Ganesh Pangare, Vasudha Lokur (1996). Adarsh Gaon Yojana: Government Participitation in a Peoples Program: Ideal Village Project of the Government of Maharashtra. Hind Swaraj Trust. p. 95.
- Hazare, Anna. My Village – My Sacred Land. New Delhi: CAPART.
- Hazare, Anna (1997). Ralegaon Siddhi: A Veritable Transformation. Translated by B.S. Pendse. Ralegan Siddhi Pariwar Prakashan.
- Hazare, Anna (2007). वाट ही संघर्षाची (in Marathi). Pune: Signet Publications.

== See also ==
- Hartal
