= Aaron Jakubenko =

Australian actor

- Born: 8 December 1988 (age 37)
- Occupation: Actor
- Years active: 2010–present
- Partner(s): Ashleigh Cummings (2016–present)

Aaron Jakubenko (born 8 December 1988) is an Australian actor. He is known for playing Yuri in Conspiracy 365 and Augie McTeer in Tidelands. He also played the main character of Commodus, based on the historical figure Commodus, in the Netflix-series Roman Empire's first season and one of the main characters in the American teen series titled The Shannara Chronicles. Jakubenko played the recurring role of Robbo Slade in Neighbours and Jean Beazley's (Nadine Garner) son Jack in The Doctor Blake Mysteries.

== Filmography ==
=== Television ===
Year	Title	Role	Notes
2018	Tidelands	Augie McTeer	8 episodes
2017	A Man for Every Month	Scott	Hallmark Movie
2016–17	The Shannara Chronicles	Ander Elessedil	10 episodes
2016	Roman Empire: Reign of Blood	Commodus	6 episodes
2014	The Doctor Blake Mysteries	Jack Beazley	Episode: "An Invincible Summer"
2013	Neighbours	Robbo Slade	21 episodes
2013	Spartacus: War of the Damned	Sabinus	4 episodes
2012	Conspiracy 365	Yuri	7 episodes
2012	Australia on Trial	Hugh Miller	Episode: "The Mount Rennie Outrage"

=== Film ===
Year	Title	Role
2021	Great White	Charlie
2016	Spirit of the Game	Delyle Condie
2013	Blinder	Dawson
2012	Tower of Ablutions	Burgess
2011	Underbelly Files: The Man Who Got Away	Official
2010	The Ballad of Des & Mo	Evil
