= Nutty Putty Cave =

Closed cave in Utah, United States

- Location within Utah Location within the United States
- Coordinates: 40°05′51″N 112°02′13″W
- Discovery: 1960 (by Dale Green)
- Geology: Chert
- Entrances: 1 (closed off)
- Difficulty: Slippery
- Hazards: Slippery and tight
- Access: None (permanently closed since 2009)

Nutty Putty Cave is a hydrothermal cave located west of Utah Lake in Utah County, Utah, United States. The cave attracted amateur and professional cavers alike despite its narrow passageways, but access to the cave was closed in 2009, after an accident that resulted in the death of 26-year-old John Edward Jones. Before that, it was popular among Boy Scout troops and college students.

== Discovery and exploration ==
The cave, first explored in 1960 by Dale Green and friends, is currently owned by the Utah School and Institutional Trust Lands Administration, and was managed before its closure by the Utah Timpanogos Grotto caving club. The cave system was named after the putty-like texture of the soft, brown clay found in many of its passages. Green originally thought of calling it "Silly Putty" but later decided "Nutty Putty" sounded better. The clay-like texture is composed of silicon dioxide commonly found in sand. Because the cave was formed upward with superheated water forming limestone, many additional minerals make up the complex structure. It contains 1,400 feet (430m) of chutes and tunnels and, prior to closure, had been accessible via a narrow surface hole.

Before 2009, the cave saw four separate rescues of cavers and Boy Scouts who got stuck inside its tight twists, turns, and crawls. In 2006, an effort was made to limit the number of visitors allowed inside. It was estimated the cave was receiving over 5,000 visitors per year, many of them entering late at night and failing to take proper safety precautions. The cave's popularity had caused excessive smoothing of the rock inside to the point it was predicted a fatality would occur in one of the cave's more prominent features, a 45-degree room called "The Big Slide". A gate was installed on May 24, 2006, and the cave was temporarily closed. In early 2009, proper management was established and an application process was developed to ensure safety precautions were being met. On May 18, 2009, the cave was reopened to the public.

== 2009 fatality and cave closure ==
Diagram of where John Jones was trapped.

On November 24, 2009, John Edward Jones (January 21, 1983 – November 25, 2009), a 26-year-old medical student and Utah native, became stuck upside down in a narrow crevice while exploring the cave with a group of family and friends. After around 27 hours of being stuck and extensive rescue efforts, Jones was pronounced dead at 11:56 pm on November 25.

=== Incident ===
Jones and three others, among them Jones' brother Josh, had left their group of eleven in search of "The Birth Canal", a tight but navigable passageway with a turnaround at the end. Jones entered an unmapped passageway near an area now referred to as "Ed's Push", which he wrongly believed to be the Canal, and continued through it. Five years earlier, a 16-year-old boy named Brock Clark had gotten stuck in the "Corkscrew" portion of Ed's Push, but was rescued after 14 hours. Unable to turn around at the place Clark had, Jones continued forward and found himself at a dead end, with nowhere to go besides a narrow vertical downward fissure. Believing this to be the turnaround, he entered head-first, then became stuck upside down. The fissure measured 10 by 18 inches (25 by 46 cm) and was located 400 feet (120 m) from the entrance of the cave.

Josh Jones reached the area feet first and tried to pull his brother up with his legs, to no avail, and ultimately headed back out of Ed's Push to seek help. Jones remained stuck in the upside down position, with gravity slowly pulling him down further into the hole and the tight space constricting his chest and limiting his breathing. A large team of rescue workers came to his assistance. A worker with a rope tied to her foot tried pulling Jones up with her hands, also to no avail. After this, the workers set up a sophisticated rope-and-pulley system in an attempt to extricate him, having freed Clark the same way, and were able to give him a communication device to talk with his wife Emily. However, Jones was in agony during the pulley process due to his bloodflow having left his legs, turning them blue; his legs also kept hitting the cave ceiling, with rescuers considering breaking his legs to make his body more navigable. The pulley system managed to improve Jones' positioning, allowing rescuer Ryan Shurz to make eye contact with him and give him a refreshment. However, the pulley system snapped under strain, with one of the nodes hitting Shurz in the face and wounding him to where he needed to evacuate; Jones, meanwhile, plunged back into the hole. By the time the pulley system was restored, Jones was unresponsive. A medic verified that Jones had ultimately suffered cardiac arrest and died due to the strain placed upon his body over many hours by his inverted, compressed position.

=== Aftermath ===
After rescuers concluded it would be too dangerous to attempt to retrieve his body, the landowner and Jones's family came to an agreement that the cave would be sealed, with the cave as his final resting place, and as a memorial to Jones. Explosives were used to collapse the ceiling in the Ed's Push passageway of the cave, close to where Jones's body was. All entry points to the cave were permanently sealed by filling them with concrete, making the cave system inaccessible.

Some cavers opposed the cave's closure. Facebook community groups petitioned to save the cave but failed. Although cavers had cut their way through a gated entrance to the property prior to the closure of the cave, they were apprehended by security officials before they could reach it and charged with trespassing entry. Today, the site of the entrance is accessible, though the entrance itself is sealed off by the concrete and overgrown. Tributes to Jones, including plaques and a tombstone, can be found at the site.

A film about the incident titled The Last Descent was released on September 16, 2016. In 2025, a detailed recreation of the Nutty Putty cave was added to the virtual reality video game, Cave Crave, allowing gamers to explore the cave for themselves. Brandon Kowallis, one of the rescuers and the last person to see Jones alive, provided narration for the recreation that can be found via audio tapes collected throughout the recreation, and did a Let's Play of it for his YouTube channel that October.

In May 2026, previously unseen footage from the 2009 incident and rescue attempt was obtained by and released to the public by the YouTube channel EWU Unsolved.

== See also ==
- Vortex Spring
- Floyd Collins – victim of Sand Cave incident, Kentucky, 1925
- Neil Moss incident – similar caving accident in the United Kingdom, 1959
- Cave rescue
