= Hubert Gough =

British Army general (1870–1963)

General Sir Hubert Gough GCB GCMG KCVO
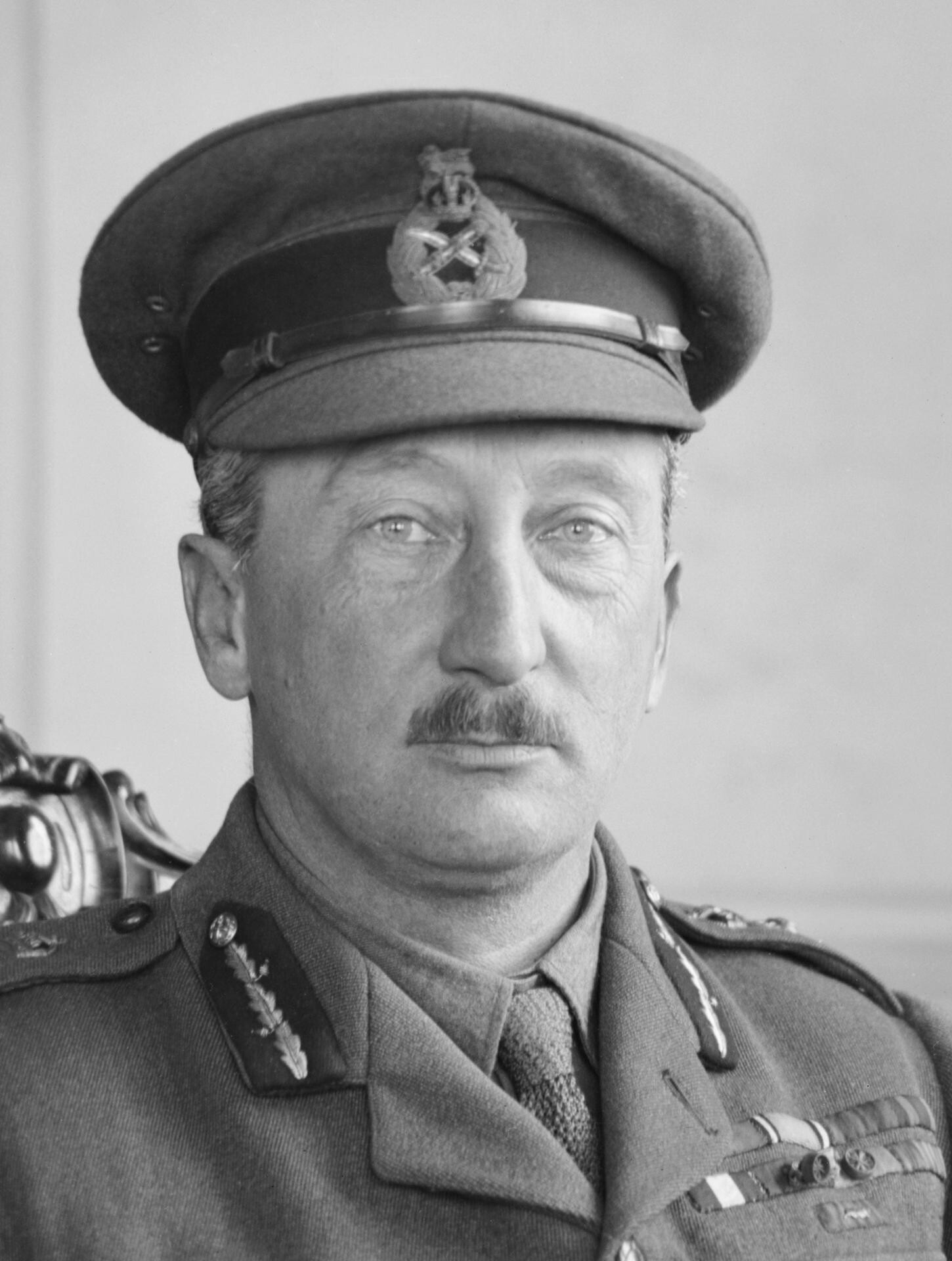
- Gough in 1916
- Born: 12 August 1870; London, England
- Died: 18 March 1963 (aged 92); London, England
- Burial place: Camberley, Surrey, England
- Spouse: Margaret Louisa Nora Lewes
- Relatives: Sir Charles Gough (father); Sir Hugh Gough (uncle); Sir John Gough (brother)
- Military career
- Allegiance: United Kingdom
- Branch: British Army
- Service years: 1888–1922
- Rank: General
- Commands: Fifth Army; I Corps; 7th Division; 3rd Cavalry Brigade; 16th (Queen's) Lancers
- Conflicts: Tirah campaign; Second Boer War; Siege of Ladysmith; Relief of Ladysmith; World War I; Western Front; Battle of Mons; Battle of Le Cateau; First Battle of Ypres; Battle of Aubers; Battle of Loos; Battle of the Somme; Battle of Flers-Courcelette; Battle of Passchendaele; Operation Michael; Russian Civil War; British campaign in the Baltic (1918–1919)
- Awards: Knight Grand Cross of the Order of the Bath; Knight Grand Cross of the Order of St Michael and St George; Knight Commander of the Royal Victorian Order

General Sir Hubert de la Poer Gough (/ɡɒf/ GOF; 12 August 1870 – 18 March 1963) was a senior officer in the British Army in the First World War. A controversial figure, he was a favourite of the commander-in-chief of the British Expeditionary Force on the Western Front, Field Marshal Sir Douglas Haig, and the youngest of Haig's field army commanders.

Gough was educated at Eton and the Royal Military College, Sandhurst, before commissioning into the 16th Lancers in 1889. His early career included notable service in the Second Boer War, and a more controversial role in the Curragh incident, in which he was one of the leading officers who threatened to accept dismissal rather than deploy into Protestant Ulster.

Gough experienced a meteoric rise during the First World War, from command of a cavalry brigade in August 1914, to division command at the First Battle of Ypres that autumn, to a corps at the Battle of Loos a year later. From mid-1916 he commanded the Reserve Army (later renamed the Fifth Army) during the Battle of the Somme in 1916 and the Battle of Passchendaele in 1917. His tenure was marked by controversy around his leadership style, his perceived reputation as "a thruster", (Note: The word comes from the Regency and Victorian hunting field and is a reference to Gough's youthful reputation as a rider.) and the efficiency of the organisation of his army, especially relative to the reputation for caution and efficiency of General Sir Herbert Plumer's Second Army. Fifth Army bore the initial brunt of the German spring offensive in March 1918, but Gough was scapegoated and relieved of his command.

After the war, he briefly held a command in the Baltic until retirement in 1922, and stood unsuccessfully for Parliament. After a brief spell at farming, he made a new career for himself as a company director. Gough gradually re-emerged as an influential figure in military circles and public life, writing two volumes of memoirs. He was a senior commander in the London Home Guard in the Second World War and lived long enough to be interviewed on television in the early 1960s. Historians continue to study Gough's career as a case study of how the BEF coped with rapid expansion, with officers commanding forces far larger than during their peacetime experience, of the degree of initiative which should be granted to subordinates, and of the evolution of operational planning under stalemate conditions, from an initial emphasis on achieving breakthrough (with attrition regarded as preliminary "wearing out") to a stress on cautious advances under cover of massive, concentrated artillery fire.

== Early life ==
Gough was born in London on 12 August 1870. He was born into an Anglo-Irish military family, the eldest son of General Charles John Stanley Gough As an infant, Gough went to India with his family late in 1870, but Gough and his brother Johnny were sent to a boarding school in England, and Gough did not meet his father, who was on active service in the Second Afghan War, again until he was sixteen.

== Early career ==
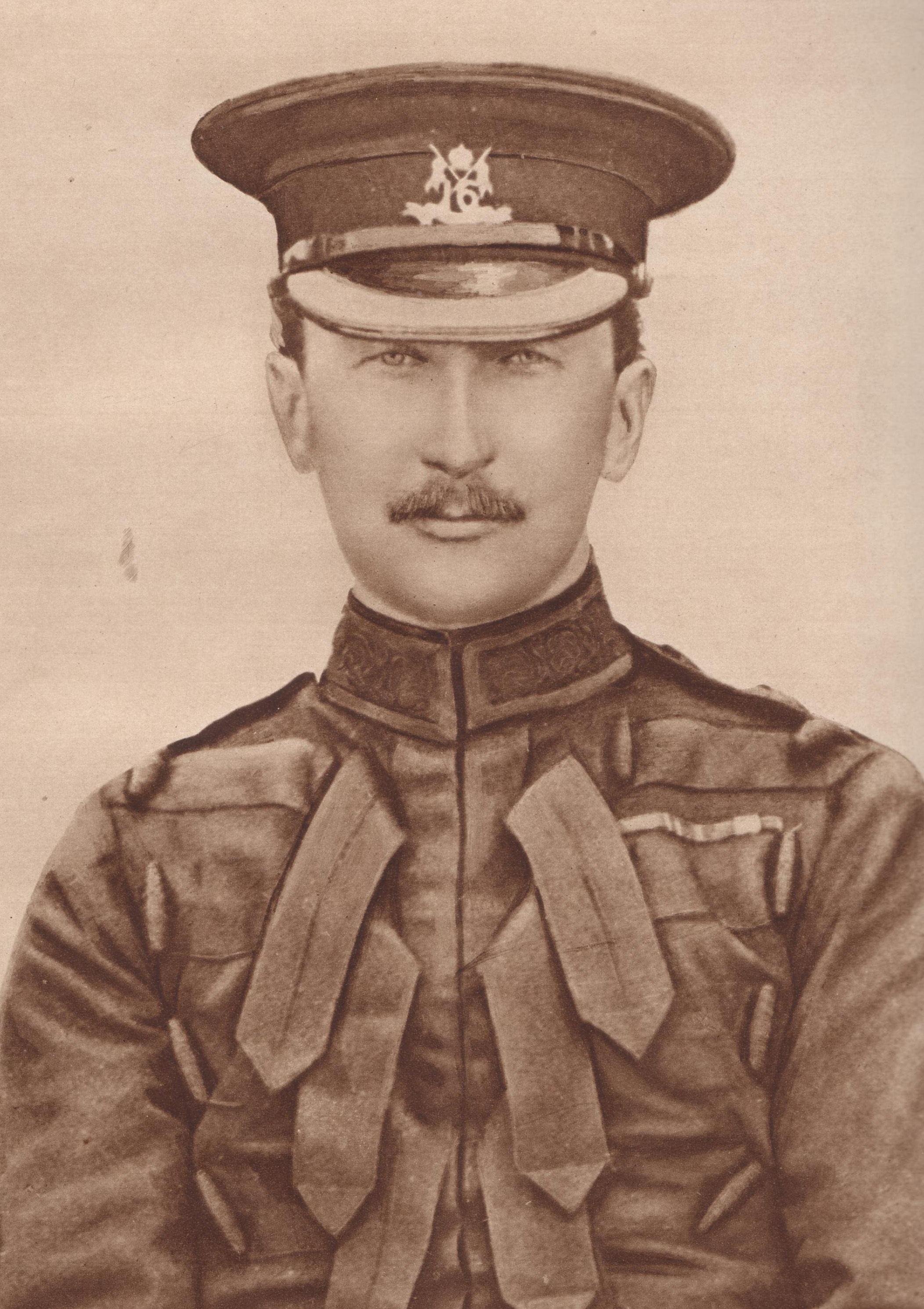
Gough as a junior officer

Gough was educated at Eton College then at the Royal Military College, Sandhurst. He was gazetted into the 16th Lancers as a second lieutenant on 5 March 1889. He distinguished himself as a rider, winning the Regimental Cup, and as a polo player with many of his horses provided for him by wealthier officers.

Gough was promoted to lieutenant on 23 July 1890, and set out for India that autumn. He was promoted captain on 22 December 1894 at the relatively early age of 24. He served with the Tirah Field Force 1897–98 and on the Northwest Frontier.

Gough returned to England in June 1898, and sat the examination for entrance to the Staff College, Camberley. He married Margaret Louisa Nora Lewes (known as "Daisy") on 22 December 1898.

== Boer War ==
Gough started at Staff College, Camberley, on 9 January 1899 but did not complete the course. Instead he was ordered on special service to South Africa on 25 October 1899, reaching Cape Town on 15 November. He was deployed to Natal as instructor to one of the Rifle Associations (locally raised units of volunteer mounted infantry or light cavalry). Gough then served as ADC to Douglas Cochrane, 12th Earl of Dundonald, who was commanding mounted troops in Natal. In January 1900 he was promoted to brigade intelligence officer, a role which required a great deal of scouting.

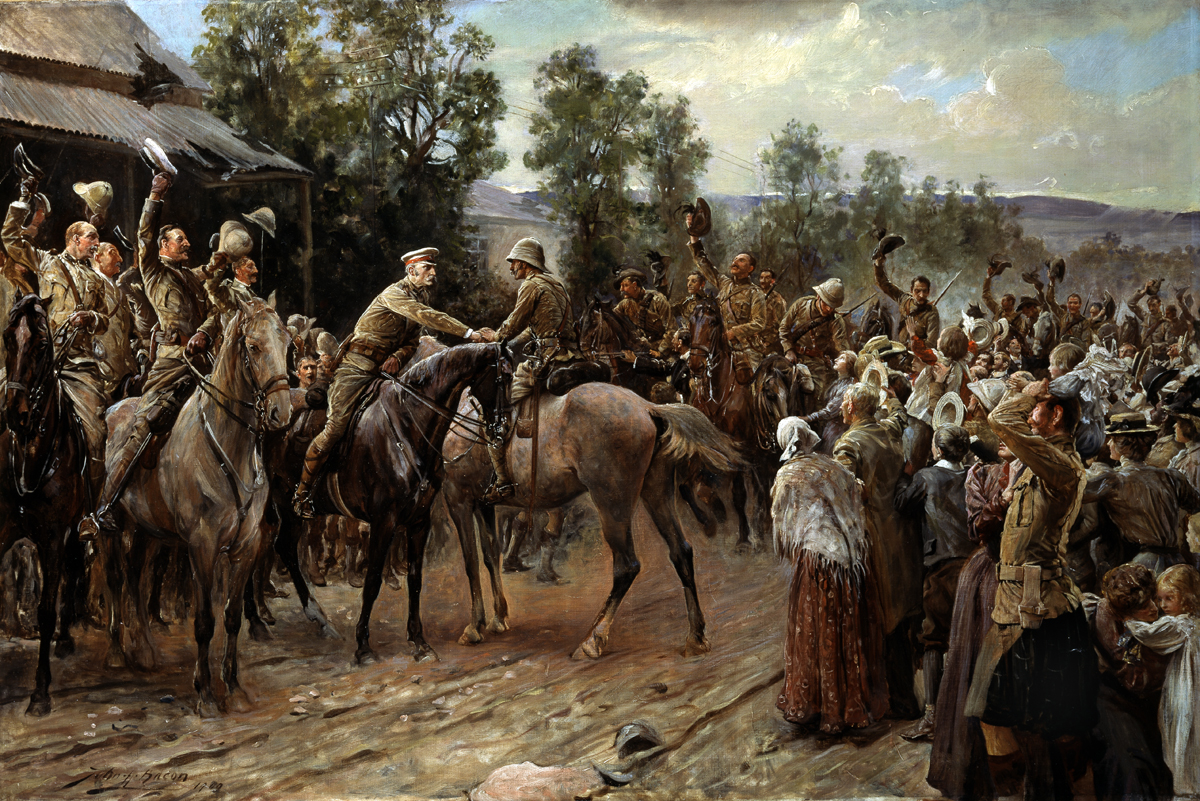
The Relief of Ladysmith. Sir George White greets Lord Dundonald on 28 February 1900. Painting by John Henry Frederick Bacon.

On 1 February Gough was appointed, as a local unpaid major, CO of a Composite Regiment (a squadron of Imperial Light Horse, a squadron of Natal Carbineers and a company of 60th Rifles Mounted Infantry). He led his regiment to assist Buller's third attempt (5–7 February) to cross the Tugela River, and in the fourth attempt (14–27 February). He defied written orders from Dundonald to lead the first British troops into Ladysmith (28 February), meeting his brother Johnnie who had been besieged inside the town. His meeting with George Stuart White was widely portrayed.

During the ensuing period of guerrilla warfare, Gough's Regiment was reinforced to a strength of 600 men. Along with Horace Smith-Dorrien and Edmund Allenby, he served under the overall command of Lieutenant-General John French. On 17 September 1901, after poor reconnaissance, he attacked near Blood River Poort, but was taken prisoner with his entire force by larger Boer forces which had been out of sight. He later escaped. Gough was invalided home with a wounded right hand in January 1902,

== Edwardian era ==
Gough returned as a Regular Army captain in the 16th Lancers on 23 August 1902, but the following month was appointed brigade major of the 1st Cavalry Brigade at Aldershot on 24 September 1902 with promotion to the substantive rank of major on 22 October 1902. His brevet rank of lieutenant colonel took effect the following day (23 October 1902).

Gough was appointed an instructor at the Staff College on 1 January 1904 and served there until 1906 under Colonel Sir Henry Rawlinson as the college's commandant. Gough was the first instructor to win the college point-to-point. Gough was promoted brevet colonel on 11 June 1906 and substantive lieutenant colonel on 18 July 1906, continuing to serve at the Staff College. He was appointed commanding officer (CO) of the 16th (Queen's) Lancers on 15 December 1907. He was still the youngest lieutenant colonel in the army.

After a fortnight on half-pay from 19 December 1910, Gough was promoted temporary brigadier general and appointed general officer commanding (GOC) of the 3rd Cavalry Brigade at the Curragh (1 January 1911). In June 1912 he was created a CB in the 1912 Birthday Honours.

== Curragh incident ==
With Irish Home Rule due to become law in 1914, the Cabinet were contemplating some form of military action against the Ulster Volunteers who wanted no part of it. Gough was one of the leading officers who threatened to accept dismissal in the ensuing Curragh incident.

On the morning of Friday 20 March, Arthur Paget (Commander-in-Chief, Ireland) addressed senior officers at his headquarters in Dublin. By Gough's account (in his memoirs Soldiering On), he said that "active operations were to commence against Ulster", that officers who lived in Ulster would be permitted to "disappear" for the duration, but that other officers who refused to serve against Ulster would be dismissed rather than being permitted to resign, and that Gough – who had a family connection with Ulster but did not live there – could expect no mercy from his "old friend at the War Office" (Sir John French). French, Paget and Spencer Ewart had in fact (on 19 March) agreed to exclude officers with "direct family connections" to Ulster. In making an ultimatum, Paget was acting foolishly, as most might have obeyed a direct order. Paget ended the meeting by ordering his officers to speak to their subordinates and then report back. Gough also sent a telegram to his brother Johnnie, Douglas Haig's Chief of Staff at Aldershot. Gough did not attend the second meeting in the afternoon, at which Paget stated that the purpose of the move was to overawe Ulster rather than fight.

That evening Paget informed the War Office by telegram that 57 officers preferred to accept dismissal (it was actually 61 including Gough). Gough was suspended from duty and he and two of his three colonels were summoned to the War Office to explain themselves.

=== "The peccant paragraphs" ===
Gough sent a telegram to the elderly Field-Marshal Lord Roberts (who had been lobbying the King and arguing with John French (Chief of the Imperial General Staff) on the telephone), purporting to ask for advice, although possibly to goad him into further action. After being reassured by Roberts that the deployment into Ulster was purely precautionary, he confirmed to Spencer Ewart (on the morning of Sunday 22 March) that he would have obeyed a direct order.

In another meeting at the War Office (23 March), Gough, (possibly influenced by Major-General Henry Hughes Wilson), demanded a written guarantee from French and Ewart that the Army would not be used against Ulster. At another meeting Secretary of State for War John Seely accepted French's suggestion that a written document from the Army Council might help to convince Gough's officers. The Cabinet approved a text, stating that the Army Council were satisfied that the incident had been a misunderstanding, and that it was "the duty of all soldiers to obey lawful commands", to which Seely added two paragraphs, stating that the Government had the right to use the "forces of the Crown" in Ireland or elsewhere, but had no intention of using force "to crush opposition to the Home Rule Bill".

At another meeting after 4 pm Gough, on the advice of Henry Wilson (also present), demanded a further paragraph stating that the Army would not be used to enforce Home Rule on Ulster, with which French concurred in writing. When H. H. Asquith (Prime Minister) learned of this he demanded that Gough return the document, which he refused to do. Asquith publicly repudiated the "peccant paragraphs" (25 March). French and Seely both had to resign.

== First World War ==
=== Early war ===
==== Cavalry brigade: Mons to the Marne ====
At the outbreak of war in August 1914, Gough took the 3rd Cavalry Brigade to France, under the command of Allenby (GOC Cavalry Division). On 22 August one of Gough's artillery batteries was the first British battery to open fire on the Germans. The brigade fought at the Battle of Mons (23 August). During the following days Gough detached himself from Allenby's command and linked up with Haig's I Corps on the BEF right. Allenby publicly laughed this off as "only Gough's little way" but was privately furious at French (Commander-in-Chief of the British Expeditionary Force (BEF)) and Haig's tolerance of Gough's behaviour; relations between Allenby and Gough were strained thereafter.

The brigade fought at the Battle of Le Cateau (26 August). By 1 September they were at Villers-Cotterêts, south of the Aisne, after a retreat of 180 miles (100 miles as the crow flies), assisting a rearguard of Irish Guards (part of I Corps) in the last major action of the retreat. On 5 September Gough linked up for the first time with British transport and supplies.

==== Cavalry division ====
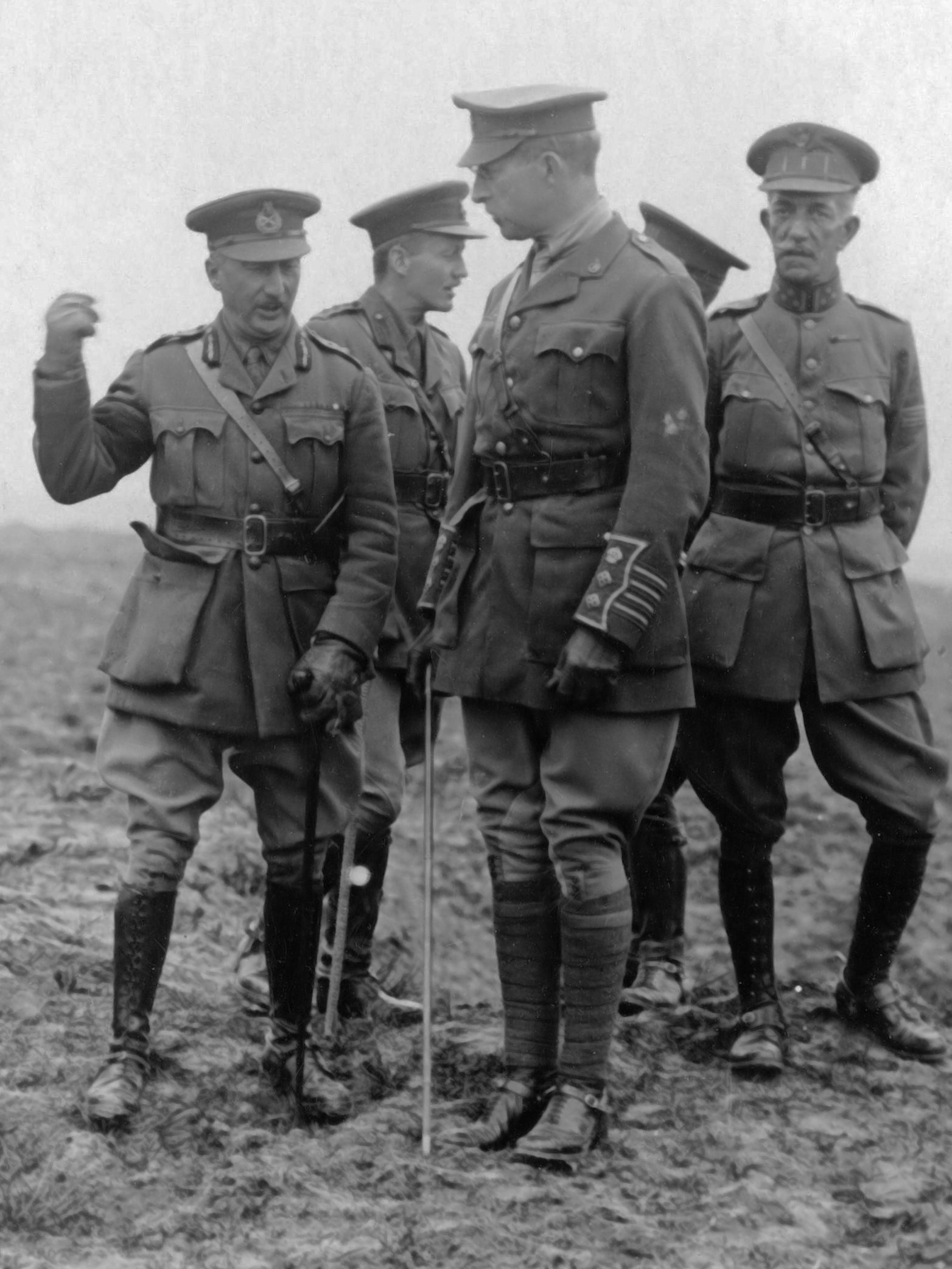
Gough (left) and King Albert I of Belgium

By the time of the Battle of the Marne 3rd and 5th Cavalry Brigades had been formed into "Gough's Command", an ad hoc cavalry force separate from Allenby's Cavalry Division. On 15 September Gough's Command, with the addition of supporting troops, was formed into 2nd Cavalry Division and he was appointed the division's GOC on 16 September. The two cavalry divisions were formed into a Cavalry Corps under Allenby (9 September), and reached the Belgian border by train on 11 September.

The 2nd Cavalry Division was on the western flank of the BEF, and tried to turn the German west flank, but was ordered to halt by Allenby. On 14 October Gough linked up with the IV Corps, under Lieutenant General Sir Henry Rawlinson, moving down from the coast, removing the danger of being cut off. Gough advanced again but met new German forces trying to turn the British flank; on 16 and 17 October the Germans held the river Lys against Gough. Entrenchment began on 20 October. Gough's division, sometimes with as few as 2,000 men in the front line, was defending around Messines and Wytschaete. Gough was promoted major-general on 26 October backdated to 15 September. From 30 October to the night of 31 October – 1 November Gough's small division, assisted by Indian and London Scottish Territorial troops, held Messines-Wytschaete Ridge against a strong attack from the south-east by Max von Fabeck.

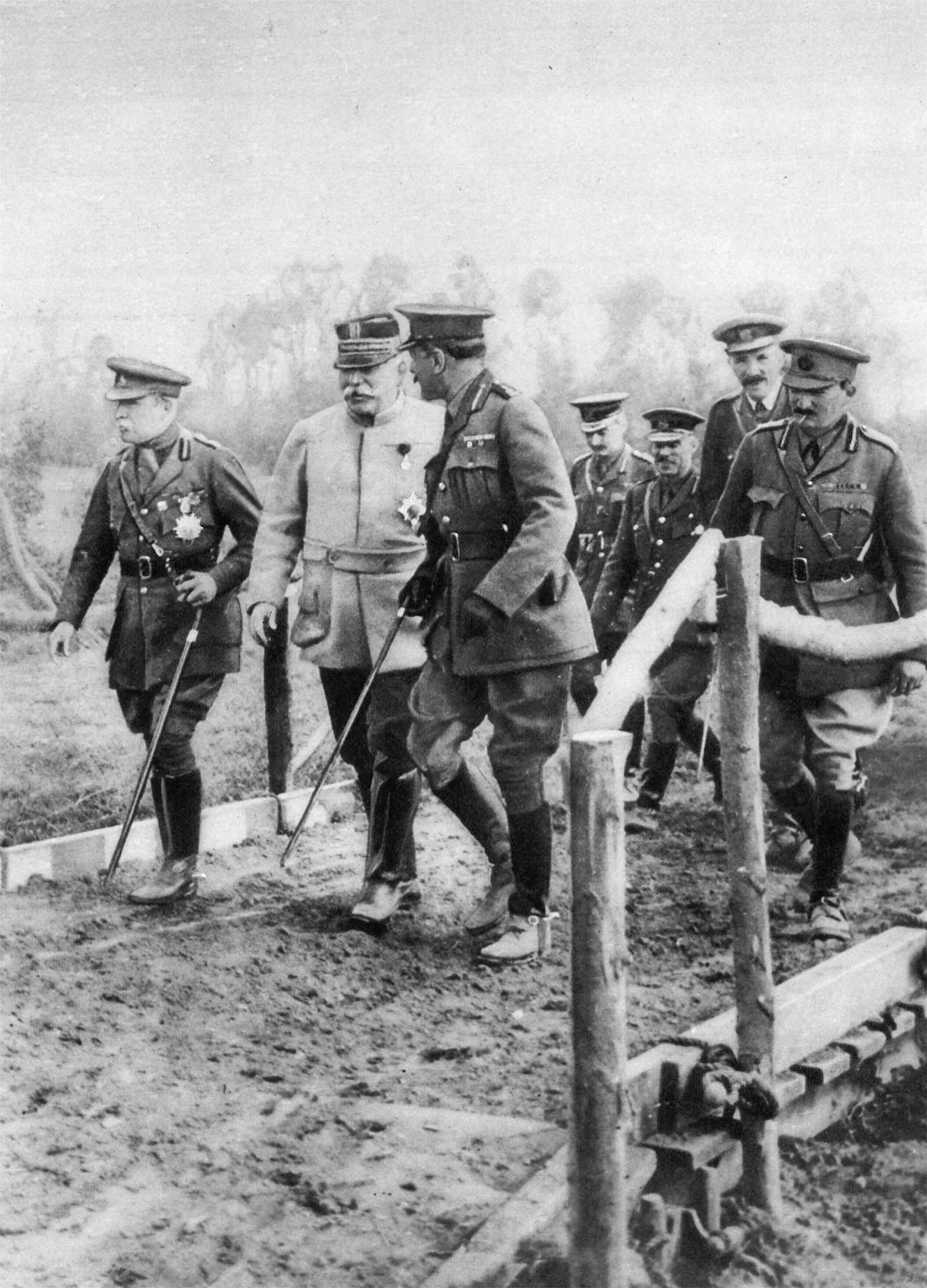
Sir John French, Joseph Joffre and Sir Douglas Haig (left to right) visit the front line in 1915. Gough is on the extreme right, next to Sir Henry Wilson.

Gough's division returned to the front at Hooge, near Ypres, on 12 February 1915. On 13 February he was offered a command in the planned Salonika expedition (in the event these troops were sent to Gallipoli) but declined after consulting his brother and BEF Chief of Staff "Wully" Robertson. Johnnie Gough died of wounds later in February. Haig, a shy man, liked Gough for his wit and open personality, and to some extent he replaced his brother as Haig's confidant. Haig asked for Gough to be attached to his forces in case he "br[oke] the enemy line" at Neuve Chapelle (10–13 March); Gough's division was in GHQ Reserve for that battle.

==== Infantry division ====
Gough was appointed GOC of 7th Division on 18 April 1915, part of Rawlinson's IV Corps, itself part of Haig's First Army; Gough may have been appointed as a counterbalance to Rawlinson, with whom Haig had a wary relationship. 7th division was in reserve at Second Ypres (22 April).

Gough commanded 7th Division at the Battle of Aubers Ridge in May. It was in corps reserve on 9 May, and that night was ordered to relieve 8th Division in the line, ready to attack the next day. After protests from the brigadiers that the support trenches were full of men – alive, wounded and dead – Gough cancelled the relief on his own authority. He expected to be disciplined by Rawlinson, but instead his division was redeployed to the sector of Charles Monro's I Corps, where diversionary attacks were to be mounted to assist the French.

Monro gave Gough and his artillery officer "Curly" Birch great freedom. They bombarded for a few minutes, leaving a gap to tempt the Germans out of their shelters (repeated several times in preceding days), bringing some guns forward on muffled wheels for surprise. The assault began at 3:15 am on 16 May; the right of 7th Division was the only part of I Corps attack to succeed. The next day Gough made little further progress despite help from almost every First Army gun in range.

=== Corps commander: Loos ===
==== Planning ====
Gough was appointed GOC I Corps, still part of Haig's First Army, and promoted temporary lieutenant-general on 13 July 1915.

During the upcoming Battle of Loos Haig (13 August) had asked Gough to plan to take the Hohenzollern Redoubt (roughly north-east), while Rawlinson's IV Corps was to take Loos and possibly Hill 70 (roughly south-east) to open a gap for the reserves to push due east to take Hulluch. Gough (22 August) proposed that 9th (Scottish) Division should "rush" the German positions on his left (Hohenzollern Redoubt, Fosse 8) just before dawn (4 am) after a barrage and gas attack, while the following night 7th Division would push through the Quarries to Citie St Elie.

==== Gough's attacks ====
On 25 September chlorine gas was released to assist the British attack, despite unfavourable wind likely to blow it back over British troops. Although Captain Ernest Gold (meteorological officer) and Maj-Gen Henry Horne (GOC 2nd Division) were later blamed, Charles Foulkes (the gas officer) later hinted that "still higher authority" may have been responsible, and a gas officer Lt Sewill recorded being told that the order came from Gough. At 5:20 am Gough had advised Haig that it was too late to cancel the gas release. However, Nick Lloyd argues that the fault lay with Haig for agreeing to the plan.

On Gough's left 2nd Division met heavy losses. On Gough's right 7th Division captured the enemy first line with heavy loss. Gough was away from his HQ for two hours trying to discover why 28 Brigade (in his centre) were not making progress. Major-General George Thesiger, GOC 9th (Scottish) Division, "dissociated" himself from Gough's orders to attack again at noon. Orders reached the two forward battalions just before noon; they attacked hastily at heavy loss. The divisional history (1921) was scathing about this episode, of which Gough's memoirs later made little mention. Nick Lloyd argues that Gough displayed the impatient aggression for which he was later to become notorious.

Between 27 September and 5 October Gough ordered 28th Division to retake Fosse 8, taken briefly by the British on 26 September. The division commander Maj-Gen Edward Bulfin and his subordinate Brig-Gen Cecil Pereira (85 Brigade) later recalled Gough constantly ordering attacks without proper artillery support. 28th Division fought hard in wet weather, winning two Victoria Crosses, but were much criticised by Haig and Gough, who issued them a stinging twelve point rebuke on 6 October. Gough later recorded in his memoirs that he himself had been under great pressure from Haig to attack and make progress.

==== Ousting of Sir John French ====
Gough began a corps-level inquiry into the lessons of the battle (10 October), which was followed by a First Army inquiry (20 October). Gough's inquiry found that attacks had been stymied by lack of grenades, but had come close to a breakthrough where the wind had carried British gas over the German lines.

Gough was one of the senior officers who criticised French's command of the BEF to Lord Haldane (9 October 1915) and King George V (24 October 1915). Haig succeeded French, who was forced to "resign" as C-in-C.

==== Military ideas ====
Gough later commented on the draft of the Official History (1926) that a limited attack at Loos would have been more sensible, as it could have been reinforced if Joseph Joffre's offensive succeeded, and was critical of Haig for – as so often – attempting to achieve decisive victory with insufficient means.

Notes from a conference held by Gough on 20 December 1915 show that he still thought in terms of the principles of warfare as taught at Staff College: he still expected an "advance guard" to move forward until, after two or three days, a plan had been decided on for deploying the bulk of British forces, whereas in reality, by 1917, the opening day would often prove the most effective. Like many British generals, he blamed the failures of 1915 on human error in applying the principles of warfare, rather than on the need to concentrate artillery, learn new tactics, and allow senior officers to gain experience.

=== The Somme 1916 ===
==== Initial phases ====
===== Training cavalry and plans for exploitation =====
Haig told Gough, who in January 1916 was made KCB, to be prepared to take I Corps up to Flanders. Haig had not completely abandoned his hopes of a Flanders offensive at least as late as June.

Gough was appointed GOC Reserve Corps, which was to exploit any breakthrough achieved at the Somme, on 4 April 1916. Gough spent most of the next two months supervising the training of the cavalry divisions. Gough's staff had to liaise with XIII and XV Corps (on the right of General Sir Henry Rawlinson's Fourth Army) to draw up contingency plans in case "things went as we hoped for" and with Lieutenant General Claud Jacob, whose II Corps was also earmarked for the exploitation. By mid-June Gough was also training the 1st Indian Cavalry Division and 2nd Indian Cavalry Division. In May, after discussions with Rawlinson, Gough proposed to use a cavalry brigade in the north (the Ancre Valley) and another in the south (Montauban), to assist if the Germans collapsed. Haig, thinking the ground unsuitable, vetoed his suggestion that a further entire cavalry division should be used in the north to help roll up the enemy second line. (Note: The enemy lines were closer together north of the Albert-Bapaume Road, but the ground hillier and less favourable for the attacker. At this stage Haig's plan was to capture the first and second German lines in the northern sector, including the high ground around Thiepval and Pozières, and then conduct a shallow exploitation south-east along the ridge, possibly linking up with a thrust from Montauban to encircle the Germans in between.)

Reserve Corps was renamed Reserve Army on 22 May 1916, In late June, despite the Battle of Verdun reducing the planned French contribution from 39 divisions to twelve, Haig's plans became more aggressive. Instead of exploiting southeast to cover the flank of a French crossing of the Somme, Haig (memo to Rawlinson 16 June, Haig diary 21 June) now wrote that once Pozières Ridge was taken Gough was to exploit northeast to Bapaume and then once reinforced turn north to Monchy to take the German Arras positions in "flank and reverse". Haig told Gough (diary 27 June) he was "too inclined to aim at fighting a battle at Bapaume" but should instead aim to push on, before the Germans had a chance to attack him from the north. Haig would have preferred Gough to take command of the two left hand corps (VIII Corps and X Corps) prior to the attack but instead, that evening, approved Rawlinson's plan for Gough to set up HQ at Albert as soon as the Pozières Heights had fallen. By now Reserve Army had three infantry and three cavalry divisions. Research by Stephen Badsey among the surviving evidence suggests that the final plan was for Gough to exploit any breakthrough with the 25th Division, followed by two of the three cavalry divisions, then the II Corps (three divisions).

===== Battle of Albert =====
In the afternoon of 1 July Haig, not yet aware of how badly the northern attack had gone, visited Gough and ordered him to "move up" in the evening. Gough visited Rawlinson in the afternoon (the third time that day) but was told that there would be no breakthrough that day, so he ordered cavalry to return to billets. At 7 pm Rawlinson put Gough in command of X and VIII Corps (the northern sector of the Somme front), (Note: This brought the 36th (Ulster) Division under Gough's command, joined by the 16th (Irish) Division later in July.) with orders to "push them on again". Taking command on 2 July, Gough reported that VIII Corps communication trenches were blocked with dead and wounded troops and X Corps was found to be little better. In the early hours of 3 July, Rawlinson ordered Gough to renew the attack, orders which Haig then countermanded.

Gough was ordered to attack towards Schwaben Redoubt to rescue British survivors of 1 July. Despite Haig and Rawlinson's preference for minor attacks, they allowed Gough to attack a salient south-east of Thiepval, with six battalions. Sheffield wrote that the attack was "a complete shambles", but Gough was not entirely to blame and that it typified the "chaos" of British operations at that stage. Gough later claimed to have regretted the attack. In the afternoon of 3 July, Reserve Army was formally made independent of Fourth Army.

Over the following months most of the shells and heavy artillery would be supporting Rawlinson's efforts, and although Gough was given extra guns later, he never had as many as Fourth Army. Haig's orders were to "sap" with small penetrations to open up he German lines to flanking attacks. Kiggell (BEF Chief of Staff) wrote Gough a memo (4 July) that his role was to assist Rawlinson by pinning down German reserves and that he was to keep within his allotted quantity of shells. In July Gough believed that frequent small narrow-front attacks would keep the Germans "off balance" with low British casualties, but they allowed the Germans to concentrate their fire, contributing to the massive British losses of that month.

Gough was promoted to temporary general on 7 July 1916, aged just 45. The Reserve Army took Ovillers on 16 July.

==== Summer ====
===== Pozières =====
The slaughter of 1 July had shown that the German positions on VIII Corps sector and much of X Corps sector were too strong to attack frontally. Until early September Gough attacked with two divisions of X Corps, later assisted by the newly arrived II Corps to assist Rawlinson's left flank, but on only two occasions before 3 September, were efforts coordinated with Fourth Army and one of those (22/23 July) by accident.

On 15 July, the day after Fourth Army's success at the Battle of Bazentin Ridge, Haig envisaged Gough exploiting up the Ancre valley, to attack the enemy on Third Army's front (to Gough's north) from the south. The Pozières sector was handed over from Rawlinson to Gough on 15 July, making the Albert–Bapaume Road the boundary between the two armies. (Note: With the initial Allied attacks being more successful in Rawlinson's sector and the French sector, the Allied forces on the Somme were advancing into a salient. The extension of Reserve Army front left it occupying an approximate L-shape and opened up the possibility of Gough outflanking Thiepval from the south.) When Fourth Army's attacks again ran out of steam, Haig ordered Gough (18 July) to prepare for "methodical operations against Pozières ... with as little delay as possible", to capture the summit of Thiepval Ridge. Haig sent some fresh divisions to X Corps and also deployed I ANZAC Corps, newly arrived on the Western Front, opposite Pozières. This was the most important attack yet expected of Gough.

On 18 July Maj-Gen Harold "Hooky" Walker, the British officer commanding 1st Australian Division, was ordered to attack Pozières the following night. Walker recorded his horror in his diary. I ANZAC Corps HQ had not yet arrived on the Somme and Walker and his chief of staff Brudenell White argued until Gough gave in. Walker later wrote that he had to demand extra artillery, and only obtained permission to attack from the south east rather than the south west (the direction of previous unsuccessful attacks) as Gough wanted after taking Edward "Moses" Beddington, a staff officer whom Gough trusted, with him to reconnoitre the position. Gough defended the ANZACs to Haig against "tittle-tattle" at GHQ by officers who had "no idea of the real worth of the Australians". Gough later claimed (letter to Edmonds in 1939) he had given Walker no choice but had himself ordered the change in the direction of the attack.

The attack was delayed until 12:30 am on the night of 22/23 July and Pozières was taken, partly as a result of planning and partly as tired German troops were being relieved by fresh troops. The fall of Pozières on 22/23 July was the most successful part of a Big Push involving eight divisions, spread across five corps, from Pozières on the left to Guillemont on Rawlinson's right.

===== Clashes with subordinates =====
Gough used his corps as "postboxes", whereas Rawlinson was more tolerant of debate and discussion. Gough was reluctant to allow corps their normal role of control of artillery (which he centralised at Army level under Brigadier-General Tancred) and in planning operations. Neill Malcolm (Chief of Staff Reserve Army) recorded several instances in his diary (6 July, 13 July, 18 July) of corps commanders chafing at his "interference". Aylmer Hunter-Weston (GOC VIII Corps) wrote to his wife (3 August) that his staff were glad to be moving to the Second Army at Ypres, that Reserve Army staff had not run smoothly and that although he liked Gough and thought him "a good soldier ... he is hardly a big minded enough man to make a really good Army Commander".

Gough also clashed badly with Philip Howell, Chief of Staff of II Corps, who thought Gough "very loveable in many ways", if perhaps not quite sane, and "really quite a child & can be managed like one if treated as such & humoured". By late July and throughout August 1916 Howell complained repeatedly about Army-level micromanagement, with Reserve Army allegedly even taking direct control of four of 12th Division machine guns during an attack on 2 August. Howell claimed (29 August 1916) that Claud Jacob (II Corps), Edward Perceval (49th Division) and even Malcolm (!) were terrified of Gough. Gough thought Howell a "great thorn" who spent much time "trying to argue", avoiding fighting and disobeying orders. Howell was killed by shellfire in September.

Gough also clashed with Lord Cavan (XIV Corps) (3 August). Gough's attempts to micro-manage had little effect on the strong-minded Cavan.

===== Mouquet Farm =====
Gough ordered further attacks to seize the German OG1 and OG2 trenches north of Pozières, and to take Mouquet Farm (which lies approximately between Pozières and Thiepval). The first attack, by tired troops in the dark, failed. 1st Australian Division were withdrawn on 25 July and replaced by 2nd Australian Division. Gary Sheffield & Daniel Todman argue that Gough's "direct operational control" of 2nd Australian Division on 29 July contributed to the failure of that attack, as Gough pressured Maj-Gen James Gordon Legge to attack before preparations were complete. The German positions were on a reverse slope, so wire and machine gun positions could not be destroyed by bombardment. Charles Bean blamed Legge for not standing up to Gough, and wrote that Brudenell White blamed himself for not doing so, although Sheffield argues that this is not entirely fair, as Legge, a "colonial", should have had more support from Corps level.

By the end of July it was clear that the Germans were not about to crumble as Haig had hoped, and on 2 August he ordered Reserve Army to conduct methodical attacks in the area from Pozières to Mouquet Farm and Ovillers, as economically with men and munitions as possible, so as to draw in German reserves and thus assist with Rawlinson's attacks on Gough's right flank. Haig recorded (diary 3 August) that Gough had demanded "reasons in writing" from Legge, after the failure of the Australian attack. Gough had written to William Birdwood (1 ANZAC Corps Commander) demanding an explanation and asking if the attack would have succeeded given "greater energy and foresight on the part of the higher commanders". Birdwood refused to pass this note on to Legge as he thought it was "essential to give (him) a fair trial". Legge's second attack on Mouquet Farm, was better planned and succeeded on 4 August.

Gough now planned to capture Thiepval by converging attacks by the ANZACs from the east and by II Corps to the south west. This meant that the ANZACs had to attack along the crest of Thiepval Ridge, facing German fire from west, north and east. These attacks were often small in scale and were often not coordinated with II Corps attacks, let alone with Fourth Army, allowing the Germans – who knew the BEF plan from captured documents – a chance to concentrate their fire on the attackers.

Gough almost pushed Maj-Gen Robert Fanshawe (48th Division) (25 August) to the point of resignation. Gough complained to Haig (Haig diary 29 August) that "the Commanders of the Australians are becoming less offensive in spirit! The men are all right...." In over a month of fighting II Corps and I ANZAC Corps advanced 0.5-mile (0.8 km) towards Mouquet Farm and Thiepval. The BEF (not just ANZACs but also the 12th, 25th, 48th divisions and the Canadian Corps) suffered approximately 20,000 casualties in these attacks from 7 August to 12 September. The ANZACs had suffered 23,000 casualties in six weeks, a similar loss to what they had endured in eight months at Gallipoli.

Prior & Wilson criticised Gough for his responsibility for what they called "the Mouquet Farm fiasco", not least because at some point in September (documentary evidence of the exact date has not been found) Gough had changed his mind and decided to attack Thiepval solely from the front, rather than trying to outflank it via Mouquet Farm. Philpott believes that although Haig's instructions were "confusing and contradictory", Gough (and Rawlinson) share some responsibility for the costly nature of these small piecemeal attacks, whose supposed aim was to "wear down" the Germans, prior to the decisive breakthrough which Haig was hoping to achieve in September. In August, clearly still hopeful that decisive victory could be attained on the Somme, Gough wrote to one of his nephews: "We are breaking in bit by bit and we must not stop until we have made the gap. It would be terrible to ask our men to begin their attacks all over again on fresh defences next year."

==== Autumn ====
===== Initial attack on Thiepval =====
A conference was held on 23 August to plan the attack on Thiepval, and the V Corps Chief of Staff (Brig-Gen Gerald Boyd) later brushed aside the GOC 6th Division's objections that an afternoon attack was unwise. The next day detailed plans for each division's attack were issued not at corps level but by Reserve Army.

3 September saw an attack by four divisions of Reserve Army from Pozières to the Ancre valley, simultaneously with an attack by Fourth Army. V Corps, extending Reserve Army operations into the Ancre valley for the first time, attacked towards St Pierre Divion and Schwaben Redoubt (north of Thiepval) to attack Thiepval from the north. II Corps (48th and 25th Divisions, moved up in mid-August) attacked Thiepval. These attacks failed. 4th Australian Division gained part of Fabeck Graben Redoubt north of Mouquet Farm, which was then lost by the Canadian Corps when it relieved 1 ANZAC Corps in the line.

The attack by 39th and 49th divisions (part of II Corps) failed, with some battalions taking between 30% and 50% casualties. Gough attributed the failure to lack of "martial qualities", lack of "discipline and motivation", "ignorance on the part of the Commanding officers" and "poor spirit in the men", to which Claud Jacob, GOC II Corps, added "want of direction", "stage fright", and cowardice on the part of the brigadier, while also commenting adversely on the lack of casualties among the C.O.s. V Corps, at Reserve Army's insistence, sent a detailed critique of the operation to 39th Division. However, Gough took responsibility for not having cancelled the operation when it was clear surprise had been lost. He had lost an ADC wounded next to him as he observed attacks, his third during the war.

===== Assisting Rawlinson's offensive =====
Gough had submitted (28 August) an ambitious plan for the capture of Courcelette on his right flank. This was rejected by Launcelot Kiggell, who told him that he was to continue to conduct limited operations to assist Rawlinson with the Battle of Flers–Courcelette the next Fourth Army attack, which, if successful, would enable Rawlinson to attack Thiepval (on Gough's front) from the rear. In the event Haig changed his mind at the last moment.

Two days before Flers–Courcelette, Haig (13 September) – over Rawlinson's objections (Rawlinson diary 14 September) – ordered an attack on Martinpuich (Rawlinson's left flank) and an attack by 2nd and 3rd Canadian divisions on Courcelette (Gough's right flank) with a view to opening a gap which could be exploited by cavalry. Haig also urged Gough and Rawlinson (separately) not to neglect any opportunity to put the cavalry through, the ultimate aim being to take the Germans facing the Third and even First armies (to Gough's north) from the rear. II and V Corps were also to make feint attacks at Thiepval. The Canadian assault on Courcelette was a great success. Gough wrote (to his brother Johnnie's widow Dorothea, 23 September 1916) that many corps and division commanders were "incompetent" and that "considerable exercise of firmness" was needed to get them to obey orders.

===== Thiepval Ridge =====
After Flers-Courcelette (15 September), Haig, perhaps believing a decisive breakthrough to be imminent, initially envisaged Gough attacking Thiepval, together with further attacks by Fourth Army and by the French further south – an attack by ten divisions.

Gough's plan was for 18th Division to capture Thiepval and Schwaben Redoubt, 11th Division to capture Mouquet Farm and Zollern and Stuff Redoubts (roughly north of Mouquet Farm) while on the right 1st and 2nd Canadian divisions were to attack from Courcelette to Regina Trench which lay just beyond the ridge line. Gough allocated all seven of his tanks (five of which broke down before reaching the lines) to the Canadians.

The preliminary bombardment began on 23 September. This was the heaviest barrage yet fired by Reserve Army, assisted by an indirect machine gun barrage into the German rear areas. Gough had 570 field guns and 270 howitzers to attack along a 6,000-yard (5,500 m) front (roughly twice the concentration of 1 July, but only half that of the Battle of Bazentin Ridge on 14 July and much the same as that of the Battle of Flers–Courcelette on 15 September.

Allenby's Third Army was to co-operate with an attack on Gough's left flank (Haig diary 24 September 30 September).

In the event poor weather delayed the attacks until the early afternoon of 25 September. As Gough planned to use a few tanks to assist his attack, Haig ordered him to delay until the following morning when they could be concealed in the morning mist but in the event further delays, for which the reason is unclear, meant that Gough attacked at 12:35 pm on 26 September, exactly a day after Rawlinson and Foch.

Four divisions of Canadian and II Corps attacked between Courcelette and Schwaben. The Battle of Thiepval Ridge was Gough's most ambitious operation to date. The attack of 26 September showed the improvement in British tactics. Mouquet Farm at last fell in the afternoon. On the western sector, lodgements were gained in Zollern, Stuff and Schwaben redoubts and British forces pushed to the edge of St Pierre Divion. Thiepval was surrounded and captured by Ivor Maxse's highly trained 18th Division by 08.30 on 27 September. By 30 September, after fierce hand-to-hand fighting in which the British suffered 12,500 casualties, 5 square miles (13 km^{2}) had been gained, an advance of between 1,000–2,000 yards (910–1,830 m). Regina Trench and parts of Stuff and Schwaben Redoubts remained in German hands. This fighting demonstrated that, either attacking German positions with proper artillery support, or in hand-to-hand fighting in which artillery support mattered little, British volunteer infantry could fight as well as the Germans. The same would prove true in November. Gough's capture of Thiepval (an original objective for 1 July) preserved his status with Commander-in-Chief.

===== Tactical ideas =====
A 5 October 1916 memo (over Neill Malcolm's signature) for the guidance of division and brigade commanders (bypassing corps), sheds light on Gough's tactical thinking. Although he understood the importance of the creeping barrage and of mopping-up parties, he was – unlike Rawlinson – uninterested in bite and hold tactics and tended to feel that opportunities would be lost if infantry were obliged to stop at a predetermined point to stick to an artillery plan.

He recommended aiming for deep advances into enemy positions, with troops attacking up to five consecutive preassigned objectives, with waves aiming for predetermined objectives in a conveyor-belt approach. Each brigade was to attack in up to eight "waves": two battalions, making up the first four waves, were to take the first objective and another two battalions, perhaps deployed in columns for speed of movement, would then take the second, with no battalions held in brigade-level reserve (the argument being that orders would never reach them in time). He recommended that each division attack with two brigades and hold a third brigade in reserve, ready to take the third objective, by which time the first two brigades would have been reorganised to take the fourth objective. The fifth objective would require fresh troops.

He wanted commanders to keep as far forward as possible, even if it was not possible to keep in contact with their superiors by telephone, in order not to have to waste time sending junior officers forward to reconnoitre and report back. The brigade commander was to stay forward so that while the second objective was being assaulted they could reorganise the troops who had just taken the first objective, so that they could take the third. Divisional commanders were also urged to stay forward so that they could reorganise the attacking brigades so as to create their own reserve. Simpson comments that corps would have the benefit of Royal Flying Corps (RFC) patrols to keep in touch, but their own reserves would be too far back to be of use, while heavy artillery controlled at corps level would be more important for counterbattery work and for the preliminary bombardment, rather than being needed during the infantry assault. Simpson also comments that all this was very similar to VIII Corps views prior to 1 July attacks, and that Reserve Army's attacks in October were to be little more successful, although weather and mud made Gough's task more difficult. Although it is true that opportunities for advance sometimes went begging for lack of initiative (e.g. at Bazentin Ridge on 14 July 1916), Sheffield argues that Gough was overly focussed on infantry rather than artillery tactics, and was demanding too much from his men.

Gough agreed with Haig's suggestion (Haig diary 8 October) that "the deterioration of the Enemy's fighting qualities" meant that it was not necessary for British troops to be protected by a barrage once they had captured an enemy position, as this would hamper reserves from pushing on to the next objective. General Tom Bridges later wrote (in "Alarms and Excursions") that "With the true cavalry spirit, (Gough) was always for pushing on". Rawlinson (diary 9 October) recorded his concerns at Gough's "hourush tactics and no reserves, as they are not sound".

The fighting at Thiepval went on until November and was later criticised by the Official Historian for lack of co-ordination and excessive reliance on infantry elan.

===== Battle of the Ancre Heights =====
The Battle of the Ancre Heights (1 October – 11 November) was conducted further to the left of Gough's sector. Haig issued orders (29 September) for further advances by Reserve and Fourth Armies. Gough was to attack Loupart Wood from the south and Beaumont-Hamel from the west. The plan was for Reserve Army to advance 5 miles (8.0 km) and capture more ground in one battle than in three months of campaigning. (Note: Although this was less ambitious than the plans before 15 September, Haig was still considering ambitious breakthrough plans (30 September) for Charles Kavanagh's Cavalry Corps to exploit up the Ancre Valley, as part of a plan for a major BEF advance of 20–40 miles (32–64 km), by Rawlinson towards Cambrai and by Allenby's Third Army from Arras towards the Canal du Nord, with a view to encircling large numbers of Germans. Gough's exact role, commanding the central army in this hypothetical pincer movement, was not specified.)

On 8 October, the 1st and 3rd Canadian divisions, on Gough's right flank, assisted another of Rawlinson's offensives by attacking unsuccessfully towards Le Sars and Regina Trench, only to be held up by German wire. Speaking to Haig that afternoon, Gough blamed the 3rd Canadian Division, claiming that in some cases they had not even left their trenches. Stuff Redoubt fell (9 October) to a battalion of 25th Division. Schwaben Redoubt was attacked unsuccessfully (9 October) in a surprise night attack with no barrage, then successfully on 14 October after a two-day bombardment. These costly penny-packet attacks sometimes involved little more than a single battalion. A big German counterattack was then repulsed. By this time Gough was discussing with Haig the possibility that the war might go on into 1917, requiring fresh offensives.

After two weeks of rain had rendered plans for exploitation unrealistic, Gough issued a new, more cautious plan (15 October), in which 45 tanks were to be used, although he was still under pressure from Haig to exploit to the north and north-east. Stuff and Regina Trenches (which ran approximately west–east north of a line from Thiepval to Courcelette) were then captured in a major attack by 35th, 25th, 18th and 4th Canadian divisions, completing the capture of the Ancre Heights. The battle testified to the revived German defence after their panic of September.

Wilson, whom Gough had disliked since the Curragh incident, commanded IV Corps first alongside then under Gough in 1916. (Note: It was used as a holding formation for reserve divisions, not placed in the line.) Wilson commented in his diary (21 October) on reports of Gough micro-managing divisions and even brigades. That autumn Edward Loch, 2nd Baron Loch told Wilson "Goughie is the best hated & most useless & most dangerous General we have got".

After the success of 21 October, Gough once again presented more ambitious plans, with Haig offering (24 October) to place an extra two cavalry divisions (for three in total) at his disposal – this at a time when even quite minor infantry attacks on Fourth Army sector were having to be cancelled because of mud. Haig cautioned Gough to wait for three days of fine weather (26 October) before attacking again. Gough complained that Brigadier-General Percy Radcliffe (chief of staff, Canadian Corps) "made unnecessary difficulties" (Haig Diary 30 October 1916).

Reserve Army was redesignated Fifth Army on 30 October 1916.

==== The Ancre ====
===== Political considerations =====
Gough fought the last major British attack on the Somme at the Ancre, beginning on 13 November. This was "perhaps Gough's finest hour as an offensive general", although a large part of its success was owed to delays because of the weather, which gave more time for planning and preparation and which forced the original plans (drawn up by GHQ in October) to be scaled back. Haig urged Gough (2 and 6 November) to wait for dry weather before proceeding. After continuous rain between 24 October and 3 November, Fifth Army was ordered (5 November) to conduct only a "limited" attack and authorised to wait until the weather was good enough.

Haig sent Launcelot Kiggell (Chief of Staff BEF) to Gough's HQ (8 November) to explain the motivation for the attack, although Kiggell stressed that Haig did not want the attack to proceed unless there were good prospects of success. (Note: Haig's order of 8 November stated that "A success by 15th would be very valuable as an argument at Conference against transfer of troops to Salonika". Travers gives this document (WO 158/236) as orders to Fourth Army, which appears to be an error.) The aim was to pin down German troops which might otherwise have been sent to Romania, to impress on the Russians that the BEF was still fighting, as well as strengthening Haig's hand in the inter-Allied conference due to start at Chantilly on 15 November, at which the possible transfer of Western Allied troops to Salonika was to be discussed. Gough later recorded that the first murmurings against Haig's leadership were beginning to be heard in London. Peter Simkins suggests that Haig wanted to be able to blame Gough if the Ancre attack went wrong but take the credit if it succeeded. (Note: Prior & Wilson (2006, pp. 293–294) comment on the "unprecedented" way in which political considerations were discussed between GHQ and Army and argue that Haig was "desperate" for a success to report; Sheffield's view is that Haig thought a success would be "nice to have". Haig was also under pressure from the French: following the cancellation (5 November) of plans by Fourth Army to attack, after strong protests by Rudolph Lambart, 10th Earl of Cavan (GOC XIV Corps), Haig had had to promise Ferdinand Foch (commander, French Army Group North, and tasked by Joffre with coordinating the Somme Offensive) that a major offensive would take place astride the Ancre on 15 November, if necessary in a series of attacks if the ground was wet.)

Gough then consulted his corps commanders (10 November): Claud Jacob (II Corps) was persuaded to try for deeper objectives as Edward Fanshawe (V Corps) and Walter Congreve (XIII Corps) wanted. The attack was agreed for 13 November. Staff officers and patrols inspected the ground and Gough (10–11 November) visited six divisional commanders and ten brigadiers, also seeing two battalion commanders at each brigade headquarters. He had asked his corps commanders to make similar inquiries. He found no consensus as to whether or not the ground was dry enough. The start time was set for 5:45 am after further consultations with Jacob, Fanshawe and divisional commanders.

Kiggell again visited Gough on 12 November – Gough later wrote (in The Fifth Army) of how any further delay would have had a bad effect on troop morale, and how after four dry days the prospects were as good as they were likely to be that winter, and of how he had sat looking out of the window turning over the decision in his mind after Kiggell had "gravely elaborated the great issues at stake" – that afternoon Haig also visited him and gave him the go-ahead (writing in his diary "a success at this time was much wanted" and "I am ready to run reasonable risks ... [but given] the difficulties of ground and weather. Nothing is as costly as failure!")

Sheffield comments that this sequence of events indicates that Haig enjoyed warmer relations with Gough than with, say, Rawlinson, but also suggests that he felt the need to supervise him closely. He also comments that although Gough consulted his subordinates, it is unclear that he took their advice: Simon Robbins quotes evidence of warnings from some corps, division and brigade staffs that troops were exhausted and conditions too poor to attack. (Note: W. B. Wood, one of the Official History writing team, later wrote (in 1944) that "I first began to be suspicious of (Gough) when I found that he had forced Jacob (II Corps) to attack at Grandcourt in November 1916 against the latter's better judgement and more accurate information, thereby sharing a tendency to overrule the man on the spot and force him to submit to his own congenital optimism".) Neill Malcolm's Memorandum on Operations (13 November 1916) recorded the political reasons for the attack.

===== Initial success =====
The Ancre attack employed 282 heavy guns and a creeping barrage, over an area which had not been heavily fought over so far, thus allowing men and guns to be moved more easily over relatively undisturbed ground. The volume of shells exceeded that put on the entire enemy line on 1 July. After a seven-day preliminary bombardment, 13 November saw an attack by 5 divisions, with 2 brigades on the flanks, the largest British attack since September. Lessons were also learned from previous battles: a mine was blown at Beaumont-Hamel, simultaneously with the commencement of the artillery barrage, far more successfully than the mine which had been blown in the same area 10 minutes prior to the infantry assault on 1 July.

The attack began at 5:45 am, behind an effective creeping barrage, with the German machine guns on the crest behind Beaumont-Hamel completely suppressed by 40 guns specifically given this task. The attack succeeded in the southern sector, where the 63rd Royal Naval Division took Beaucourt by 10:45 am, albeit with some attacking battalions taking 40–50% casualties, and the 51st Highland Division took Beaumont-Hamel and St Pierre Divion, where the French practice was adopted of assigning a 4.5 inch howitzer to shell the entrance of each German dugout until the "mopping-up" platoons had reached them. However, further north in V Corps sector the attack on Serre was less successful because of mud and uncut wire, despite Gough visiting the sector at 2 pm to order further attacks. Those who fought at Beaumont Hamel thought it had been well-planned. Haig wrote in his diary (13 November) "the success has come at a most opportune moment".

Gough ordered further attacks the next day (14 November), leading to the vicious local struggles for Munich and Frankfort Trenches. When he learned of this, Haig telephoned from Paris that he did not want any further attacks "on a large scale" until his return from the conference, but this news did not reach Gough until 9 am on 15 November, when the attack was about to begin, and after consulting his corps commanders Gough decided to proceed, a decision which Haig approved retrospectively that afternoon. Sheffield writes that these attacks "bore a distinct resemblance to the narrow-fronted, penny-packet attacks around Pozières and elsewhere in the summer, with the added complication of appalling weather."

Brigadier-General Archibald Fraser Home of the Cavalry Corps noted (15 November) that the rumours that Gough was to be promoted to Commander-in-Chief in Haig's place were "too comic as I don't think they could ever make him do what they wanted".

===== Final stages =====
After the first attempt to take Munich and Frankfort trenches (15 November) failed, the commanders of 2nd and 51st Divisions were asked for detailed reports. Maj-Gen George Harper (GOC 51st Division) blamed the slowness of the creeping barrage, which caused his "impetuous" men to suffer casualties from friendly fire, and the fact that the attack had not been "under one command". Maj-Gen William George Walker (GOC 2nd Division) commented that the attack had been too hurried, as his troops had not been familiar with the ground, and that Fanshawe (GOC V Corps) had rejected his requests for a delay and for a daylight attack. Gough forced 2nd Division to attack for two consecutive days despite protests from its commander (Walker) and chief of staff that the ground was impassable.

Malcolm issued a confidential memo to Corps Commanders (16 November) complaining about their tendency to query and argue about orders. Another Memorandum on Future Operations (16 November) discusses Fanshawe's wish to attack because of "a serious break on his front". Fanshawe held a conference of division commanders (16 November) to discuss the troop and barrage requirements for a renewed attempt.

George Jeffreys later testified that the GOC of 19th Division had complained of the difficulties of attacking at Grandcourt and Gough and his staff "had simply no conception of conditions in the forward area". Gough later demanded to know why that division had not left 58th Brigade in the line for a further 24 hours, which "show(ed) ... that he had no notion of the physical strain on the troops of even a few hours in the line under such conditions".

The first snow of the winter fell on 18 November. The attacks on 18 November suffered around 10,000 casualties. One officer of II Corps later wrote to Edmonds (in 1936) that it had been a "cruel useless sacrifice of life" with men dead from exhaustion in trying to crawl out of the mud, and that given the weather it was obvious "to the very stupidest brain that no success could possibly result". Haig called off the battle. Kiggell later wrote to Edmonds (in 1938) "the later stages of the fight were hardly justified, but Gough was so keen and confident the C-in-C decided to permit them".

A few days later 32nd Division relieved 2nd Division in the line, and their attack would also fail, partly as a result of inaccurate bombardment as 2nd Division staff had not been able to give them an accurate description of where the front line actually was. Gough exercised almost personal control of 32nd Division in fighting for Frankfort Trench from 18 November onwards. The GOC, William Rycroft, was apprehensive of Gough because of the failure of 3 July and was said by his GSO1 (chief of staff), the future Maj-Gen Wace, to be "terrified of Gough" and on learning in October 1916 that his division was returning to the Somme had remarked "wryly that it would be his undoing unless we went to Rawly's Army", however "lack(ed) the kick in him to stand up to Gough, when all initiative was taken out of his hands". Wace later testified to Edmonds (in 1936) that during the planning for the Ancre orders came down, via Corps, as being very clearly the Army Commander's decision. Rycroft only received the orders at 9:45 pm the night before and called it "another of Gough's mad ideas", and was simply told what orders he was to issue, even for the location of Advanced Brigade Headquarters. After the attack failed Gough sacked up to seven senior officers of 32nd Division, including Rycroft and two brigadiers, one of whom was H.F Jenkins, GOC 75th Brigade.

Gough rebuked Fanshawe in writing (21 November) for lack of grip, and for failing to issue detailed written artillery orders, during 15 November attack. On his copy of the report, against the comment that copies of Gough's remarks were to be sent to the two divisional commanders, Fanshawe wrote "I hope not all of them" and protested in the margin that he had been in telephone contact with divisions throughout. Simpson criticises Gough for his "poor reasoning and indifference to the views of the men on the spot", although he is also critical of Fanshawe for attempting to blame his own subordinates. Sheffield writes "Some of Gough's points were fair, if harshly expressed, but others were not; some were based on factual inaccuracies. All this suggests a commander who had an incomplete grasp of the realities of the battle." He also remarks on Gough's deliberate humiliation of Fanshawe in front of the latter's subordinates. Walker was relieved of command of 2nd Division on 27 December.

Gough was awarded the Knight Companion of the Order of the Bath in 1916.

==== Gough and the BEF's "learning curve" ====
Gough practised top-down command to a degree which was unusual in the British Army of that era, with its culture, evolved in an army designed for fighting small colonial wars, of leaving decisions to "the man on the spot". Andy Simpson argues that although Gough's command methods were clearly more prescriptive than those of Rawlinson's Fourth Army, in which a 20-page summary of division commanders' views was circulated in late August, given Rawlinson's lack of grip this was not necessarily a bad thing. Simpson argues that Gough's hands-on control may have been at Haig's urging, given Haig's dissatisfaction with Rawlinson, and suggests that this may also have been a factor in Gough being employed in major offensives in 1917, whereas Rawlinson was not. Michael Howard cited Gough's love of micro-managing divisions as evidence that he had been overpromoted, and Gary Sheffield concedes that Gough's reputation for touring the trenches to spot dirty rifles suggests that he had found it hard to adapt to his greater responsibilities.

Sheffield argues that Gough's behaviour was to some extent an attempt to answer the dilemma noted by Malcolm (diary 29 June 1916). Malcolm believed that a "happy medium" had been attained between Army maintaining control of operations and delegating decision-making to the "man on the spot" as prescribed by Field Service Regulations. Sheffield describes that claim as "misplaced". The BEF had recently grown from 7 divisions to 70 – the Army had not anticipated or trained for the challenges of officers having to command large formations, nor for trench warfare, nor for the difficulties in communication (which would remain until battlefield radios came into use) involved. Officers' personalities, and how they related with one another, mattered a great deal in how they managed these changes. Part of Gough's concern at micromanaging plans may have been because he knew that once an attack had begun he would have little chance to influence the results.

Sheffield observes that Haig was himself grappling with the dilemma of the degree to which subordinates should be "gripped", and so often gave Gough unclear guidance. Gough himself also had a tendency to ignore orders from above when it suited him, the very tendency he abhorred in his own subordinates.

Some of Gough's ideas were adopted in other armies: Fourth Army's document Artillery Lessons of the Battle of the Somme (18 November) reflected Gough's prescriptive approach rather than the delegation encouraged under Field Service Regulations, or practised by Rawlinson during the Somme. On the other hand, the tactical manual SS144 The Normal Formation for the Attack (February 1917) was a compromise between Gough's view and the opposite view, that each infantry wave should take and consolidate just one objective, with fresh units being fed through to take deeper objectives.

=== Spring 1917 ===
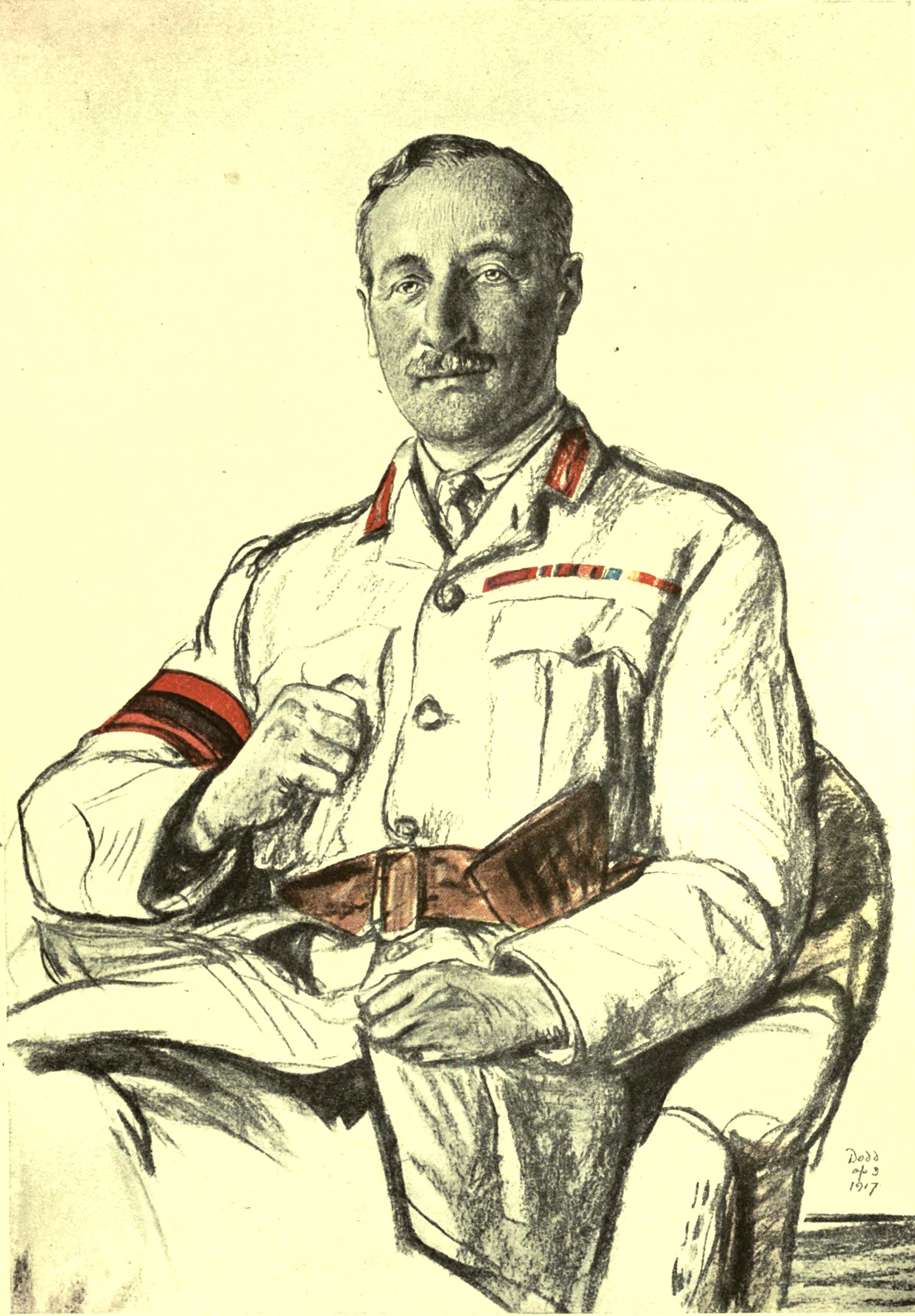
Half length portrait of Gough, 1917

==== Advance on the Ancre ====
On 1 January 1917, Gough was promoted to permanent lieutenant general, while continuing to hold the temporary rank of full general. He was awarded the GCVO in 1917.

Early in 1917 Gough conducted minor operations aimed at "improving our position & hustling the Bosche" (letter to the King's adviser Clive Wigram, 7 January). Birdwood, then commanding I ANZAC Corps, which had briefly been part of Fourth Army, was "very sick" (Rawlinson diary 26 January) at the prospect of having to serve under Gough again. Limited operations were conducted between 10 January and 13 February (at which point there was a cold snap), to seize points of high ground off the enemy. In mid February, having heard reports that the German trenches opposite were thinly held, Gough ordered his divisional commanders to prepare for a general advance. Reconnaissance was hampered by German air superiority. Beginning on the night of 23/4 February the Germans conducted a limited withdrawal on the Ancre Heights which allowed operations to be stepped up by 63rd, 18th and 2nd Divisions, and by 1 ANZAC Corps. Fifth Army occupied Miraumont, Serre and Pys. Brigadier-General Hanway Cumming later (in 1922) recalled Gough's visit to the headquarters of 91st Brigade in February 1917. Gough's demands for an immediate advance were impractical owing to the state of the ground and the exhaustion of his troops, and only Gough's departure had allowed his staff to get on with preparing the next day's operations.

When his enemy Wilson was appointed (March 1917) to head Anglo-French liaison at French GQG, Gough wrote to Lord Stamfordham (i.e. for the King to see) complaining of how Wilson had made little impact either as a staff officer in 1914 or in 1916 as a corps commander, but had a great reputation throughout the army for intrigue and for "talk".

With relations between the French Commander-in-Chief Robert Nivelle and the British generals becoming particularly strained, Nivelle asked the British government (7 March 1917) that Haig be sacked and replaced by Gough. Haig openly confronted Gough about the rumours (which Lord Esher had recorded in his diary on 9 March). Gough, to his own ultimate detriment (and unlike Haig) made little effort to cultivate the press. Gough's own view of the Calais Scheme to place the BEF under Nivelle's command was that it would leave Britain a puppet of France as Serbia and Romania were of Russia, and Austria-Hungary of Germany, and correspondingly likely to be cheated at the peace conference after the war.

Fifth Army stormed the German intermediate line, which had been reached by the end of February, on 10 March.

==== Advance to the Hindenburg Line, Arras and Bullecourt ====
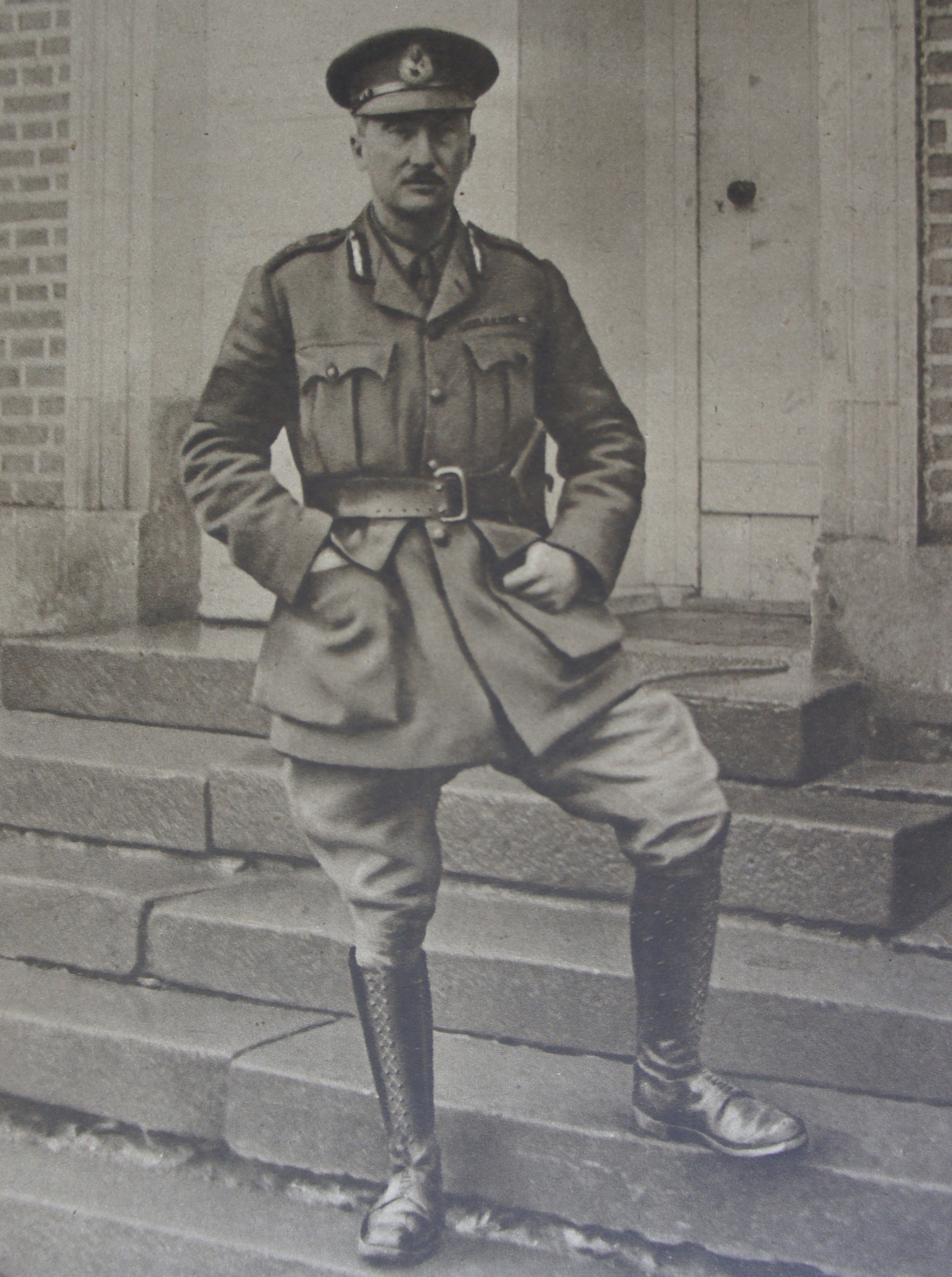
Gough in 1917

Haig had ordered Gough to prepare a major offensive, in "bites" but with "the object of breaking the enemy's front and attracting as many of his reserves as possible" to coincide with Allenby's offensive, originally due to start on or after 15 March.

On 14 March V Corps was repulsed from Bucquoy on the north of Gough's sector; Gough later claimed that he had thought the enemy defences too strong but had permitted the attack at the request of the corps commander. By now Gough had a reputation among junior officers for "heavy losses and complete failure" "very typical of Gen Gough, who apparently does not care a button about the lives of his men" (Brigadier-General Hodgkin's Diary, 14 March). He had a reputation for "terroris(ing) those under him to the extent that they are afraid to express their opinions for fear of being (sacked)" (Haldane Diary 31 March).

Allenby was annoyed at the apparent favouritism shown to Gough at Army Commanders' conferences. Gough was allowed to expand Fifth Army's role in Arras beyond what had originally been intended. Gough commanded the southern part of the offensive (Horne's First Army attacked in the north, including the famous Canadian attack on Vimy Ridge, while the main attack was conducted by Allenby's Third Army in the centre). 4th Cavalry Division was allotted to Gough's sector to exploit any breakthrough achieved.

Building on his experiences on the Aisne in September 1914, Gough formed mixed brigades of infantry, cavalry, artillery and engineers during the German withdrawal to the Hindenburg Line in mid March. 2–9 April saw costly fighting on the outskirts of the Hindenburg Line. Over the protests of the ANZAC Commanders Gough launched an attack at Bullecourt (10–11 April), described by Sheffield as "hasty, ill-prepared and ultimately disastrous" ... "the infantry plan was disrupted at a late stage by Gough's ill-fated employment of tanks". 4th Australian Brigade lost three-quarters of their men in action, 12th Australian Brigade half of each battalion engaged. Simkins writes that "(Haig) yet again indulged Gough's tendency to launch precipitate and ill-considered attacks", while Prior & Wilson describe the attack as "singularly barren". Bullecourt became known as the "Blood Tub".

Gough was ordered (Haig diary 14 April) to prepare to "pierce" the Hindenburg Line "astride the Bapaume–Cambrai Road" if Allenby's main attack made sufficient progress. Gough attended an Army commanders' conference on 16 April. With the Arras offensive bogging down, he later declined to conduct further infantry attacks as part of the 23 April push, restricting his efforts to artillery only.

At the Army Commanders' Conference on 30 April 1917 Haig, who had just been told that Nivelle was to be sacked, still expected Italian and (contrary to the War Office view) Russian offensives to take place that year. He told the Army commanders that he was not entirely clear what the BEF would be doing for the rest of the year but that he wanted to "shift the centre of gravity up to the Second Army". In the afternoon after the conference he told Gough that he was to command the proposed Flanders Offensive, and ordered him to speak to Colonel Norman MacMullen (who had presented plans, later abandoned, for a tank-led assault at Ypres) and visit the workshop at Érin, where tanks were being prepared for Operation Hush, a proposed amphibious landing on the Belgian Coast.

The Second Battle of Bullecourt (3–15 May) was "memorably bloody and ill-rewarded". Sanders Marble writes: "The results could largely have been predicted before so many lives were lost. Hasty attacks failed with heavy losses. Once adequate time was allowed for preparations the village was finally wrested from the Germans ... it was not the BEF's finest hour" Bullecourt "did not win many plaudits" and further worsened Gough's reputation in the eyes of the Australians.

=== Third Ypres ===
==== Planning the offensive ====
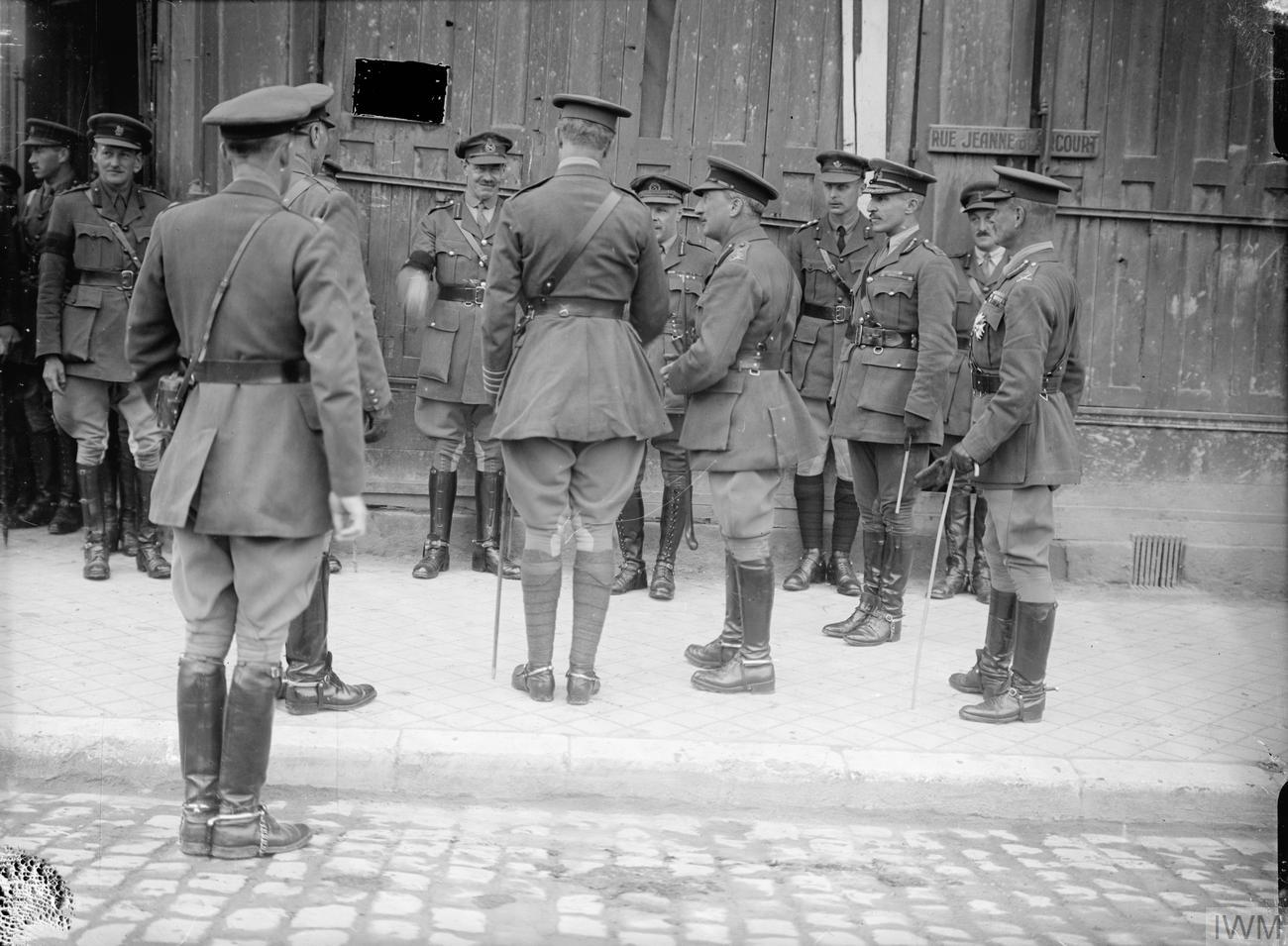
Gough presenting officers to Albert I of Belgium, at Albert, 16 May 1917. Lieutenant-General William Birdwood, GOC I ANZAC Corps, on the right

While Gough was fighting at Bullecourt, Haig unveiled the timetable for Third Ypres at an Army Commanders' conference at Doullens (17 May). Haig may well have chosen Gough to spearhead Third Ypres because his aggression and preference to attack "at the hurroush" contrasted with the more cautious tactics favoured by Rawlinson and Plumer, and perhaps also because his inexperience and lack of knowledge of the Ypres Salient made him more willing to do Haig's bidding. (Note: In January 1917, Plumer had been asked to prepare plans to "attack with rapidity and push through quickly". Rawlinson was Haig's next choice to command Third Ypres, but Haig wrote in the margin of his proposals "our objective is to break through rapidly". Rawlinson's and Plumer's plans had been for a penetration of 1,500–1,750 yards (1,370–1,600 m), (up to about a mile) followed by a two-day consolidation to allow the capture of the Gheluveld Plateau. By April Haig was urging that Passchendaele Ridge, formerly a third day objective, could be reached on the morning of the first day, followed by an advance to the Oosttaverne Line in the afternoon.)) Haig's admiring biographer John Terraine later wrote that putting Gough in charge of the early stages of Third Ypres was "Haig's greatest and most fatal error". The war correspondent Charles à Court Repington and the CIGS, General William Robertson, agreed with one another as early as 5 July 1917 that Plumer should have been chosen because of his knowledge of the Ypres Salient, and Gough himself later came to agree.

Gough later wrote highly of Maxse (XVIII Corps), Jacob (II Corps) and Congreve (XIII Corps), his corps commanders in 1917, although not of Herbert Watts (XIX Corps). However, Simon Robbins suggests that the "climate of fear" still pervaded throughout Fifth Army in 1917 and even into 1918. Gough held his first corps commanders' conference on 24 May 1917, before he had moved his HQ to the Ypres sector – the composition of divisions and corps for Third Ypres had already been chosen by this point. Simpson argues that by this time, possibly because staff officers had become more experienced at their jobs, Fifth Army's approach appears to have become "more hands-off and consultative" than in 1916, e.g. suggesting that each corps hold two divisions in the front and two in reserve. On 30 May Gough moved his HQ to Lovie Château two miles outside Poperinge, and the HQ was up and running by 2 June.

Much of the tactical discussion concerned how far the British infantry should realistically be expected to push. The immediate targets were the Black Line, just under 1-mile (1.6 km) forward, the Green Line 1.5–2 miles (2.4–3.2 km) further on and the Red Line 2.5–3 miles (4.0–4.8 km) further. (Note: The objectives were closer together on the heavily defended high ground of the Gheluveld Plateau.) Gough agreed with Maxse's proposal (31 May) for attacks just before sunset (giving troops more rest prior to the attack, and the Germans less time to counterattack) and advancing further than the Black Line to the River Steenbeck. Gough agreed that opportunities had gone to waste at Arras (9 April) as the initial attack had not been pressed hard enough. At the next corps commanders' conference (6 June) Gough declared that "should the enemy be thoroughly demoralised during the initial attack, it might be possible to gain portions of the Red Line (at that stage still a second day's objective) during the first 24 hours," although he was keen to distinguish between a bold attack against a crumbling enemy and "an organized attack against ... organized resistance". A document circulated on 7 June stressed that platoon, company and battalion commanders were to be urged to act with initiative to seize ground, in the hope of repeating the successes of 1 July 1916 (the First Day of the Somme, on the southern part of the British line), 13 November 1916 (the first day of the Ancre) or 9 April 1917 (the first day of Arras). Simpson comments that as adequate field artillery support on the first day would only extend as far as the Green Line in places, "a repulse was almost inevitable" for those units which pushed on further, and that Gough still did not appear to realise that an offensive might stall because of stronger German resistance and counter-attacks, rather than from lack of initiative among junior officers.

==== Failure to exploit Messines ====
After his victory at Messines, and in accordance with prior plans, Plumer ordered II and VIII Corps to exploit German disorganisation by attacking the Gheluveld Plateau. When their patrols encountered resistance (8 June), Haig asked Plumer to launch this attack at once, instead of waiting three days to redeploy sixty heavy and medium guns as arranged. When Plumer, after consultation with his corps commanders, declined to be rushed in this way, Haig placed II and VIII Corps under Gough's command, ordering him to prepare to seize the area around Stirling Castle. Gough, despite being given Plumer's plan (9 June), did not then make any such attack, and at the next Army Commanders' Conference (14 June) stated that he had not wanted to push his men into the small salient which such an attack would achieve, and that he wished to attack the Gheluveld Plateau simultaneously with his main attack (Gough later described this as "a slight change of plan" and also claimed that he did not want to rush into an advance because of his experience at Bullecourt). Haig approved this, and stated at the conference that he hoped to capture Passchendaele–Staden–Klerken Ridge on 25 July. The failure to seize the Gheluveld Plateau (the German Army Group Commander, Crown Prince Rupprecht, had recorded in his diary on 9 June that the area might have to be abandoned) was to have unhappy consequences.

Besides the four divisions of II and VIII Corps (VIII Corps, still under Aylmer Hunter-Weston, was soon moved out of the sector) Gough was also given another four of Plumer's divisions at the end of June, together with two from GHQ Reserve. Another six were transferred from Horne's First Army. (This makes a total of 16 divisions: Farrar-Hockley states that he also had a division in Army reserve, with another in GHQ Reserve close by). Plumer, now left with only 12 divisions, was also required to transfer half his artillery and all his tanks to Gough.

==== Final plans ====
The Germans had between five and seven (on the Gheluveld Plateau) defensive lines, and their positions had been strengthened since mid-June by Colonel Fritz von Lossberg. The fourth position, Flandern I, was 10,000–12,000 yards (9,100–11,000 m) away. Intelligence reports, filed mistakenly with the Messines operations in the Australian War Memorial, show that Fifth Army was largely aware of the digging of the German defences throughout June.

After another corps commanders' conference on 26 June, results of the discussions were published as orders. Gough planned a four-phase attack across a front of 8 miles (13 km): "a series of organised battles". First the enemy's front system (the crest of Pilckem Ridge and the edge of Shrewsbury forest on the Gheluveld Plateau) was to be taken, then the second line after a pause of 30 minutes. After a pause of four hours the third objective was to be attacked – advancing to the River Steenbeek, entering Polygon Wood and taking the German third line, in front of which lay their field (as opposed to heavy) artillery and counterattack reserves – for a planned advance of 3,000 yards (2,700 m) in total, i.e. up to the Green Line. Army was to control artillery initially, which would then be delegated to corps an hour after the third objective had been taken. There would then, "without any settled pause" and "either immediately or within a few hours" be a fourth phase: an extra 1,000–2,000 yards (910–1,830 m), taking the attackers to Passchendaele Ridge itself at Broodseinde, with the left flank along Gravenstafel spur to Gravenstafel and Langemarck (the Red Line). Although the strength of the fourth advance was to be left to the discretion of divisional commanders, Gough, in the words of the Official Historian, "instead of confining his first day's operation to a short fixed advance, was in favour of going as far as he could", and more than twice as deep than Rawlinson and Plumer had earlier recommended. All available heavy artillery was to be ready to lay a protective barrage in front of the fourth objective, where Gough expected that resistance by German reserves would be met. However, if little opposition was met, a further advance was to be made that same afternoon to Passchendaele Village itself (technically a fifth objective, although not specifically numbered as such), an objective which Gough more realistically hoped to attain on the third or fourth day. Haig did not interfere, and Gough would later tell the Official Historian that Haig had hoped to reach the Belgian coast within a matter of weeks.

Brigadier-General "Tavish" Davidson, Director of Military Operations at GHQ, now (25 June) proposed that Gough make jumps of "not less than 1,500 yards (1,400 m) and not more than 3,000 yards (2,700 m)", while also recommending jumps of only about a mile (1,760 yards (1,610 m)). This would enable greater concentration of artillery fire, while attacking troops would be less disorganised and less vulnerable to counterattack, as well as being better able to maintain their morale and to be relieved by fresh troops, ready for an advance to the Red Line three days later. Although Davidson later wrote that Haig had seen and approved his memorandum, Haig's diary makes no mention of it. Gough's response to the memorandum declared himself "in agreement" with the "broad principles" of "a continuous succession of organised attacks" but criticised Davidson's suggestion that major attack could be mounted every three days, Gough thinking ten days a more realistic interval. Gough and Maxse (who wrote "BALLS!" on his copy of Davidson's paper) agreed with one another that opportunities for further advance should be taken, and blamed the failures at Arras after 11 April, on renewed attacks without adequate artillery preparation. By Davidson's later account, at a conference on 28 June, Plumer also favoured permitting local commanders to attempt a deeper advance. Gough would later claim (in the 1940s) that he had wanted a shallower advance but had been overruled by Haig and Plumer – this appears to be at best a false recollection, if not a lie.

Simpson wrote that Gough's wish to allow infantry to push forward was "more cautious than is usually supposed". Rawlinson was not involved in these discussions and his view that Gough wanted to go forward at the "Hurroosh" may well be more a comment on his knowledge of Gough's temperament than a strictly accurate description of Gough's plans by this stage.

==== Eve of the offensive ====
Haig briefed Gough (diary 28 June) that "the main advance" should be limited until the Gheluveld Plateau had been secured as far as Broodseinde. Haig was principally concerned that Gough was not giving sufficient weight to the attack on Gheluveld Plateau. Prior & Wilson write: "It is not evident that Gough allowed these views greatly to influence the disposition of his forces". The boundary of Fifth Army was extended south, placing another of Plumer's divisions under II Corps, so that Sanctuary Wood could be assaulted, lest the Germans there subject the attackers of the Gheluveld Plateau to enfilade fire. A XIV Corps memorandum states that they had sufficient high-explosive shell but insufficient heavy guns to bombard as thoroughly as they would have liked. Prior & Wilson point out that, had Gough followed Haig's advice to concentrate more weight against the Gheluveld Plateau, that would have reduced the effectiveness of the attack on his left and centre, but also argue that more heavy guns could have been obtained from Rawlinson's forces (threatening a diversionary attack along the Belgian Coast) and Plumer's Second Army (some of which was attacking the Gheluveld Plateau, but some of which was mounting largely fruitless diversionary attacks further south).

Rawlinson urged the CIGS Robertson (29 June) of "the desirability of holding on to Goughy's coat tails and ordering him only to undertake the limited objective and not going beyond the range of his guns". He repeated this advice to Haig over dinner (3 July) although he was concerned that Haig would not insist hard enough. Aylmer Haldane recorded in his diary (30 June 1917) his lack of keenness at going to Fifth Army and wrote that Gough was "very impetuous and difficult to get on with" as well as "excitable and thoughtless and impatient". (Note: Robbins (2005, pp. 32, 33) does not give an exact cite for the latter quote although from the context it appears to be Haldane.)

Another memo by Gough (30 June) raised the possibility that open warfare might be attained after 36 hours, although "this is a result which we can hardly hope to attain until the enemy has been beaten in two or three heavy battles." Haig annotated this to insist that the capture of Passchendaele–Staden Ridge, not just the defeat of the German forces, must be the object of the offensive. Gough expressed scepticism to Robertson and King George V when they visited Fifth Army Headquarters on 3 July about Haig's "illusion" that the advance would be rapid – he said "we would be lucky to reach Roulers in two months". Like Plumer, Gough believed that Haig was being fed an exaggerated picture of German weakness by his intelligence advisor John Charteris.

In his instruction of 5 July, Haig ordered that Passchendaele–Staden Ridge was to be taken within weeks, and that thereafter a chance for the "employment of cavalry in masses is likely to occur" as they exploited towards Bruges, Roulers and Ostend. Haig hoped to reach Roulers by 7–8 August, in time for Fourth Army to catch the high tides for their coastal operations. (Note: A seaborne landing, Operation Hush, was also being planned.)

==== Pilckem Ridge ====
The bombardment began on 16 July. The battle was to have commenced on 25 July. Gough was granted three extra days for bombardment as it had taken longer than expected to get heavy artillery into place. A further delay was granted for General François Anthoine (commanding the French Army on Gough's left flank) as bad weather was hampering his counter-battery programme. Haig noted in his diary (23 July) that three of the four British corps commanders (but not Jacob of II Corps) welcomed the delay for the same reason (Charteris later described the conference as "definitely heated" and Haig as "very moody" after he had to bow to their wishes for a further delay). Fifth Army intelligence at the time recorded weather conditions as "bad" and "poor" for much of the pre-31 July period (making it difficult for aircraft to spot German batteries behind Passchendaele Ridge and the Gheluveld Plateau, or for sound-ranging to operate in the prevailing westerly wind).

Walter Guinness wrote of the slipshod staff planning, engineering and signalling arrangements of Fifth Army in 1917: "None of the lessons taught by Plumer's success seem to have been learned." He recorded in his diary (23 July 1917) that there was "little confidence" in Gough.

On 31 July the attack was relatively successful on the left (Anthoine's French, Cavan's XIV Corps (which took its objectives up to the Black Line before running into counterattacks), and to some extent Maxse's XVIII and Watts' XIX (both of which reached beyond the Green Line in places, although they did not take St Julien, and were driven back to the Black Line by counterattacks in places), but less so in Jacob's II Corps attacking the Gheluveld Plateau, where counterbattery work had not been good enough to silence German artillery). Despite initial German concerns at the success of the British attack in the left and centre, the German counterattack was conducted by Eingreif divisions which had survived further back towards Passchendaele Ridge, and artillery operating from and behind Passchendaele Ridge and the Gheluveld Plateau. British infantry training had proven relatively effective, but German artillery and the poor light and state of the ground caused a breakdown in communications, making it hard to bring up reinforcements.

Edmonds later stressed in the Official History that after four days Gough's men were less than halfway to their first day objectives and had lost 30–60% of their fighting strength. Prior & Wilson point out that the attack had captured 18 square miles, including two of the German defensive lines on the left, at a cost of 27,000 casualties and inflicted approximately equal German casualties (Note: Farrar-Hockley (pp. 220–221) gives 16,300 British casualties for Fifth Army (19,679 including the immediate prior and following days, but not including the French or Second Army) and 24,000 German casualties and 5,626 German prisoners (he does not specify whether German losses are just those inflicted by Fifth Army).) (as opposed to the First Day of the Somme, which had captured 3.5 square miles, for a cost of 57,000 British casualties, with minimal German losses). Ypres had been almost entirely removed from enemy observation. However, the attack had failed to capture the Gheluveld Plateau, and infantry pushing too far ahead had been vulnerable to counterattack. Farrar-Hockley writes that at the time "the results were not considered disappointing." John Lee writes that the results on 31 July were "mixed", with much of the ground taken lost, even on the first day, to "stupendous" counterattacks and that attempts to push forward after initial success led to "less than happy results". Andy Simpson writes of "the limited nature of the debatable success". It came on to rain on 31 July.

==== Early August ====
Gough had issued orders for II Corps to capture the Third objective (Tower Hamlets and Polygon Wood) on the Gheluveld Plateau, but at a Corps Commanders' conference on the evening of 31 July Jacob told him that this was not on, as the 30th Division had been pushed back to or just behind the first objective. Gough ordered II Corps to make a limited advance on the Gheluveld Plateau to reach the Black Line (the original second objective) on 2 August, while the other three corps were to retake the ground lost to counterattacks on 31 July and to reach the Green Line (the original third objective) on 4 August, and to take Langemark, with the Red Line (the limit beyond which opportunist exploitation was not to pass) to be taken at a later date. Haig agreed.

Haig urged Gough (Haig diary 31 July) to stick to "the original plan" and consolidate the ground gained and prepare for the next advance "only after adequate bombardment and after dominating the enemy artillery". Davidson (1 August) objected to hurried preparations, the use of "part worn" troops, and recommended Gough wait for two or three days of good flying weather to allow "careful and accurate (artillery) shooting". Haig now agreed with Davidson, urging Gough (who, he claimed, "quite agreed") that he should concentrate on the Gheluveld Plateau and that he should wait for two or three days of dry weather for artillery and infantry to operate effectively (Haig diary 2 August).

Lunching with Gough on 5 August, six days after Third Ypres began, Rawlinson recorded that "he is converted from the "huroosh" and now accepts the limited objective as the normal tactics". Kiggell wrote to Gough (7 August) urging him "to jump well within our power" and to persuade the government, who had agreed to the offensive with deep reluctance on condition it would be conducted as a series of step-by-step advances, of "our power to win decisively" by "let(ting) them see that at each bound we gain the line aimed at and maintain it against counterattack, and with moderate losses". "Boche beating, not gain of territory. Beat him first, then en avant". Tanks were to be used to crush enemy strongpoints after the main attack had passed by.

Haig urged Gough (8 August), given the bad state of the ground, to limit the depth of his advance to about 2,000 yd (1,800 m), so that his men would still be fresh to defeat German counterattacks. In August there were only three days (7, 19, 22) in which no rain was recorded; rainfall for the month was almost double the August average. Much of the battlefield turned into a quagmire in which men and animals sometimes drowned, making movement of men and supplies difficult and severely reducing the accuracy and effectiveness of artillery.

==== Battle of Langemarck ====
Gough delayed his planned attacks for a week. During the 2–10 August delay, corps reserves had to be used to relieve exhausted units in the line, instead of being kept to exploit the attack. The 10 August attack was in good weather but after rain two days earlier, not giving the ground enough time to dry. The 18th and 25th divisions attacked the Gheluveld Plateau on 10 August, aiming to capture the second objective from 31 July. They were heavily shelled by unsubdued German guns, and after initial progress were subjected to counterattacks, suffering 2,200 casualties for a gain of 450 yards (410 m) on the left and no progress on the right. Part of the reason for the failure of the attack on Westhoek to hold ground east of the village, was that Gough had dispersed his artillery along the rest of his front in readiness for the next big push.

The 16 August attack was originally scheduled for 14 August but Gough, Farrar-Hockley claims under pressure from Haig to make rapid progress to link up with the planned seaborne landing, allowed Jacob a postponement of only one day. A thunderstorm forced another. Although Second Army artillery were providing some assistance on the Gheluveld plateau, much of their strength was being dissipated assisting the Battle of Hill 70, a First Army attack by the Canadian Corps at Lens. Although Haig had urged concentration on the Gheluveld Plateau, at a conference at his house at Cassel (15 August) he "left this matter entirely to General Gough's discretion". The attack of 16 August was carried out across a wide front and after two days of heavy rain. The French on Gough's left, heavily equipped with artillery and facing weaker German defences, achieved their targets for a cost of only 350 casualties, while Cavan's XIV Corps on Gough's left also achieved its objectives against tired German forces which were in the process of being relieved. On the left an advance of 1,000–1,500 yards (910–1,370 m) was achieved. In the centre Gough's attacks were largely unsuccessful; the attacks on the Gheluveld plateau made initial progress but were driven back by counterattacks, without obtaining the second objective which had been the target on 10 August. Gough's forces suffered 15,000 casualties. Farrar-Hockley describes the 16 August attacks as "on balance a failure". Gough later claimed in his memoirs that he had visited Haig in his railway carriage twenty miles from Ypres and had advised him that "tactical success was not possible, or would be too costly under such conditions, and advised that the attack should now be abandoned" and that Haig had told him that with Russia dropping out of the war it was necessary for the BEF, the strongest Allied army at the moment, to wear down German strength, to prevent the Germans defeating France or Italy, as well as capturing the submarine bases and Gotha bomber bases and of the difficulties of persuading Lloyd George to see "the realities of the situation".

In the centre, the 16th (Irish) Division and 36th (Ulster) Division, both part of Watts' XIX Corps, had to attack fortified German farmhouses on Zonnebecke Ridge, not one of which had been subdued by artillery fire. When Gough accused the troops in question of not being able to hold onto their gains because they "were Irish and did not like the enemy's shelling", Haig was not impressed by Gough "playing the Irish Card" and noted that the men had been exhausted and that the bombardment had been ineffective. (Note: Before moving into the line, both divisions were exhausted after 13 days of moving heavy equipment. 16th Division had already suffered 2,000 casualties from enemy shelling and attacked with only 330 men per battalion, instead of the paper strength of 750. In one attacking battalion only 2 officers and 3 other ranks survived out of 330. The follow-up battalions initially did better, but "lost the creeping barrage" (i.e. the barrage moved on too far ahead as the infantry were held up on German resistance) and were driven back by counterattacks. The divisional history of the 36th Division, noted that this was the first time the division had failed to achieve its objectives, that it had already been in the line for 13 days, that 1,000 men per day had been needed to move up supplies under constant enemy shellfire, that reports of the ineffectiveness of the preparatory bombardment had not been believed and that the state of the ground had been so poor that men could barely drag themselves through it. By mid August, the 16th (Irish) had suffered over 4,200 casualties and the 36th (Ulster) had suffered almost 3,600 casualties, or more than 50% of their numbers.) Gough later came to regret the "Irish card" comments when he learned the facts. He told one of his chaplains in late August that the heart had gone out of a part of Fifth Army.

Haig noted (diary 18 August) that "Failure to advance on the right centre" was caused by "Commanders being in too great a hurry" and that three more days should have been allowed to allow artillery to gain the upper hand – the same advice he had given before the battle but had not enforced. He demanded Gough get the facts and then "talk the matter over with him". There is no evidence of Gough thinking the same way: at a conference of his corps commanders (17 August), he noted the tendency of his men to be driven back by counterattacks, wanting to court martial some officers and NCOs for "glaring instances" of this, and also complained that divisions were being rotated too quickly through the line, which might risk Fifth Army "running out of men". Gough proposed a series of piecemeal operations: XVIII Corps were to attack on 19 August, XIX Corps on 21 August, then II Corps on 22 August, in each case to seize the objectives which they had failed to achieve on 16 August. XIV, XVIII and XIX Corps were then to attack on 25 August, followed by II Corps later on the same day. There would then be a general advance at some unspecified future date. This plan was then abandoned as XIX and II Corps did not have enough fresh troops to attack.

It was decided instead that Maxse's XVIII Corps would attack on 19 August, then XIV and II Corps on 22 August. The former attack was successful, capturing fortified farmhouses near St Julien which had caused difficulty on 16 August (as the farmhouses were on dry ground, Maxse was able to use twelve tanks, protected by a smoke barrage). The attack on 22 August was unsuccessful owing to the ineffectiveness of the bombardment and German counterattacks, with no ground at all being gained on the Gheluveld Plateau.

Rain began again on 23 August. On 24 August Gough's intelligence branch informed him that the German defences were not linear but consisted of strongpoints in a chequerboard formation, with many German units held back for counterattack. Gough issued a new paper Modifications Required in Our Attack Formations to Meet the Enemy's Present System of Defence (24 August) –with a greater percentage of "moppers-up" to deal with bypassed enemy strongpoints, while larger numbers of troops were employed to withstand counterattacks. These tactics ("waves" followed by "worms") were later demonstrated to Third Army on 14 September, although in Simpson's view Gough did not appear to have realised that artillery superiority was needed to use them effectively.

==== Plumer takes over ====
Haig then saw Plumer (25 August), the day after the German counterattacks which recaptured Inverness Copse, and informed him that II Corps would soon be returned to his command, and that his Second Army was to take the lead in the offensive, to take the Gheluveld Plateau with a more cautious and methodical approach. He saw Gough later the same day and informed him that he was to undertake subsidiary attacks to assist Plumer.

By 26 August the rain had become torrential. XVIII Corps attacks on the St Julien spur failed (27 August), while that day Inverness Copse (on the Gheluveld Plateau) resisted its fourth assault. Simpson writes that the large attacks on 27 August were, like those on 22 August, "no more successful than those before". Farrar-Hockley blames the attack on Haig's orders to "press the enemy" and on Neill Malcolm's "speaking savagely" to the corps commanders. The Official History writes that the attack resulted in "considerable further casualties and very little gain in ground". Plumer's biographer describes it as "a bloody fiasco" in which some of Gough's men were left standing up to their knees in water for up to ten hours before zero hour. Prior & Wilson write that Gough's troops were exhausted by now after repeated attacks. Gough ordered another attack for 31 August.

Haig ordered Gough (28 August) to hand over command of II Corps effective early September, although he initially permitted him to make further limited attacks in the region of Inverness Copse until then which would facilitate the upcoming big push, but otherwise to train and rest his divisions ready to assist Plumer. However, when Gough proposed (30 August) to take this region on 3 September, Haig withheld permission as the weather conditions were not suitable.

Rawlinson, who was highly sceptical about the likelihood of the campaign succeeding, told Wilson that the command change was being made because "even he (Haig) began to see that Goughie was quite unable to do the job" (Wilson diary 29 August and 5 September). Haig wrote (diary 7 September) "I decided to stop Gough from going on with ... little attacks" which Haig thought "wasteful".

In early September Gough ordered XIX Corps to make small-scale attacks in the St Julien area. Not one of the fortified farmhouses was captured, and after the fourth attack Haig remonstrated with Gough. However, Gough protested (Haig diary, 9 September) that two of the divisions were soon to leave the salient, and that for the sake of their "training and morale" they should be made to retake ground which they had recently lost to counterattacks. Haig permitted a fourth, equally unsuccessful attack on 10 September. Kiggell (Haig diary 10 September) reported that "some of Gough's subordinates" did not give an honest answer as to the likely success of attacks and remarked to Neil Malcolm of the order to make only limited attacks: "We did not expect you to pursue the matter so vigorously". Fanshawe – GOC V Corps, which had recently replaced Watts' XIX Corps in the line – was opposed to further attacks, while the other corps commander McKenzie, possibly put up to it by Gough, was in favour. Haig then interviewed the divisional commanders, then urged Gough to desist, which Gough agreed to do. Aylmer Haldane recorded in his diary (10 September) William Lambton's lack of keenness at going to Fifth Army. Haig wrote (diary 18 September), after touring Fifth Army and corps HQ, that the Chief of Staff Malcolm seemed "fatigued" and that "Fifth Army staff work is not as satisfactory as last year."

==== Sidelined ====
Beginning on 20 September and into early October Plumer captured the Gheluveld Plateau, in drier weather and under cover of intense artillery fire (he had guns brought in from First, Third and Fourth Armies, and had twice as many guns for counter-battery alone as Gough had had for all purposes prior to 31 July), in a series of costly but effective set piece attacks (Menin Road – 20 September, Polygon Wood – 26 September, Broodseinde – 4 October). Fifth Army played a supporting role in Plumer's victory at Menin Road, making more use of new tactics: the "draw-net barrage" (which began 1,500 yards (1,400 m) behind the German front line then drew back towards it, demoralising the defenders), using the Stokes mortar as part of the creeping barrage, small columns of infantry following a wave of skirmishers and greater use of the rifle (as opposed to hand grenades) to repel counterattacks. Maxse also felt, ironically in view of the tactical debates of late June, that limiting the depth of the attack to 1,000 yards (910 m) had been worthwhile. The Fifth Army portion of the attack was conducted by 9th (Scottish) Division and 55th Division (under V Corps); 20th (Light) Division (under XIV Corps), and 51st (Highland) Division & 58th Division (under XVIII Corps). John Lee observes that 9th Scottish and 58th London, which were new to Fifth Army, reached their objectives, whereas the others did not, suggesting that the men had probably been worn out by excessive time spent on trench duty and labouring tasks, adding that "the anecdotal evidence of soldiers preferring service in Second, or any other, Army than Fifth is hard to ignore."

With a breakthrough apparently imminent, Haig ordered (26 September) that forces for exploitation, including cavalry, be ready to exploit to Roulers by 10 October, ready to link up with the long-postponed coastal advance and seaborne landing. Gough protested that 16 October was a more realistic date (Plumer's suggestion was 13–14 October) but was over-ruled by Haig. Gough appears to have anticipated a dramatic exploitation by mounted cavalry, but marginal notes by Haig on a memo from Neill Malcolm (1 October) indicate that he had misunderstood the Commander-in-Chief's intent – Haig envisaged cavalry being used more cautiously at first, in a dismounted role, in the event of German resistance breaking, a far cry from the dramatic exploitation which had been anticipated at the Somme.

The rain then resumed. Edmonds later claimed in the Official History, that at a conference on 7 October Gough and Plumer urged "a closing down" of the campaign, but were over-ruled by Haig, who cancelled the plans for cavalry exploitation but ordered that Passchendaele Ridge be taken. Prior & Wilson point out that there is no documentary evidence for the existence of this conference, either in contemporary records or in Haig's diary, nor did Gough make any such claim in his memoirs, although it would have been in his interests to do so. Gough had written to Howell Arthur Gwynne, editor of The Morning Post, on 6 October that he hoped the weather, although "wintry and rather wet", would hold long enough to permit further attacks.

During the night before First Passchendaele (12 October) Gough telephoned Plumer to suggest a postponement because of the foul weather, but Plumer, after consulting his corps commanders, decided to push on. (Note: Edmonds (1991, p. 340) states that the call was made "around midnight".) Gough recommended to Kiggell that the final operation (Second Passchendaele, in which the Canadians played a key role) be delayed until frost had dried out the ground, but Haig vetoed Kiggell's suggestion of a conference with Gough and Plumer and demanded (diary 26 October) that Gough and Plumer inspect the front lines and then report back to him. The offensive went ahead as planned.

Rawlinson recorded "things had not been running at all smoothly" in Fifth Army Staff (Diary 11 and 13 October 1917). By late 1917 he recorded that "intense feeling against Goughy" had "made many enemies" and led to the "formation of a sect of officers called the GMG" which stood for "Gough must go" (Rawlinson Diary 14 October 1917 and 1 November 1917). Kiggell advised Haig to send the Canadians to Plumer not Gough as they did not "work kindly" with Gough as he "drove them too much in the Somme fighting last year" (Haig Diary 5 October 1917 & 8 November 1917). Haig (diary 5 October) blamed Malcolm for the Canadians' reluctance to serve under Gough.

In November Kiggell warned Haig "of the strong wish of divisions not to be sent to Gough's Army". Haig at first (8 November) thought it best "not to mention to Gough the state of feeling among the troops" lest it "might make Gough lose confidence in himself". After Passchendaele, Malcolm was moved to command of 66th Division. Lord Derby (Secretary of State for War) warned Haig (11 November and 12 December) of Gough's growing unpopularity, among Canadian troops and at home in the UK. Derby again warned Haig (23 December 1917) that he was hearing many criticisms in London of Gough's responsibility for the "failure" of Third Ypres. That month Robertson had intervened on Gough's behalf when Lloyd George had wanted to sack him for "being one of those responsible for perpetrating the massacres" of Third Ypres.

=== Spring 1918 ===
==== Preparing the defence ====
Gough moved his HQ to Nesle (12 miles south of Péronne) in mid December 1917. In January 1918 Lt-Col Armitage recorded that in his meeting with Jan Smuts and Maurice Hankey (who were interviewing senior British generals to assess their suitability to replace Haig as Commander-in-Chief) "Gough, compared with other army commanders, did not come convincingly out of that interview as his views were somewhat narrow and he failed to put before Smuts the perilous position on his front". Yet Smuts' own account of the meeting recorded that he learned more about conditions at the front from Gough than from other generals, while Hankey recorded that Gough was "a terrific fellow, oozing with character and Irish humour".

Haig, anxious to protect the Channel Ports, had concentrated his reserves further north, leaving Fifth Army – now redeployed back down to the Somme, the southern part of the BEF's line – to bear the brunt of the German Operation Michael offensive. (Note: The British Army was given only 100,000 men rather than the 600,000 demanded, with other able-bodied men sent to shipbuilding, ship-crewing and agriculture; in spring 1918 reinforcements had to be obtained from the Middle East and from soldiers in the UK who would otherwise have been considered unfit for service in France. BEF divisions were reduced from twelve battalions to nine, and had to take over 40 miles (64 km) of French line, down to Barisis on the Oise, with men who should have been resting or training having to dig new defences. Haig was also under political pressure to hand over divisions to a central reserve at Versailles. As part of General Philippe Pétain's measures to restore French morale after the mutinies of spring 1917, French soldiers were given 10 days' leave every four months – around 350,000 French soldiers were often on leave at any time – as opposed to a fortnight after fifteen months in the BEF (a week every six months or men who had come out in 1914–15). Pétain also had a reserve of 19 French divisions in the central part of his front between the Oise and the Argonne and 15 divisions on his eastern sector – German intelligence was feigning attacks in Champagne, at Verdun, or even via Switzerland.) Gough was ordered to prepare a "battle zone" 2,000–3,000 yards (1,800–2,700 m) deep, 1 mile (1.6 km) behind the front line, and a "rearward zone" 6–8 miles (9.7–12.9 km) behind the battle zone. The only defensive feature of note was the River Somme (which runs roughly north–south south of Péronne) in his rear, and the Crozat Canal connecting the Somme to the Oise. He had only eleven divisions (and 3 cavalry, equivalent in firepower to one infantry division) rather than the seventeen he demanded. 39th and 20th (Light) Divisions, both in GHQ Reserve, were placed in his rear. Gough had to take over two more sections of line (12 miles (19 km) and 18 miles (29 km) respectively) in mid January, leaving him holding 42 miles (68 km) of front, (as opposed to Third Army to his north, which had 14 divisions to hold 28 miles (45 km)).

At a corps commanders' conference on 3 February, Gough warned them that intelligence had deduced that Oskar von Hutier, who had recently taken Riga in September 1917, was opposite them. Edward Beddington acted as Fifth Army Chief of Staff until 10 February 1917, when Neill Malcolm's replacement Brigadier-General Jocelyn Percy became available. Beddington later wrote highly of Gough's active mind, "full of ideas, some excellent and some the reverse". Gough also badgered Haig and Pétain (Anthoine, his old colleague from Third Ypres, was now Chief of Staff at French GQG) and was assured that Georges Louis Humbert's French Third Army at Clermont was earmarked to reinforce him.

==== Asking for reinforcements ====
A memorandum (4 February 1918) from Maj-Gen Tavish Davidson (Chief of Operations at GHQ) discussed the possibility of Gough having to fall back to positions defending the Somme Crossings, although he stressed that such a retreat would be bad for morale, but made no mention of Gough's lack of manpower. Davidson proposed building a fortified bridgehead around the Somme crossings at Brie and Péronne, and wanted Gough to fortify the River Tortille, which runs roughly northeast from Péronne to the Canal du Nord. A further request for reinforcements resulted in formal orders (9 February 1918) from Lt-Gen Herbert Lawrence (Chief of Staff BEF), ordering Gough to be prepared to conduct a fighting retreat and then conduct counterattacks – it may well be that although the German attack was expected it was thought it would be a subsidiary attack prior to an attack on the French in Champagne. Some extra labourers were made available. The total number of labourers in Fifth Army sector rose from 17,400 (30 December) to 24,217 (early February) to 48,154 by mid March (out of 354,577 in the BEF as a whole) but no more than 8,830 were ever available per week. Most of them were used to build roads, railways, depots, hospitals, water reservoirs – not fortifications.

Derby wrote to Haig (5 March) that Gough did "not have the confidence of the troops he commands", that Lloyd George had "spoken to (Haig) on the subject" and that his letter was an "indefinite order" which Haig could use as "a loophole" to remove Gough. It is unlikely that Derby, a Conservative, was much influenced by Liberal MPs who remembered the Curragh incident, but he may well have been influenced by Henry Wilson. Lord Bertie (British Ambassador to Paris) suggested to Haig (5 March) that Gough be appointed governor of Gibraltar. Haig ignored both suggestions.

Gough was active in inspecting units to encourage the construction of defences. When he visited Divisional HQ of 16th Irish Division on 14 March Maj-Gen Charles Hull suggested strengthening the battle (second) zone, but Gough replied "The Germans are not going to break my line".

Haig inspected the front with Gough (7 March). From north to south Fifth Army then consisted of Walter Congreve's VII Corps, Herbert Watts' XIX Corps (containing 66th Division now commanded by Neill Malcolm), Ivor Maxse's XVIII Corps and III Corps. The latter was commanded by Richard Butler, recently removed as Deputy Chief of Staff BEF, and who had never before commanded a large formation in battle but was now holding the weakest part of the front. None of these corps had any division in reserve. After this inspection Haig released 39th Division (north of Péronne) to control of Fifth Army, and brought 50th Division, still in GHQ Reserve, down from Flanders to a point 30 miles (48 km) west of St Quentin – given the 24 hours' notice required, it would take two and a half days to reach the front when needed. Gough also requested that men from 20th (still in GHQ Reserve behind his front) and 50th Divisions be used to help dig defences, but this was vetoed by GHQ.

Gough had a reasonable idea of the size and timing of the German attack from air reconnaissance and interrogation of prisoners, although many at GHQ believed the attack would not be until a few days or weeks. Lawrence was in the habit of referring to Gough as "young Goughie", although the latter was his senior in rank (Note: Lawrence, Haig's contemporary, had left the Army after the Boer War when Haig, not himself, was given command of the 17th Lancers.) Farrar-Hockley argues that Lawrence and Davidson were personally unsympathetic to Gough and in early 1918 effectively starved him of reinforcements which Haig might, if asked, have agreed to send. He argues that Gough ought to have demanded to speak to Haig personally, which was his right but not the etiquette of the time. On the evening of Tuesday 19 March Lawrence ("purring on the telephone like a damned pussycat") once again refused permission to move up the 20th and 50th Divisions.

==== 21 March ====
The German attack began at 4:40 am on 21 March; Gough, Beddington and other rear echelon officers recorded being awakened at around 5:10 am, when British artillery, hampered by the fog, began to return fire. The Germans had over 8,000 guns and trench mortars. (Note: As opposed to the few hundred of the disastrously ineffective British attack of 1 July 1916.) Much of the German bombardment (described by eyewitnesses as "a wall of orange flame" and "a sea of fire") concentrated on British headquarters and communications, while pauses were left in the bombardment of the British front lines to tempt the defenders out of their shelters. Gas was also used, although mustard gas was not used in areas through which German troops were to pass. 19 German divisions assaulted six of Julian Byng's Third Army, while 43 German divisions attacked Fifth Army (13 divisions plus 2 in GHQ Reserve). Many British divisions were at little more than half strength, and none more than two-thirds, giving the Germans a 4:1 numerical superiority on Byng's front and over 8:1 on Gough's.

At 8:30 am Gough ordered the 20th and 50th Divisions to be ready to move up to the front, and obtained retrospective permission from GHQ. Gough spent the morning at his own headquarters listening to reports as they came in – III Corps forward zone was already reported overrun by 10 am – and reading reports of the rounding up of labourers and pioneers into ad hoc fighting units, as he would have been putting himself out of communication had he attempted to tour the front. At around 1 pm General Humbert arrived, telling Gough that he had only a skeleton staff but no troops to send (je n'ai que mon fanion – "I've only the pennant on my car"), and promising to lobby GQG to send French divisions. At 2 pm, after studying aerial reconnaissance reports (the fog had cleared enough by 12:30 pm for British planes to be launched), Gough ordered the corps commanders to begin a fighting retreat, described by Beddington as "a right and brave decision arrived at very quickly". He was disinclined to speak to Lawrence or Davidson again, and disappointed not to hear directly from Haig himself that day. In the afternoon he visited his corps commanders one by one. Formal orders to fall back were issued at 9:45 pm. Haig (diary 21 March) approved Gough's withdrawal. Haig (diary 21 March) appears to have regarded the initial day's fighting as a creditable result, knowing as he did that the first day was often the most successful of any offensive, and GHQ (from their 2 March appraisal) appear to have believed that the main German effort would fall somewhere else, perhaps against the French in Champagne.

To avoid a repetition of the chaos of the August 1914 retreat, Gough took particular care to order that corps headquarters retreat to spots which he had selected (sited on existing signal cables) and keep a tight grip on the location of their division headquarters. That evening he spoke to Lawrence on the telephone, who told him that the Germans were unlikely to attack again the next day as they would be too busy reorganising their tired troops and collecting their wounded – Gough claimed to have "emphatically" disagreed, and that evening Haig agreed to send a second division being moved down from Flanders – one was already on its way – to Gough's sector.

Martin Kitchen takes a rather different point of view, arguing that Haig was misled by Gough's overly favourable report. Haig therefore did not ask the French for reinforcements until after midnight of 21/22 March, and then asked for only three divisions – half what had been agreed under "Hypothesis A" – which reached the British line on 23 March. Following Haig's request, Pétain agreed to send two divisions and some dismounted cavalry under General Maurice Pelle to cover the French left flank. This news reached Gough the following morning. On the evening of 21 March Pétain, having heard that Butler's III Corps had been unable to hold the line of the Crozat Canal the previous evening, had also at last agreed that French 125th Division be deployed to III Corps sector.

==== 22–25 March ====
At 10:45 am on 22 March, following a telephone request from Congreve for clarification of his previous verbal instructions, Gough issued written orders to corps commanders to retreat "in the event of serious hostile attacks" the forward line of the Rear Zone ("the Green Line" in front of the Somme – in practice little more than a line of signposts and wire). Fifth Army staff also informed corps commanders of the impending French reinforcement and Gough's hopes to withdraw III Corps to form a reserve. On receiving these messages at around noon, Maxse ordered XVIII Corps to withdraw immediately, without cover of artillery fire, and they fell back behind the Somme altogether that evening. Gough attempted to halt Maxse's withdrawal when he heard of it, but it was too late. Maxse's precipitate retreat allowed a German penetration at Béthencourt on his left flank, forcing Watts XIX Corps on his left to fall back also. Watts' falling back in turn jeopardised V Corps (part of Byng's Third Army) still holding the Flesquières Salient.

London was soon awash with exaggerated rumours, based largely on accounts of stragglers and chaos in rear areas, that Fifth Army had broken. Haig at last visited Gough on 23 March, meeting his requests for reinforcements with a laconic "well, Hubert, you can't fight without men," but wrote in his diary of his dismay that Fifth Army had "gone so far back without making some kind of stand". At 4 pm on 23 March Haig and Pétain met at Dury. Pétain agreed to deploy his Reserve Army Group (GAR – two armies under Émile Fayolle) to operate in the Somme Valley. (Note: Pétain came away from this meeting with the impression that Haig intended to retreat on the Channel Ports, and Byng later informed Edmonds that he had been left with a similar impression. However, Haig's diary – the authenticity of which has been questioned for this period – claims that he intended if necessary to retreat in the north to maintain contact with the French.) Gough was ordered to hold the line of the Somme (roughly north–south south of Péronne) "... at all costs. There will be no withdrawal...." and informed that as of 11 pm on Sunday 24 March Fifth Army would be placed under Fayolle's orders, making the Somme (roughly east–west between Amiens and Peronne) the Anglo-French boundary. VII Corps, north of the bend in the Somme, was placed under Third Army's orders at the end of 24 March.

Bertie recorded (24 March), somewhat prematurely, that Haig had saved Gough's job. By 24 March the Germans had broken through into open country, although officers on the ground were organising stragglers and rear echelon troops into scratch formations. Reinforcements (1st Cavalry Division on Gough's left to maintain contact with Third Army, 35th Division down from Flanders into VII Corps sector, and Robillot's II French Cavalry Corps (whose formations were in fact mainly infantry) in XVIII Corps sector) were beginning to take their place in Gough's line. On Gough's right III Corps were now under the command of General Pelle, but its units were becoming interspersed with French units as Butler had been attempting to withdraw them, and had lost control of the situation.

Herbert Lawrence visited Fifth Army on 24 March (Haig was visiting Byng's Third Army that day) and reported that it had "still plenty of life" despite shortage of numbers, and that Gough was planning a counterattack by four British brigades and 22nd French Division against a bridgehead which the Germans had made over the Somme at Pargny (threatening a breach between Watts' and Maxse's Corps).

The planned counterattack did not take place as General Robillot refused to co-operate, despite a personal visit from Maxse on the morning of 25 March, and Watts' Corps had to fall back from the line of the Somme. Gough spent much of that day visiting Maxse and Watts, and reconnoitring the ground east of Amiens which his troops would have to hold next. Gough ordered 2,000 rear echelon troops – mainly engineers (including 500 Americans), tunnellers, and signallers – to be formed into a unit under temporary command of Maj-Gen PG Grant, Fifth Army Chief Engineer, to work on the defences and fight if necessary. Brigadier-General Carey, due to return from leave on the afternoon of the 26th to take command of a division, was notified that he was instead to take command of this force, to be known as "Carey's Force".

==== 26 March ====
Gough was not invited to the Army Commanders' meeting 11 am on 26 March, at which Haig told Plumer, Horne and Byng that Amiens was to be held "at all costs" until the French were in a position to give more support.

Brigadier-General James Walter Sandilands later recorded that, returning from leave, in the chaos he was unable to locate his brigade (104th Brigade, part of 35th Division), or even find out which corps it was currently part of. Making his way to Fifth Army Headquarters on 26 March by asking a lift from a man who knew him by sight, he found Gough having his teeth examined, but decided "discretion was the better part of valour" and beat a hasty retreat from the room. At about 11am a car drew up containing Alfred Milner (Secretary of State for War) and Wilson, now CIGS, who asked whether it was safe to drive into Amiens. Sandilands pointed out that Gough was in the building, assuming that they would wish to speak to him, but Wilson replied "Oh he is here is he? Well good morning" and drove off. Sandilands thought "that's the end of Gough". He later realised that they had been on their way to the Doullens Conference at which Ferdinand Foch was appointed generalissimo.

At the Doullens Conference that afternoon Wilson suggested to Haig that Rawlinson and his staff, currently at Versailles, could replace Gough (in the Official History Edmonds openly blamed Wilson for Gough's dismissal, so that he could remove Rawlinson, "a strong man" from Versailles). Pétain (who, according to Haig had "a terrible look. He had the appearance of a commander who had lost his nerve") said of Gough's Fifth Army "Alas it no longer really exists ... From the first they have refused to engage the enemy ... they have run like the Italians at Caporetto". This was an exaggeration, and angered even the Francophile Henry Wilson. Pétain told the meeting that 24 French divisions (at another meeting at Compiegne the previous day he had given the figure as 15 divisions) were en route to prevent a German breakthrough to Amiens.

By 26 March Gough had received a British infantry division from Italy, as well as three Australian and one New Zealand Divisions. Maxse was maintaining his place in the line, despite pressure from the French to join them in retreating south-westwards. Gough had to send a messenger, Paul Maze, to Humbert's headquarters, with orders to get back XVIII Corps artillery which had been lent temporarily to the French, with orders not to leave until he had obtained written orders for its return. Gough spent much of the afternoon with Watts, whose sector was also being strongly attacked. Gough returned to his headquarters, now moved back from Villers-Bretonneux to Dury, for a meeting with Foch (who was also establishing his own headquarters at Dury) and Maxime Weygand at 4 pm. Speaking in French, Foch demanded to know why Gough was not in the front line himself, why Fifth Army was falling back, and why there was no defence as at First Ypres in 1914. Gough thought him "peremptory, rude and excited", but such a manner was common in French generals, whose subordinates also sometimes answered back in similar vein. Gough telephoned Haig to complain, adding that French troops were falling back at a much faster rate than his own. Haig recorded that Gough complained that Foch had been "most impertinent" to him. After meeting with Gough, Foch saw Fayolle (Reserve Army Group commander) and was rather more civil to him.

At 5 pm, after the Doullens conference, Haig met Milner and Wilson – he recorded that he told them that no matter what opinion at home might think, or what Foch had just said, he thought Gough "had dealt with a most difficult situation very well. He had never lost his head, was always cheery and fought hard."

On the evening of 26 March Gough telephoned Lawrence to say that the Germans were weakening and often falling back in the face of local counterattacks, and that with three fresh divisions (he had in reserve only two composite battalions and a Canadian motor machine-gun battery, which he had had to send to Watts' sector) he could push them back to the Somme. He recorded that "Lawrence laughed and said it was good to hear that we had plenty of fight still left, though no reinforcements at the moment could be sent." In fact Byng's Third Army had been prioritised for reinforcements, and had been sent seven divisions since 22 March.

==== Dismissed ====
Bertie recorded (27 March) that Haig himself might be sacked instead of Gough. Gough spent much of 27 March with Watts, who was still facing strong German attacks although beginning to drive them back with counterattacks, and then with Maxse whose XVIII Corps was about to be relieved by French troops coming into the line. He returned to his HQ at about 5 pm, to find Haig's Military Secretary Maj-Gen Harold Goodeve Ruggles-Brise, who informed him to his surprise that he was to be relieved of command of Fifth Army and was to hand over command to Rawlinson the following day.

Gough had to deal with a final crisis as the Germans were crossing the east–west portion of the Somme at Cerisy, threatening XIX Corps rear. Byng, on hearing this news had moved 1st Cavalry Division south of the Somme and returned it to Gough's command pending the arrival of 61st Division by hastily organised motor transport. Gough eventually telephoned Foch at 3 am on 28 March to ask permission for Watts to withdraw further, although he later regretted not having simply made the decision on his own authority. XIX Corps and Carey's Force were able to hold the Stop Line on 28 March.

Gough handed over command to Rawlinson at 4:30 pm on 28 March. Beddington and other staff officers remained to ease the transition. Over dinner (29 March) Haig told Gough that he wanted him out of the line, along with a Reserve Army staff, to prepare an east–west line of defence along the Somme from Amiens to the sea (in case the Germans broke through and the BEF had to form a defensive perimeter around the Channel Ports). Gough set up Reserve Army HQ at Crécy on 3 April – this would later form the nucleus of the reconstituted Fifth Army under William Birdwood (remnants of Gough's previous army were now renamed the Fourth and under Rawlinson).

Haig defended Gough to Lloyd George during a car journey (3 April) – he recorded that Lloyd George was looking for a scapegoat for the manpower problem and for his attempts to redeploy divisions to the Middle East contrary to Robertson's advice, and that Lloyd George demanded Gough's dismissal on the grounds that he had neither held nor destroyed the Somme bridges. Haig, by his own account, replied that "could not condemn an officer unheard" and refused to sack him unless given a direct order to do so. The next day (4 April) Haig received a telegram from Lord Derby ordering that Gough be dismissed altogether on the grounds of "having lost the confidence of his troops". Haig held a farewell lunch with Gough on 5 April.

Gough's formations had retreated over 40 miles (64 km) and communications often broke down. However, he had averted a complete disaster. Andrew Roberts offers a favourable assessment of Gough's contribution:

... the offensive saw a great wrong perpetrated on a distinguished (sic) British commander that was not righted for many years. Gough's Fifth Army had been spread thin on a forty-two-mile front lately taken over from the exhausted and demoralised French. The reason why the Germans did not break through to Paris, as by all the laws of strategy they ought to have done, was the heroism of the Fifth Army and its utter refusal to break. They fought a thirty-eight-mile rearguard action, contesting every village, field and, on occasion, yard . . . With no reserves and no strongly defended line to its rear, and with eighty German divisions against fifteen British, the Fifth Army fought the Somme offensive to a standstill on the Ancre, not retreating beyond Villers-Bretonneux...

Martin Kitchen takes a more critical view, pointing out that troops were initially under orders not to retire from the forward zone, that there were no adequate lines of communications between corps, and that Gough caused further trouble by issuing orders direct to lower formations, even down to brigade level. Gough "muddle(d) through ... to the limit of his very modest abilities".

== Disgrace and after ==
=== Scapegoat ===
Lord Derby (Secretary of State for War) informed the War cabinet (4 April) (Note: Farrar-Hockley gives this as 14 April, which appears to be a misprint.) that he was demanding a full report on the recent reverse suffered by Fifth Army.

Gough visited Derby (8 April) to ask about an inquiry – he recorded that Derby was "pleasant enough, almost genial", but appeared glad when the interview was over. In the House of Commons Lloyd George (9 April) refused to rule out a court martial for Gough, praised General George Glas Sandeman Carey for forming an ad hoc force to hold back the enemy in the Fifth Army sector, apparently unaware that the initiative had come from Gough when Carey was still on leave, and praised Byng (GOC Third Army) for only retreating when forced to do so by Fifth Army's retreat, apparently unaware of Byng's folly in clinging to the Flesquières Salient. Byng wrote to the editor of the Daily Express (19 April) that Gough was "talking too much and had better keep quiet".

Lloyd George told the War Cabinet (11 April) that the Liberal War Committee (a committee of backbench MPs) had made "very serious protests" to him that afternoon against the retention of "incompetent" officers like Gough and Richard Haking.

When the War Cabinet demanded a progress report into the inquiry into the Fifth Army debacle (1 May), General George Macdonogh (Director of Military Intelligence) reminded them the following day that the Under-Secretary of State had recently informed the House of Commons that, with the German Spring Offensives still in progress, the Government thought it unwise to put pressure on Haig.

After Lloyd George survived the Maurice Debate (9 May) with a misleading speech, Gough wrote to Lord Milner (now Secretary of State for War), in the hope that an inquiry into the Fifth Army would reveal the lack of reserves, only to receive a reply from the Under-Secretary that he was "mistaken" in thinking that there had been a promise of an inquiry (it is unclear whether this was an error or a deliberate lie). A furious Gough wrote to a friend in June that none of the other Army Commanders would have had the resilience to handle such a massive German attack, and that he "never wanted to wear the uniform of England again". He resisted the temptation to breach King's Regulations by airing his views in public as Maurice had done or to brief Opposition MPs.

Haig in fact wrote to his wife (16 June) claiming that "some orders (Gough) issued and things he did were stupid" (it is unclear to what Haig was referring) and claiming that he would "stick up for him as I have hitherto done" although he had not in fact specifically done so in his report of 12 May, in which he had blamed the German crossing of the Oise on the fog and the low level of the water owing to the recent dry weather. Haig also (letter of 6 July, replying belatedly to a letter of Gough's of 21 June) claimed that he had defended Gough from political criticism throughout the winter of 1917–18 and advised him to keep quiet so that he could be restored to an active command when memories had faded. In August, stung by a letter from Lord Roberts' widow that he owed a duty to protect the reputation of the men of Fifth Army, Gough had an interview with Lord Milner, who blamed the events of March on poor defence, incompetent leadership and the reluctance of the troops to fight, and bluntly refused to help.

=== Rehabilitation ===
Press reports of the events of March 1918 appeared in the National Review and the Illustrated Sunday Herald in October 1918, while officers and men returning after the Armistice were able to challenge claims that the Fifth Army had been defeated because morale had been poor and the soldiers had lacked confidence in Gough's leadership (although in practice few front line soldiers would have known the name of their Army Commander). At a dinner on board his train in February 1919 Haig confessed to Edward Beddington that he agreed that Gough's treatment had been "harsh and undeserved" but that "public opinion at home, whether right or wrong, (had) demanded a scapegoat" and he had been "conceited enough to think that the Army could not spare" himself rather than Gough – Beddington agreed that this had been the correct decision at the time.

Beddington later complained to Haig that he had only given Gough "faint praise" in his Final Despatch, and that he had been "fobbed off" with a KCMG instead of being promoted to field marshal and being given a cash grant. Haig was angry, although he later invited Gough to his home at Bemersyde to repair their relations.

Gough was not in London for the peace ceremonies (he was on a business trip to Baku), and it is unclear whether he knew that he was one of the senior officers (including Robertson and Hamilton) whom Lloyd George deliberately did not invite.

A further official statement in March 1919 declared that "the matter was now closed". However, in May 1919 Gough received a handwritten note from the new Secretary of State for War, Winston Churchill (Edmonds – Official History 1918 Vol II p. 119 – attributes the letter wrongly to Churchill's predecessor Lord Milner), praising the "gallant fight of the Fifth Army" and promising to consider Gough for "command appropriate to (his) rank and service". Gough was initially angry that this was not a full exoneration and implied that he might be employed in his permanent rank of lieutenant-general (not as an acting full general, the rank he had held at the time of his dismissal), but eventually accepted because of the praise given to Fifth Army.

=== Baltic Mission ===
He was appointed Chief of the Allied Military Mission to the Baltic on 19 May 1919. The British forces consisted solely of a squadron of cruisers. Britain hoped that the White forces would overthrow the Bolsheviks, but was not sure which side would triumph, and British policy was to encourage independence for Russia's Baltic subject peoples and Finland (which the Whites privately did not want). Gough was privately briefed by the Foreign Secretary Lord Curzon not to let Churchill push him into intervention, and not to let troops supported by England occupy Petrograd, which might cause friction with future Russian governments. Gough struck up good relations with the White leader General Nikolai Yudenich and with the Latvian and Estonian leaders, but urged the other nationalities not to attack Russia, causing the Finns to back off from their plans to march on Petrograd. The Iron Division (German troops under Rüdiger von der Goltz, occupying Lithuania and Latvia) also backed off from their plans to attack Russia, and after initial attempts to defy British demands were persuaded by Gough's firm stand (firmer, in fact, than that of the authorities in London) to depart for Germany by rail. However, White Russian opinion was angered by the independence of Finland, Estonia and Latvia, and émigré groups in London, both imperialist and social democrat, put it about that Gough was in the pay of the Bolsheviks, while gossips also talked again of his "responsibility" for Third Ypres. Gough was once again sacked at the Prime Minister's insistence on 25 October 1919 and returned home, and neither sought nor was offered further military employment. He was awarded the GCMG in 1919.

Gough was a signatory to joint statement issued with other officers and advisors who had served in Russia, who on 23 February 1920 indicated their support of peace between the British and the Bolshevik Russia.

Gough retired from the Army as a full general on 26 October 1922, although owing to an administrative error he was initially told that he would receive the pension of a full colonel, his substantive rank as of August 1914.

=== Possible political career ===
As he had now become convinced of the merits of Home Rule he declined an offer to stand as an Ulster Unionist for a Belfast seat in the November 1918 General Election, despite an interview with Edward Carson whom he found more "broadminded" in private than the uncompromising speeches which he was delivering in public.

Gough's name was proposed to the Cabinet early in 1921 by William O'Brien as a potential Lord Lieutenant of Ireland (in succession to Lord French). Nothing came of this, but he stood unsuccessfully as an Asquith Liberal (i.e. opposed to Lloyd George's coalition government) in the 1922 Chertsey by-election. During the campaign he stressed his opposition to the policy of reprisals which had been employed in Ireland. Gough would later decline further attempts to persuade him to stand for Parliament in the 1922 General Election.

After the May 1929 General Election he recorded his dislike of the "fierce old women who support, and in large part constitute, the Tory Party" and of the "arrogant audacity" with which they appropriated the Union Jack as a party symbol. However, in March 1931 he declined another offer to stand for Parliament as a Liberal, not least because of his dislike of Lloyd George, who was now Liberal leader.

== Later life ==
=== Farming and business career ===
Gough initially (August 1918) found that his recent "difficulties" in France would make it difficult for him to pick up company directorships. In October 1918 he attended an agriculture course at Cambridge University, most of the other students being wounded or invalided officers, and was there when the armistice was announced. In November 1918 he went on an expedition to Armenia, on behalf of a merchant banker, to investigate the affairs of a British company there.

With four daughters to support, from the summer of 1920 (i.e. after his return from the Baltics) Gough attempted to earn his living as a pig and poultry farmer at Burrows Lea at Gomshall in Surrey. He also became a director of the Ashley Trading Company, initially selling US-manufactured wallpaper paste in Britain. In 1925–26 he bought land in Kenya with a view to moving out there, but thought better of it, in part because so much of his time was taken up with the affairs of Fifth Army veterans, and also because his farm in Surrey was not succeeding as he had hoped. He sold Burrows Lea in 1927.

The reputation which Gough had won on his commercial trip to Baku in 1919 enabled him to obtain several directorships, including Siemens Brothers and Caxton Electrical Development Company. After the economic downturn, coupled with poor performance by junior managers, led to the bankruptcy of several smaller companies of which he was a director, he exercised a much more hands-on management than was normal for directors. His business interests included slate quarries in Wales and the supply of electrical equipment in Warsaw. He was also involved in the management and fundraising of King's College Hospital and St Mary's Hospital, London. As late as 1950, aged eighty, he was still chairman of Siemens Brothers, and a chairman or director of nine other companies.

=== Battle of the memoirs ===
The war correspondent Philip Gibbs, freed of the constraints of wartime censorship, wrote in Realities of War (1920) of the incompetence of British generals and of their staffs, the latter having "the brains of canaries and the manners of Potsdam". His main target was Gough's Fifth Army, although he wrote highly of Plumer and Harington's leadership of Second Army.

The Fifth Army in France in 1918 by Walter Shaw Sparrow (1921) gave some indication of the strain of the battle which Fifth Army had borne, although the book, written at the time of the Irish War of Independence, tended to denigrate the 16th (Irish) Division at the expense of the 36th (Ulster) Division. Gough thought Sparrow "a fine old fighter".

Part II of Churchill's World Crisis appeared in 1927, and praised Gough's role in March 1918. In March 1930 Gough was approached by Lord Birkenhead to assist with the writing of a chapter on the March 1918 crisis in his forthcoming book Turning Points in History. Over dinner Birkenhead discussed how Haig had "completely lost the confidence" of the British War Cabinet by the end of 1917, and how in Birkenhead's opinion – which Gough did not share – Pétain's alleged entreaties had been "lie(s) and bluff" by the "d-d French" which did not justify a continuation of the Third Ypres Offensive. (Note: Haig had recently claimed, following the publication of Churchill's World Crisis, that Pétain had been begging him to attack to take pressure off the French Army. The truth of the matter remains unclear.) The book was published in October 1930 (after Birkenhead's death) and the book's praise of Gough's handling of the March 1918 Offensive was widely quoted in newspaper reviews.

Gough's conduct of the Somme and Third Ypres was strongly criticised by the Australian Official Historian Charles Bean (1929 and 1933). Gough angrily denied Bean's account of the events at Pozières in July 1916 (Edmonds, the British Official Historian, had passed on his comments to Bean in 1927) and Bean's claim (in the 1916 volume, published 1929) that he was "temperamentally" prone to hasty attacks without proper reconnaissance.

After the publication of Birkenhead's essay, and the news that his old colleague Maj-Gen Sir George Aston was earning good money as a newspaper correspondent, Gough wrote his own account The Fifth Army (1931). He approached the King's adviser Lord Stamfordham as to whether His Majesty would be willing to mark the anniversary of March 1918 with a public tribute to the Fifth Army, only to be brushed aside by another Royal adviser Clive Wigram with the news that the King would prefer Gough, like Haig, not to write his memoirs. In the end the book was a great success. Gough was dissuaded from sending a copy to the King, but sent a copy to the Prince of Wales, receiving a handwritten note in reply. The book was ghosted by the novelist Bernard Newman. He made no mention of his dispute with Walker on 18 July 1916, although he pointedly omitted him from a list praising officers commanding Australian formations. Gough claimed that he had often vetoed attacks by subordinates if he thought them under-prepared, on too narrow a front, or in inadequate strength – Sheffield & Todman argue that this was a deliberate answer to Bean's charges. Writing about the Tavish Davidson memorandum of June 1917, he claimed that he had wanted to attack in shorter jumps (a claim not supported by contemporary documents) but that Plumer had insisted on going all-out for a deep objective on the first day. Gough also claimed that the delay in launching Third Ypres (from 25 to 31 July 1917) wasted good weather and "was fatal to our hopes" – this is untrue. The relevant chapters were also published separately as The March Retreat (1934).

In the mid-1930s the volume of Lloyd George's memoirs covering Third Ypres was published. During the ensuing newspaper correspondence Lloyd George quoted Gough's name in an attack on Haig, causing Gough to write to the newspapers in Haig's defence. Ahead of the publication of the 1918 volume, Gough dined twice with Lloyd George and his historical adviser B. H. Liddell Hart. Gough was initially impressed by the former Prime Minister's charisma, and was almost persuaded that he had had nothing to do with his sacking in April 1918, until he remembered that both Esher and Birkenhead had told him the truth years earlier. Lloyd George, who may well have been keen to appease a potential critic, eventually sent Gough a letter (described as "carefully worded" by Farrar-Hockley) claiming that new facts had come to his attention since that date, and admitting that Gough had been "let down" and that "no General could have won that battle".

In 1936 Gough complained to Liddell Hart that Haig had dominated his Army Commanders instead of taking them into his confidence and discussing matters, a view later made much of by the Canadian academic Tim Travers – Sheffield points out that this view not only needs to be treated with caution (Haig in fact held regular conferences) but sits ill with the evidence of Gough's own command habits. He complained to Edmonds (in 1938) that other Army and corps commanders did not issue enough detailed guidance to their subordinates.

=== Final military service ===
Gough's colleagues continued to lobby the Government for him to receive an award (e.g. promotion to field marshal, a peerage and/or a cash grant) similar to that given the other army commanders at the end of the war. The Prime Minister Stanley Baldwin declined to do so in response to a Question in the Commons (10 November 1936), although he acknowledged that Gough's reputation had been vindicated. After further lobbying (in part by Master of the Rolls Wilfred Greene, a former major on Gough's staff) Gough was turned down for a GCB in King George VI's 1937 Coronation Honours, but was eventually given the award in the Birthday Honours of the same year. His GCB was seen as official rehabilitation.

From 1936 until 1943, Gough was honorary colonel of the 16th/5th The Queen's Royal Lancers, at the insistence of the regiments concerned, despite some resistance from the War Office because of his role in the Curragh incident.

In the summer of 1938 Gough was invited by Hitler to visit a Nuremberg Rally, but declined as the Foreign Office refused to give him formal approval and advice (General Ian Hamilton accepted a similar invitation while visiting Berlin on behalf of the British Legion). In 1939, prior to the outbreak of war, Gough was initially appointed a "conducting officer" to supervise the evacuation of women and children to Kent and Sussex, but was asked to resign after it was pointed out that to use a distinguished general in this role was a gift to German propaganda. He later rejoined the organisation as a "duty officer" (an administrative role in London) and also served as a member of an "emergency squad" standing by to give assistance in the event of air raids, while continuing to write newspaper articles. In March 1940 he visited the French Army, where he met General Maurice Gamelin and inspected part of the Maginot Line – he was unimpressed by the French troops he saw, and thought effort had been wasted on fortifications which could have been used on training.

In May 1940 Gough joined the LDV (Home Guard) and was put in command of the Chelsea Home Guard, which he organised from scratch. News of his efficient performance reached Churchill's ears, and in June 1940 he was soon promoted to Zone Commander (Note: Equivalent to brigadier, according to Home Guard (United Kingdom)#Ranks.) Fulham & Chelsea, in command of parts of Fulham and Victoria, but declined further promotion as he wished to enjoy his last chance of hands-on leadership of a military unit. A blind eye was turned to Gough's age (the official upper age limit was 65) until August 1942, when he was at last asked to retire. By now he was suffering from arthritis, which would eventually see him walk with sticks and then become a wheelchair-user.

Gough helped to found, and was president of, the Irish Servicemen's Shamrock Club, which opened in March 1943 off Park Lane, London W.1, with a grant of £1,000 from Guinness.

=== Third Ypres and the Official History ===
The volume of the Official History covering Third Ypres went through several drafts and did not appear until 1948, by which time the Official Historian James Edward Edmonds was in his late eighties. Gough, then in his mid-seventies, and remembering events of thirty years earlier with limited access to documents, lobbied hard to have himself shown in a better light, arguing that Haig had put verbal pressure on him to achieve a breakthrough towards Roulers.

Edmonds wrote to Wynne (17 February 1944), the author of the relevant volume, "Gough was out to fight and get forward. He had no idea how to conduct the action Haig required and would not take advice. I heard him complain that the troops had no "blood lust", the officers no "spirit of the offensive". In the same letter Edmonds repeated the story of how Gough had once come into the officers' mess at Fifth Army HQ and demanded that two officers be shot as an example. In this draft Wynne suggested Gough had been overly ambitious to break through over a wide front, despite Haig's orders at the Doullens Conference (7 May 1917) to "wear down the enemy and have an objective" (the objectives in this case being Passchendaele–Staden Ridge and then the coast) and Haig restrained him. Wynne agreed that Haig had originally intended a breakthrough, but wrote that he had learned from Davidson that Haig had changed his mind after his meeting with the politicians (25 June), after which he had issued renewed orders (30 June) for Gough to "wear down the enemy" but "have an objective". Wynne argued that Gough had placed too much emphasis on the "objective" rather than the "wearing down".

Gough objected to this claim and said that Haig had told him to aim for a breakthrough at the 28 June conference. He also pointed out that a sleeper roadway earmarked for exploiting cavalry had been prepared long before he had been appointed to command the offensive and that appointing him (a "thruster") was evidence of Haig's desire for ambitious objectives. Gough also objected to Wynne's claim that he should have foreseen a wet August. In fact the weather seems to have broken unusually early that year.

After seeing Wynne's draft Gough claimed that Haig had been responsible for too narrow and weak an initial thrust and that Haig's "personal explanations" at the time urged Gough "to capture the Passchendaele Ridge and advance as rapidly as possible on Roulers (if possible on the first day)", which lay 40 miles (64 km) behind the German front line [actually 14 miles (23 km)] and thereafter on Ostend with the Fourth Army on the coast covering his left and "very definitely ... an attempt to break through and moreover Haig never altered this opinion until the attack was launched as far as I know. He confirmed this general idea on several occasions." Gough also scoffed at the implication that Haig had disapproved of his breakthrough attempt but had done nothing to stop it, and that even the corps commanders had warned of Gough's mistakes. Edmonds blamed the influence of Tavish Davidson on Wynne. Neill Malcolm, formerly Gough's chief of staff, called the 1943 draft "a farrago of malicious nonsense" (he objected particularly to Wynne's suggestion that Gough was allowed both to execute his attacks as he saw fit and to dictate to his corps commanders, without interference from Haig) and wrote that "Haig decided that he wanted a breakthrough and Charteris was always telling him that the Germans were on the verge of cracking. The breakthrough was the policy."

Gough denied that Haig had firmly told him to capture the Gheluveld Plateau over lunch on 28 June but it is in Haig's diary. He also accused Cavan of inventing a claim that he had begged Gough to let II Corps "bang through on the right" and a footnote to that effect was deleted from the History, although Cavan's claim is in fact confirmed by letters at the time; Percy Beddington, then GSO1 of a division, later chief of staff Fifth Army, later felt that Gough should have devoted a further two divisions to attacking the Gheluveld Plateau. Gough claimed that it was he who had realised the mistake.

Gough also criticised Haig for a poor choice of battlefield, "the worst possible for an offensive operation" – he said Haig should have attacked at Cambrai (Edmonds accepted that attacks of some kind were necessary and felt that Flanders was the best spot, contrary to Gough's opinion), for having a poor team around him (Charteris, Davidson, Lawrence, Kiggell) and for his top-down management style, claiming that Haig issued orders instead of gathering commanders and staff officers to thrash out the issues around a table. Gough also claimed that any entries in Haig's diary urging a step-by-step advance had been "written up after the event".

When told of Gough's criticisms Wynne wrote that "both Pilckem and Langemarck were thoroughly bad in their planning, and even the Official History should admit as much – and Gough must lump it. He should have been sacked for them without a pension." However, Wynne praised Gough's "gracious" admission that Haig had been wrong to select him to command the offensive, an admission which eventually appeared in the Official History. Another of the writing team, W. B. Wood, wrote (letter undated but probably in December 1944) that Gough "was at last getting his deserts" for having caused "disasters" by "adhering to his own plans for breaking the German lines over the whole of the Fifth Army front in preference to Haig's views".

There was then a further rewrite under the influence of Tavish Davidson, stressing Haig's involvement in the planning of the 31 July attacks. Edmonds ordered a further rewrite, at which point Norman Brook (future Cabinet Secretary) intervened and called a meeting as he felt Edmonds was exercising too much unfettered discretion over the tone of the History. Edmonds' "Reflections" blame Gough for "distant objectives" and ignoring Haig's advice to clear the Gheluveld Plateau first. The final version of the Official History suggests that Edmonds came to agree with Gough that Haig had been pushing for a breakthrough, rather than the limited offensive agreed by the War Cabinet. Edmonds repeatedly mentions how, throughout the Gough and Plumer periods, Haig hoped that the next major blow might cause the disintegration of the German opposition.

== Family and final years ==
Gough's son Valentine died in infancy shortly after his return from South Africa. He and his wife Mary (known as Daisy) then had four daughters: Myrtle Eleanore born 4 April 1904, Anne born 1906, Joyce born 6 November 1913, and Denise born 26 March 1916. Myrtle married Major Eric Adlhelm Torlogh Dutton, CMG, CBE, in 1936. Gough's wife died in March 1951.

In common with many generals of the era, Gough was a man of strong religious faith.

As late as 5 March 1951 Gough was writing to Edmonds to blame Tavish Davidson and Herbert Lawrence for their lack of influence over Haig's decision-making and claiming that he should have requested an interview with Haig prior to the March 1918 attack, and demanded to hold the bulk of his forces back from the front line, although he doubted that Haig would have agreed to give up ground voluntarily. His long battle for rehabilitation after his unjust dismissal deflected attention from his poor generalship in 1916 and 1917, and by World War Two he had come to be regarded as a military elder statesman. His reputation was also helped by his longevity, and during the revival of interest in the First World War from the late 1950s onwards, he was treated fairly mildly by Alan Clark and A. J. P. Taylor, not least because criticism was so increasingly focused on Douglas Haig. Gough published another volume of memoirs, Soldiering On, in 1954. The book contains a number of factual errors. In March 1963, shortly before his death, Gough was interviewed on television (the Tonight programme), using the opportunity to criticise his old nemesis Wilson.

== Death ==
Gough died in London on 18 March 1963 at the age of 92. He suffered from bronchial pneumonia for a month before his death occurred.

== Assessments ==
Gough was a man of whom there were extreme opinions; he was the only senior general who regularly visited forward trenches. He was the youngest of the Army Commanders by five years (the next-youngest was Birdwood, who briefly commanded Fifth Army in 1918). F. S. Oliver wrote that Gough brought "something of the nature of religious fervour into his profession". He is often described as having had a "peppery" personality. However, Captain Charles Carrington (Soldiers From the Wars Returning p. 104) recorded that Gough was very civil to him when he encountered him out riding.

=== Contemporary views ===
Boraston, in his strongly pro-Haig account (1922), wrote that Gough's performance on the Somme "amply justified the selection of this young but brilliant general" and wrote highly of Gough's performance during the semi-open warfare of early 1917, during the German withdrawal to the Hindenburg Line. Beddington described him as "a great commander" for his performance on the Somme. Liddell Hart (in a letter in 1954) wrote that Gough was "unlucky" to command under stalemate conditions and that in an earlier war, or World War Two, might have been "one of the outstanding figures in military history ... his performance was a lot better than was generally recognised". In the Official History Edmonds argued that under different circumstances Gough might have been a great leader in open warfare like "the late General Patton", and claimed that widespread opinion thought it a pity that an opportunity had been wasted that Gough was not in command of the cavalry at Cambrai.

Sir Charles Bonham-Carter, head of GHQ Training in 1917–18, argued that Gough "had greater qualities than any of the other Army Commanders" and had had the potential to be a great general, but was let down by a poor staff, and was too impatient to realise that infantry attacks needed "time to prepare".

Maj-Gen Sir Richard Bannatine-Allason wrote to Edmonds (in 1931) that Gough's "temperament did not suit him for command" and "found him full of nerves & hunting his subordinates". Simon Robbins suggests that the death of his brother in fighting on the Western Front in early 1915 may well have exacerbated Gough's latter personality traits during the conflict.

=== Modern historians ===
Gough's admiring biographer Anthony Farrar-Hockley pointed out that during the Battle of the Somme Gough had captured more difficult ground than Rawlinson, had taken more prisoners (17,723 as opposed to 15,630) but had suffered only half as many casualties (125,531 as opposed to 227,194). Farrar-Hockley also pointed out that not only did Gough not have enough artillery to succeed at Ypres in August 1917, but also argues that the limited advances advocated by "Tavish" Davidson were no cheaper in lives and did not stand any chance of achieving breakthrough or capturing German guns.

Simkins argues that Gough might have been more successful in the semi-open warfare of the Hundred Days. Gough was, in Philpott's view "probably the most discussed and vilified British Western Front general (after Haig at least) ... intelligent, quick witted and charming, a popular man in the army, both confident and courageous" although not popular with subordinates, and was "still learning his trade" in July 1916. However, Philpott concedes that he "interfered far too much" with his subordinates.

Prior & Wilson write of his command record on the Somme: "His grasp of the tactical situation ... seemed always limited, his dithering over the best way to capture Thiepval was disastrous for his troops, and his 'victory' at Beaumont Hamel much over-rated. His performance at the Somme should have seen him sink into a well-deserved obscurity. Perversely, in 1917, the opposite was to happen."

Historians tend to take an equally dim view of Gough's record at Third Ypres. Simpson writes that after the "more or less unsuccessful" operations on 10 and 16 August, Gough "in the end ... decided upon a more or less staggered approach, first one corps attacking and then another, which invited the sort of treatment the Germans had meted out to Fourth Army's piecemeal attacks the previous year. Throughout, though admittedly crippled by the weather, he failed to stick to the principles of careful preparation he had defined at the start of the planning for the offensive. While corps orders were as careful as before, the operations were doomed to fail". John Lee writes that "despite the atrocious rainfall Gough persisted in attacking through August in conditions that led to inevitable defeat and a severe loss of morale among the usually steady and reliable British infantry". Prior & Wilson simply describe Gough's August operations as "abysmal".

Ian Beckett (1999), building on Tim Travers' (1987) concept of a "command vacuum", argues that Gough's failings can in part be attributed to structural failings in the BEF chain of command, as officers grappled with the problems of commanding large formations under stalemate conditions, and the degree of initiative which should be permitted to subordinates. Gary Sheffield does not agree, and argues that before 1918 Gough's "poor performance at Third Ypres" masked the "tactical and operational improvements" which were being made.

Sheffield argues that Gough's overbearing behaviour, especially in 1916, may well have been a need to overcompensate for having been promoted at such a young age, over the heads of jealous colleagues (Gough admitted (The Fifth Army p. 94) that his rapid promotion brought "special difficulties" at Loos), many of whom mistrusted him because of the Curragh incident. He also argues that Gough "demonstrated a good deal of skill during the March (1918) retreat" and might have come into his own during the advances of the Hundred Days but that his "military vices outweighed his virtues" and "he was not the right man to command an Army on the Somme," although he blames Haig to some extent for not supervising him properly. In Sheffield's view, Archibald Wavell's later observation that Western Front operations were often conducted as "open warfare at the halt" (i.e. seeking to commit reserves to "break the enemy line" as opposed to careful siege operations) certainly applied to Gough's command at the Somme. "His inability to take direction, and his wholehearted and often unjustified confidence in his own planning, led him to overestimate his army's abilities and contributed to his disastrous operations at Bullecourt and Third Ypres". At Third Ypres his performance was "hopelessly optimistic" and "deeply disappointing". "Haig promoted and sustained (Gough) beyond his level of competence" although "arguably, while he deserved dismissal for his handling of the Somme, Bullecourt and Third Ypres, Gough was sacked for the one major battle in which he commanded Fifth Army with some competence".

Les Carlyon concurs that Gough was unfairly dealt with in 1918 but also regards his performance during the Great War in generally unflattering terms, citing documented and repeated failings in planning, preparation, comprehension of the battle space and a lack of empathy with the common soldier.

==== Execution of officer ====
Edmonds later wrote (to Wynne, 17 February 1944, during the period of the writing of the Third Ypres volume of the Official History) that he had heard Gough say that his men had "no blood lust" and that officers had "no spirit of the offensive", and that in 1918 he had once come into the mess demanding that two officers be shot pour encourager les autres, and despite being told by the APM (Assistant Provost Marshal) that there were no officers currently under arrest, "he got them". Nicholas Ridley comments that the suggestion that Gough effectively committed murder is, on the face of it, absurd and an example of the problems of relying on uncorroborated decades-old eyewitness testimony. However, it has been suggested that the story may have arisen from the execution of Sub-Lt Edwin Dyett in January 1917, for alleged desertion while serving with the Royal Naval Division at Beaucourt on 13 November 1916. Gough, overruling the Divisional Commander's recommendation for clemency, recommended that the execution proceed. (Note: Only around 10% of "death sentences" were carried out, often when "an example was made" of somebody, and with the final decision being taken by Douglas Haig himself after senior officers had expressed their opinion on the sentence as it passed up the chain of command. Dyett's execution became something of a cause celebre as he was one of only three commissioned officers executed for desertion during the war. See British Army during World War I.)

=== Fifth Army's "malaise" ===
Some put the blame for Fifth Army's performance on Gough's Chief of Staff Neill Malcolm, although his overbearing behaviour with Gough's subordinates may have been, even in the view of contemporaries, a variant on the "good-cop/bad-cop" routine. Edmonds also wrote in his memoirs (which are somewhat less reliable than the Official History) that Malcolm "accentuated and encouraged Gough's peculiarities, instead of softening them down" and claimed that in late 1917 William Peyton (Military Secretary) had warned Haig "three times that he was not only injuring himself but also injuring the cause by keeping Gough in command" but Haig was "perfectly infatuated with him". The situation worsened after Edward Beddington, who had been something of a buffer, left Fifth Army staff in 1917. Gough, in conversation with Liddell Hart and in The Fifth Army put some blame on Malcolm and also blamed himself for taking Malcolm with him on his inspection rounds, so that officers did not feel able to speak freely. Michael Howard, in his review of Farrar-Hockley's biography, commented that there was more to Fifth Army's "malaise" than that. Sheffield points out that this does not seem to have been Gough's view during the war and that Gough's problems began before Malcolm's arrival (e.g. at Loos) and continued after his removal. Watts of XIX Corps was the biggest victim of Malcolm. Farrar-Hockley argues that Gough was a popular figure until Bullecourt. Wilson's academic biographer Keith Jeffery describes Farrar-Hockley as "an unconvincing defence" of Gough.

Gough was notorious for his "encounters" with subordinates (Brigadier-General Sandilands to Edmonds, 1923). He was "looked on as a bit of a freak" (Brigadier-General Yatman to Edmonds, 1930). By late 1917 "no division wanted to go" to Fifth Army (Liddell Hart 1947) and most units looked on transfer to the Second Army (Plumer) with relief (Liddell Hart 1927). In The Fifth Army Gough acknowledged that there were some who hated coming into the Fifth Army, although he maintained that these were men lacking in boldness, resolution or energy. He wrote to Edmonds (18 March 1944) that "among the senior officers the spirit of energy, of resolution, & of initiative, was lamentably under-developed".

== Sources ==
- Beckett, Ian; Corvi, Steven (2006). Haig's Generals. Yorkshire: Pen & Sword. ISBN 978-1-84415-892-8.
- Blake, Robert (1952). The Private Papers of Douglas Haig. London: Eyre & Spottiswood. OCLC 469143587.
- Bond, Brian; Cave, Nigel (1999). Haig, a Reappraisal 70 Years On. Yorkshire: Leo Cooper. ISBN 0-85052-698-1.
- Callwell, C. E., Field Marshal Sir Henry Wilson, His Life and Times, Vol. II, London: Cassell, 1927
- Edmonds, J. (1991) [1948]. Military Operations France and Belgium 1917, Vol II. 7 June – 10 November. Messines and Third Ypres (Passchendaele). London: Imperial War Museum. ISBN 9780901627759.
- Edmonds, J. (1935). Military Operations France and Belgium 1918, Vol III. The German March Offensive and its Preliminaries (MacMillan 1935 ed.). London: MacMillan. OCLC 2660736.
- Farrar-Hockley, Anthony (1975). Goughie: the Life of General Sir Hubert Gough CBG, GCMG, KCVO. London: Hart-Davis, MacGibbon. ISBN 0-246-64059-6. OCLC 1527806.
- Green, Andrew (2003). Writing the Great War. London: Frank Cass. ISBN 0-7146-8430-9.
- Harris, J. P. (2009). Douglas Haig and the First World War. Cambridge: Cambridge University Press. ISBN 978-0-521-15877-0.
- Hart, P. (2006). The Somme. London: Cassell. ISBN 978-0-304-36735-1.
- Holmes, Richard (2004). The Little Field Marshal: A Life of Sir John French. Weidenfeld & Nicolson. ISBN 0-297-84614-0.
- James, Lawrence (1993). Imperial Warrior: the Life and Times of Field-Marshal Viscount Allenby 1861–1936. London: Weidenfeld & Nicolson. ISBN 0-297-81152-5.
- Jeffery, Keith (2006). Field Marshal Sir Henry Wilson: A Political Soldier. Oxford University Press. ISBN 978-0-19-820358-2.
- Kitchen, Martin (2001). The German Offensives of 1918. Stroud: Tempus. ISBN 0-7524-1799-1.
- Lloyd, Nick (2006). Loos 1915. Stroud: The History Press. ISBN 978-0-7524-4676-9.
- Philpott, W. (2009). Bloody Victory: The Sacrifice on the Somme and the Making of the Twentieth Century (1st ed.). London: Little, Brown. ISBN 978-1-4087-0108-9.
- Powell, Geoffrey (1990). Plumer, the Soldier's General (2004 ed.). Pen & Sword Yorkshire. ISBN 1-84415-039-9.
- Prior, Robin (2004) [1992]. Command on the Western Front: The Military Career of Sir Henry Rawlinson 1914–1918. Leo Cooper. ISBN 1-84415-103-4.
- Prior, Robin; Wilson, Trevor (1996). Passchendaele, the Untold Story. Yale. ISBN 0-30007227-9.
- Prior, R.; Wilson, T. (2005). The Somme. Yale University Press. ISBN 0-300-10694-7.
- Ridley, Nicholas (2024). Far from Suitable? Haig, Gough and Passchendaele: a Reappraisal. Helion. ISBN 978-1915113658.
- Robbins, Simon (2005). British Generalship on the Western Front. Abingdon: Routledge. ISBN 0-415-40778-8.
- Shaw Sparrow, W. (1921). The Fifth Army in March 1918. London: The Bodley Head. OCLC 878235583.
- Sheffield, Gary; Todman, Dan (2004). Command and Control on the Western Front. Stroud: Spellmount. ISBN 978-1-86227-420-4.
- Sheffield, Gary; Bourne, John (2005). Douglas Haig Diaries and Letters 1914–18. London: Phoenix. ISBN 978-0-297-84702-1.
- Sheffield, Gary (2011). The Chief. London: Aurum Press. ISBN 978-1-84513-691-8.
- Simpson, Andy (2006). Directing Operations: British Corps Command on the Western Front 1914–18. Stroud: Spellmount. ISBN 978-1-86227-292-7.
- Travers, Tim (1987). The Killing Ground: The British Army, The Western Front and The Emergence of Modern War 1900–1918. London: Allen & Unwin. ISBN 0-85052-964-6.
- United Kingdom National Archives, Internet Site
- Walker, J. (1998). The Blood Tub, General Gough and the Battle of Bullecourt, 1917 (Spellmount 2000 ed.). Charlottesville, Va: Howell Press. ISBN 1-86227-022-8.
- Woodward, D. R. (1998). Field Marshal Sir William Robertson. Westport Connecticut & London: Praeger. ISBN 0-275-95422-6.

Theses

- Simpson, A. (2001). The Operational Role of British Corps Command on the Western Front 1914–18 (PhD) (online ed.). London: London University. OCLC 53564367. uk.bl.ethos.367588.

== Works ==
- Gough, Hubert, A Living Memorial to the Men of the Fifth Army, London: Fifth Army Memorial Fund, 1916
- Gough, Hubert, Bullying the Baltic States, Manchester: Hands-off Russia Committee, 1920
- Sparrow, Walter Shaw, & Hubert Gough, The Fifth Army in March 1918, London: Bodley Head, 1921
- Gough, Hubert, The Fifth Army, London: Hodder, 1931
- Gough, Hubert, The March Retreat, London: Cassell, 1934
- Gough, Hubert, Soldiering On: Being the memoirs of Sir Hubert Gough, New York: Speller, 1957

Military offices
Preceded by Sir Thompson Capper	GOC 7th Division; April–July 1915	Succeeded by Sir Thompson Capper
Preceded by Charles Monro	GOC I Corps; 1915–1916	Succeeded by Arthur Holland
Preceded by None	GOC-in-C Fifth Army; 1916–1918	Succeeded by William Peyton
Honorary titles
Preceded by Edmund Allenby, 1st Viscount Allenby	Colonel of the 16th/5th Lancers; 1936–1943	Succeeded by Henry Cecil Lloyd Howard
