= Reginald Mortimer Howgego =

- Born: 1896
- Died: 1980 (aged 83–84)
- Military career
- Allegiance: United Kingdom
- Branch: (British Raj) British Indian Army (1914–1927)
- Rank: Sergeant
- Units: London Regiment; 25th Cyclist Battalion
- Known for: Crawling Order photography
- Conflicts: First World War; North-West Frontier
- Awards: India General Service Medal (1908)

Reginald Mortimer Howgego (1896 – 1980), was a British Indian Army officer, and sergeant serving the 25th Cyclist Battalion, known for his photographs, and holding a picket at one end of Kucha Kaurianwala, Amritsar, in April 1919, at the instruction for Indians to crawl by Reginald Dyer, following the assault of Marcella Sherwood, and the Jallianwalla Bagh Massacre.

== Early life ==
Reginald Howgego was born in 1896, one of at least four children of Harry Arthur Howgego, a printer's compositor, and his wife Laura Elizabeth.

== Military career ==
Howgego enlisted into the army at the age of 19 during the First World War. He joined the 25th Cyclist Battalion, a bicycle battalion of the London Regiment. He saw action at the North-West Frontier.

=== Photography ===
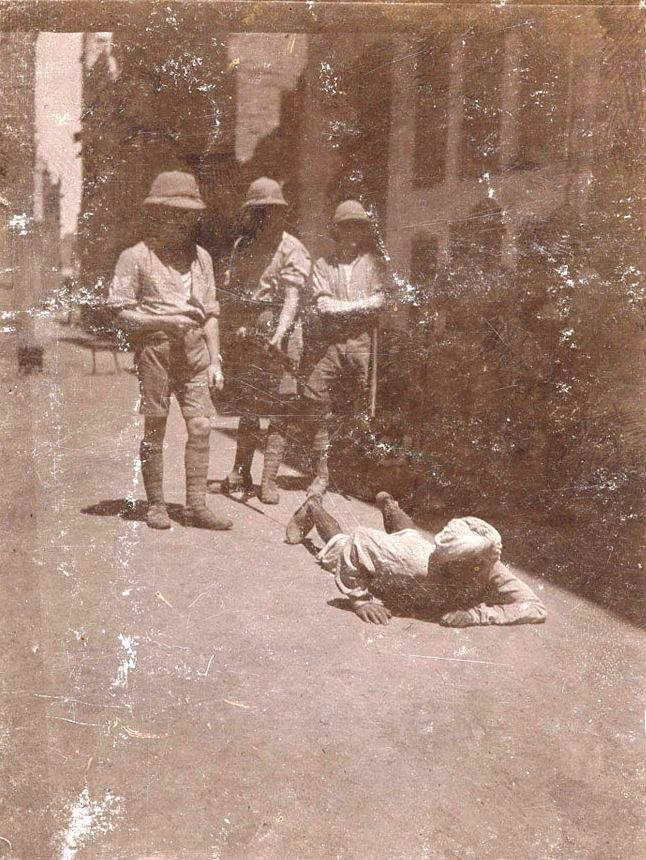
An Indian crawling up street where Sherwood was assaulted, 1919.

Howgego became known for his photography, taken possibly using a Vest Pocket Kodak. In 1917, while stationed on the NW Frontier, he sent several photographs of soldiers and civilans to his mother. His images include those of the Kalka–Shimla Railway, and Darra Pezu, Waziristan.

In 1919 Howgego was present at Amritsar with Reginald Dyer. During April 1919, with the 25th Cyclist Battalion, he held a picket at one end of Kucha Kaurianwala, Amritsar, as Indians were forced to crawl on the orders of Dyer, following the assault on Marcella Sherwood on 10 April and Jallianwala Bagh Massacre of 13 April. At least four photographs were taken at Kucha Kaurianwala between 19 and 24 April 1919. One of these photographs, captioned "Punishment", shows soldiers enforcing the crawling order. Another image, captioned "Making a Native Crawl down the Street as Punishment", shows a soldier prodding a crawling individual. The whipping post, appearing in the corner of that picture also appears on its own in another photograph. Other photographs are of his soldiers resting at Ram Bagh, and one of eight "happy and relaxed" officers sitting at a picket site.

== Awards ==
In 1921, for his service on the NW Frontier, Howgego was awarded the India General Service Medal (1908), inscribed with "Afghanistan, North West Frontier 1908".

== Later life ==
In later life, Howgego retired to Ipswich, from where he wrote several letters to historians, newspapers, and the BBC. To historian Alfred Draper, he gave his opinion of Reginald Dyer as "a first class soldier condemned by people at home who knew nothing of India, his troops would have done anything and gone anywhere with him". In the Sunday Express, he took issue with a passage in Jan Morris’s Pax Britannica that stated hundreds of innocent Indian civilians had been killed. He preferred the narrative published in The Morning Post, which favoured Dyer.

== Bibliography ==
- Wagner, Kim A. (2019). Amritsar 1919: An Empire of Fear & the Making of a Massacre. Yale University Press. ISBN 978-0-300-24546-2.
