= Ayyappa (disambiguation) =

Ayyappan is the god of growth in Hinduism.

Ayyappa may also refer to:

- Ayyappa Paniker, an Indian writer
- Ayyappa Masagi, an Indian activist
- Ayyappa Nagar, a residential area in Chennai
- Ayyappa Nayakan Pettai, a village in Tamil Nadu
- Subbanna Ayyappan (1955–2025), Indian fisheries scientist and agricultural research administrator

== See also ==
- Swami Ayyappan (disambiguation)
