= Jallianwala Bagh massacre =

1919 massacre of Indian protesters

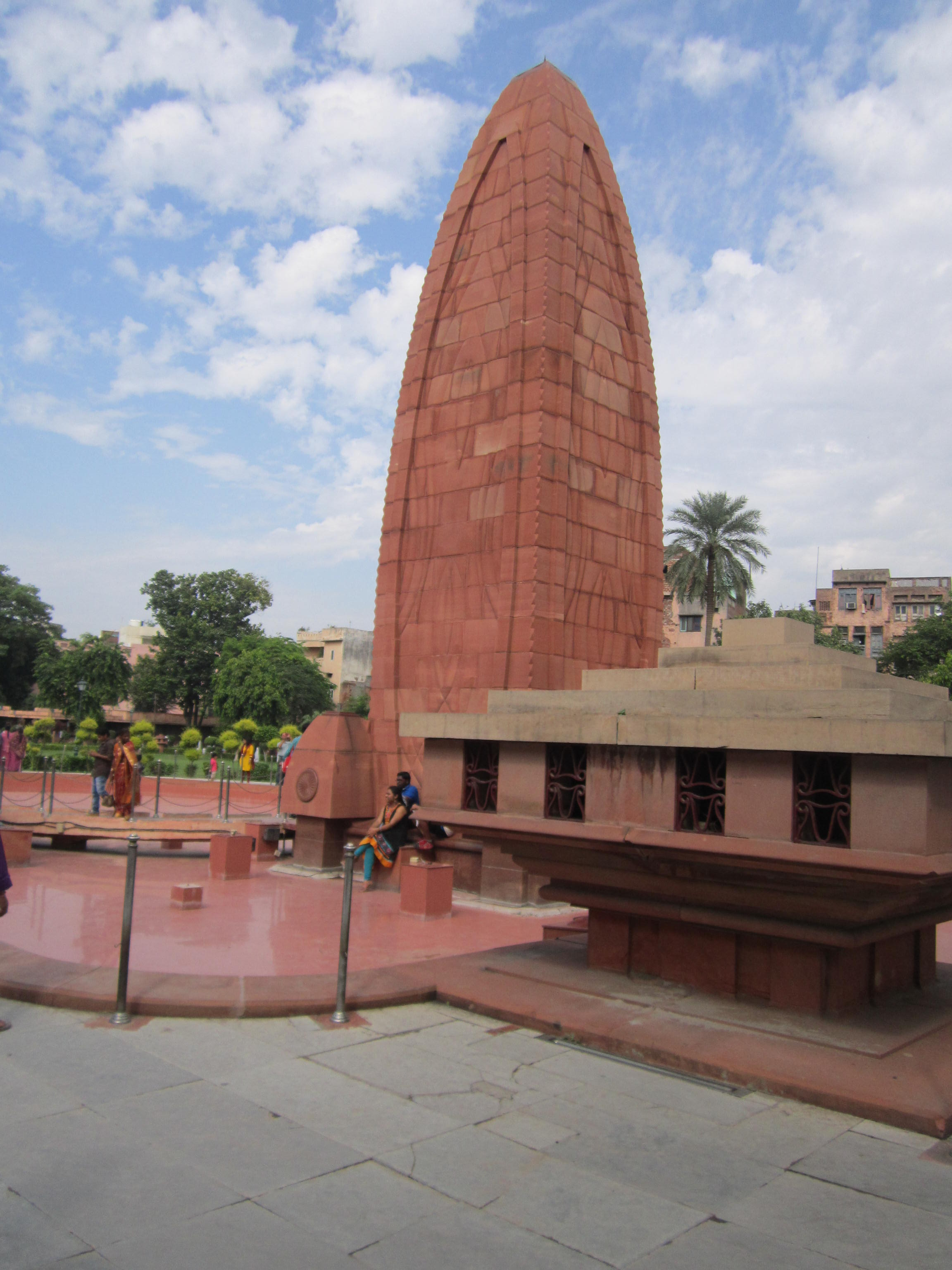
- Martyrs' memorial in Jallianwala Bagh

- Location of Amritsar in Punjab
- Location: 31°37′14″N 74°52′50″E; Amritsar, Punjab, British India (present-day Punjab, India)
- Date: 13 April 1919; 107 years ago Evening
- Target: Crowd of nonviolent protesters, along with Baisakhi pilgrims, who had gathered in Jallianwala Bagh, Amritsar
- Attack type: Massacre, mass shooting
- Weapon: Lee-Enfield rifles
- Deaths: 379 – 700
- Injuries: ~ 1,500
- Perpetrators: British Indian Army: Brig.-Gen. R. E. H. Dyer, in charge of 51 soldiers of the 9th Gurkha Rifles and 54th Sikhs

The Jallianwala Bagh massacre (IPA: [dʒəlɪjãːʋaːlaː baːɣ, baːɡ]), also known as the Amritsar massacre, took place on 13 April 1919. A large crowd had gathered at the Jallianwala Bagh in Amritsar, Punjab, British India, during the annual Baisakhi fair to protest against the Rowlatt Act and the arrest of pro-Indian independence activists Saifuddin Kitchlew and Satyapal. In response to the public gathering, Brigadier-General Reginald Dyer surrounded the people with Gurkhas of Nepalese origin and Sikh infantrymen of the British Indian Army. (Note: Some sources state that the third regiment involved in the massacre was the 59th Scinde Rifles.)

The Jallianwala Bagh could only be exited on one side, as its other three sides were enclosed by buildings. After blocking the exit with his troops, Dyer ordered them to shoot at the crowd, continuing to fire even as the protestors tried to flee. The troops kept on firing until their ammunition was low and they were ordered to stop. Estimates of those killed vary from 379 to 1,500 or more people; over 1,200 others were injured, of whom 192 sustained serious injury. Britain has never formally apologised for the massacre, but expressed deep "regret" in 2019.

The massacre caused a re-evaluation by the Imperial British military of its role when confronted with civilians to use "minimal force whenever possible" (although the British Army was not directly involved in the massacre; the British Indian Army was a separate organisation). However, in the light of later British military actions during the Mau Mau rebellion in the Kenya Colony, historian Huw Bennett has pointed out that this new policy was not always followed. The army was retrained with less violent tactics for crowd control.

The level of casual brutality and the lack of any accountability stunned the entire nation, resulting in a wrenching loss of faith of the general Indian public in the intentions of the United Kingdom. The attack was condemned by the Secretary of State for War, Winston Churchill, as "unutterably monstrous", and in the UK House of Commons debate on 8 July 1920 Members of Parliament voted 247 to 37 against Dyer. The ineffective inquiry, together with the initial accolades for Dyer, fuelled great widespread anger against the British among the Indian populace, leading to the non-cooperation movement of 1920–22.

== Background ==
=== Defence of India Act ===
During World War I, British India contributed to the British war effort by providing men and resources. Millions of Indian soldiers and labourers served in Europe, Africa, and the Middle East, while both the Indian administration and the princes sent large supplies of food, money, and ammunition. Bengal and Punjab remained sources of anti-colonial activities. Revolutionary attacks in Bengal, associated increasingly with disturbances in Punjab, were enough to nearly paralyse the regional administration. Of these, a pan-Indian mutiny in the British Indian Army planned for February 1915 was the most prominent amongst a number of plots formulated between 1914 and 1917 by Indian nationalists in India, the United States and Germany.

The planned February mutiny was ultimately thwarted when British intelligence infiltrated the Ghadar Movement, arresting key figures. Mutinies in smaller units and garrisons within India were also crushed. In the context of the British war effort and the threat from the separatist movement in India, the Defence of India Act 1915 was passed, limiting civil and political liberties. Michael O'Dwyer, then the Lieutenant Governor of Punjab, was one of the strongest proponents of the act, in no small part due to the Ghadarite threat in the province.

=== The Rowlatt Act ===
The costs of the protracted war in money and manpower were great. High casualty rates in the war, increasing inflation after the end, compounded by heavy taxation, the deadly 1918 flu pandemic, and the disruption of trade during the war escalated human suffering in India. The pre-war Indian nationalist sentiment was revived as moderate and extremist groups of the Indian National Congress ended their differences to unify. In 1916, the Congress was successful in establishing the Lucknow Pact, a temporary alliance with the All-India Muslim League. British political concessions and Whitehall's India Policy after World War I began to change, with the passage of Montagu–Chelmsford Reforms, which initiated the first round of political reform in the Indian subcontinent in 1917. However, this was deemed insufficient in reforms by the Indian political movement. Mahatma Gandhi, recently returned to India, began emerging as an increasingly charismatic leader under whose leadership civil disobedience movements grew rapidly as an expression of political unrest.

The recently crushed Ghadar conspiracy, the presence of Raja Mahendra Pratap's Kabul mission in Afghanistan (with possible links to Bolshevik Russia), and a still-active revolutionary movement especially in Punjab and Bengal (as well as worsening civil unrest throughout India) led to the appointment of a sedition committee in 1918 chaired by Sidney Rowlatt, an Anglo-Egyptian judge. It was tasked to evaluate German and Bolshevik links to the militant movement in India, especially in Punjab and Bengal. On the recommendations of the committee, the Rowlatt Act, an extension of the Defence of India Act 1915 to limit civil liberties, was enacted.

The passage of the Rowlatt Act in 1919 caused large-scale political unrest throughout India. Ominously, in 1919, the Third Anglo-Afghan War began in the wake of Amir Habibullah's assassination and the institution of Amanullah Khan in his place. As a reaction to the Rowlatt Act, Muhammad Ali Jinnah resigned from his Bombay seat, writing in a letter to the Viceroy, "I, therefore, as a protest against the passing of the Bill and the manner in which it was passed tender my resignation ... a Government that passes or sanctions such a law in times of peace forfeits its claim to be called a civilised government". Gandhi's call for protest against the Rowlatt Act achieved an unprecedented response of furious unrest and protests.

== Before the massacre ==
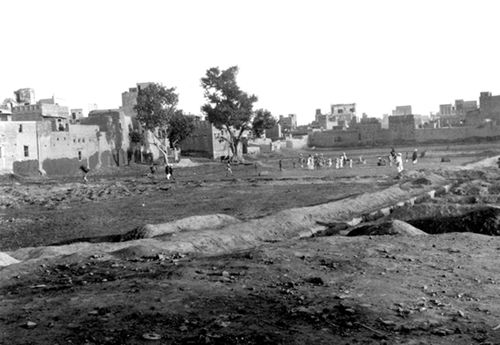
The Jallianwalla Bagh in 1919, months after the massacre

Especially in Punjab, the situation was deteriorating rapidly, with disruptions of rail, telegraph, and communication systems. The movement was at its peak before the end of the first week of April, with some recording that "practically the whole of Lahore was on the streets, the immense crowd that passed through Anarkali Bazaar was estimated to be around 20,000". Many officers in the Indian army believed revolt was possible, and they prepared for the worst. The British Lieutenant-Governor of Punjab, Michael O'Dwyer, is said to have believed that these were the early and ill-concealed signs of a conspiracy for a coordinated revolt planned around May, on the lines of the 1857 revolt, at a time when British troops would have withdrawn to the hills for the summer.

The Amritsar massacre, and other events at about the same time, have been described by some historians as the result of a concerted plan by the Punjab administration to suppress such a conspiracy. James Houssemayne Du Boulay is said to have posited a direct causal relationship between the fear of a Ghadarite uprising in the midst of an increasingly tense situation in Punjab, and the British response that ended in the massacre.

On 10 April 1919, there was a protest at the residence of Miles Irving, the Deputy Commissioner of Amritsar. The demonstration was to demand the release of two popular leaders of the Indian Independence Movement, Satyapal and Saifuddin Kitchlew, who had been arrested by the government and moved to a secret location. Both were proponents of the Satyagraha movement led by Gandhi. A military picket shot at the crowd, killing several protesters and setting off a series of violent events. Riotous crowds carried out arson attacks on British banks, killed several British people and assaulted two British women.

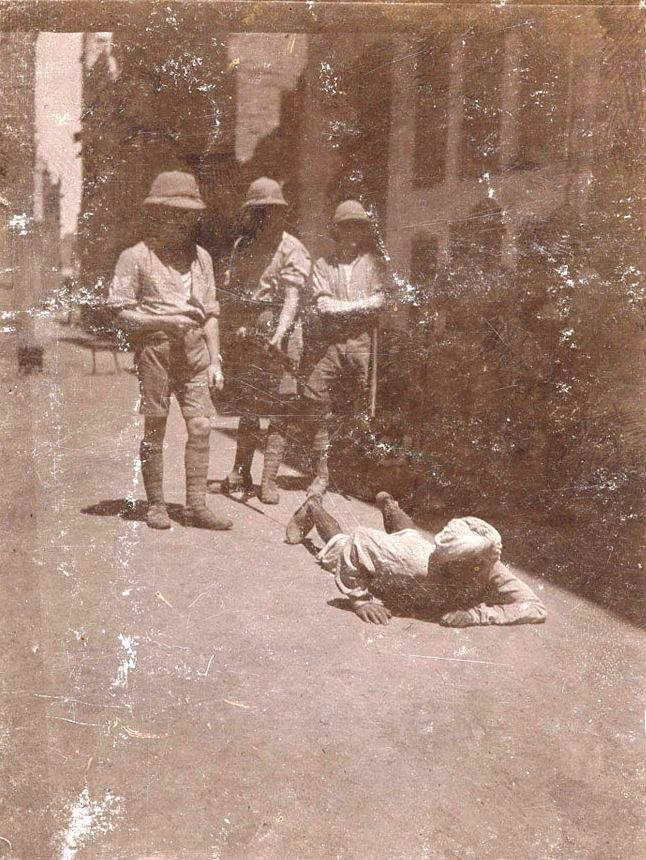
All native men were forced to crawl the Kucha Kurrichhan on their hands and knees as punishment, 1919

On 11 April, Marcella Sherwood, a 40-year-old English missionary, fearing for the safety of the approximately 600 Indian children under her care, was on her way to shut the schools and send the children home. While travelling through a narrow street called the Kucha Kurrichhan, she was caught by a mob who violently attacked her. She was rescued by some local Indians, including the father of one of her pupils, who hid her from the mob and then smuggled her to the safety of Gobindgarh Fort. After visiting Sherwood on 19 April, the local commander of Indian Army forces, Brigadier General Dyer, enraged at the assault, issued an order requiring every Indian man using that street to crawl its length on his hands and knees as a punishment. Dyer later explained to a British inspector: "Some Indians crawl face downwards in front of their gods. I wanted them to know that a British woman is as sacred as a Hindu god and therefore they have to crawl in front of her, too." He also authorised the indiscriminate public whipping of locals who came within lathi length of a police officer. Marcella Sherwood later defended Dyer, describing him as "the saviour of the Punjab".

For the next two days, the city of Amritsar was quiet, but violence continued in other parts of Punjab. Railway lines were cut, telegraph posts destroyed, government buildings burnt, and three Europeans murdered. By 13 April, the British government had decided to put most of Punjab under martial law. The legislation restricted a number of civil liberties, including freedom of assembly; gatherings of more than four people were banned.

On the evening of 12 April, the leaders of the hartal in Amritsar held a meeting at the Hindu College–Dhab Khatikan. At the meeting, Hans Raj, an aide to Kitchlew, announced a public protest meeting would be held at 16:30 the following day in the Jallianwala Bagh, to be organised by Muhammad Bashir and chaired by a senior and respected Congress Party leader, Lal Kanhyalal Bhatia. A series of resolutions protesting against the Rowlatt Act, the recent actions of the British authorities and the detention of Satyapal and Kitchlew was drawn up and approved, after which the meeting adjourned.

== The massacre ==
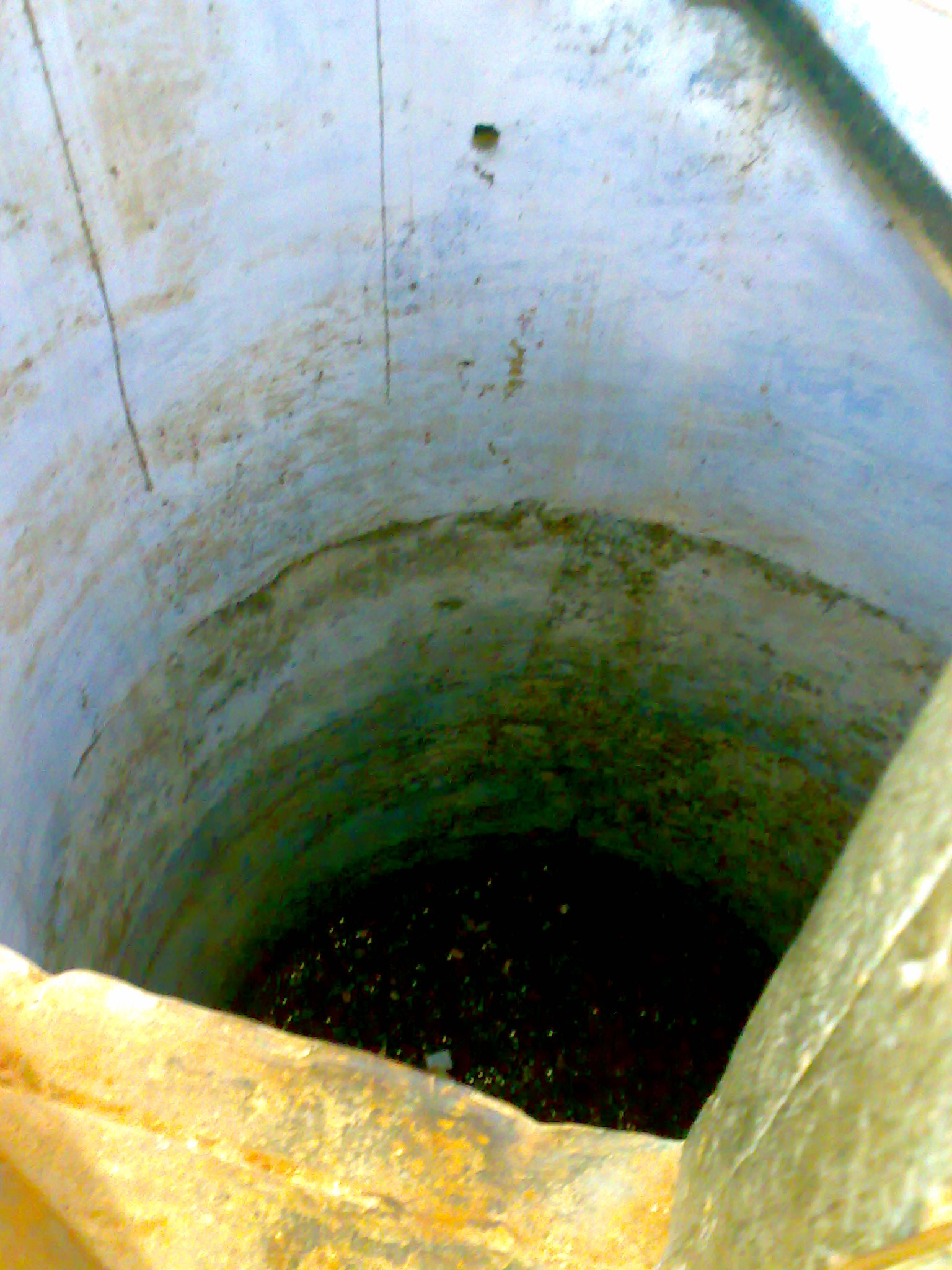
The Martyrs' Well, at Jallianwala Bagh. 120 bodies were recovered from this well as per inscription on it.

On Sunday, 13 April 1919, Dyer, convinced a major insurrection could take place, banned all meetings. This notice was not widely disseminated, and many villagers gathered in the Bagh to celebrate the Baisakhi festival and to peacefully protest against the arrest and deportation of two national leaders, Satyapal and Saifuddin Kitchlew.

At 09:00 on the morning of 13 April 1919, the traditional festival of Baisakhi, Dyer proceeded through Amritsar with several city officials, announcing the implementation of a pass system to enter or leave the city, a curfew beginning at 20:00 that night, and a ban on all processions and public meetings of four or more persons. The proclamation was read and explained in English, Urdu, Hindi, and Punjabi, but many either paid it no heed or learned of it only later. Meanwhile, local police had received intelligence of the planned meeting in the Jallianwala Bagh through word of mouth and plainclothes detectives in the crowds. Dyer was informed of the meeting at 12:40 and returned to his base at around 13:30 to decide how to handle it.

By mid-afternoon, thousands of Indians had gathered in the Jallianwala Bagh (garden) near the Harmandir Sahib in Amritsar. Many who were present had been worshipping earlier at the Golden Temple and were merely passing through the Bagh on their way home. The Bagh was (and remains today) an open area of 6–7 acres (2.4–2.8 ha), roughly 200 by 200 yards (180 m × 180 m) in size, and surrounded on all sides by walls roughly 10 feet (3.0 m) in height. Balconies of houses three to four stories tall overlooked the Bagh, and five narrow entrances opened onto it, several with lockable gates. Although it was planted with crops during the rainy season, for much of the rest of the year it served as a local meeting place and recreation area. In the centre of the Bagh was a samadhi (cremation site) and a large well partly filled with water which measured about 20 feet (6.1 m) in diameter.

Apart from the pilgrims passing through, Amritsar had filled up over the preceding days with farmers, traders and merchants who were attending the annual Baisakhi horse and cattle fair. Because the city police closed the fair at 14:00 that afternoon, many of those who had been attending it drifted into the Jallianwala Bagh, further increasing the number of people who happened to be there when the massacre began.

Dyer arranged for an aeroplane to overfly the Bagh and estimate the size of the crowd, which he reported was about 6,000; however, the Hunter Commission estimates that a crowd of between 10,000 and 20,000 had assembled by the time Dyer arrived. Dyer and Deputy Commissioner Miles Irving, the senior civil authority for Amritsar, took no actions to prevent the crowds from assembling or to disperse them peacefully. This would later be a serious criticism levelled at both Dyer and Irving.

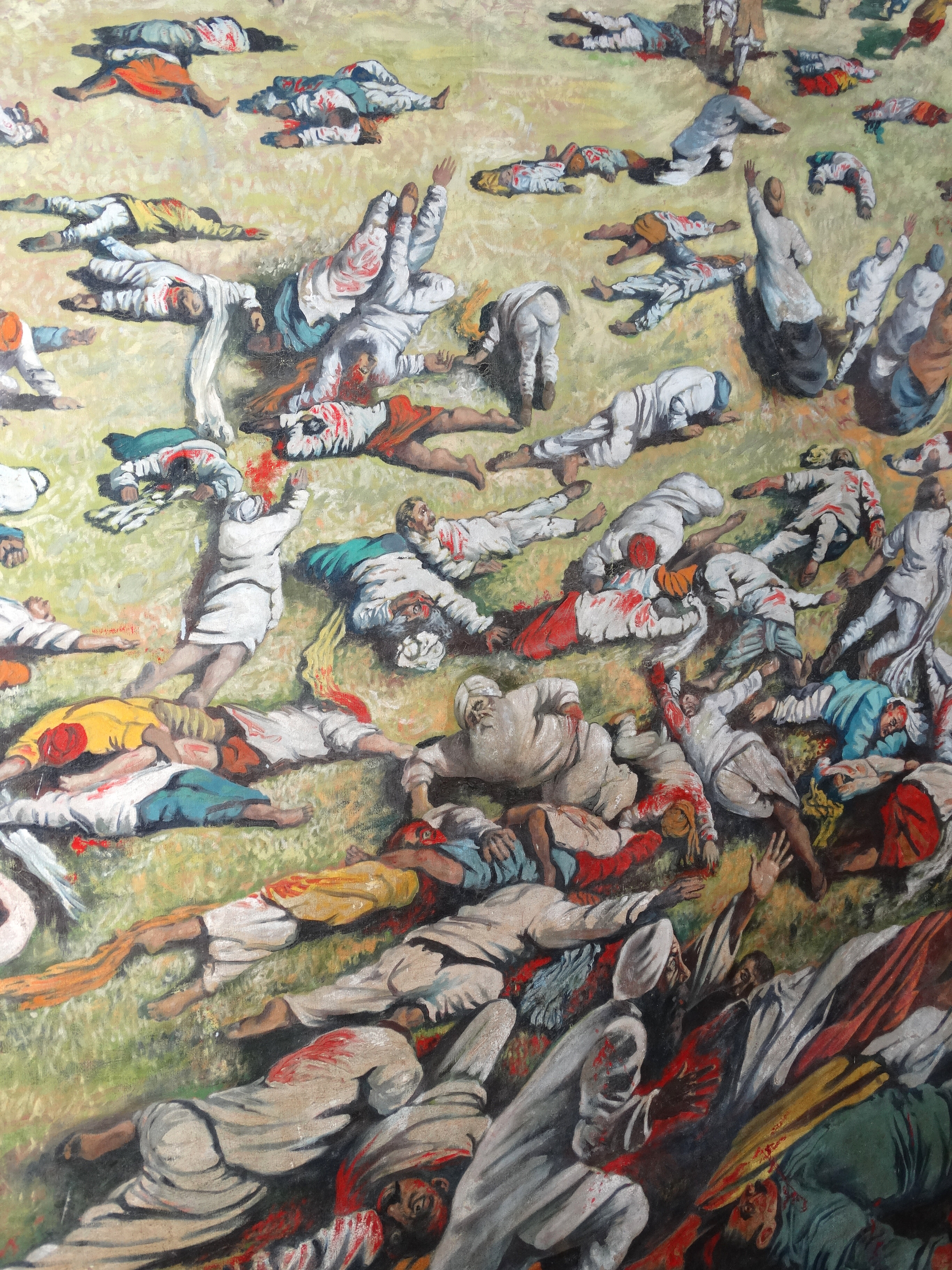
Mural depicting 1919 Amritsar massacre

An hour after the meeting began as scheduled at 17:30, Dyer arrived at the Bagh with a group of 50 troops. All fifty were armed with .303 Lee–Enfield bolt-action rifles. Dyer may have specifically chosen troops from the Gurkha and Sikh ethnic groups due to their proven loyalty to the British. He had also brought two armoured cars armed with machine guns; however, the vehicles could not enter the compound through the narrow entrances. The Jallianwala Bagh was surrounded on all sides by houses and buildings and had only five narrow entrances, most of which were kept permanently locked. The main entrance was relatively wide, but was guarded heavily by the troops backed by the armoured vehicles so as to prevent anyone from getting out.

Without warning the crowd to disperse, Dyer ordered his troops to block the main exits and begin shooting toward the densest sections of the crowd in front of the available narrow exits, where panicked crowds were trying to leave the Bagh. Firing continued for approximately ten minutes. Unarmed civilians, including men, women, elderly people and children were killed. A cease-fire was ordered after the troops fired about one third of their ammunition. He stated later that the purpose of this action "was not to disperse the meeting but to punish the Indians for disobedience."

The following day Dyer stated in a report, "I have heard that between 200 and 300 of the crowd were killed. My party fired 1,650 rounds". Apart from the many deaths that resulted directly from the shooting, a number of people died by being crushed in the stampedes at the narrow gates or by jumping into the solitary well on the compound to escape the shooting. A plaque, placed at the site after independence, states that 120 bodies were removed from the well. Dyer imposed a curfew time that was earlier than usual; as a result, the wounded could not be moved from where they had fallen and many of them therefore died of their wounds during the night.

== Casualties ==
The number of total casualties is disputed. The following morning's newspapers quoted an erroneous initial figure of 200 casualties, offered by the Associated Press, e.g.,

"News has been received from the Punjab that the Amritsar mob has again broken out in a violent attack against the authorities. The rebels were repulsed by the military and they suffered 200 casualties."

— The Times of India, 14 April 1919

The Government of Punjab, criticised by the Hunter Commission for not gathering accurate figures, only offered the same approximate figure of 200. When interviewed by the members of the committee a senior civil servant in Punjab admitted that the actual figure could be higher. The Sewa Samiti society independently carried out an investigation and reported 379 deaths, and 192 seriously wounded. The Hunter Commission based their figures of 379 deaths, and approximately 3 times that number injured, suggesting 1,500 casualties. At the meeting of the Imperial Legislative Council held on 12 September 1919, the investigation led by Pandit Madan Mohan Malviya concluded that there were 42 boys among the dead, the youngest of them only 7 months old. The Hunter commission confirmed the deaths of 337 men, 41 boys and a six-week-old baby.

In July 1919, three months after the massacre, officials were tasked with finding who had been killed by inviting inhabitants of the city to volunteer information about those who had died. This information was incomplete due to fear that those who participated would be identified as having been present at the meeting, and some of the dead may not have had close relations in the area.

Historian Vishwa Nath Datta estimated 700 killed.

Madan Mohan Malaviya estimated 1000 killed.

Winston Churchill reported nearly 400 slaughtered, and three or four times the number wounded to the Westminster Parliament, on 8 July 1920.

Since the official figures were obviously flawed regarding the size of the crowd (6,000–20,000), the number of rounds fired and the period of shooting, the Indian National Congress instituted a separate inquiry of its own, with conclusions that differed considerably from the British Government's inquiry. The casualty number quoted by the Congress was more than 1,500, with approximately 1,000 being killed.

Indian nationalist Swami Shraddhanand wrote to Gandhi of 1,500 deaths in the incident.

The British Government tried to suppress information of the massacre, but news spread in India and widespread outrage ensued; details of the massacre did not become known in Britain until December 1919.

== Aftermath ==
This event caused many moderate Indians to abandon their previous loyalty to the British and become nationalists distrustful of British rule.

Dyer reported to his superiors that he had been "confronted by a revolutionary army", to which Major General William Beynon replied via telegram: "Your action correct and Lieutenant Governor approves." O'Dwyer requested that martial law should be imposed upon Amritsar and other areas, and this was granted by Viceroy Lord Chelmsford. Thousands were detained in the subsequent days, some being sentenced to penal transportation. According to historian Harish Puri, at least 115 people were killed by security forces in the days after 13 April.

Both Secretary of State for War Winston Churchill and former Prime Minister H. H. Asquith, however, openly condemned the attack, Churchill referring to it as "unutterably monstrous" and Asquith calling it "one of the worst, most dreadful, outrages in the whole of our history". In the House of Commons debate of 8 July 1920, Churchill said, "The crowd was unarmed, except with bludgeons. It was not attacking anybody or anything ... When fire had been opened upon it to disperse it, it tried to run away. Pinned up in a narrow place considerably smaller than Trafalgar Square, with hardly any exits, and packed together so that one bullet would drive through three or four bodies, the people ran madly this way and the other. When the fire was directed upon the centre, they ran to the sides. The fire was then directed to the sides. Many threw themselves down on the ground, the fire was then directed down on the ground. This was continued to 8 to 10 minutes, and it stopped only when the ammunition had reached the point of exhaustion."

After Churchill's speech in the House of Commons debate, MPs voted 247 to 37 against Dyer and in support of the Government. Cloake reports that despite the official rebuke, many Britons still "thought him a hero for saving the rule of British law in India."

Rabindranath Tagore received the news of the massacre by 22 May 1919. He tried to arrange a protest meeting in Calcutta and finally decided to renounce his British knighthood as "a symbolic act of protest". In the repudiation letter, dated 31 May 1919 and addressed to the Viceroy of India, Lord Chelmsford, he wrote "I ... wish to stand, shorn, of all special distinctions, by the side of those of my countrymen who, for their so called insignificance, are liable to suffer degradation not fit for human beings."

"The enormity of the measures taken by the Government in Punjab for quelling some local disturbances has, with a rude shock, revealed to our minds the helplessness of our position as British subjects in India ... [T]he very least that I can do for my country is to take all consequences upon myself in giving voice to the protest of the millions of my countrymen, surprised into dumb anguish of terror. The time has come when badges of honour make our shame glaring in the incongruous context of humiliation ..."

— English Writings of Rabindranath Tagore Miscellaneous Writings Vol # 8

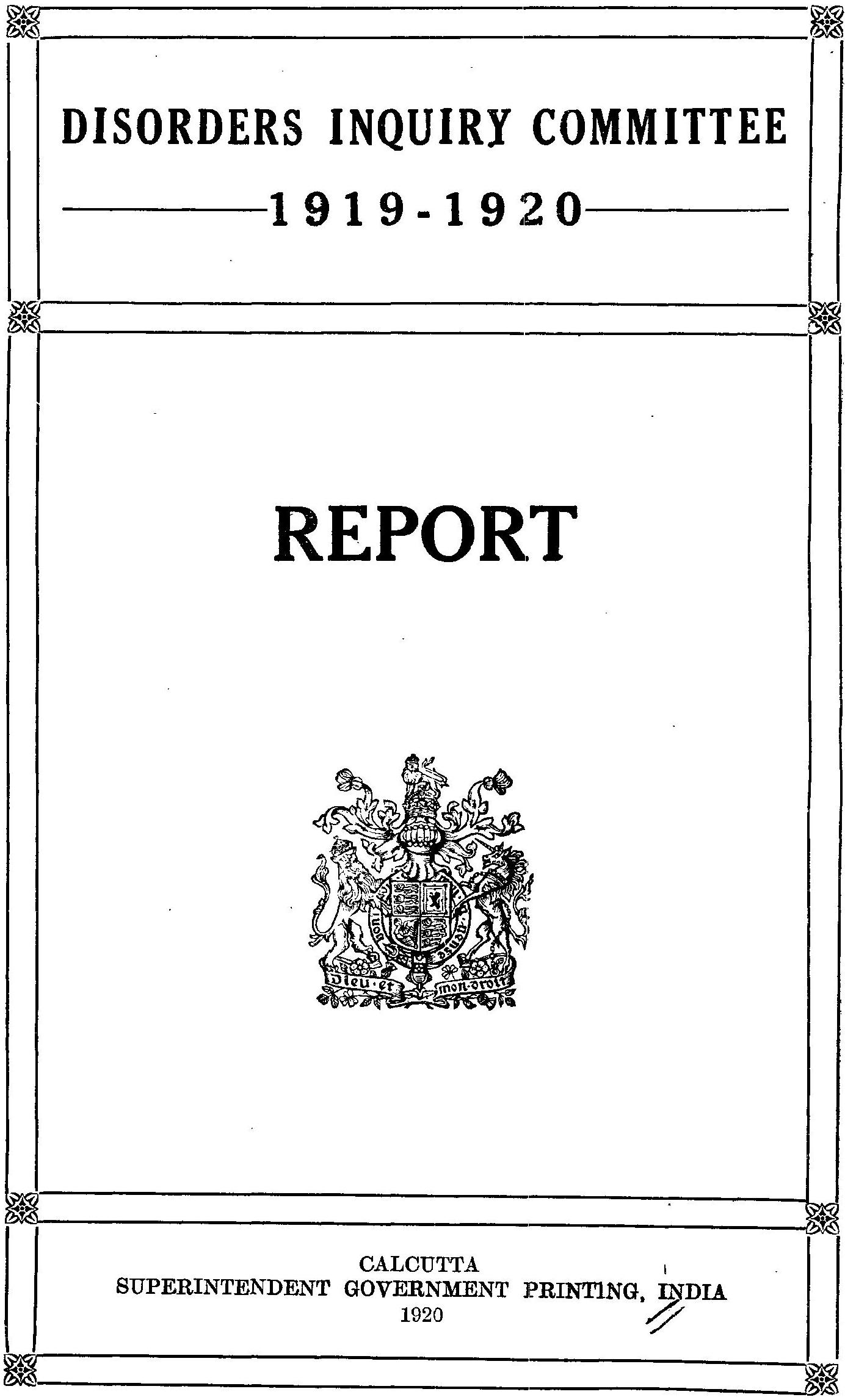
Disorders Inquiry Committee 1919–1920 (report) Calcutta- Superintendent Government Printing, India 1920

=== Dyer's response and motivation ===
Dyer wrote an article in the Globe of 21 January 1921, entitled, "The Peril to the Empire". It commenced with "India does not want self-government. She does not understand it." Dyer wrote later that:

...There should be an eleventh commandment in India - "Thou shalt not agitate'. All that the cultivator and the factory worker want is just and clear laws applicable to all alike. He does not always know why his passions have been roused and whether he is being misled, who is there to tell him but the Sahib? And now it seems that the Sahib is not allowed to tell him. He does not want an exchange of rulers...

...India will not be desirous or capable of self-government for generations, and when self-government does come, it will not be the leaders of revolt who will rule. The very names of most of the extremists smell in the nostrils of Indian manhood... ...Self-government for India is a horrible pretence which would set the people of the country at each other's throats long before the beginnings of constructive work were made possible. Under self-government, India would commit suicide; but our politicians would be guilty of murder as associates in the crime...

...Gandhi will not lead India to capable self-government. The British Raj must continue, firm and unshaken in its administration of justice to all men, to carry out the job it has taken in hand...

In his official response to the Hunter commission that inquired into the shooting, Dyer was unremorseful and stated: "I think it quite possible that I could have dispersed the crowd without firing but they would have come back again and laughed, and I would have made, what I consider, a fool of myself."

=== Hunter Commission ===
On 14 October 1919, after orders issued by the Secretary of State for India Edwin Montagu, the Government of India announced the formation of a committee of inquiry into the events in Punjab. Referred to as the Disorders Inquiry Committee, it was later more widely known as the Hunter Commission. It was named after the chairman, William, Lord Hunter, former Solicitor-General for Scotland and Senator of the College of Justice in Scotland. The stated purpose of the commission was to "investigate the recent disturbances in Bombay, Delhi and Punjab, about their causes, and the measures taken to cope with them". The members of the commission were:

- Lord Hunter, chairman of the commission
- Mr Justice George C. Rankin of Calcutta
- Sir Chimanlal Harilal Setalvad, vice-chancellor of Bombay University and advocate of the Bombay High Court
- W.F. Rice, member of the Home Department
- Major-General George Barrow, KCB, KCMG, GOC Peshawar Division
- Pandit Jagat Narayan, lawyer and member of the Legislative Council of the United Provinces
- Thomas Smith, member of the Legislative Council of the United Provinces
- Sardar Sahibzada Sultan Ahmad Khan, lawyer from Gwalior State
- H.C. Stokes, secretary of the commission and member of the Home Department

After meeting in New Delhi on 29 October, the commission took statements from witnesses over the following weeks. Witnesses were called in Delhi, Ahmedabad, Bombay, and Lahore. Although the commission as such was not a formally constituted court of law, meaning witnesses were not subject to questioning under oath, its members managed to elicit detailed accounts and statements from witnesses by rigorous cross-questioning. In general, it was felt the commission had been very thorough in its enquiries. After reaching Lahore in November, the commission wound up its initial inquiries by examining the principal witnesses to the events in Amritsar. The commission held its official sittings at the Lahore Town Hall near Anarkali Bazaar.

On 19 November, Dyer was ordered to appear before the commission. Although his military superiors had suggested he be represented by legal counsel at the inquiry, Dyer refused this suggestion and appeared alone. Initially questioned by Lord Hunter, Dyer stated he had come to know about the meeting at the Jallianwala Bagh at 12:40 hours that day but did not attempt to prevent it. He said that he had gone to the Bagh with the deliberate intention of opening fire if he found a crowd assembled there. Dyer told the commission, "I think it quite possible that I could have dispersed the crowd without firing, but they would have come back again and laughed, and I would have made, what I consider, a fool of myself." Dyer further reiterated his belief that the crowd in the Bagh was one of "rebels who were trying to isolate my forces and cut me off from other supplies. Therefore, I considered it my duty to fire on them and to fire well".

After Mr. Justice Rankin had questioned Dyer, Sir Chimanlal Setalvad enquired:

Sir Chimanlal: Supposing the passage was sufficient to allow the armoured cars to go in, would you have opened fire with the machine guns?

Dyer: I think probably, yes.

Sir Chimanlal: In that case, the casualties would have been much higher?

Dyer: Yes.

Dyer further stated that his intentions had been to strike terror throughout Punjab and in doing so, to reduce the moral stature of the "rebels". He said he did not stop the shooting when the crowd began to disperse because he thought it was his duty to keep shooting until the crowd was dispersed fully, and he believed that minimal shooting would not prove effective. In fact, he continued the shooting until the ammunition was almost exhausted. He stated that he did not make any effort to tend to the wounded after the shooting: "Certainly not. It was not my job. Hospitals were open and they could have gone there."

Exhausted from the rigorous cross-examination questioning and unwell, Dyer was then released. Over the next several months, while the commission wrote its final report, the British press, as well as many MPs, turned increasingly hostile towards Dyer as the full extent of the massacre and his statements at the inquiry became widely known. Lord Chelmsford refused to comment until the commission had been wound up. In the meanwhile, Dyer became seriously ill with jaundice and arteriosclerosis, and he was hospitalised.

Although the members of the commission were divided by racial tensions following Dyer's statement, and though the Indian members decided to write a separate minority report, the commission's final report, comprising six volumes of evidence and released on 8 March 1920, unanimously condemned Dyer's actions: In "continuing firing as long as he did, it appears to us that General Dyer committed a grave error." Dissenting members argued that the martial law regime's use of force was wholly unjustified. "General Dyer thought he had crushed the rebellion and Sir Michael O'Dwyer was of the same view", they wrote, "[but] there was no rebellion which required to be crushed."

The commission's report concluded that:

- Lack of notice to disperse from the Bagh, in the beginning, was an error.
- The length of firing showed a grave error.
- Dyer's motive of producing a sufficient moral effect was to be condemned.
- Dyer had overstepped the bounds of his authority.
- There had been no conspiracy to overthrow British rule in the Punjab.

The minority report of the Indian members further added that:

- Proclamations banning public meetings were insufficiently distributed.
- Innocent people were in the crowd, and there had been no violence in the Bagh beforehand.
- Dyer should have either ordered his troops to help the wounded or instructed the civil authorities to do so.
- Dyer's actions had been "inhuman and un-British" and had greatly injured the image of British rule in India.

The Hunter Commission did not impose any penal or disciplinary action because Dyer's actions were condoned by various superiors (later upheld by the Army Council). The Legal and Home Members on the Viceroy's Executive Council ultimately decided that, though Dyer had acted in a callous and brutal way, military or legal prosecution would not be possible due to political reasons. However, he was finally found guilty of a mistaken notion of duty and relieved of his command on 23 March. He had been recommended for a CBE as a result of his service in the Third Afghan War; this recommendation was cancelled on 29 March 1920.

Reginald Dyer was disciplined by removal from his appointment, was passed over for promotion and was prohibited from employment in India. He died in 1927.

=== Rioting in Gujranwala ===
Two days after the massacre, on 15 April 1919, riots occurred in Gujranwala protesting against the killings at Amritsar. Police and aircraft were used against the demonstrators, resulting in 12 deaths and 27 injuries. The officer commanding the Royal Air Force in India, Brigadier General N D K MacEwen, later stated that:

I think we can fairly claim to have been of great use in the late riots, particularly at Gujranwala, where the crowd when looking at its nastiest was absolutely dispersed by a machine using bombs and Lewis guns.

=== Compensation ===
British authorities awarded compensation to European subjects following the massacre. Starting in 1920, Indian subjects demanded the same compensation for Indians whose family members were killed or maimed as a result of brute imperial force. They also demanded a statement of regret from British authorities. British authorities initially resisted any form of payment but then agreed fearing political backlash from Indian subjects. British authorities raised the money to compensate Indian families through indemnities and taxes leveraged on Indian subjects. In 1922, the British government settled over 700 claims. The total amount in compensation allocated to Indian families was less than half of what was distributed among nearly a dozen European individuals.

=== Assassination of Michael O'Dwyer ===
Michael O'Dwyer c. 1912

On 13 March 1940, at Caxton Hall in London, Udham Singh, an Indian independence activist from Sunam who had witnessed the events in Amritsar and who had been wounded there, shot and killed Michael O'Dwyer, the lieutenant-governor of Punjab at the time of the massacre, who had approved Dyer's action and was believed to have been the main planner.

Some, such as the nationalist newspaper Amrita Bazar Patrika, made statements supporting the killing. The common people and revolutionaries glorified the action of Udham Singh. Much of the press worldwide recalled the story of Jallianwala Bagh and alleged that O'Dwyer was responsible for the massacre. Singh was termed a "fighter for freedom" and his action was referred to in The Times newspaper as "an expression of the pent-up fury of the down-trodden Indian People". Reporter and historian William L. Shirer wrote the next day, "Most of the ... Indians I know [other than Gandhi] will feel this is divine retribution. O'Dwyer bore a share of responsibility in the 1919 Amritsar massacre, in which Gen. Dyer shot 1,500 Indians in cold blood. When I was at Amritsar eleven years after [the massacre] in 1930, the bitterness still stuck in the people there."

In fascist countries, the incident was used for anti-British propaganda: Bergeret, published in large scale from Rome at that time, while commenting upon the Caxton Hall assassination, ascribed the greatest significance to the circumstance and praised the action of Sardar Udham Singh as courageous. The Berliner Börsen Zeitung termed the event "The torch of Indian freedom". German radio reportedly broadcast: "The cry of tormented people spoke with shots."

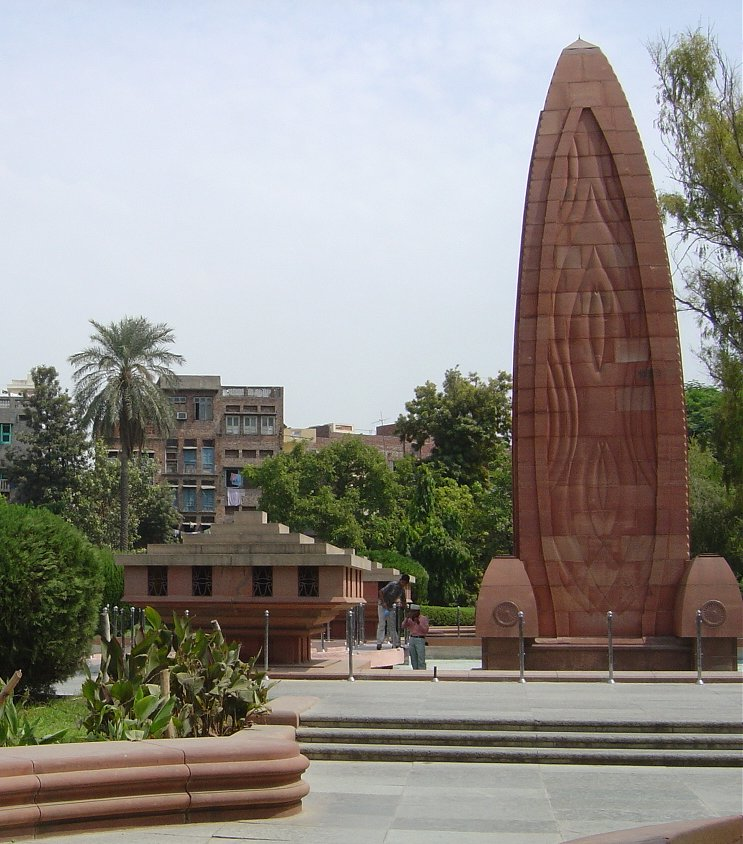
Wide view of Jallianwala Bagh memorial

At a public meeting in Cawnpore (now Kanpur), a spokesman stated that "at last an insult and humiliation of the nation had been avenged". Similar sentiments were expressed in numerous other places across the country. Fortnightly reports of the political situation in Bihar mentioned: "It is true that we had no love lost for Sir Michael. The indignities he heaped upon our countrymen in Punjab have not been forgotten." In its 18 March 1940 issue Amrita Bazar Patrika wrote: "O'Dwyer's name is connected with Punjab incidents which India will never forget." The New Statesman observed: "British conservatism has not discovered how to deal with Ireland after two centuries of rule. Similar comment may be made on British rule in India. Will the historians of the future have to record that it was not the Nazis but the British ruling class which destroyed the British Empire?"

Singh told the court at his trial:

I did it because I had a grudge against him. He deserved it. He was the real culprit. He wanted to crush the spirit of my people, so I have crushed him. For full 21 years, I have been trying to wreak vengeance. I am happy that I have done the job. I am not scared of death. I am dying for my country. I have seen my people starving in India under the British rule. I have protested against this, it was my duty. What greater honour could be bestowed on me than death for the sake of my motherland?

Singh was hanged for the murder on 31 July 1940. At that time, many, including Jawaharlal Nehru and Mahatma Gandhi, condemned the murder as senseless even if it was courageous. In 1952, Nehru (by then Prime Minister) honoured Udham Singh with the following statement, which appeared in the daily Partap:

I salute Shaheed-i-Azam Udham Singh with reverence who had kissed the noose so that we may be free.

Soon after this recognition by the Prime Minister, Udham Singh received the title of Shaheed, a name given to someone who has attained martyrdom or done something heroic on behalf of their country or religion.

== Monument and legacy ==
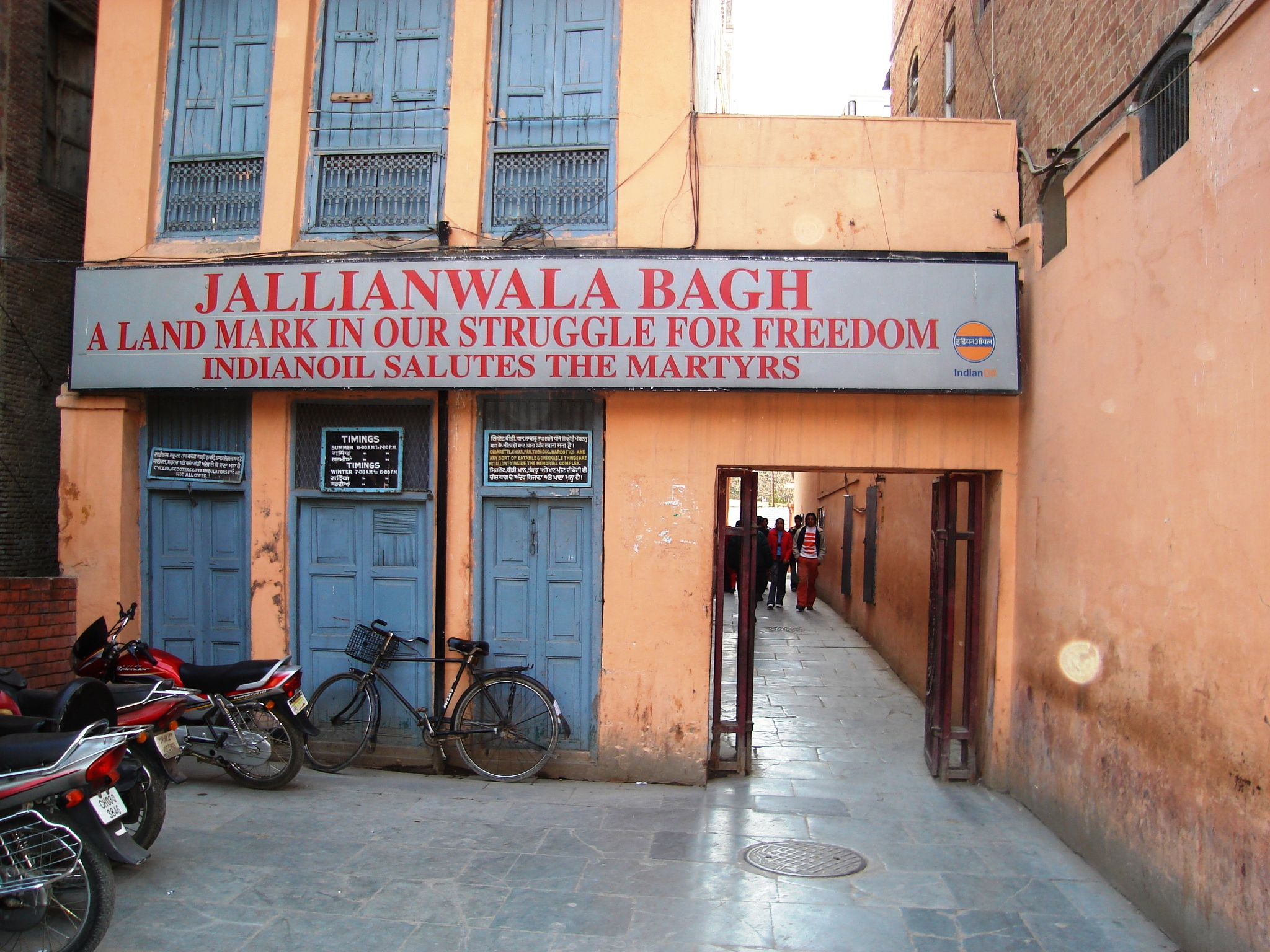
Entrance to the present-day Jallianwala Bagh

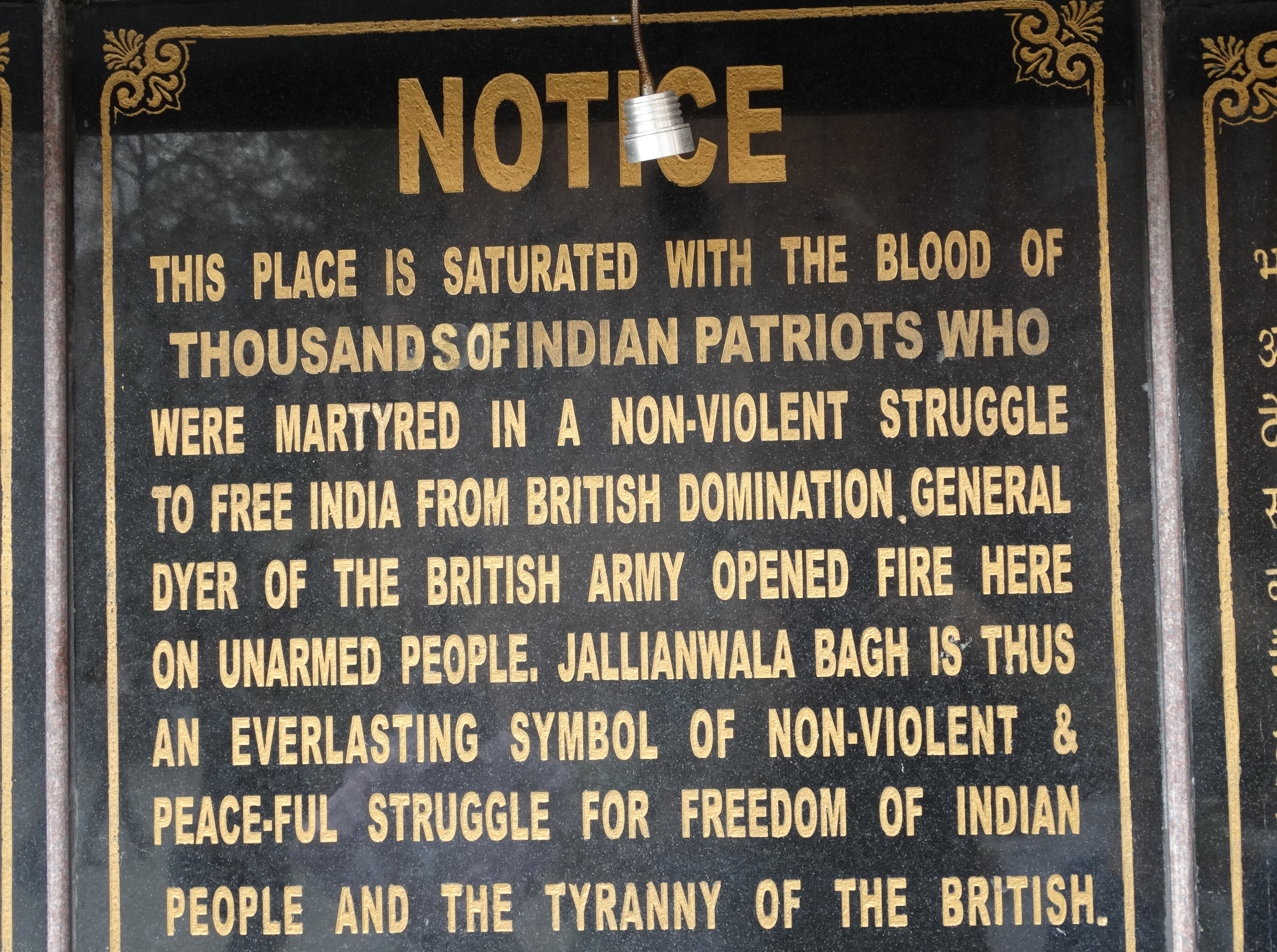
Memorial plaque at Jallianwala Bagh

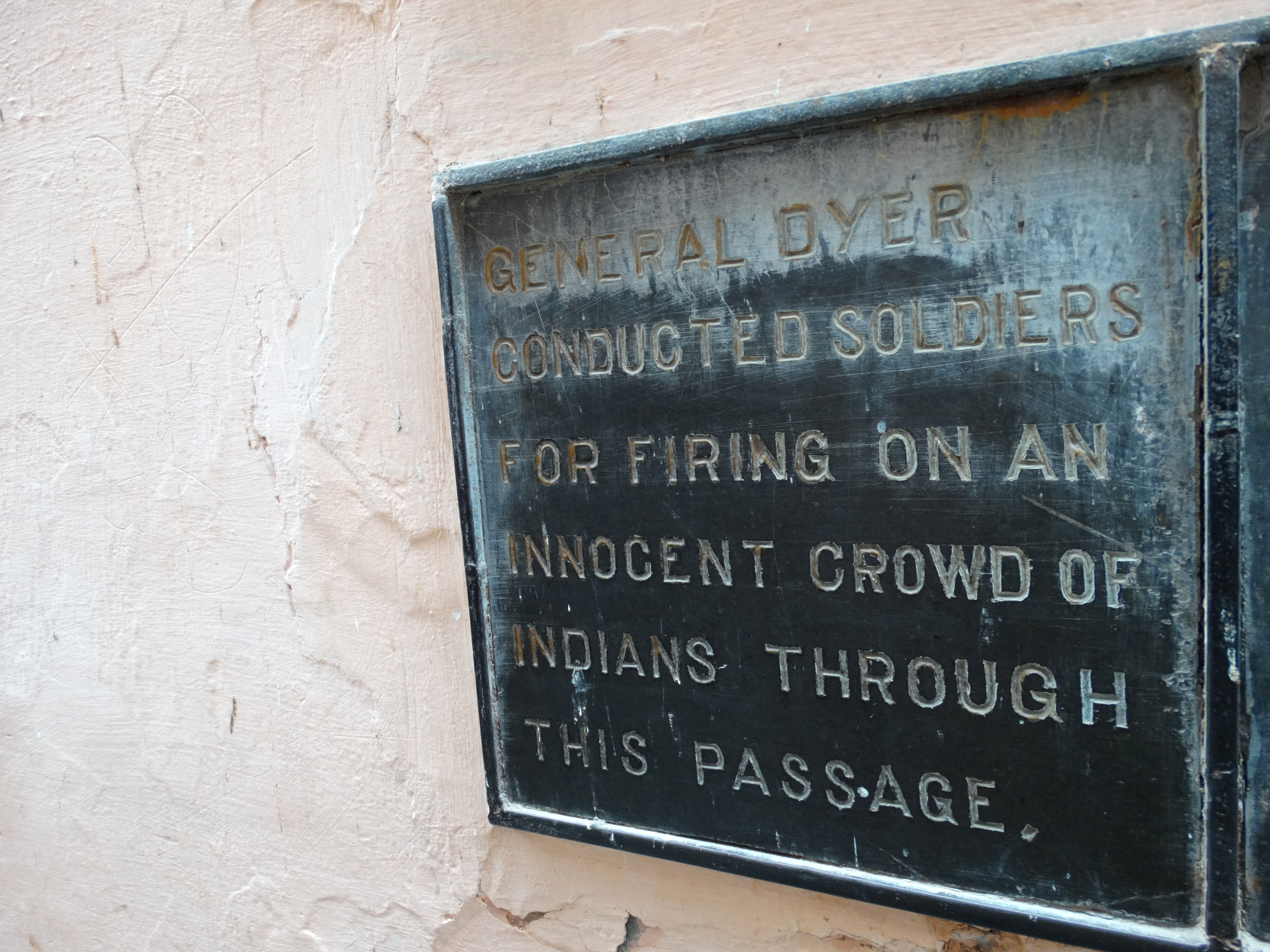
Memorial plaque in passageway of Jallianwala Bagh site

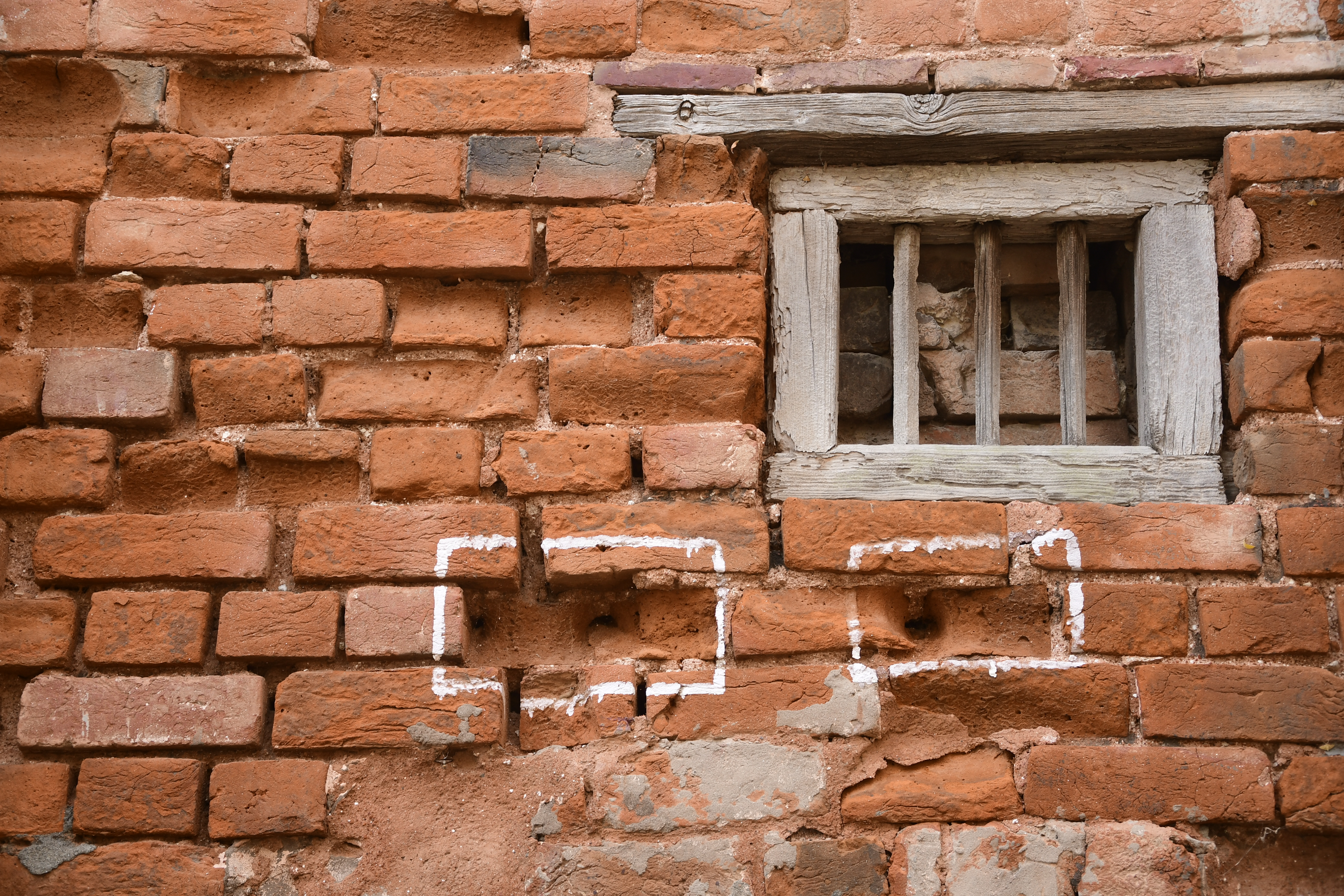
Bullet holes in wall at Jallianwala Bagh memorial

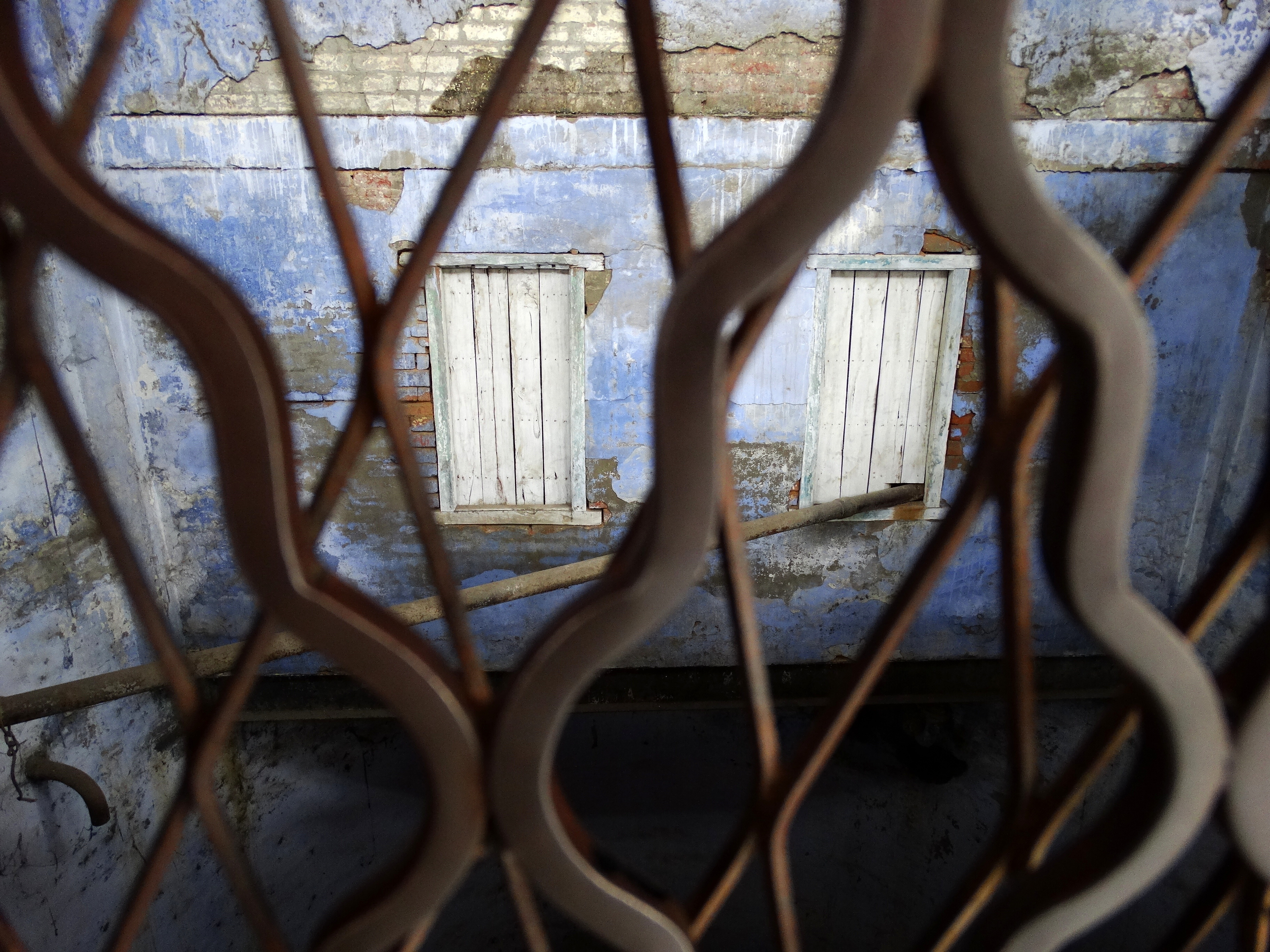
Martyrs Well at the Jallianwala Bagh memorial

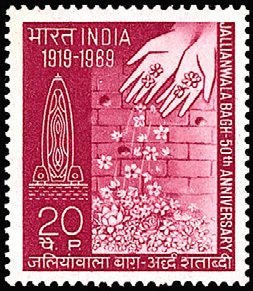
Postage Stamp of 50th Anniversary of Jallianwala Bagh Massacre

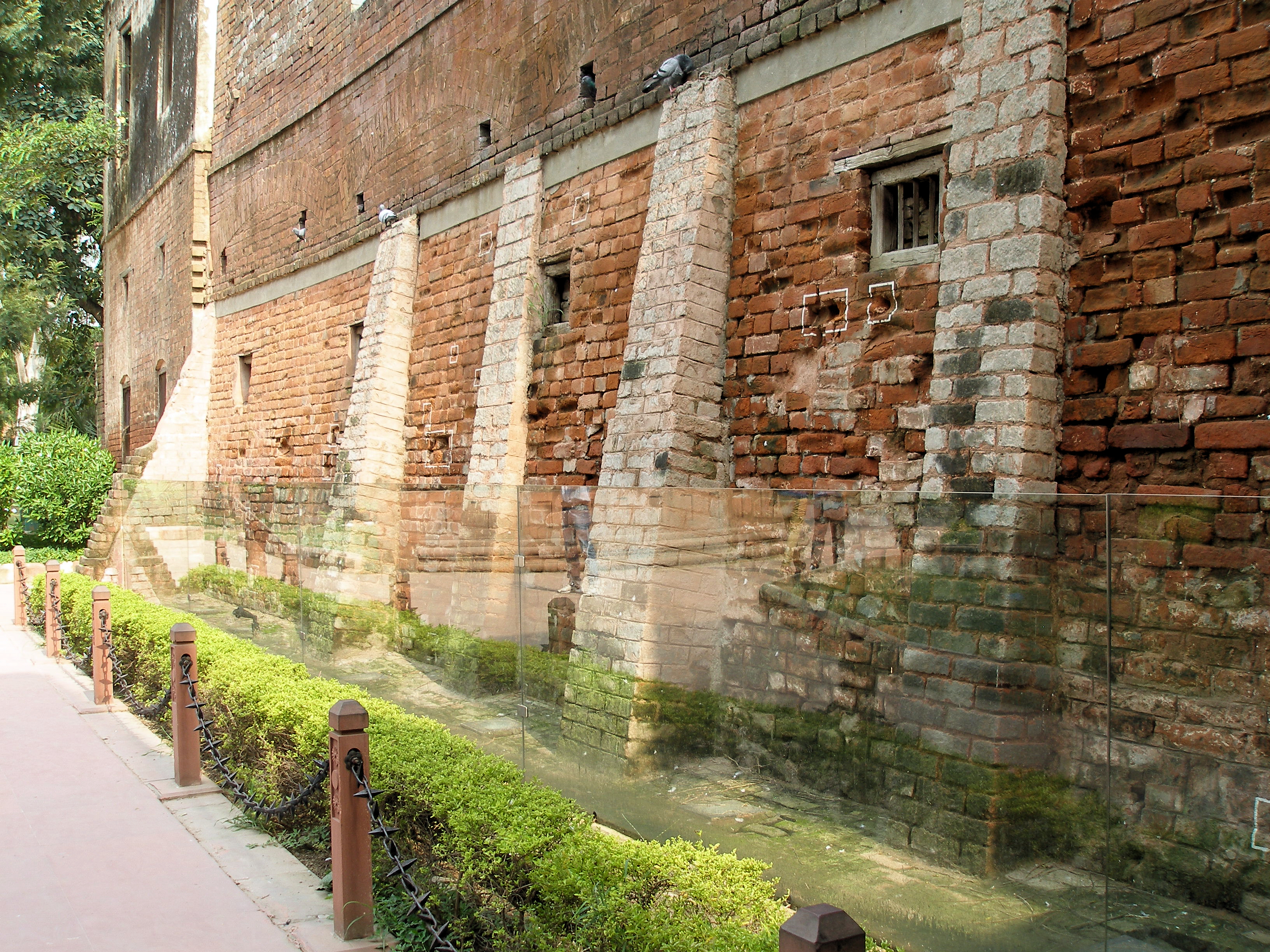
Bullet marks, visible on preserved walls, at present-day Jallianwala Bagh

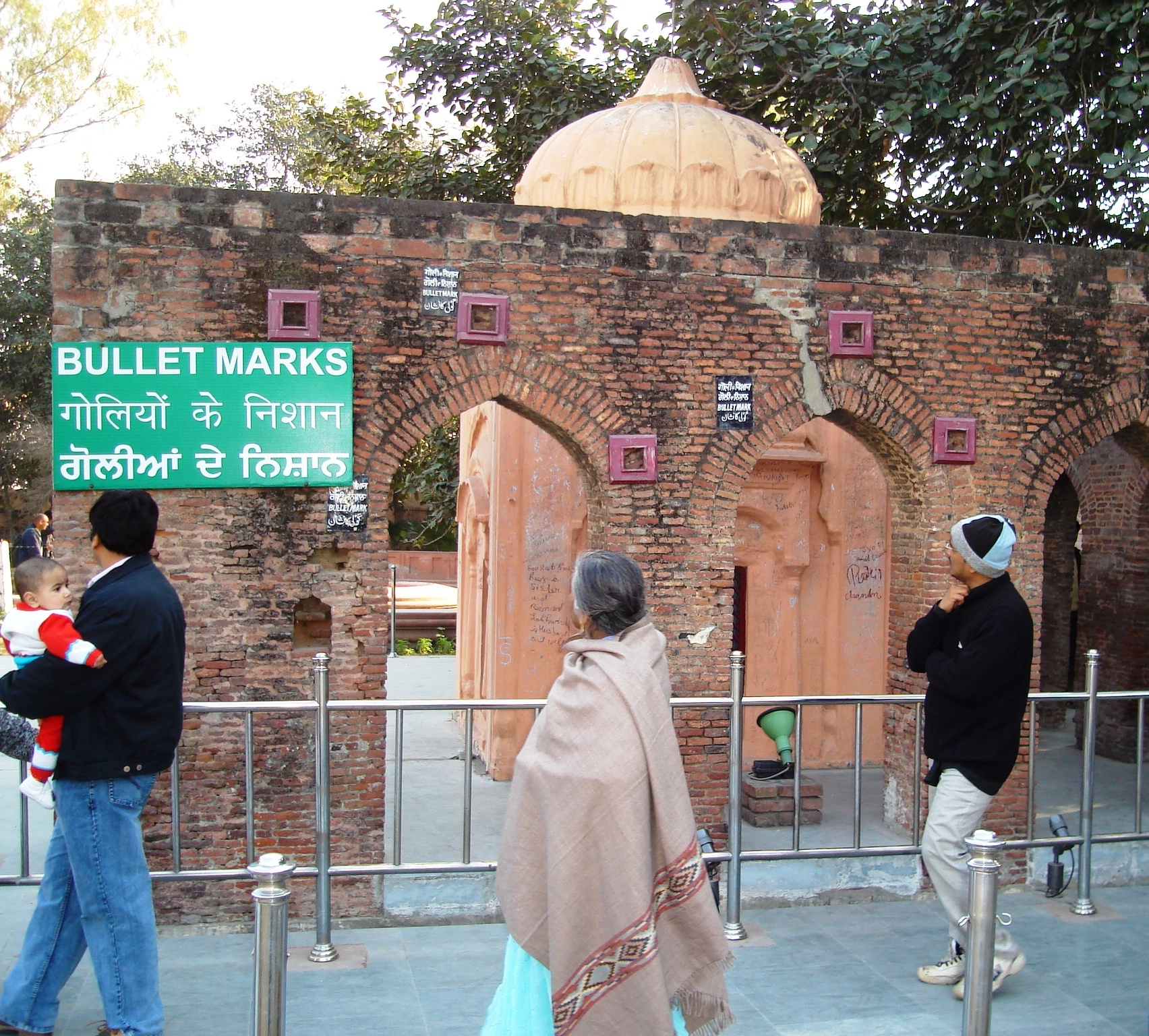

A trust was founded in 1920 to build a memorial at the site after a resolution was passed by the Indian National Congress. In 1923, the trust purchased land for the project. A memorial, designed by American architect Benjamin Polk, was built on the site and inaugurated by President of India Rajendra Prasad on 13 April 1961, in the presence of Jawaharlal Nehru and other leaders. A flame later was added to the site.

The bullet marks remain on the walls and adjoining buildings to this day. The well into which many people jumped and drowned attempting to save themselves from the bullets is also a protected monument inside the park.

=== Formation of the Shiromani Gurudwara Prabandhak Committee ===
Shortly after the massacre, the official Sikh clergy of the Harmandir Sahib (Golden Temple) in Amritsar conferred upon Dyer the Saropa (the mark of distinguished service to the Sikh faith or, in general, humanity), sending shock waves among the Sikh community. On 12 October 1920, students and faculty of the Amritsar Khalsa College called a meeting to strengthen the Nationalistic Movement. The students pushed for an anti-British movement and the result was the formation of the Shiromani Gurudwara Prabhandak Committee on 15 November 1920 to manage and to implement reforms in Sikh shrines.

=== Visit by Queen Elizabeth II ===
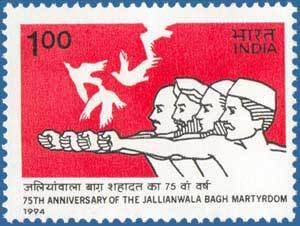
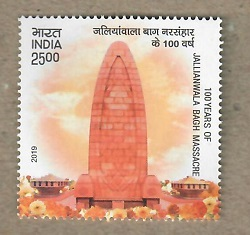
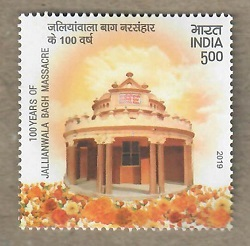
75 and 100 Years Of Jallianwala Bagh Massacre 1994 and 2019 stamp

Although Queen Elizabeth II had not made any comments on the incident during her state visits in 1961 and 1983, she spoke about the events at a state banquet in India on 13 October 1997:

It is no secret that there have been some difficult episodes in our past – Jallianwala Bagh, which I shall visit tomorrow, is a distressing example. But history cannot be rewritten, however much we might sometimes wish otherwise. It has its moments of sadness, as well as gladness. We must learn from the sadness and build on the gladness.

While some Indians welcomed the expression of regret and sadness in the Queen's statement, others criticised it for being less than an apology. Prime Minister of India Inder Kumar Gujral defended the Queen, saying that she had not even been born at the time of the events and should not be required to apologise.

On 14 October 1997, the Queen visited Jallianwala Bagh and paid her respects with a 30‑second moment of silence. During the visit, she wore a dress of a colour described as pink apricot or saffron, which is of religious significance to Hindus and Sikhs, as well as one of the colours on India's flag. She removed her shoes while visiting the monument and laid a wreath of marigolds in memorial.

During her visit to the monument, there were protests in the city of Amritsar, with people waving black flags and chanting "Queen, go back." Queen Elizabeth and Prince Philip merely signed the visitor's book; the fact that they did not leave any comment regretting the incident was criticised.

During the same visit, Philip and his guide Partha Sarathi Mukherjee came to a plaque stating that "about two thousand Hindus, Sikhs and Muslims ... were martyred in a non-violent struggle" at the site.

"That's a bit exaggerated," Philip asserted, "it must include the wounded." Mukherjee ... asked Philip how he had come to this conclusion. "I was told about the killings by General Dyer's son," Mukherjee recalls the Duke as saying, "I'd met him while I was in the Navy."

These statements by Philip drew widespread condemnation in India. Indian journalist Praveen Swami wrote in Frontline magazine:

That [this was] the solitary comment Prince Philip had to offer after his visit to Jallianwala Bagh[,] ... [and] the only aspect of the massacre that exercised his imagination, caused offence. It suggested that the death of 379 people was in some way inadequate to appall the royal conscience, in the way the death of 2,000 people would have. Perhaps more important of all, the staggering arrogance that Prince Philip displayed in citing his source of information on the tragedy made clear the lack of integrity in the wreath-laying.

=== Demands for an apology ===
There are long-standing demands in India that Britain should apologise for the massacre. Winston Churchill, on 8 July 1920, urged the House of Commons to punish Dyer. Churchill, who described the massacre as "monstrous", succeeded in persuading the House to forcibly retire Dyer but would have preferred to have seen him disciplined.

An apology of sorts was made at the time in a statement by Sir William Vincent, the home member of the Viceroy's Council, during a debate on the Punjab disturbances. This statement expressed the deep regret of the Government of India and made clear that the actions taken were wrong and repudiated by the government. Vincent said that "overdrastic and severe action, excessive use of force and acts ... reasonably interpreted as designed to humiliate Indian people ... cannot but be regarded as unpardonable (and) morally indefensible." In addition, the Indian Government reported in despatches to the UK government that Dyer's actions were far beyond what was necessary and violated the principle of using reasonable and minimum force. A manual was created after the massacre to instruct officers in their use of force, which was to be avoided unless absolutely necessary.

In February 2013, David Cameron became the first serving British prime minister to visit the site; he laid a wreath at the memorial and described the Amritsar massacre as "a deeply shameful event in British history, one that Winston Churchill rightly described at that time as monstrous. We must never forget what happened here and we must ensure that the UK stands up for the right of peaceful protests". Cameron did not deliver an official apology. This was criticised by some commentators. Writing in The Telegraph, Sankarshan Thakur stated: "Over nearly a century now British protagonists have approached the 1919 massacre ground of Jallianwala Bagh thumbing the thesaurus for an appropriate word to pick. 'Sorry' has not been among them."

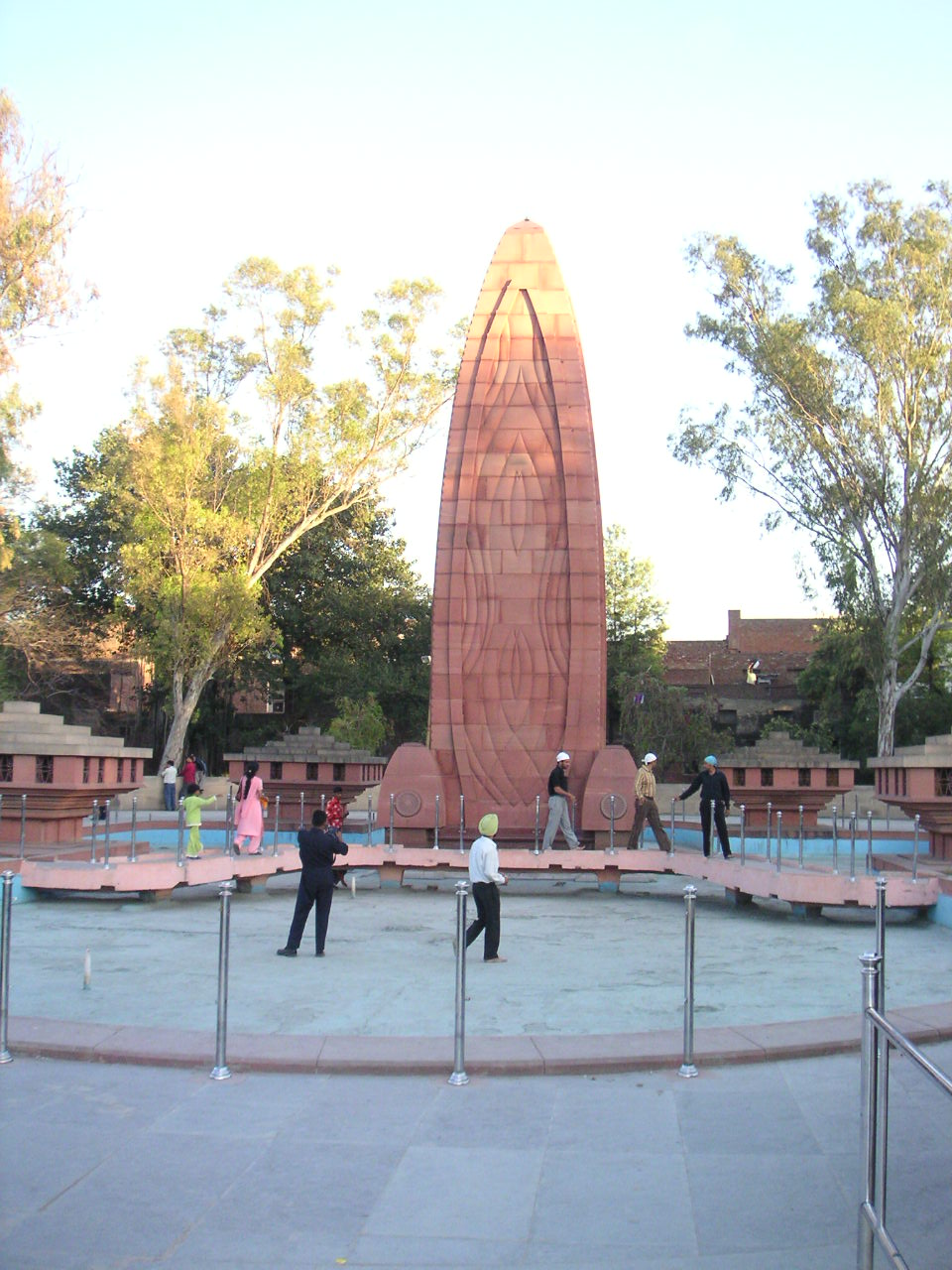
Jallianwala Bagh memorial

The issue of apology resurfaced during the 2016 India visit of Prince William, Duke of Cambridge, and the Duchess of Cambridge when both decided to skip the memorial site from their itinerary. In 2017, Indian author and politician Shashi Tharoor suggested that the Jalianwala Bagh centenary in 2019 could be a "good time" for the British to apologise to the Indians for wrongs committed during the colonial rule. Visiting the memorial on 6 December 2017, London's mayor Sadiq Khan called on the British government to apologise for the massacre.

In February 2019, the British House of Lords began discussing and debating the massacre.

On 12 April 2019, a ceremony was held in Amritsar just before the centenary anniversary of the massacre. Although she did not issue an apology, British Prime Minister Theresa May called the 1919 shooting of unarmed civilians a "shameful scar", echoing the 2013 statement made by David Cameron.

=== National memorial event in the UK ===
On 15 April 2019, a national memorial event titled "Jallianwala Bagh 100 Years On" was held in the British Parliament, hosted by Jasvir Singh and organised by City Sikhs and the Faiths Forum for London. Testimonies of survivors were read from the book Eyewitness at Amritsar. There were traditional musical performances, and a minute's silence was held to remember those who had been killed a century earlier.

=== The Asian Awards ===
In April 2019 The Asian Awards honoured the Martyrs of Jallianwala Bagh with the prestigious Founders Award. It was accepted by the nephew of Bhagat Singh, Jagmohan Singh.

=== 2021 assassination attempt on Queen Elizabeth II ===
On Christmas Day, 2021, Jaswant Singh Chail entered the grounds of Windsor Castle, where Queen Elizabeth II was living, intending to assassinate her with a crossbow. In a video he posted to Snapchat, he said "This is revenge for those who have died in the 1919 Jallianwala Bagh massacre. It is also revenge for those who have been killed, humiliated and discriminated on because of their race". He was arrested before entering the castle, and in February 2023, admitted three counts of treason, the first charge of treason in the UK since 1981.

In a televised hearing Mr Justice Hilliard sentenced Chail to nine years with a further five years on extended licence. Under the hybrid order, Chail will be transferred from Broadmoor psychiatric hospital to serve his sentence in prison when he is well enough.

== Arts and representations ==
The Jallianwala Bagh massacre is a common subject of literature and film.

=== Literature ===
- 1932: Noted Hindi poet Subhadra Kumari Chauhan wrote a poem, "Jallianwalla Bagh Mein Basant", (Spring in the Jallianwalla Bagh) in memory of the slain in her anthology Bikhre Moti (Scattered Pearls).
- 1981: Salman Rushdie's novel Midnight's Children portrays the massacre from the perspective of a doctor in the crowd, saved from the gunfire by a well-timed sneeze.
- 2009: Bali Rai's novel, City of Ghosts, is partly set around the massacre, blending fact with fiction and magical realism. Dyer, Udham Singh and other real historical figures feature in the story.

=== Films ===
- 1977: The massacre is portrayed in the Hindi movie Jallian Wala Bagh starring Vinod Khanna, Parikshat Sahni, Shabana Azmi, Sampooran Singh Gulzar, and Deepti Naval. The film was written, produced and directed by Balraj Tah with the screenplay by Gulzar. The film is a part-biopic of Udham Singh (played by Parikshit Sahni) who assassinated Michael O'Dwyer in 1940. Portions of the film were shot in the UK notably in Coventry and surrounding areas.
- 1982: The massacre is depicted in Richard Attenborough's film Gandhi with the role of General Dyer played by Edward Fox. The film depicts most of the details of the massacre as well as the subsequent inquiry by the Hunter commission.
- 2000: Shaheed Udham Singh, a Hindi language film is based on the JallianWala Bagh Massacre and the assassination of Michael O'Dwyer by Udham Singh.
- 2002: In the Hindi film The Legend of Bhagat Singh directed by Rajkumar Santoshi, the massacre is reconstructed with the child Bhagat Singh as a witness, eventually inspiring him to become a revolutionary in the Indian independence movement.
- 2006: Portions of the Hindi film Rang De Basanti nonlinearly depict the massacre and the influence it had on the freedom fighters.
- 2007: The Jallianwala Bagh Massacre is mentioned in the final debate scene on civil disobedience, portrayed in the film The Great Debaters.
- 2012: A few shots of the massacre are captured in the movie Midnight's Children, a Canadian-British film adaptation of Salman Rushdie's 1981 novel of the same name directed by Deepa Mehta.
- 2017: The Hindi language film Phillauri refers to the massacre as the reason the spirit of the primary character portrayed by Anushka Sharma cannot find peace as her lover lost his life in Amritsar and was unable to return to their village for their wedding. The movie depicts the massacre and the following stampede, with the climax shot on-location at the modern-day Jallianwallah Bagh memorial.
- 2021: Sardar Udham, a Hindi language film is based on the JallianWala Bagh Massacre and the assassination of Michael O'Dwyer by Udham Singh.
- 2025: Kesari Chapter 2, a Hindi-language historical courtroom drama film, based on the book The Case That Shook The Empire by Raghu Palat and Pushpa Palat, focusing on the Indian lawyer C. Sankaran Nair and the aftermath of the Jallianwala Bagh Massacre.

=== Television ===
- 1984: The massacre is recounted in the seventh episode of Granada TV's 1984 series The Jewel in the Crown, told by the fictional widow of a British officer who is haunted by the inhumanity of it and who tells how she came to be reviled because she ignored the honours to Dyer and instead donated money to the Indian victims.
- 2014: The British period drama Downton Abbey makes a reference to the massacre in the eighth episode of season 5 as "that terrible Amritsar business". The characters of Lord Grantham, Isobel Crawley and Shrimpy express their disapproval of the massacre when Lord Sinderby supports it.
- 2019: The UK's BBC broadcast historian Zareer Masani's Amritsar 1919: Remembering a British Massacre was broadcast.
- 2019: the UK's Channel 4 broadcast "The Massacre That Shook the Empire" on Saturday 13 April at 9 p.m. in which writer Sathnam Sanghera examined the 1919 massacre and its legacy.
- 2019: The UK's BBC broadcast a special "Thought for the Day" on Friday 12 April presented by Jasvir Singh to mark the anniversary.

== See also ==
- Vidurashwatha massacre – Jallianwala of southern India
- Babrra massacre
- Charan Paduka massacre on the Makar Sankranti festival (14 January 1930) in Chhatarpur, called the "Jallianwala Bagh of Madhya Pradesh": General Fischer ordered the firing on non-violent Indian freedom fighters resulting in 21 deaths and many injured.
- Patharighat massacre – Jallianwala of Assam
- Rawalpindi Massacres
- List of massacres in India
- Massacre of Chumik Shenko
- Bloody Sunday, a day of IRA assassinations in Ireland and revenge attacks by the Royal Irish Constabulary on a crowd at Croke Park and on prisoners at Dublin Castle in 1920
- Sétif and Guelma massacre
- Timeline of the Jallianwala Bagh massacre
