= Ayya =

Ayya may refer to:

- Vishnu, Ayya in Tamil and Malayalam, the Hindu deity
- Ayya Vaikundar (1809–1851), Indian Hindu saint, founder of Ayyavazhi
  - Ayyavazhi, an Indian religion
  - Ayya Vaikunda Avataram, the birth anniversary of the saint, celebrated by followers of Ayyavazhi
  - Historical Vaikundar, historicity of the saint's life beyond Ayyavazhi scriptures
- Ayyappan, a Hindu deity, the son of Vishnu ("Ayya") in his Mohini avatar and Shiva ("Appa")
- Muneeswarar or Muni Ayya, a Hindu deity, form of Shiva
- Ayya (Pali word), Ayya, the Pali term, translated as "honourable" or "worthy," commonly used in reference to ordained female Buddhist monks
- Ayya (2005 Tamil film), a 2005 Indian Tamil-language film directed by Hari
- Ayya (2005 Kannada film), a 2005 Indian Kannada-language film starring Darshan and Rakshitha
- Ayya, Kapurthala, India
- Ayya (river), a river in Perm Krai, Russia
- Ayya (smartphone), a Russian smartphone

== See also ==
- Swami Ayyappan (disambiguation)
