= Swami Ayyappan =

Swami Ayyappan may refer to:

- Ayyappan, a Hindu deity
- Swami Ayyappan (1975 film), an Indian film about the deity
- Swami Ayyappan (2012 film), an Indian animated film about the deity
- Swami Ayyappan (TV series), an Indian mythological TV series about the deity

== See also ==
- Ayyappa (disambiguation)
- Swami (disambiguation)
- Ayya (disambiguation)
- Appan (disambiguation)
- Appa (disambiguation)
- Sree Ayyappa College, Eramallikkara, Kerala, India
- Sree Ayyappanum Vavarum, a 1982 Indian film about the deity
