= Jallian Wala Bagh =

- Directed by: Balraj Tah
- Screenplay by: Gulzar
- Produced by: Balraj Tah
- Starring: Vinod Khanna; Parikshat Sahni; Shabana Azmi; Deepti Naval; Om Shivpuri
- Cinematography: Jaywant Pathare
- Edited by: Lachhman Dass
- Music by: R. D. Burman
- Release date: 1977
- Country: India
- Language: Hindi

Jallian Wala Bagh is a 1977 Indian Hindi-language film written, produced and directed by Balraj Tah, with a screenplay by Gulzar. It is based on the Jallianwala Bagh massacre, also known as the Amritsar massacre, where in 1919 Colonel Reginald Dyer ordered his Nepalese (Gurkha) and Indian (sepoy) troops under his command to fire into a crowd of unarmed Indian civilians, killing at least 379.

It stars Vinod Khanna, Parikshat Sahni, Shabana Azmi, Sampooran Singh Gulzar, and Deepti Naval.

The film is also a part-biopic of Udham Singh (played by Parikshit Sahni) who assassinated Michael O'Dwyer, the governor of Punjab at the time of the massacre, in 1940.

== Cast ==
- Vinod Khanna
- Parikshat Sahni as Udham Singh
- Shabana Azmi
- Sampooran Singh Gulzar as Suneel
- Om Shivpuri
- Ram Mohan
- Deepti Naval
- Sudhir Thakkar
- Mark Freeman

== Music ==
1. "Ditti Heer Likha Ke Ae He Chitthi" – Bhupinder Singh
2. "Suliyon Pe Chadke Choome (Part 1)" – Bhupinder Singh
3. "Suliyon Pe Chadke Chume (Part- 2)" – Bhupinder Singh
