= Sankarshan Thakur =

Indian print journalist (1962–2025)

Sankarshan Thakur (1962 – 8 September 2025) was an Indian print journalist. Thakur served as the Editor of The Telegraph.

== Background ==
Thakur was born in Singhwara, Darbhanga, Bihar in 1962. His work was deeply inspired by M.J. Akbar, under whom Thakur apprenticed as a journalist for many years. Thakur was the Executive Editor of Tehelka weekly, which he helped launch in early 2004. He returned to The Telegraph, where he started his journalistic career in 1985, as the newspaper's Roving Editor. He was earlier Associate Editor of The Indian Express. Thakur covered Bihar and Kashmir extensively. Some of his most memorable stories came off the Kargil warfront in the summer of 1999. He won the Prem Bhatia award for excellence in political journalism in 2001. In 2003, he won the Appan Menon Fellowship to work on a book on Kashmir which is in the making. He died on 8 September 2025, at the age of 63.

== Publications ==
- Thakur authored a book based on life of Lalu Prasad Yadav titled as The Making of Laloo Yadav, The Unmaking of Bihar (ISBN 978-8172234003); the book was recently updated and reprinted by Picador India under the title "Subaltern Sahib: Bihar and the Making of Laloo Yadav".
- Thakur also authored a biography of Nitish Kumar titled Single Man: The Life And Times of Nitish Kumar of Bihar.
- In November 2015, Thakur's book The Brothers Bihari featuring a dual biography of Laloo Yadav and Nitish Kumar was released.
