= Swami (disambiguation) =

Swami is a Hindu honorific title, which also has other meanings such as the husband, possessor, or owner.

Swami or Swamy may also refer to:

== Literature and fictional characters ==
- "The Swami", an alter ego of Chris Berman
- Swami, the central character of books like Swami and Friends (1935) and Malgudi Days (1943) by R. K. Narayan
- Swami (novel), a 1962 novel by Ranjit Desai

== Films ==
- Swami (1977 film), a Hindi film directed by Basu Chatterjee
- Swamy (2004 film), a Telugu film directed by V. R. Pratap
- Swamy (2005 film), a Kannada film directed by M. S. Ramesh
- Swami (2007 film), a Hindi film

== People ==
- Swamy (surname)

== Other ==
- Swami belt, a kind of climbing harness
- Swami Records, a record label
- Swami (band), a United Kingdom band
- Swami, a software used for editing SoundFont files
- Swami's (surfing), an Encinitas, California, surfing spot

== See also ==
- Swamiji (disambiguation)
- Swami Ayyappan (disambiguation)
- Suomi (disambiguation) (pronounced as swami in Finnish)
