= Appa =

Appa or APPA may refer to:

== Organizations ==
- American Psychopathological Association, a scientific professional organization
- American Philosophical Practitioners Association, a non-profit educational organization
- American Public Power Association, an energy trade organization

== Entertainment ==
- Appa (band), a Japanese rock band formed in 2004
- Appa (Avatar: The Last Airbender), a creature from the television program Avatar: The Last Airbender
- Appa, a character played by Shivkumar Subramaniam in the 2016 Indian film Tu Hai Mera Sunday
- Appa Joshi, a horror character created by Indian writer Narayan Dharap
- Appa (judge royal), Hungarian noble from the 12th century
- Appa (rapper) (born 1983), Moroccan-Dutch rapper
- Appa (2016 film), a 2016 Indian Tamil language film
  - Appa 2, its upcoming sequel
- Appa (2019 film), a 2019 Nepali language film

== Other uses ==
- Appa, name of two trading posts of the Dutch West India Company in Benin, see Dutch Slave Coast
- Appa (title), Indian honorific title

== See also ==
- Appam, a type of pancake
- Appan (disambiguation)
- Swami Ayyappan (disambiguation)
