= Appan =

Appan may refer to:

== People ==
- Appan Menon (1947 – 1996), Indian journalist
- Appan Thacheth (1937 – 2011), Indian poet
- K. P. Appan (1936 – 2008), Indian literary critic
- M. P. Appan (1913 – 2003), Indian poet
- Shash Appan (b. 1996), Welsh activist

== Film ==
- Appan (film), a 2022 Indian film

== See also ==
- Appa (disambiguation)
