= Crawling Order =

1919 punitive order in Amritsar, British India

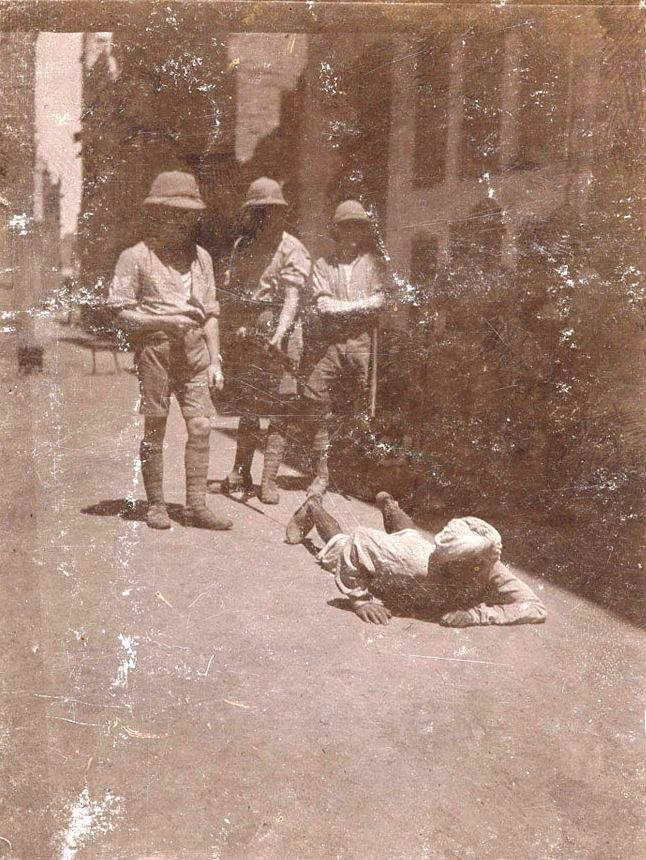
An Indian crawling up street where Sherwood was assaulted, 1919. Taken by Reginald Mortimer Howgego.

The Crawling Order was a punitive directive issued by British military officer Reginald Dyer, on 19 April 1919, during the period of martial law in Amritsar, British India, following the Jallianwala Bagh massacre. The order required all Indians using Kucha Kaurhianwala, the narrow street where British missionary Marcella Sherwood had been assaulted on 10 April 1919, to crawl on their hands and knees between the hours of 6am and 8pm.

== Background ==
Martial law was introduced in Punjab at midnight between 15 and 16 April 1919 and backdated to 30 March on 21 April by the Viceroy, at the request of Michael O'Dwyer.

== Instruction ==
The order to crawl was a punishment issued by Reginald Dyer, on 19 April 1919, during the period of martial law in Amritsar, British India, following the Jallianwala Bagh massacre that occurred on 13 April of that year.

The order required all Indians using Kucha Kaurhianwala, the narrow street where British missionary Marcella Sherwood had been assaulted on 10 April 1919, to crawl on their hands and knees. In practice the expectation was to slither like a reptile on one's abdomen.

The instruction was enforced for several days, and those who disobeyed were beaten by soldiers. The order was enforced between 6am and 8pm, and about 50 people were forced to crawl.

Upon hearing of the order, Edwin Montagu messaged Lord Chelmsford and called for Dyer to be relieved from his post. The order was lifted on 26 April 1919.

== Hunter Commission ==
The Hunter Commission of Inquiry later condemned the order, calling it "indefensible".

Dyer defended the order as a necessary measure to punish "wicked" behaviour and deter further attacks on Europeans. Critics denounced it as an act of deliberate humiliation and cruelty.

== Later responses ==
Mahatma Gandhi responded by saying that "the shooting was ‘frightful’, the loss of innocent life deplorable. But the slow torture, degradation and emasculation that followed was much worse, more calculated, malicious and soul-killing, and the actors who performed the deeds deserve greater condemnation than General Dyer for the Jallianwala Bagh massacre. The latter merely destroyed a few bodies but the others tried to kill the soul of a nation".

The episode became an example of the repressive measures imposed under martial law in Punjab after the disturbances of April 1919. It was widely cited in parliamentary debates and contributed to public condemnation in Britain and India against Dyer's actions.
