= Water Literacy Foundation =

Indian non-governmental organisation

- Founded: 2005; Bangalore, Karnataka, India
- Founder: Ayyappa Masagi
- Type: Non-governmental organization
- Purpose: Water conservation, Rainwater harvesting
- Region served: India
- Website: www.waterliteracyfoundation.com

Water Literacy Foundation is a non-governmental environmental organisation based in Bangalore, Karnataka, whose high goal is to make India a "water-efficient nation" by raising awareness about water scarcity and establishing rainwater harvesting in all areas of India.

== History ==
Ayyappa Masagi, who had been working as a mechanical engineer at Larsen & Toubro for 23 years, started to experiment with rainwater harvesting and non-irrigational agricultural methods in 1994. After a few years of successful results in his native region, Gadag, Karnataka, India, he quit his job to focus on working in the field of rainwater harvesting.

It was in 2004 when he earned the Ashoka fellowship for his work on water conservation. One year later, with the support of Ashoka: Innovators for the Public, he started Water Literacy Foundation, located in Bangalore, India. To obtain a change in India by 2020, the NGO is working to support farmers by giving them knowledge about non-irrigational agriculture and rainwater harvesting and realising projects that fight water scarcity. The activities of the foundation expand to individual houses and industries, trying to create solutions to the shortage of water linked to the fast-growing population of Bangalore.

In 2008, the foundation became associated with a new project: Rain Water Concepts Pvt Ltd (I) in a cross-subsidisation model. The social business implements rainwater harvesting systems for industries. Besides, it is funding the campaigns of the foundation among farmers and schools. Ayyappa Masagi was awarded the Jamnalal Bajaj Award in 2009.

Only four years later, the associated organisation entered the Limca Book of Records for constructing 500 lakes—the highest number of artificial lakes created by one company. Furthermore, the NGO claim to have indirectly recharged more than 70,000 borewells and reached around 1.5 million people in 36,000 locations.

== Activities ==
The goal of the foundation is to raise awareness about water shortages and implement rainwater harvesting systems in farms, houses, and industries. It offers several systems:

- Rooftop rainwater harvesting
- Lake type borewell recharging
- Infiltration wells
- Stream water harvesting
- Seepage recharging
- Sump type borewell recharging
- Non-irrigational agricultural practices
- Tree-based agriculture

To raise awareness, the foundation attends rallies, sponsors lectures, and gives talks at conferences such as TEDx conference, school education programs, or world water day events.

The foundation publishes books that instruct farmers to implement rainwater harvesting systems by themselves. The foundation is helped by international volunteers mainly hosted through a program of FSL India.

== See also ==
- Rainwater harvesting
- Water conservation
