= Swamiji =

Swamiji, swami-ji, or swami ji is a variant of swami that is used as a direct form of address toward, or as a stand-in for the name of, a Hindu religious leader (and usually capitalized in such usage).

It may more specifically refer to:

- Swamijis of the Ashta Mathas of Udupi, a group of eight Hindu monasteries
- Swamiji Ram Charan (1720–1799), founder of the Ramsnehi Sampradaya (Ramdwara) religious tradition, an offshoot of Hinduism
- Swamiji Vivekananda (1863–1902), chief disciple of Ramakrishna, one of the makers of modern India
- Swami Yogananda (1861-1899), Indian mystic
- Paramahansa Yogananda (1893-1952), Indian and American yogi and monk
- Swamiji Ram Kishor (1918–1994), 13th head of the Ramsnehi Sampradaya
- Pramukh Swami Maharaj (1921-2016), 5th Spiritual successor of Bhagwan Swaminarayan
- Mahant Swami Maharaj (1933-Present), 6th Spiritual successor of Bhagwan Swaminarayan and present leader of the BAPS Swaminarayan Sanstha
- Sathya Sai Baba (1926-2011), Indian spiritual guru
- Swamiji (film), a 2012 English-language documentary film about Vivekananda, directed by Manick Sorcar.
- Swamiji, fictional character in the Indian Baahubali franchise

== See also ==
- Swami (disambiguation)
