= Ayyappa Nagar =

Area of Chennai, Tamil Nadu, India

Coordinates: 12.97603°N 80.18586°E

Ayyappa Nagar is a residential area within Madipakkam, a southern suburb of Chennai (formerly known as Madras), in Tamil Nadu, India.

It was named after the temple built there to Lord Ayyappa, notable, like Sabarimala, for having eighteen steps.

Ayyappa Nagar has eighteen streets and extends from Sabari Salai to Keelkattalai. It belongs to the panchayat of Madipakkam, although a growing population means that Madipakkam is in reality no longer a village.

The New Madipakkam Lake was desilted in 2002/03, which helped improve the water table of the area. The area is low lying in relation to the adjacent Moovarsampet area, and water flows into the lake from there during the rainy season.

Ayyappa Nagar has two hospitals: GM Hospital and Padhuvai. It has few shops except for a small number of potti kadais (petty shops).

POPULAR TOURIST LOCAL SPOT

lake view is a popular spot for hanging out since it has a lot of shops and a café recently. There is a welfare association which conducts elections every two years.

The Ayyappan Temple has a large hall as its annex. Every year on 1 January a distribution of free food (annadanam) is made at the temple. The festivals of Vishu (Malayali new year in April) and Jothi (coinciding with Pongal in January) also bring many people to the temple.

Ayyappa Nagar is also a residential area near Koyambedu, Chennai Tamil Nadu.
