= Ayyappa Masagi =

Indian activist

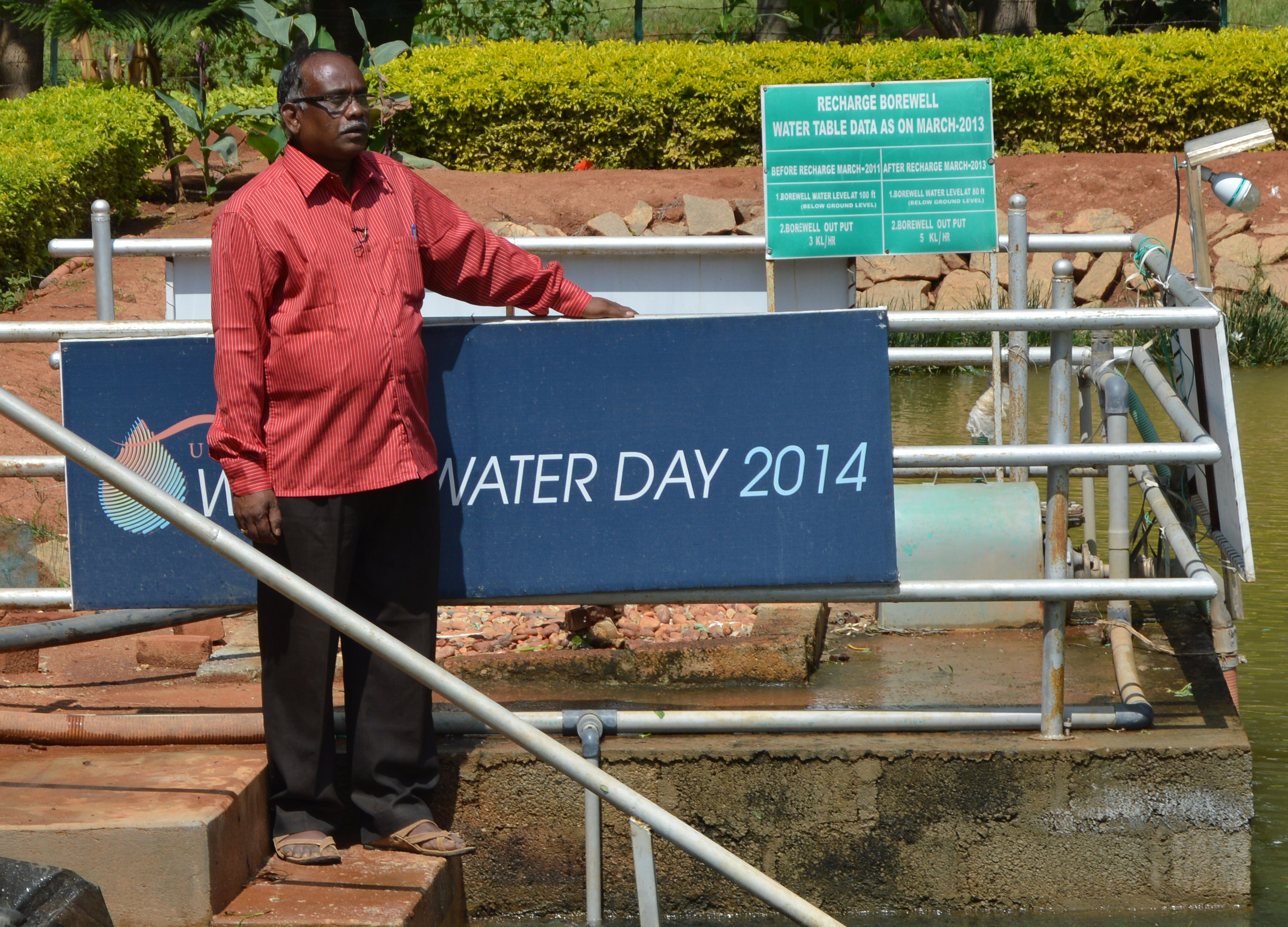
- Born: Gadag, Karnataka, India
- Occupation: Founder of Water Literacy Foundation

Ayyappa Masagi is an Indian engineer and founder of the Water Literacy Foundation. He is known as "Water Doctor" due to his non-profit work. The foundation focuses on water conservation projects across India, providing a wide range of solutions to India's water scarcity problem

== Personal life ==
Ayyappa Masagi was born in the small village of Gadag-Betageri, Karnataka. In his childhood, he faced acute water shortages, having to walk for hours with his mother to fetch water from the nearest stream bed. His passion for water conservation started because of this and grew as he gained relevant knowledge from his parents as well as research about water and agriculture. After graduating, he worked for Larsen & Toubro for 23 years as a mechanical engineer. Wanting to pursue his passion for helping India's growing water scarcity issue, he quit his job and founded the Water Literacy Foundation.

== Published work ==
Masagi authored Bhageeratha: War on Water Crisis, Converting Dry Land into Wet Land, where he discusses his own life experiences with water issues and project work with the Water Literacy Foundation. The book also explains different techniques to save and recharge our water.
