= Reginald Dyer =

British Indian Army officer (1864–1927)

Colonel Reginald Dyer CB
- Dyer c. 1919
- Born: 9 October 1864; Murree, Punjab, British India
- Died: 23 July 1927 (aged 62); Long Ashton, Somerset, England
- Spouse: Frances Anne Trevor Ommaney (m. 1888)
- Children: Gladys Mary b. 1889; Ivon Reginald, b. 1895; Geoffrey Edward MacLeod, b. 1896
- Military career
- Allegiance: British Empire: Presidency of Bengal; British India
- Branch: British Army; Bengal Army; British Indian Army
- Service years: 1885–1920
- Rank: Colonel; Brigadier-General (temporarily)
- Commands: Seistan Force; 25th Punjabis
- Conflicts: Third Anglo-Burmese War; Chitral Expedition; First World War; Third Anglo-Afghan War
- Awards: Companion of the Order of the Bath; Mentioned in Despatches (2)

Colonel Reginald Edward Harry Dyer, CB (9 October 1864 – 23 July 1927) was a British military officer in the Bengal Army and later the newly constituted British Indian Army. His military career began in the regular British Army, but he soon transferred to the presidency armies of India.

As a temporary brigadier-general, he was responsible for the Jallianwala Bagh massacre that took place on 13 April 1919 in Amritsar (in the province of Punjab). He has been called "the Butcher of Amritsar", because of his order to fire on a large gathering of people. The official report stated that this resulted in the killing of at least 379 people and the injuring of over a thousand more. Some submissions to the official inquiry suggested a higher number of deaths. After the massacre, he served in the Third Anglo-Afghan war, where he lifted the siege at Thal and inflicted heavy casualties on Afghans.

Dyer later resigned. He was widely condemned for spearheading the Jallianwala Bagh massacre, both in Britain and India, but he became a celebrated hero among some with connections to the British Raj.

== Life and career ==
Major Reginald Dyer at the Delhi Durbar of 1903

Dyer was born on 9 October 1864 in Murree, in the Punjab province of British India, which is now in Pakistan. He was the son of Edward Dyer, a brewer who managed the Murree Brewery, and Mary Passmore. He spent his childhood in Murree and Shimla and received his early education at the Lawrence College Ghora Gali, Murree and Bishop Cotton School in Shimla. From eleven he attended Midleton College in County Cork, Ireland, before briefly studying medicine, at the Royal College of Surgeons in Ireland. Dyer then decided to pursue a military career, and enrolled at the Royal Military College of Sandhurst, from where he graduated in August 1885. He was also fluent in a number of Indian languages as well as Persian.

Following his graduation, Dyer was commissioned into the Queen's Royal Regiment (West Surrey) as a lieutenant, and performed riot control duties in Belfast (1886) and served in the Third Burmese War (1886–87). He transferred to the Bengal Army, initially joining the Bengal Staff Corps as a lieutenant in 1887. He was attached to the 39th Bengal Infantry, later transferring to the 29th Punjabis. Dyer served in the latter in the Black Mountain campaign (1888), the Chitral Relief (1895) (promoted to captain in November 1896) and, after attending the Staff College, Camberley from 1896 to 1897, the Mahsud blockade (1901–02).

In 1901 he was appointed a deputy assistant adjutant general. In August 1903, Dyer was promoted to major, and served with the Landi Kotal Expedition (1908). He commanded the 25th Punjabis in India and Hong Kong and was promoted to lieutenant colonel in May 1910.

During the First World War (1914–18), he commanded the Seistan Force, for which he was mentioned in dispatches and made a Companion of the Order of the Bath (CB). He was promoted to colonel in March 1915, and was promoted to temporary brigadier-general in February 1916, when he took command of a brigade, and again in March 1918. In 1919, about a month after the Jallianwala Bagh killing, Dyer served in the Third Anglo-Afghan War. His brigade relieved the garrison of Thal, and inflicted heavy casualties on Afghans, for which he was again mentioned in dispatches. For a few months in 1919 he was posted to the 5th Brigade at Jamrud. He retired on 17 July 1920, retaining the rank of colonel.

In 1888 Dyer married Frances Anne Trevor Ommaney, the daughter of Edmund Piper Ommaney, on 4 April 1888, in St Martin's Church, Jhansi, India. The first of their three children, Gladys, was born in Shimla, India, in 1889. They also had two sons, Ivon Reginald, born 1895 and Geoffrey Edward MacLeod, born 1896.

== Amritsar massacre ==
=== Background ===
In 1919, the European population in Punjab feared the locals would overthrow British rule. A nationwide hartal (strike action), which was called on 30 March (later changed to 6 April) by Mahatma Gandhi, had turned violent in some areas. Authorities were also becoming concerned by displays of Hindu-Muslim unity. Michael O'Dwyer, the Lieutenant-Governor of Punjab, decided to deport major agitators from the province. One of those targeted was Dr. Satyapal, a Hindu who had served with the Royal Army Medical Corps during the First World War. He advocated non-violent civil disobedience and was forbidden by the authorities to speak publicly. Another agitator was Dr. Saifuddin Kitchlew, a Muslim barrister who wanted political change and also preached non-violence. The district magistrate, acting on orders from the Punjab government, had the two leaders arrested.

In protest at this action, demonstrators headed for the residence of Miles Irving, the Deputy Commissioner of Amritsar. The deputy commissioner had given orders that protestors were not to be allowed to pass into the civil lines (the civilian administrative area, effectively the "British area" of town). Army pickets fired on the crowd, killing at least eight protesters and wounding others. As a result, angry mobs formed, returning to Amritsar's city centre, setting fire to government buildings and attacking Europeans in the city. Three British bank employees were beaten to death, and Marcella Sherwood, who supervised the Mission Day School for Girls, was cycling around the city to close her schools when she was assaulted by a mob in a narrow street called the Kucha Kurrichhan. Sherwood was rescued from the mob by (Indian) locals. They hid the teacher, who was injured in the beating, before moving her to the fort. Dyer, who was the commandant of the infantry brigade in Jalandhar, was incensed that a European woman had been attacked and decided to take action. He arrived on 11 April to assume command.

=== Jallianwala Bagh Massacre ===
The event known historically as the Amritsar massacre occurred on 13 April 1919 in Amritsar. The date coincided with that of the annual Baisakhi celebrations which are both a religious and a cultural festival of the Punjabis, and would have attracted visitors from outside the city. On the morning of 13 April, Dyer issued a proclamation in English, Urdu and Punjabi at 19 locations around the city, and had handbills distributed, to the effect that a curfew was imposed, no processions were to take place, and that meetings of more than four individuals could be fired upon. By 12:30pm that day, Dyer was informed that, in defiance of his orders, a meeting was to be held in the Jallianwala Bagh.

Dyer was determined to suppress disobedience in Amritsar. The proposed meeting was to take place in the Jallianwala Bagh, in defiance of the proclamation; Dyer saw this as an opportunity to, in his view, suppress rebels, and, as he claimed, do so in isolation from the general populace. The meeting assembled at Jallianwala Bagh, a walled space of 6 to 7 acres (2 to 3 ha) with five entrances, four of which were narrow, admitting only a few people at a time. The fifth entrance was that used by Dyer and his troops. The organiser of the meeting was Dr Mohammed Bashir, who was later found guilty of inciting the attack on the National Bank. Seven people had addressed the meeting before Dyer arrived, including Brij Gopi Nath who read a poem inciting people to fight against the British crimes.

Dyer had at his command 50 troops, including 25 Gurkhas of 1/9 Gurkha Rifles (1st battalion, 9th Gurkha Rifles), 25 Pathans and Baluch from 59th Sindh Rifles, armed with .303 Lee–Enfield rifles, plus a further 40 Gurkhas armed only with kukris. He also had two armoured cars with machine guns, which were unable to pass through the entrance, and Dyer made no attempt to dismount their Vickers Machine Guns and deploy them in the Bagh. Upon entering the Bagh, the general ordered the troops to shoot directly into the gathering. The shooting continued unabated for about 10 minutes, and the soldiers fired a total of 1,650 rounds of ammunition, roughly a third of the rounds carried.

Dyer is reported to have, from time to time, "checked his fire and directed it upon places where the crowd was thickest", not because the crowd was slow to disperse, but because he "had made up his mind to punish them for having assembled there." Some of the soldiers initially shot into the air, at which Dyer shouted: "Fire low. What have you been brought here for?" Later, Dyer's own testimony revealed that the crowd was not given any warning to disperse and he was not remorseful for having ordered his troops to shoot.

The worst part of the whole thing was that the firing was directed towards the exit gates through which the people were running out. There were 3 or 4 small outlets in all and bullets were actually rained over the people at all these gates ... and many got trampled under the feet of the rushing crowds and thus lost their lives ... even those who lay flat on the ground were fired upon.

The Hunter Commission report on the incident, published the following year by the Government of India, criticised both Dyer, and the Government of the Punjab for failing to compile a casualty count, so quoted a figure offered by the Sewa Samati (A Social Services Society) of 379 identified dead, comprising 337 men, 41 boys and a six-week-old baby, with approximately 1,100 wounded, of which 192 were seriously injured. However other estimates, from government civil servants in the city (commissioned by the Punjab Sub-committee of Indian National Congress), as well as counts from the Home Political, cite numbers of well over a thousand dead. According to a Home Political Deposit report, the number was more than 1,000, with more than 1,200 wounded. Dr Smith, a British civil surgeon at Amritsar, estimated that there were over 1,800 casualties. The infliction of these casualties earned Dyer the epithet of the "Butcher of Amritsar".

=== Subsequent events ===
The day after the massacre Dyer continued along confrontational lines, even though the city was quiet. He met with a delegation of Amritsar citizens to whom he directed the following speech, without having received their petitions or heard from them. Made to the delegation in Urdu, the English translation of a segment of Dyer's statement is shown below, as given in Collett's The Butcher of Amritsar:

You people know well that I am a soldier and a military man. Do you want war or peace? If you wish for a war, the Government is prepared for it, and if you want peace, then obey my orders and open all your shops; else I will shoot. For me the battlefield of France or Amritsar is the same.

Dyer devised what even one of his generally supportive superiors, O'Dwyer, described as an "irregular and improper" retaliation for the attack on Marcella Sherwood, designed, it seemed, to fall indiscriminately and humiliatingly on the local population. On the street where the assault occurred, Kucha Kurrichhan, Dyer ordered daytime pickets placed at either end. Anyone wishing to proceed into the street between 6 am and 8 pm was made to crawl the 200 yards (180 m) on all fours, lying flat on their bellies. When questioned at the Hunter inquiry about this, Dyer explained his motivation:

Some Indians crawl face downwards in front of their gods. I wanted them to know that a British woman is as sacred as a Hindu god and therefore, they have to crawl in front of her too.

There was a curfew in effect from 8 pm, so the order effectively closed the street for the full 24 hours. The houses and shops had no back doors, so the inhabitants could not go out without climbing down from their roofs. No deliveries or services were available to those effectively locked in, so no food or other supplies could be replenished, any sick or injured had no medical attendance, and normal rubbish and latrine sanitary services were absent. The trapped inhabitants included some of the individuals responsible for rescuing and attending to Sherwood, the assault victim. This order was in effect from 19 April until 25, or possibly, 26 April 1919. In addition, Dyer had flogging triangles erected in the street; on these, youths arrested for the assault, some of whom were not subsequently convicted, were publicly flogged in view of the residents.

Days after ordering troops to fire on unarmed civilians at Jallianwala Bagh, Dyer was invited to the Golden Temple and honored with a robe-of-honour (sirpao or siropa) and a kirpan by the shrine's management. At this time, the temple management was controlled by hereditary priests and Colonial British Raj-backed managers.

=== Reaction in Britain and British India ===
A committee of inquiry, chaired by Lord Hunter, was established to investigate the massacre. The committee's report criticised Dyer, arguing that in "continuing firing as long as he did, it appears to us that Colonel Dyer committed a grave error." Dissenting members argued that the martial law regime's use of force was wholly unjustified. "Colonel Dyer thought he had crushed the rebellion and Michael O'Dwyer was of the same view," they wrote, "(but) there was no rebellion which required to be crushed." The Morning Post claimed Dyer was "the man who saved India" and started a benefit fund which raised over £26,000 sterling. Sources differ on how much, if anything Rudyard Kipling contributed to this fund and some sources claim that 'the man who saved India' line came from Kipling. Michael O'Dwyer, Lieutenant-Governor of Punjab from 1913 to 1919, endorsed Dyer and called the massacre a "correct" action. Some historians now believe he premeditated the massacre and set Dyer to work. Many Indians blamed O'Dwyer, and while Dyer was never assaulted, O'Dwyer was assassinated in London in 1940 by an Indian revolutionary, Sardar Udham Singh in retaliation for his role in the massacre.

Dyer was met by the Adjutant-General of India, Lieutenant-General Havelock Hudson, who told him that he was relieved of his command. He was told later by the Commander-in-Chief in India, General Charles Monro, to resign his post and that he would not be reemployed. He was heavily criticised both in Britain and India. Several senior and influential British government officials and Indians spoke against him, including:

- Pandit Motilal Nehru, father of Jawaharlal Nehru, the first Prime Minister of India, who called the massacre the "saddest and most revealing of all".
- Rabindranath Tagore, the first Asian Nobel Laureate and distinguished Indian educator, who renounced his knighthood in protest against the massacre and said, "a great crime has been done in the name of law in the Punjab".
- Shankaran Nair, who resigned his membership of the Viceroy's Executive Council in the Legislative Council of Punjab in protest of the massacre.
- Punjab Legislative Council members Nawab Din Murad and Kartar Singh, who described the massacre as "neither just nor humane."
- Charles Freer Andrews, an Anglican priest and friend of Gandhi, who termed the Jallianwala Bagh massacre as a "cold-blooded massacre and inhumane."
- Brigadier-General Herbert Conyers Surtees, who stated in the Dyer debate that "we hold India by force – undoubtedly by force".
- Edwin Samuel Montagu, the Secretary of State for India, who called it "a grave error in judgement". In a debate in the House of Commons, he asked, "Are you going to keep your hold on India by terrorism, racial humiliation, subordination and frightfulness, or are you going to rest it upon the goodwill and the growing goodwill of the people of your Indian Empire?"
- Winston Churchill, at the time Britain's Secretary of State for War, who called the massacre "an episode without precedent or parallel in the modern history of the British Empire ... an extraordinary event, a monstrous event, an event which stands in singular and sinister isolation ... the crowd was neither armed nor attacking" during a debate in the House of Commons. In a letter to the leader of the Liberals and former Secretary of State for India, the Marquess of Crewe, he wrote, "My own opinion is that the offence amounted to murder, or alternatively manslaughter."
- Leader of the Liberal Party and former Prime Minister H. H. Asquith, who observed: "There has never been such an incident in the whole annals of Anglo-Indian history, nor, I believe, in the history of our empire since its very inception down to present day. It is one of the worst outrages in the whole of our history."
- B. G. Horniman, who observed: "No event within living memory, probably, has made so deep and painful impression on the mind of the public in this country [Britain] as what came to be known as the Amritsar massacre."

Indian independence leader Mahatma Gandhi had condemned the massacre, and launched the non-cooperation movement. Gandhi later forgave Dyer for the massacre. In 1938, Gandhi wrote:

"General Dyer himself surely believed that English men and women were in danger of losing their lives if he did not take the measures he did. We, who know better, call it an act of cruelty and vengeance. But from General Dyer’s own standpoint, he is justified. Many Hindus sincerely believe that it is a proper thing to kill a man who wants to kill a cow and he will quote scripture for his defence and many other Hindus will be found to justify his action. But strangers who do not accept the sacredness of the cow will hold it to be preposterous to kill a human being for the sake of slaying an animal (sic)."

During the Dyer debates in the Parliament of the United Kingdom, there was both praise and condemnation of Dyer. In 1920, the British Labour Party Conference at Scarborough unanimously passed a resolution denouncing the Amritsar massacre as a "cruel and barbarous action" of British officers in Punjab, and called for their trial, the recall of Michael O'Dwyer and the Viceroy, Lord Chelmsford, and the repealing of repressive legislation.

=== Dyer's response and motivation ===
Dyer wrote an article in the Globe of 21 January 1921, entitled, "The Peril to the Empire". It commenced with "India does not want self-government. She does not understand it." Dyer wrote later that:

- "There should be an eleventh commandment in India - "Thou shalt not agitate'. All that the cultivator and the factory worker want is just and clear laws applicable to all alike. He does not always know why his passions have been roused and whether he is being misled, who is there to tell him but the Sahib? And now it seems that the Sahib is not allowed to tell him. He does not want an exchange of rulers."
- "India will not be desirous or capable of self-government for generations, and when self-government does come, it will not be the leaders of revolt who will rule. The very names of most of the extremists smell in the nostrils of Indian manhood."
- "Self-government for India is a horrible pretence which would set the people of the country at each other's throats long before the beginnings of constructive work were made possible. Under self-government, India would commit suicide; but our politicians would be guilty of murder as associates in the crime."
- "Gandhi will not lead India to capable self-government. The British Raj must continue, firm and unshaken in its administration of justice to all men, to carry out the job it has taken in hand."

In his official response to the Hunter commission that inquired into the shooting, Dyer was unremorseful and stated: "I think it quite possible that I could have dispersed the crowd without firing but they would have come back again and laughed, and I would have made, what I consider, a fool of myself."

However, in his account of the massacre, Nick Lloyd comments that although Dyer later claimed to have undertaken the massacre to "save" British India, he had had no such idea in his mind that fateful afternoon. As well as being "dazed and shaken up" – hardly the response of a soldier who had had murder in his mind – all the witnesses recall how Dyer "was unnerved and deeply upset about what had happened".

Nigel Collett – author of the biography The Butcher of Amritsar – is convinced that the Amritsar massacre preyed on Dyer's mind from the very day he opened fire. "He spent the rest of his life trying to justify himself. He persuaded himself it had been his duty to act as he did, but he could not persuade his soul that he had done right. It rotted his mind and, I am guessing here, added to his sickness."

Collett quotes Dyer on the motivations that drove him to act as he did: "It was no longer a question of merely dispersing the crowd but one of producing a sufficient moral effect, from a military point of view, not only on those who were present but more specially throughout the Punjab. There could be no question of undue severity. The mutineers had thrown out the challenge and the punishment, if administered at all, must be complete, unhesitating and immediate."

Historian Gordon Johnson comments that

... Dyer's actions ran counter to Army regulations. These required that force should be constrained by what was reasonable to achieve an immediate objective; minimum, not maximum, force should be deployed. Moreover, proper warning had to be given. On 13 April 1919, as demonstrated by Collett, Dyer ignored this. While he may have believed the Raj was threatened, and may have thought the mob was out to attack him and his soldiers, this does not justify his cavalier abuse of procedure and his indifference to Indian suffering. In so behaving, he brought not only death to the innocent but also destroyed himself and undermined the empire in which he took so much pride.

== Later life ==
Reginald Dyer pictured in 1920

Churchill, the then Secretary of State for War, wanted Dyer to be disciplined, but the Army Council superseded by him decided to allow Dyer to resign with no plan for further punishment. Following Churchill's speech defending the council's decision and a debate in Parliament, on 8 July 1920 MPs voted for the government by a majority of 247 to 37; a motion calling for approval of Dyer's actions was defeated by a majority of 230 to 129.

Having been born in present-day Pakistan and educated in Ireland, Dyer then settled in Britain. He was presented with a gift of £26,000 sterling, (equivalent to £1,004,734 in 2025), which emerged from the fund raised on his behalf by The Morning Post, a conservative, pro-imperialist newspaper which later merged with The Daily Telegraph. A "Thirteen Women Committee" was constituted to present "the Saviour of the Punjab with the sword of honour and a purse". Large contributions to the fund were made by civil servants and by British Army and Indian Army officers, although serving members of the military were not allowed to donate to political funds under the King's Regulations (para. 443).

The Morning Post had supported Dyer's action on the grounds that the massacre was necessary to "Protect the honour of European Women".

Many Indians, including Nobel Laureate Rabindranath Tagore, were outraged by the fund for Dyer, particularly due to the families of the victims killed at the Jallianwala Bagh, who were still fighting for government compensation. In the end, they received Rs 500 (then equal to £37.10s.0d; equivalent to £1,430 in 2025) for each victim.

Dyer acquired a farm at Ashton Fields, Ashton Keynes, Wiltshire, which was still given as his address when he died, although in 1925 he had bought a small cottage at Long Ashton on the outskirts of Bristol and spent his last two years there, while one of his sons lived at the farm.

Dyer suffered a series of strokes during the last years of his life and he became increasingly isolated due to the paralysis and speechlessness inflicted by his strokes. He died of cerebral haemorrhage and arteriosclerosis on 23 July 1927. On his deathbed, Dyer reportedly said:

So many people who knew the condition of Amritsar say I did right ... but so many others say I did wrong. I only want to die and know from my Maker whether I did right or wrong.

The Conservative-leaning Morning Post defended him in an article titled "The Man Who Saved India", where they wrote that Dyer "did his duty, regardless of consequences". The Liberal-supporting Westminster Gazette wrote a contrary opinion: "No British action, during the whole course of our history in India, has struck a severer blow to Indian faith in British justice than the massacre at Amritsar." Although still owning property in Wiltshire, Dyer died at his cottage in Somerset, St Martin's, Long Ashton, near Bristol. He left an estate valued at £11,941, equivalent to £648,584 in 2025.

== In popular culture ==
In 1977, Dyer was depicted in the Indian film Jallian Wala Bagh.

In the 1982 Oscar-winning film Gandhi, Dyer was portrayed by Edward Fox.

R. E. Dyer was a character in Salman Rushdie's 1981 novel Midnight’s Children, which dramatises the Amritsar massacre.

Dyer's actions in Amritsar are mentioned in The Great Indian Novel by Shashi Tharoor and by Nigel Collett in his 2005 historical biography The Butcher of Amritsar.

Dyer was also depicted in Indian films such as The Legend of Bhagat Singh (2002), and Sardar Udham (2021).

Dyer was portrayed by Alex Reece in the 2025 web series The Waking of a Nation.

Dyer was portrayed by Simon Paisley Day in the 2025 film Kesari Chapter 2.

== Sources ==
- Colvin, Ian (1929). The Life Of General Dyer. London: William Blackwood And Sons.
- Collett, Nigel (2006). The Butcher of Amritsar: General Reginald Dyer. A&C Black. ISBN 978-1-85285-575-8.
