= Ayya (smartphone) =

Russian smartphone brand from Rostec

AYYA is a smartphone series developed by Rostec. The first and only device in the series as of 2024 is the AYYA T1 which released on 28 October 2021 with Android 11 and plans to upgrade to Aurora OS. The T1 sold poorly and was affected by a CPU chip undersupply issue due in part to the supplier TSMC halting trade with Russia in response to the 2022 invasion of Ukraine. It has a button which disables the microphone and cameras.

== History ==
At the end of October 2021 the first sales of the AYYA T1 smartphone began in Russia. Then from the domestic smartphone, there was only software that is legally required for installation.

In March 2022, a modification of AYYA T1 appeared on the Aurora OS for legal entities (corporate customers).

In March 2023, the media reported that retail sales of the AYYA T1 smartphone did not exceed 1 thousand units in 2 years out of a batch of 5 thousand units produced.

== Product series ==
- AYYA T1: 19,000 rubles or $200 USD
  - 6.56-inch screen, two main cameras (12 and 5 MP), a 13 MP front camera, a MediaTek Helio P70 processor, 4 GB of RAM, and 64 GB of built-in memory with 128 GB of expansion
- AYYA T2 is under development as of 2023
