= Harish Puri =

Political scientist

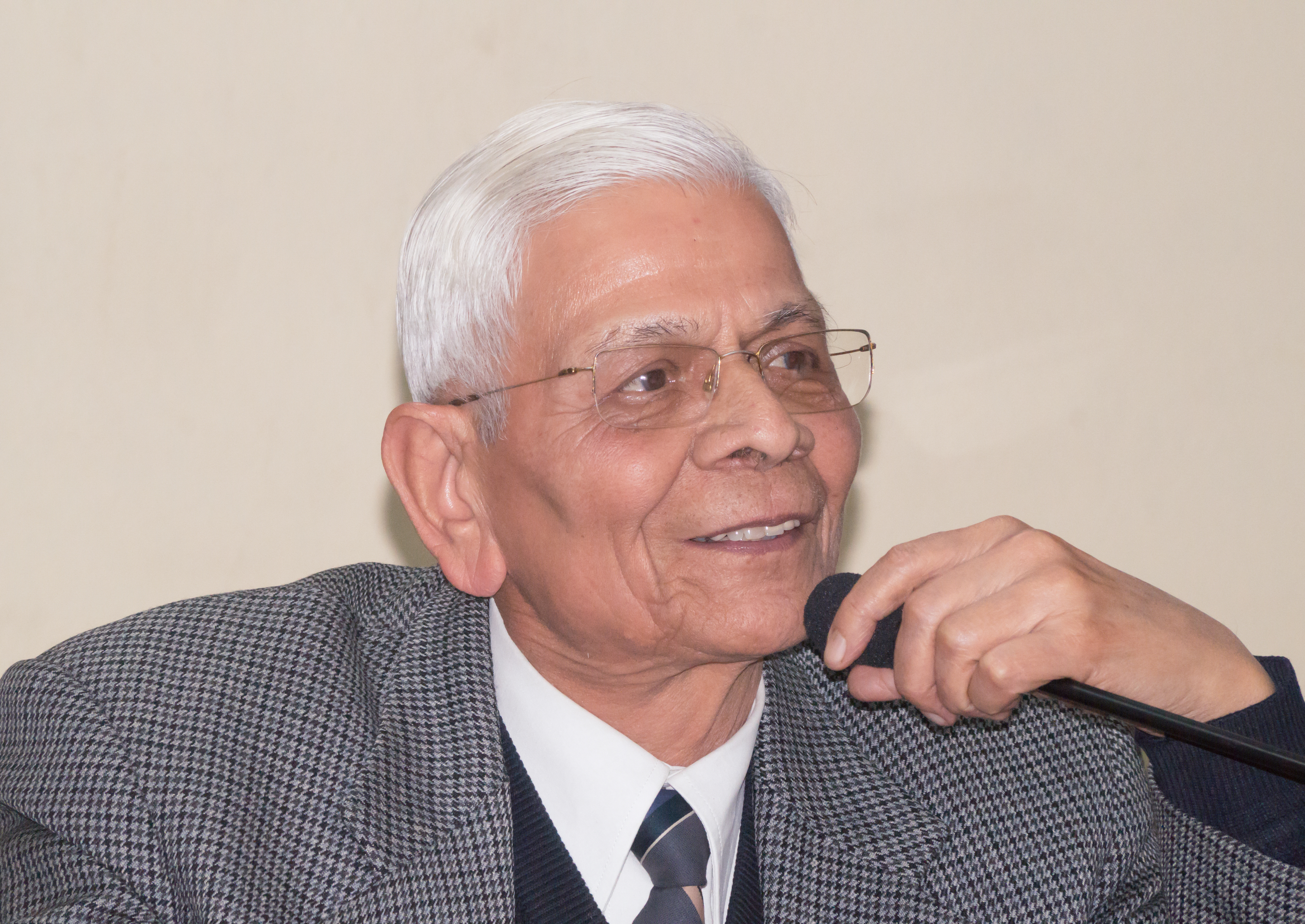
- Born: 4 April 1938 (age 88)
- Citizenship: Indian
- Occupations: Political scientist and historian
- Employer: Guru Nanak Dev University

Harish K. Puri (born 4 April 1938) is a Punjabi political scientist and historian. He retired as a professor of political science and the chairman of Dr. B. R. Ambedkar Chair from Guru Nanak Dev University. His areas of focus are the Dalit issues of Punjab, Mahatma Gandhi, and the Ghadar Movement.

== Biography ==
Puri received a Fulbright scholarship in 1990-91, during which he researched on Ghadar Movement: Ideology Organization Strategy at the University of California, Berkeley. He received Shastri Indo-Canadian Senior Fellowship from the University of British Columbia.

== Works ==
- Puri, Harish K. (2011). Ghadar Movement. National Book Trust. ISBN 9788123762821.
- Puri, Harish K. (2004). Dalits in Regional Context. Rawat Publications. ISBN 9788170338710.
- Puri, Harish K.; Judge, Paramjit Singh; Sekhon, Jagrup Singh (1999). Terrorism in Punjab: Understanding Grassroots Reality. Har-Anand Publications. ISBN 9788124106198.
