= Ayya, Kapurthala =

Ayya
- Village
- Location in Punjab, India Ayya (India)
- Coordinates: 31.238312°N 75.379110°E
- Country: India
- State: Punjab
- District: Kapurthala

Government
  - Type: Panchayati raj (India)
  - Body: Gram panchayat

Population (2011)
  - Total: 119
- Sex ratio 70/49♂/♀

Languages
  - Official: Punjabi
  - Other spoken: Hindi
- Time zone: UTC+5:30 (IST)
- PIN: 144625
- Telephone code: 01822
- ISO 3166 code: IN-PB
- Vehicle registration: PB-09
- Website: kapurthala.gov.in

Ayya is a village in Kapurthala district of Punjab State, India. It is located 19 kilometres (12 mi) from Kapurthala, which is both district and sub-district headquarters of Ayya. The village is administrated by a Sarpanch, who is an elected representative.

== Demography ==
According to the report published by Census India in 2011, Ayya has a total number of 23 houses and population of 119 of which include 70 males and 49 females. Literacy rate of Ayya is 66.36%, lower than state average of 75.84%. The population of children under the age of 6 years is 9 which is 7.56% of total population of Ayya, and child sex ratio is approximately 1250 higher than state average of 846.

== Population data ==
| Particulars | Total | Male | Female |
|---|---|---|---|
| Total No. of Houses | 23 | - | - |
| Population | 119 | 70 | 49 |
| Child (0-6) | 9 | 4 | 5 |
| Schedule Caste | 24 | 17 | 7 |
| Schedule Tribe | 0 | 0 | 0 |
| Literacy | 66.36 % | 69.70 % | 61.36 % |
| Total Workers | 63 | 52 | 11 |
| Main Worker | 35 | 0 | 0 |
| Marginal Worker | 28 | 20 | 8 |

== Air travel connectivity ==
The closest airport to the village is Sri Guru Ram Dass Jee International Airport.
