= Marcella Sherwood =

English missionary (c.1878–1966)

- Born: Frances Marcella Sherwood c. 1878; Kimberworth, Rotherham, South Yorkshire, England
- Died: 14 May 1966 (aged 87–88)
- Occupation: Missionary

Frances Marcella Sherwood, commonly known as Marcella Sherwood (c.1878 – 14 May 1966), was an English missionary with the Church of England Zenana Missionary Society, remembered for her connection to Reginald Dyer’s Crawling Order following her assault in Amritsar on 10 April 1919 during the Punjab disturbances.

== Early life ==
Frances Marcella Sherwood, commonly known as Marcella, was born in early 1878 in Kimberworth, Rotherham, South Yorkshire. She was one of four daughters and two sons of Edward Purvis Sherwood, sometime rector of Baginton, Warwick.

Sherwood joined the Church of England Zenana Missionary Society in 1904, and was first posted to work at Batala, Punjab, where she remained until being furloughed back to England in 1915. When she returned to India, she joined the mission at Amritsar. For a short while she taught at a school for girls in Singapore.

== Amritsar 1919 ==
On 10 April 1919, Sherwood, then aged about 40 years, and superintendent of the city mission schools, cycled alone into the Ahluwia neighbourhood of Amritsar to close Bagian di Katra School, one of five schools she was responsible for. Although warned by locals not to go further, she continued until she had to abandon her bike and run, until she was caught and beaten by kicks, sticks and shoes by a group of Indian men who left her once they believed her to be dead.

On 18 April, Deputy Superintendent of police, Reginald C. A. Plomer, was sent with military troops to the street where Sherwood was attacked, with the task to identify the attackers, by interrogating its residents . Dyer visited Sherwood at Ram Bagh on 19 April, and in response, created the Crawling Order.

Sherwood declined the full compensation offered from the British Government in India. When asked by the Coventry Standard as to why she declined it she replied "I hear not the cries of 'kill kill' in that street but the shouts of leave her alone, she is a woman, raised in another street. It was Indians who rescued me, an Indian house that gave me shelter, Indian hands that first dressed my wounds, that is full compensation. I would not have it otherwise". She accepted ₹1,500 in compensation for medical expenses and for her damaged bicycle and watch.

== Later life ==
Once recovered, Sherwood returned to India to work in Lahore, and retired from her missionary to assist refugees of partition. In her later years she lived in England with her sisters Grace and Amy.

== Popular culture ==
Sherwood is mentioned in A Passage to India.

== Death ==
Sherwood outlived her sisters and died on 14 May 1966. Her funeral took place at Church of St Nicholas, Staffordshire.

== Bibliography ==
- Wagner, Kim A. (2019). Amritsar 1919: An Empire of Fear & the Making of a Massacre. Yale University Press. ISBN 978-0-300-24546-2.
