= Appan Menon =

Indian journalist

- Appan Menon, captured by The Times of India photographer in New Delhi on 7 September 1990
- Born: 17 September 1947
- Died: 28 June 1996 (aged 48); New Delhi, India
- Occupations: News editor and anchor NDTV
- Known for: The World This Week
- Spouse: Kamala Menon
- Children: 2

Appan Menon (17 September 1947 – 28 June 1996) was a senior Indian print and television journalist, most known News editor and anchor with NDTV. He anchored the international news show The World This Week on Doordarshan in 1980s and moved to NDTV when it was established in 1988.

== Career ==
Starting as an agency reporter, Menon worked with news agencies PTI and UNI, and also covered the United Nations Headquarters for Inter Press Service and specialized in Latin American politics. Then he moved to print media working with The Hindu newspaper and Frontline magazine. Eventually he moved to television, where he anchored The World This Week first with state-run Doordarshan and subsequently with NDTV and became its leading news anchor along with Prannoy Roy

He died in his sleep early morning on 28 June 1996 at the age of 48, at the time of death he was news editor with NDTV. He was survived by his wife Kamala Menon and two children. Republic TV Editor-in-chief Arnab Goswami has said that he owed Menon a lot for his career.

== Appan Menon Memorial Award ==
After his death, the Appan Menon Memorial Trust was set up in 1996 in memory of Menon. The Appan Menon Award for Journalism is awarded annually by the trust to journalists "having special interest in international affairs or developmental issues with an Indian viewpoint". The award is announced on 17 September, coinciding with his birth anniversary.
