= Reputation of Douglas Haig =

The Right Honourable The Earl Haig
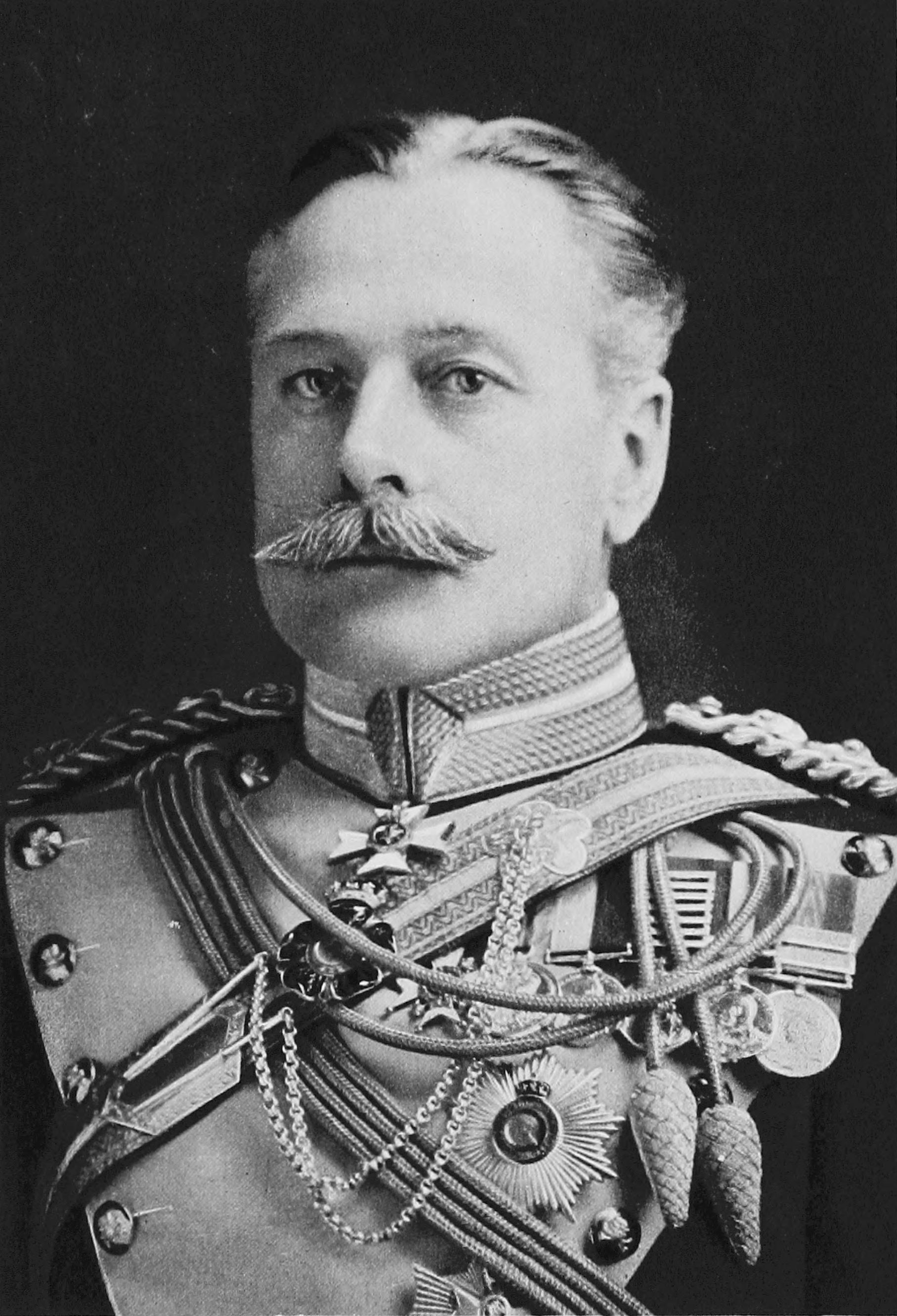
- Haig in 1917
- Born: 19 June 1861; Charlotte Square, Edinburgh, Scotland
- Died: 29 January 1928 (aged 66); 21 Prince's Gate, London, England
- Military career
- Allegiance: United Kingdom
- Branch: British Army
- Service years: 1884–1920
- Rank: Field Marshal

Field Marshal Douglas Haig, 1st Earl Haig (19 June 1861 – 29 January 1928) led the British Expeditionary Force during World War I. His reputation remains controversial, and his competency during the war is still the subject of academic debate.

Although a popular commander during the immediate post-war years, with his funeral becoming a day of national mourning, Haig also became an object of criticism for his leadership of the BEF on the Western Front. He was criticised by politicians such as Winston Churchill and David Lloyd George, and by influential historians such as Basil Liddell Hart. Some regard him as representing the very concept of class-based incompetent commanders, stating that he was unable to grasp modern tactics and technologies, and criticism of Haig is sometimes hard to disentangle from criticisms of the war itself. However, many veterans praised Haig's leadership and since the 1980s some historians have argued that the public hatred in which Haig's name had come to be held failed to recognise the adoption of new tactics and technologies by forces under his command, or the important role played by the British forces in the Allied victory of 1918, and that the high casualties suffered were a function of the tactical and strategic realities of the time.

== Reputation ==
=== Post-war opinion ===
After the war, Haig was praised by the American General of the Armies John J. Pershing, the wartime commander of the American Expeditionary Forces, who remarked that Haig was "the man who won the war." He was also publicly lauded as the leader of a victorious army. His funeral in 1928 was a huge state occasion.

However, after his death, Haig—and the generation of British generals he was deemed to represent—came under increasing criticism. Some of these critiques were directed at what was said to be his excessive focus on the Western Front (aligning with the "westerner" rather than "easterner" school of thought), while others targeted his alleged poor decision-making and resistance to innovation, which led to excessive casualties among British troops under his command. Many of Haig's critics were younger officers who had served in the First World War.

Arthur Conan Doyle (six volumes, 1916–20) and John Buchan (four volumes, 1921–22) published histories of the war that were largely supportive of Haig and the "westerner" perspective.

=== Haig's own case ===
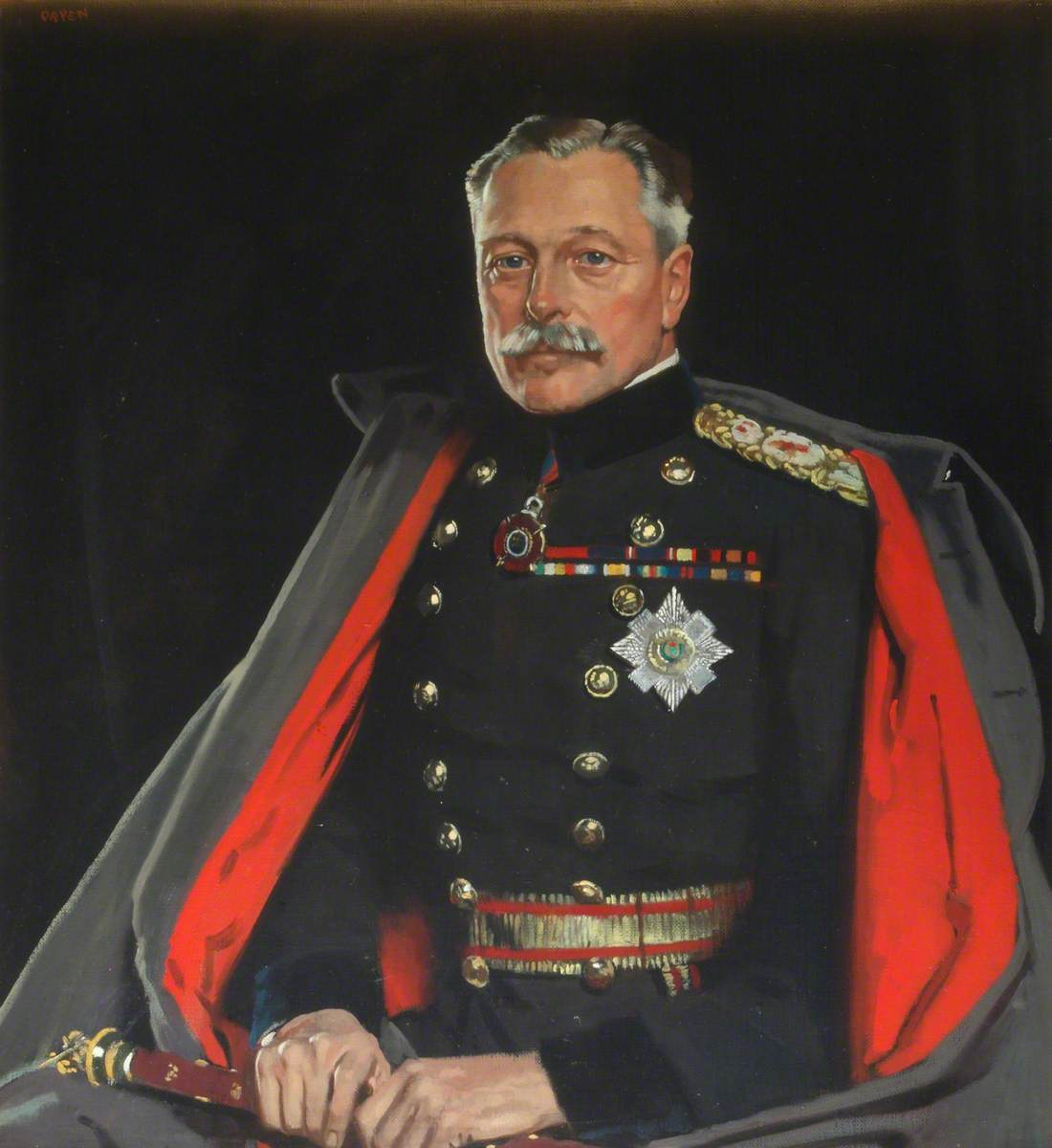
Portrait of Earl Haig by William Orpen, 1921

Haig appeared as himself in the films Under Four Flags (1918) and Remembrance (1927).

In his "Final Despatch" of 21 March 1919, Haig sought to shape the terms of the debate and preempt criticism. According to historian Gary Sheffield, Haig argued that the war on the Western Front had been "a single continuous campaign," made lengthy and costly by the time needed to train a large British force and the absence of flanking opportunities. Haig contended that offensives were necessary because "a purely defensive attitude can never bring about a successful decision," and acknowledged that while casualties were heavy, they were "no larger than were to be expected." He further asserted that "the victories of the summer and autumn of 1918 (were) directly dependent upon the two years of stubborn fighting that preceded them." Sheffield writes that Haig's argument was "fundamentally correct" and that "much of (Haig's case) has withstood nearly nine decades of criticism," though he also notes an element of rationalization, as evidence, including Haig's diary, suggests that Haig had hoped to achieve decisive victory at various times during the Somme and Third Ypres campaigns.

Haig was reportedly offered £100,000 for his memoirs but declined to write any. It has been suggested that he may have been influenced by the uproar caused by "1914", the tendentious memoirs of Field Marshal French, his predecessor as Commander-in-Chief of the BEF. However, he privately ensured that his point of view reached the public in response to criticisms from Lloyd George and others. In August 1919, Haig wrote to John St Loe Strachey, editor of The Spectator, in response to a speech by Lloyd George. Haig argued that 1917 was "the most critical period of the war... it was only the continuous attacks of the British Army" which saved the Allies. Haig supported Boraston & Dewar's early 1920s work, which claimed that his critics knew as much about military operations as they did about "the Basque language." These critics included Lovat Fraser, who wrote the article "Where Haig Went Wrong – Vast and Useless Waste of Life in the Great War" in the Sunday Pictorial (3 Dec 1922).

=== Churchill ===
Several bestselling memoirs by politicians were highly critical of Haig. Winston Churchill's The World Crisis was written during Haig's lifetime (six volumes, 1923–29). Written in what Brian Bond describes as a "majestic prose style" and using documents not available to the public until the 1960s, the work sold well enough to fund the completion of Churchill's house at Chartwell. Churchill was an "Easterner" and spent much of the book defending his own attack on the Dardanelles. He wrote that Haig was "the first officer of the British army" in experience and ability, and "he had no rivals," which helped his strength of character in holding his vast responsibilities, but that nobody was equal to the immense challenges of the war.

In the chapter "The Blood Test," Churchill, building on arguments he had submitted to the Cabinet in the summer of 1916, argued that Allied losses exceeded German losses on the Western Front (not the view of GHQ at the time but generally accepted now), and that the campaigns of 1916 were "a welter of slaughter" that weakened the Allied lead over the Germans. He claimed that at the Battle of the Somme, "no strategical advantages of any kind had been gained" apart from relieving pressure on Verdun, although he admitted the effect of losses on German morale and combat effectiveness. In his 1937 essays Great Contemporaries, Churchill later likened Haig to a surgeon who had to act dispassionately for the long-term good of the patient, no matter how messy the short-term means. In another passage of The World Crisis, he wrote that massed tank attacks as at Cambrai could have been used as an alternative to blocking enemy machine-gun fire with "the breasts of brave men." This view is now regarded as unrealistic.

Churchill estimated the casualties of the Third Ypres ("a sombre experiment that had failed disastrously") at over 400,000, quoting Ferdinand Foch's warning of the folly of taking on "Boche & Boue" (Germans and mud) simultaneously. He argued that the soldiers "took all they required from Britain. They wore down alike the manhood and the guns of the British Army almost to destruction. They did so in the face of the plainest warnings and arguments which they could not answer." Churchill was if anything more critical of Robertson, quoting the latter's letter to Haig of 27 September 1917, where Robertson wrote that with Russia dropping out of the war he was advising the Government that there should be further attacks at Ypres out of instinct rather than for any belief that Haig could win, and writing that Robertson "was an outstanding military personality. His vision as a strategist was not profound... he had no ideas of his own, but a sensible judgement negative in bias."

Haig sent Churchill extracts from his diaries and commented on drafts, to which Churchill was willing to make amendments. He told Haig (20 November 1926) that he was "a convinced and outspoken opponent to our offensive policy at Loos, on the Somme and at Passchendaele." Although Haig thought Churchill's views on the Somme and Third Ypres "most mischievous," he was willing to accept criticism for his command record but claimed that the decisions he took in August and September 1918 were responsible for the war ending in November.

However, Churchill also wrote that although the Allied offensives up until August 1918 had been "as hopeless as they were disastrous," and men of fifty had already been called up due to the manpower shortage, "Haig and Foch were vindicated in the end," and that the Hundred Days "will excite the wonder of future generations." Churchill (23 November 1926) admitted to Beaverbrook, who thought him too willing to praise Haig, that "subsequent study of the war has led me to think a good deal better of Haig than I did at the time. It is absolutely certain there was no one who could have taken his place."

=== Lloyd George ===
Lloyd George pulled fewer punches in his War Memoirs, published in 1933–36 when Haig was deceased and Lloyd George was no longer likely to return to power. Historian Brian Bond writes that this work "did the most damage to the generals." Lloyd George criticized their "narrow, selfish and unimaginative strategy ... ghastly butchery ... vain and insane offensives" which, he argued, brought the Allies "almost to the rim of catastrophe ... saved largely by the incredible folly of our foes." He accused Haig of premature use of tanks although he accepted that there was "no conspicuous officer better qualified for higher command." In Chapter 89, Lloyd George scorned the recently published extracts from Haig's diaries, which he claimed were "carefully edited" by Haig's Official Biographer Duff Cooper. He described Haig as "intellectually and temperamentally unequal to his task" and "second-rate" compared to Foch, though he conceded that Haig was "above the average for his profession—perhaps more in industry than intelligence." He attributed his distrust of Haig's capacity to fill his "immense role" to Haig's lack of a clear grasp even of the Western Front (likening him to "the blind King of Bohemia at Crecy"), let alone the needs of other fronts, and his inability, given his preference for being surrounded by courteous "gentlemen", to select good advisers. He also criticised Haig for lacking the personal magnetism of a great commander, for his intrigues against his predecessor Sir John French, and his willingness to scapegoat Hubert Gough for the defeat of March 1918 (although he had actually defended him, and the alternative would probably have been Haig's own dismissal), and his claims to have subsequently accepted the appointment of Foch as Allied Generalissimo, a move to which Lloyd George claimed Haig in fact to have been opposed. On another occasion he is said to have described Haig as "brilliant—to the top of his boots". Lloyd George's biographer John Grigg (2002) suggested that Lloyd George's vitriolic tone may have stemmed from a guilty conscience for not having intervened to stop the Passchendaele Offensive. John Terraine found a "faint stirring of consciousness" in the "shrill venom" with which Lloyd George sought to "exculpate himself" after destroying trust between politicians and soldiers through the Nivelle Affair, making it impossible for Robertson to raise his concerns about the Third Ypres Offensive with the Prime Minister. Terraine called the memoirs "a document as shabby as his behaviour at Calais."

De Groot, a critical modern biographer of Haig, writes that Lloyd George's "highly successful but hopelessly inaccurate" War Memoirs gave "energy, respectability, and authority" to the "Lions led by donkeys" school of thought. Groot argues that Lloyd George's "simple and reassuring" message, which portrayed Haig as a mediocre general who was somehow clever enough to mislead the clever politicians, avoids assessing deeper questions of "societal responsibility" for the war and takes refuge in the "comfortable fantasy that if only a genius had been available things would have been so different."

=== Liddell Hart ===
B. H. Liddell Hart, a military historian who had been wounded during World War I, initially admired Haig but later became an unremitting critic. Liddell Hart wrote in his diary that Haig was "a man of supreme egoism and utter lack of scruple—who, to his overweening ambition, sacrificed hundreds of thousands of men." He further accused Haig of betraying his devoted assistants and the government he served, describing him as a man who "gained his ends by trickery of a kind that was not merely immoral but criminal." Liddell Hart was an "easterner" who argued for the "British Way of Warfare": the "indirect approach", more emphasis on other fronts, hence his study of the scholar-warrior T. E. Lawrence, and a greater focus on blockade. Liddell Hart, who "bestrode British military history like a colossus" over decades of writing, kept extensive archives and often supported newer writers. He advised Lloyd George on his War Memoirs but welcomed controversy and was capable of writing fair assessments of Haig or the Hundred Days later in life. Despite his interest in the Somme and tanks, Liddell Hart paid less attention to the artillery, logistics, and staff work that dominated British tactics at the time, areas that modern historians have re-examined.

Liddell Hart criticised Haig for the lack of realism of his breakthrough plans at the Somme in 1916 – hoping to roll up the front as far north as Arras, and advance as far east as Cambrai, for his premature use of tanks in September 1916, supposedly over the protests of Lloyd George (War Minister) and Edwin Montagu (Minister of Munitions), for attacking at Ypres ("a synonym for military failure") in 1917 in the face of "formidable facts" that eighty years' worth of weather statistics showed that the autumn would be wet (this view is not nowadays accepted) and that shelling would destroy the drainage system anyway, and for the lack of reserves to exploit at Cambrai. He also accused Haig of prolonging the war by blocking an attempt to begin strategic bombing.

Liddell Hart's arguments are not widely supported by modern historians. Brian Bond, for example, finds Churchill's and Liddell Hart's arguments about tanks "to say the least, dubious." J. F. C. Fuller, a critic of Haig, commented on Liddell Hart's draft that "the use of tanks on 15 September 1916 was not a mistake ... no peace test can equal a war test". Although a critic of Passchendaele (he wrote the preface to Leon Wolff's highly critical book "In Flanders Fields") Fuller also wrote of Haig, "it must stand to his credit ... no man can deny that during the last hundred days of the war he fitted events as a hand fitted a glove."

Liddell Hart claimed that Haig had been overly cautious as a column commander in the Second Boer War and would have been better suited as a staff officer rather than a commander. However, in mitigation, the static conditions of the Western Front changed the role of a commander into that of a "super staff officer."

=== Opinion between the Wars ===
Despite some criticisms, at the time of Haig's death, the battles of 1916-17 were still widely perceived as "costly victories" rather than "fruitless disasters," a view that some military historians have partially returned to. Haig did not live to see the flood of "disillusioned" war literature beginning in the late 1920s and the swing of public opinion almost towards pacifism. Some of this literature was slightly fictionalized, such as All Quiet on the Western Front (1929)—though Remarque's own military service had been brief in Flanders in mid-1917, while Graves admitted to mixing up and spicing up incidents to make Goodbye to All That a bestseller.

It is probably incorrect to imagine that soldiers had a "true" view while the public held a false one based on propaganda, nor was censorship particularly strong—newspapers had to appeal to public opinion. The Parliamentary Recruitment Committee had only 1% of the annual commercial poster advertising budget. Nick Hiley, in the Imperial War Museum Review 1997, argues that there is no evidence of official involvement in famous recruitment posters such as "Your Country Needs You" or "Daddy, What Did You Do In the Great War?".

It is also an oversimplification to see the writers of that period as anti-war. Sassoon (like Wilfred Owen, a decorated combat veteran) aimed his bile at profiteers, shirkers, clerics, pro-war women, and recognised he was moved by his unhealthy lifestyle in Blighty, although persuaded by Bertrand Russell and H. G. Wells that war had become one of conquest and aggression. Graves (who tried to reenlist in September 1939) and R. C. Sherriff (but not his pacifist producer Maurice Browne) resented being classed as "anti-war."

It has been suggested that the 1930s writers had more influence in the 1960s than in their own time. Wilfred Owen was little known in 1930, whereas Rupert Brooke was more popular then than now. "Anti-war" writing was a minority of war writing, and many intellectual writers were ambivalent about their role in the war; they were disturbed at how much they had enjoyed it. In the interwar period, films that portrayed the war as patriotic were far more common. Correlli Barnett argued that the anti-war literature of the 1930s helped fuel appeasement, although Brian Bond does not fully accept this.

=== Duff Cooper and other defenders of Haig ===
Duff Cooper, keen to make a literary name for himself, was approached by Haig's executors in March 1933 to write his official biography after several military and literary figures had declined. Cooper insisted on full access to Haig's papers and relied heavily on Haig's (as yet unpublished) diaries.

Haig's widow, for reasons still unclear, was upset and wrote a biography of her own. Cooper's publishers, Faber and Faber, delayed its publication with legal action until after Cooper had published his two volumes in 1935 and 1936. Lady Haig's unpublished manuscript is in the Haig Papers. She later wrote a personal memoir, The Man I Knew, and was also critical of John Charteris' 1928 biography.

Stephen Heathorn describes Cooper's biography as "the apogee of the admiring biography [of Haig]," following in the tradition of previous works by Dewar & Boraston (1922), George Arthur (1928), and John Charteris (1929). He stressed Haig's strong and upright character, as if he were writing about a Victorian hero. He wrote that there was "no room for thoughts of petty malice or of mean revenge in that high and honourable man" (Vol. 2, p. 98) and that "in moral stature Haig was a giant" (pp. 440–1). David Lloyd George's memoirs were appearing as Cooper was writing, and some of his book was devoted to addressing his arguments. Cooper argued that Haig's offensive on the Somme saved the French at Verdun, that Haig improved Anglo-French relations, and that he defeated the Germans through inflicting attrition on them at the Somme and Third Ypres. The book received many generous reviews and remained the leading biography of Haig until John Terraine's The Educated Soldier in 1963. Harold Temperley wrote, "the silent one has spoken at last," recognising that the book was mainly Haig's words. C. R. M. F. Cruttwell thought it proved that Haig was not an intriguer. Fifteen years later, Cooper admitted to Robert Blake, the editor of Haig's Private Papers (1952), that he had been influenced by the politics of the 1930s and the desire to facilitate Anglo-French rapprochement as Germany rearmed.

Historians' views of Haig would be dramatically changed by the publication of his Private Papers in 1952, which revealed his political intrigues and his private, uncharitable views of various British officers and politicians and of the French in general. Modern views of Cooper's biography are less favourable: George Egerton, writing in The Journal of Modern History in 1988, detected a conflict between Cooper the writer, who concealed the degree to which Haig, like everybody else, was dwarfed by events, and the historian, who was too honest to pretend he dominated them.

Haig's generalship was also defended by E. K. G. Sixsmith and James Marshall-Cornwall. One of Haig's staunchest defenders was John Terraine, who published a biography of Haig (The Educated Soldier) in 1963, in which Haig was portrayed as a "Great Captain" of the calibre of the Duke of Marlborough or the Duke of Wellington. Terraine, taking his cue from Haig's "Final Despatch," also argued that Haig pursued the only possible strategy given the situation the armies were in: that of attrition, which wore down the German army and delivered the coup de grâce of 1918. Gary Sheffield stated that although Terraine's arguments about Haig have been much attacked over the last forty years, Terraine's thesis "has yet to be demolished."

=== Criticism after World War Two ===
Brian Bond argues that popular notions of World War I were largely shaped in the 1960s, amidst fear of nuclear war, the end of National Service, Britain's decline as a Great Power, and the US defeat in Vietnam. The veterans grew old (many of them were interviewed in the TV series The Great War (1964), which, although scripted by Terraine, fuelled anti-war sentiment that was not his intention). Armistice Day fell into disrepute. The Kaiser's Germany, although militaristic, had clearly been less evil than Hitler's, but had only been checked at great British cost, whereas Hitler was crushed at less British cost.

A. J. P. Taylor's First World War was "probably the most widely read historical work on the war as a whole in English." He was helped by Liddell Hart but irritated him by becoming a "westerner." Taylor argued that the war was a senseless accident and that at Third Ypres "failure was obvious by the end of the first day to everyone except Haig. Third Ypres was the blindest slaughter of a blind war. Some of the Flanders mud sticks also to Lloyd George (p146, 148)" However, he stressed that the war achieved results (liberating Belgium), and argued that poor leadership was "not confined to the British, or to soldiers... the war was beyond the capacity of soldiers and statesmen alike." (p. 220).

Although during Haig's lifetime and for many years afterwards, Third Ypres was regarded as the main blot on his reputation, Martin Middlebrook reawakened public interest in the Somme with his 1971 study.

=== Modern historians ===
Paul Fussell, a literary historian, in The Great War and Modern Memory, writes: "Although one doesn't want to be too hard on Haig... who has been well calumniated already... it must be said that it now appears... the war was testing the... usefulness of the earnest Scottish character in a situation demanding the military equivalent of wit and invention. Haig had none. He was stubborn, self-righteous, inflexible, intolerant—especially of the French—and quite humourless... Indeed, one powerful legacy of Haig's performance is the conviction among the imaginative and intelligent today of the unredeemable defectiveness of all civil and military leaders. Haig could be said to have established the paradigm."

While acknowledging that all the WWI generals were "a hard lot" and that Haig was more competent than Sir John French, and that he had become "an Aunt Sally to playwrights, film directors and television documentary makers committed to the view that the First World War exposed the oppressiveness of the British class structure", John Keegan wrote that in his "public manner and private diaries no concern for human suffering was or is discernible... (he had) nothing whatsoever of the common touch," although much of this is because the "appearances, attitudes, spoken pronouncements, written legacy" of Haig's generation of generals do not appeal to modern attitudes. Keegan rejects as unfair Lloyd George's sneer that the tendency of senior generals to stay well behind the lines was one of the "debatable novelties of modern warfare": in fact, 56 British generals were killed in WWI, as opposed to 22 in WWII (admittedly, these were mostly brigade and division commanders rather than more senior generals, and in WWII brigadiers no longer counted as generals). The state of communications (lack of radio, phone lines very difficult to maintain in the front lines) made it more practical for senior generals to be far in the rear where they could interpret such telephone information as they had.

Australian historian Les Carlyon argues that while Haig was slow to adapt to the correct use of artillery in sufficient quantities to support infantry attacks and was generally sceptical that the science of such doctrine had much place in military theory, he was fully supportive of excellent corps and field commanders such as Herbert Plumer, Arthur Currie, and John Monash, who seemed to best grasp and exercise these concepts, especially later in the war. Carlyon also points out that there is a case to answer for his support of more dubious commanders such as Ian Hamilton, Aylmer Hunter-Weston, and Hubert Gough.

Prior & Wilson speculate that if Haig had been a German general, "he might have played a role in provoking a great war and waging it for grandiose purposes and by reckless means," but they argue that in the UK, the main decisions that decided the nature of the war—going to war, building a mass army, introducing conscription, and balancing efforts between fronts—were taken by politicians. Throughout their books on the Somme (2005), Third Ypres (1996) (and Gallipoli (2010), a campaign in which Haig was not involved), they criticise the politicians for agreeing to offensives and failing to supervise them, although they are also critical of Haig for excessive and unrealistic emphasis on breakthrough. Prior and Wilson argue that there is no evidence that Haig ever plotted against Lloyd George, despite provocation during the Nivelle Affair, and indeed that he declined to do so during the Maurice Affair.

Robin Neillands claimed that the hatred in which Haig had come to be held by people born after his death—compared to his popularity in his own lifetime—reflected his characteristics as a Lowland Scot: tough and resolute, but dour and undemonstrative. Contrary to myth, he was not callous, sought innovation, and "deserve(d) a fairer judgement" than posterity had granted him.

==== New technologies ====
Haig's critics, such as Alan Clark and Gerard De Groot, argued that Haig failed to appreciate the critical science of artillery or supporting arms and that he was "unimaginative," although De Groot added that he has had the misfortune to be judged by the standards of a later age, in which the cause of Britain and her Empire are no longer thought worthy of such bloodshed.

Haig was branded as a reactionary on machine guns by Liddell Hart, who repeated Baker-Carr's claim that Haig had called the machine gun "a much overrated weapon"—in fact, Haig was an enthusiast for machine guns as far back as the 1898 Sudan campaign, had lobbied the Ministry of Munitions for more machine guns in June 1915, and stressed the importance of the Lewis Gun (light machine gun) at an army commanders conference in March 1916 (Terraine, Smoke & Fire 140–1). By the summer of 1918, infantry battalions had 30 Lewis Guns, up from 4 in 1916.

A famous Haig speech in 1925, in which Haig said that armies would still find a use for the "well-bred horse," was quoted out of context by Liddell Hart in 1959 and by many other writers since, to make Haig look like an idiot. In fact, it was a speech to the Royal Veterinary College, praising improvements that had greatly improved horse mortality rates from the high levels of the Boer War. Papers written by Haig in the 1920s show that, like most commentators at the time, he thought that a future war would not be like the Great War but that Britain might have to fight in other theatres (he suggested Afghanistan) where cavalry would be needed as they had been in Palestine and on the Eastern Front, and he was clear that future "cavalry" must be equipped with machine guns, armoured cars, and anti-tank guns.

J. F. C. Fuller wrote that Haig and senior generals watching a tank demonstration on 2 February 1918 were like "the heathen gods assembled to watch the entry of the new Christian era" and that they represented vested interests that tried to block innovation. This is untrue—Haig's diary for that day shows him to have been impressed by the demonstration and by the improvements in tank technology—but Sheffield argues that Fuller's claim that he could have won the war in 1919 with the massed use of the new Medium D tank was completely unrealistic.

Nowadays, it is argued that Haig was, if anything, overly keen on new technology—gas at Loos, tanks at Flers-Courcelette, even a death ray that a charlatan claimed to have invented—and provided "powerful institutional backing" to innovation. The first aircraft flew in 1903, but as early as 1909, Haig was commenting on its potential, and Trenchard, the RAF leader, always praised Haig.

Military historian Brian Bond argues that although Haig was not personally an expert on technology, he encouraged its use. Bond also refutes claims that Haig was a traditionalist who focused only on Cavalry tactics. Bond points out that the Cavalry represented less than three percent of the British Army by September 1916, while the British Army was the most mechanised force in the world by 1918, supported by the world's largest air force. The British Tank Corps was the world's first such force, and some 22,000 men served in it during the war. The Royal Artillery grew by 520 percent, and the engineers who implemented combined arms tactics grew by 2,212 percent. Bond argues that this hardly demonstrates a lack of imagination. Yet some historians, most notably John Keegan, refuse to accept that the British Army undertook a 'learning curve' of any sort; despite this example, Bourne explains that there "is little disagreement among scholars about the nature of the military transformation." Popular "media opinion" has failed to grasp that under Haig, the British Army adopted a very modern style of war in 1918, something very different from 1914, 1916, or even 1917.

==== Institutional learning ====
There is no consensus on the speed of the learning curve. Canadian historian Tim Travers remains an influential critic in this regard. In his view, there is no one "villain," but rather the pre-war regular army. Travers blames the management of early campaigns on the ethos of the pre-war officer corps. Travers argues that this ethos was based on privilege, with a hierarchy focused on self-preservation and maintaining individual reputations. As a consequence, the army was poorly positioned to adapt quickly. Travers claims that initiative was discouraged, making advancement along the learning curve slow. Travers points to the ethos of the army as being initially pro-human and anti-technological. The offensive spirit of the infantry, the quality of the soldier, rapid rifle fire, and the idea that the soldier was the most important aspect of the battlefield prevailed. The lessons of the Russo-Japanese War and the power of artillery were ignored, leading to tactical mistakes that would prove costly in the first half of the war. The tactics that Haig pursued (a breakthrough battle deep into enemy territory) were beyond the mobility and range of artillery, contributing to operational failures and heavy losses. Travers also criticises Haig and enemy commanders for (in his opinion) seeing battle as perfectly organised and something that could be planned perfectly, ignoring the concept of fog of war and confusion in battle. He argues that top-down command became impossible in the chaos of battle, forcing lower levels of command to be relied upon. Due to the lack of attention at this level in the early years of the war, a command vacuum was created in which GHQ became a spectator.

Some historians, like Bourne and Bond, regard this as too harsh. Haig belonged to the lower officer corps of the pre-war army, yet he progressed along with other commanders from battalion, brigade, division, and corps commanders of the Edwardian era to the army group and commanders-in-chief of the First World War. The advances in operational methods, technology, and tactical doctrine were implemented by these officers, Haig among them. Bourne and Bond argue that it is difficult to reconcile the commanders of 1918 with the dogma-ridden, unprofessional, unreflecting institution depicted by Tim Travers. They argue that he does not take into account the year 1918, when the officer corps succeeded in integrating infantry, artillery, armour, and aircraft in a war-winning operational method, a process which began on the Somme in 1916 and would have been impossible had these Edwardian officers been hostile to change in operational methodology and technological terms.

Haig told a conference (7 November 1915) that "the division is our real battle unit," and he wanted training controlled at this level of command. Wilson, a year later, thought Haig "stupid" for wanting training delegated from corps schools to divisions. There was to be no dedicated training section at GHQ until January 1917, and no central BEF Training Directorate until July 1918. By the summer of 1918, Haig was particularly keen on training men for open warfare, calling it "a platoon commander's war." He delegated responsibility for training to corps, while Army Commanders were responsible for making sure Corps carried out the training.

Haig played a key role in the institutional learning process, suggesting the use of infantry in buses to accompany the cavalry as far back as Loos in 1915, or attempting a hurricane barrage as far back as Aubers Ridge, although the weight of artillery was not yet available for this to work. He instituted regular Army Commanders' conferences to avoid French's remoteness. Haig supported Major-General "Curly" Birch in reorganising BEF artillery in late 1916, and Eric Geddes in organising BEF railways in the winter of 1916–17, as well as sponsoring machine guns, tanks, and aircraft. Until mid-1918, the British Army simply did not have the artillery to attack over as broad a front as Haig would have liked, or the logistical infrastructure to switch attacks between sectors—his plan to open an attack in Flanders in 1916 if the Somme attack stalled had been completely unrealistic (although Liddell Hart also criticised Haig for not breaking off at the Somme and attacking at Messines, 60 miles north instead, this ignored the need to stockpile millions of shells for an offensive—55 miles of new railway track had been laid for the Somme, leaving only 10 miles of unused track).

==== Critique of generalship ====
Sheffield argues that historians today tend to agree that Haig was an able administrator who presided over the development of the BEF, but opinion remains divided about his command record.

Sheffield argues that Haig was frequently too optimistic. Charteris was also optimistic—it is too simplistic to blame Charteris for telling his boss what he wanted to hear—and Haig's performance improved when Cox and Lawrence replaced Charteris and Kiggell. There were sometimes good reasons for optimism, for example in 1915 when breakthrough seemed likely as soon as recognised problems were fixed—except that the Germans also learned—or the decision to continue Third Ypres after Plumer's victory at Broodseide. Sheffield writes that Haig "personally bears a large share of the responsibility" for the First Day of the Somme (but also attributes some blame to "the system as a whole" for failing accurately to assess wire-cutting and Rawlinson for "sabotaging (Haig's) operational design") and for failing to supervise Gough properly at Third Ypres. Sheffield also argues that a successful commander needed ruthless determination and a willingness to take casualties, comparing Haig with the American Civil War General Ulysses S. Grant, and comparing both men favourably to Grant's predecessor George B. McClellan, whose lack of these qualities had arguably thrown away an earlier chance to end the American Civil War sooner. Haig consistently overestimated the likelihood of German morale collapsing, both on the battlefield (extrapolating from small numbers of examples) and on the German home front. Sheffield argues that Haig took "a calculated risk" that British morale would hold up and German morale collapse and was "eventually proved right." Haig did not plan exclusively for breakthrough and "can fairly be criticised for being taken in by false dawns," but nonetheless, it was his duty to plan for contingencies. Sheffield argues that Haig has received insufficient credit for the positive impact of his confidence in imminent victory in 1918, but this was partly his own fault for having "cried wolf" in previous years.

In Sheffield's view, Haig "lacked grip" and was poor at imposing his will on Army Commanders or enforcing coordination between units. This was partly an institutional weakness in the Army and doctrine that "the man on the spot" should decide. In 1918, the BEF functioned far more efficiently as generals and staff officers had learned their jobs. However, Haig was willing to encourage proven subordinates, such as Ivor Maxse, who was given a very free hand in the capture of Thiepval on 26 September 1916, which in the words of the French general Palat "marked the end of the British Army's apprenticeship." Pamphlets were written on tactical lessons learned, and Haig forgave Maxse his criticism of his poor performance as a brigadier in 1914.

Haig's influence in the 1920s was limited as another world war seemed unlikely. In WWII, there was a general feeling of "no more Passchendaeles." In Sheffield's opinion, the lack of realism of British desert tactics in 1941-2 owed a lot to the unrealistic ideas that manoeuvre could avoid casualties. Montgomery reverted to a policy of "colossal cracks," but Haig got no credit for this, as Montgomery presented himself as an "anti-Haig" (he later wrote, "Haig was unimaginative. Maybe he was competent according to his lights, but these were dim... nothing can excuse the casualties of the Somme and Passchendaele" (A History of Warfare Collins 1968 p494)). Second World War generals like Montgomery and Slim presented themselves as "People's Generals," dressing informally, adopting a matey public persona, and addressing troops as if they were politicians electioneering. Improvements in radio technology meant that senior generals of WWII could be based, and be seen to be based, close to the front lines rather than in chateaux. Haig was a man of his times, whose austere personality and acceptance of high casualties do not appeal to modern sensibilities. Sheffield argues that Haig must be judged according to his own times, and that he deserves credit for his work in reforming the army under Haldane, for presiding over the development of the BEF into a war-winning force, and for his work with war veterans after the war.

==== Casualties ====
While Haig is often criticised for the high casualties in his offensives, it is argued by some historians that this was largely a function of the size of the battles, as his forces were engaging the main body of the German Army on the Western Front, and that no realistic alternative existed ("although Haig did make mistakes which increased casualties... the scope to keep the casualty bill low was limited"). Although total deaths in the Second World War were far higher than in the First, British deaths were lower because Britain was fighting mainly peripheral campaigns in the Mediterranean for much of the Second World War, involving relatively few British troops, while most of the land fighting took place between Germany and the USSR (the Soviets suffered roughly as many dead, not including civilians, as every country in World War One combined). When British forces engaged in a major battle in Normandy in 1944, total losses were fewer than on the Somme in 1916, as Normandy was around half the length and less than half the size, but casualties per unit per week were broadly similar. David French observes that British daily loss rates at Normandy—a battle in which divisions lost up to three-quarters of their combat infantry—were similar to those of Third Ypres in 1917, while average battalion casualty rates in 1944-5 (100 men per week) were similar to those of the First World War.

John Terraine wrote: "It is important when we feel our emotions rightly swelling over the losses of 1914-18 to remember that in 1939-45 the world losses were probably over four times as many... the British task was entirely different, which is why the (British) loss of life was so different: about 350,000 in 1939-45 and about 750,000 (British deaths, 1 million including the Empire) in 1914-18... The casualty statistics of the Great War... tell us... virtually nothing about the quality of... British generals. The statistics show that... the British losses in great battles were generally about the same as anyone else's." In the same article, he argued that British perceptions were coloured by the terrible losses of 1 July 1916 (57,000 in one day), but it should also be remembered that the British never suffered anything like the losses of June 1916, when the Austro-Hungarian Army had 280,000 casualties in a week, or of August 1914, when the French Army lost 211,000 in 16 days, or of March and April 1918, when the Germans lost nearly 350,000 in six weeks (8,600 per day), or 1915 when Russia suffered 2 million casualties in a year.

Total British WWI deaths seemed especially severe as they fell among certain groups such as Pals Battalions (volunteers who enlisted together and were allowed to serve together—and were often killed together), or the alleged "Lost Generation" of public school and university-educated junior officers. In fact, British deaths, although heavy compared to other British wars, were only around half those of France or Germany as a proportion of population.

==== Alleged falsification of records ====
Denis Winter, in his book Haig's Command, accused Haig of being self-obsessed, surrounding himself with sycophants and the petty-minded, devious, and disloyal. Winter's work initially attracted favourable reviews and sold well but has since been described as "deeply flawed."

Winter also accused Haig of protecting his reputation by falsifying his diary to mislead historians as to his thoughts and intentions. Sheffield & Bourne point out that all three versions of Haig's diary (the handwritten original, the carbon copy thereof to which he sometimes made amendments, and the version typed up by Lady Haig) have been available in the National Library of Scotland since March 1961. Barring a few disputes over contentious meetings such as the War Council of early August 1914 and the Doullens Conference of March 1918, "the overall authenticity of Haig's diary is, however, not in doubt" not least because of the frequency with which its contents have been used to criticise him, and because the facts do not appear to have been distorted to fit a retrospective interpretation of the war such as that contained in the "Final Despatch" of 21 March 1919, in which Haig claimed to have delivered final victory after several years of "wearing-out" (attrition).

Robin Prior, an Australian academic critic of Haig, called the book an "immoderate... ill-documented, conspiracy-ridden tirade against Haig... (which demonstrated that) Great War studies have yet to leave their protracted adolescence," whilst citing Haig's criticism of MacDonogh (Director of Military Intelligence at the War Office) for getting information from "tainted (i.e. Roman Catholic) sources" (15/10/17) – as strong evidence that it was "not remotely the case" that the published version of the diary was sanitised. Dr. John Bourne writes that (given the low regard in which Haig had come to be held by the general public) "Winter's perceived conspiracy would appear to be one of the least successful in history. The falsification of his diary seems equally inept, given the frequency with which its contents are held against the author's competence, integrity, and humanity, not least by Winter himself." Both Bourne and Bond point out that the critics of Haig tend to ignore the fact that the war was won in 1918—Winter denies that there was any military victory in 1918.

Winter also claimed that Haig and the British Government had conspired with the historian, Brigadier Edmonds, to show Haig in a better light in the Official History. These claims were rejected by a number of British and Australian historians, including Prior and Correlli Barnett. Barnett's comments were supported by John Hussey and Dr. Jeffrey Grey of the University of New South Wales, who wrote that "A check of the documents cited in the Heyes papers, collected for C. E. W. Bean in London in the 1920s, and in the correspondence between Bean and the British Official Historian, Sir James Edmonds, not only fails to substantiate Winter's claims but reinforces still further Barnett's criticisms of (Winter's) capacity as a researcher... includ(ing)... misidentification of documents, misquotation of documents, the running together of passages from different documents... and misdating of material...(including) misdat(ing) a letter by seventeen years... to support his conspiracy case against Edmonds." Donald Cameron Watt found Winter "curiously ignorant of the by-no-means secret grounds on which the Cabinet Office, or rather its secretary, Lord Hankey, initiated a series of official histories of the first world war and the terms which were binding on the authors commissioned to write them."

Winter's claim that Edmonds did not canvass the opinion of veterans is untrue—some volumes were sent to 1,000 or more officers for their comments, as well as being checked against unit diaries down to battalion level; in some cases, entire chapters were rewritten (or in the case of Third Ypres, the whole volume was rewritten several times in the 1940s as argument raged about the degree of culpability of Hubert Gough, who was still alive). Winter quotes out of context Edmonds' advice to his researchers to write a draft narrative first then invite interviewees to comment over lunch: Andrew Green, in his study of the Official History, explains that this was done deliberately in order that memories might be prodded by the draft narrative and that senior officers were more likely to be frank if approached informally. Edmonds' criticism of Haig tended to be, but was not always, implicit or buried in footnotes.

Winter expressed doubt that Haig had passed out of Sandhurst top of his year or been awarded the Anson Sword. Winter's claim was refuted by S. A. Anglim, who consulted the Sandhurst records.

=== Journalism and popular history ===
Since the Second World War, Haig has commonly been portrayed as an inept commander who exhibited callous disregard for the lives of his soldiers, repeatedly ordering tens of thousands of them to supposedly useless deaths during battles such as Passchendaele. On 6 November 1998, just before the anniversary of the end of World War One, the front page of the Daily Express claimed that "he led a million men to their deaths" and asserted that they had died needlessly and as a sole result of his orders, calling for the demolition of Haig's statue on Whitehall, to be melted to mint medals for families of those executed as deserters.

Sometimes the criticism is not so much of Haig personally as of the generation of British generals he is deemed to represent: a view aired by writers such as John Laffin (British Butchers and Bunglers of World War One) and John Mosier (Myth of the Great War).

Alan Clark's book The Donkeys (1961) led to the popularisation of the controversial phrase 'lions led by donkeys' which was used to describe British generalship. Clark attributed this remark to the German generals Max Hoffman and Erich Ludendorff, but later admitted that he lied about the phrase. The Donkeys stressed how Haig devoted more space in his diary to King George V being thrown by his horse than to the losses at Loos. (Michael Howard dismissed the book as "entertaining but worthless as history" Listener 3 August 1961) In the work of Alan Clark (The Donkeys) and Leon Wolff (In Flanders Fields—which portrayed the battle as little more than crude slaughter) "rules of historical reasoning are carelessly trampled."

Alan Sillitoe called Haig "Britain's number one war criminal" (Raw Material, London 1972, p118)

Norman Dixon (The Psychology of Military Incompetence) argued that the war was disastrously managed, that Haig must therefore have been incompetent, that incompetent commanders are often authoritarians, and suggested that Haig's domineering mother and effort to control his childhood asthma (caused by "basic unresolved conflict over natural dependency") had made him an "anal sadist." Dixon also remarked on Haig's cleanliness even as a schoolboy, the fact that he was "totally anti-intraceptive," that he had a similar obsession with time as Heinrich Himmler, and suggested that Third Ypres, which featured powerful artillery bombardments accompanying "the expulsion into the (great reeking swamp) of more and yet more 'faecal' bodies... obstinate straining until the last soldier had been expelled into the cesspool" was "acting out of an anal fantasy of impressive proportions." This has been described as "crass" and as "backward and twisted reasoning" which "tells us...more about the psychology and... incompetence of psychohistorians" than about Haig.

Some dub him "Butcher Haig" for the two million British casualties under his command, although a critical biographer finds "no (contemporary) evidence of widespread contempt for Haig; the claim that ordinary soldiers universally thought him a butcher does not accord with their continued willingness to fight." One author who interviewed over thirty elderly veterans in the early 1980s recorded that "several" of them "cursed him... as 'Butcher' Haig. Others said that he did his best." He also recorded that their views about the war covered a wide spectrum—none were pacifists, but few of them were gung-ho patriots. One historian writes that the "Chateau General myth" put about in polemical memoirs is "in the main untrue"—Haig did in fact visit units, although seldom when they were in the front line, training camps, and even hospitals. Charles Armitage—one of the liaison officers who visited the front lines on his behalf—later dismissed the claim that Haig was "a hard man who had no true feeling for the men who served him in the front line" as "a wicked slander; the exact opposite is the truth."

Norman Stone describes Haig as the greatest of Scottish generals since he killed the highest numbers of English soldiers at any front in history, perhaps a slightly facetious point as Scotland in fact suffered one of the highest proportionate losses of any Allied nation (Niall Ferguson, The Pity of War).

=== Drama and literature ===
Haig was played by Sir John Mills in Richard Attenborough's 1969 film, Oh! What a Lovely War, in which much of the dialogue is taken from Alan Clark's The Donkeys. He is portrayed as being indifferent to the fate of the troops under his command, his goal being to wear the Germans down even at the cost of enormous losses and to prevail since the Allies will have the last 10,000 men left. (Although it is often asserted that Haig aimed to win a war of attrition (e.g. Arthur Bryant: English Saga 1840-1940: 1942 p293), this is not an entirely accurate summary of his military thought. One historian writes that it "misrepresents not only what Haig... initially intended to achieve (i.e. decisive battlefield victory after the enemy had first been "worn out") but what after the event (he) claimed to have achieved (i.e. German casualties which exceeded Allied – in fact Allied casualties exceeded German, contrary to claims at the time and in the Official History). It may be... what (he) actually accomplished, but that is a different matter.")

In the 1989 BBC comedy series Blackadder Goes Forth, Haig, played by Geoffrey Palmer, makes a single appearance in the final episode. Referring to the limited gains made during the 1915–1917 offensives, Blackadder says: "Haig is about to make yet another gargantuan effort to move his drinks cabinet six inches close[r] to Berlin." Haig is also portrayed sweeping up model soldiers from a large map with a dustpan and brush, and tossing them casually over his shoulder.

In the 1985 Australian television mini-series Anzacs, Haig was played by actor Noel Trevarthen and the series included scenes featuring meetings between Haig and prominent Australian journalist Keith Murdoch. Haig is portrayed as a cold and aloof man who is sceptical about the fighting abilities of the Australian and New Zealand troops arriving on the Western Front in 1916. The series also shows British Prime Minister Lloyd George having a strong dislike of Haig and wishing to see him removed from command in 1917.

Haig was one of the chief inspirations for the character of Herbert Curzon in C. S. Forester's novel The General, a sharp satire of the mentality of old-school British officers in the Great War.

== Bibliography ==
- Bond, Brian and Cave, Nigel (eds) Haig – A Reappraisal 70 Years On. Pen & Sword. (2009 edition). ISBN 978-0-85052-698-1
- Bond, Brian. The Unquiet Western Front. Cambridge University Press 2002 ISBN 0-521-80995-9
- Carlyon, Les The Great War (Sydney: Pan MacMillan, 2005)
- Churchill, Winston. The World Crisis (London: Odhams 1938)
- Corrigan, Gordon. Mud, Blood & Poppycock (London: Cassell, 2002) ISBN 0-304-36659-5
- Dixon, Dr. Norman F. On the Psychology of Military Incompetence Jonathan Cape Ltd 1976 / Pimlico 1994
- Duffy, C. (2007). Through German Eyes, The British and the Somme 1916. London: Phoenix. ISBN 978-0-7538-2202-9.
- French, David Raising Churchill's Army Oxford 2000
- Gollin Alfred Milner : Proconsul in Politics (Macmillan, London, 1964)
- Green, Andrew – Writing the Great War, (Frank Cass, London, 2003), ISBN 0-7146-8430-9
- Griffith, Paddy Battle Tactics of the Western Front, Yale University Press 1994 ISBN 0-300-06663-5
- Hart, Peter (2008). 1918: A Very British Victory, Phoenix Books, London. ISBN 978-0-7538-2689-8
- Heathorn, Stephen (2013). Haig and Kitchener in Twentieth-Century Britain: Remembrance, Representation and Appropriation. Routledge. ISBN 978-0-75466-965-4.
- Holmes, Richard. Tommy (London: HarperCollins, 2004) ISBN 0-00-713752-4
- Jeffery, Keith (2006). Field Marshal Sir Henry Wilson: A Political Soldier. Oxford University Press. ISBN 978-0-19-820358-2.
- Jones, Nigel. The War Walk (London: Cassell, 1983) ISBN 0-304-36683-8
- Keegan, John. The First World War. Pimlico. 1999. ISBN 0-7126-6645-1
- Liddell Hart. A History of the World War. Faber & Faber 1930, Cassell 1970, Papermac 1997. ISBN 0-333-58261-6
- Neillands, Robin (1998). "The Great War Generals on the Western Front". London: Robinson. ISBN 1-841190632
- Neillands, Robin The Death of Glory: the Western Front 1915 (John Murray, London, 2006) ISBN 978-0-7195-6245-7
- Philpott, William Bloody Victory: The sacrifice on the Somme and the making of the Twentieth Century (1st ed.) (London, Little, Brown, 2009). ISBN 978-1-4087-0108-9.
- Prior, Robin; Wilson, Trevor (1998). Passchendaele: The Untold Story. Cumberland: Yale University Press. ISBN 0300072279.
- Sheffield, Gary, Forgotten Victory. The First World War: Myths and Realities (Headline Review, 2002), p. 263
- Travers, Tim The Killing Ground: The British Army, The Western Front and The Emergence of Modern War 1900–1918 (Allen & Unwin 1987)
- Travers, Tim How the War Was Won (Routledge, London, 1992) ISBN 0-415-07628-5; (Pen and Sword, London, July 2005), ISBN 978-1-84415-207-0

== Biographies ==
- Arthur, Sir George Lord Haig (London: William Heinemann, 1928)
- De Groot, Gerard Douglas Haig 1861–1928 (Larkfield, Maidstone: Unwin Hyman, 1988)
- Harris, J. P. Douglas Haig and the First World War. Cambridge, Cambridge University Press, 2008. ISBN 978-0-521-89802-7
- Marshall-Cornwall, General Sir James Haig as Military Commander (London: Batsford, 1973)
- Mead, Gary, The Good Soldier. The Biography of Douglas Haig (London: Atlantic Books, 2008) ISBN 978-1-84354-281-0
- Reid, Walter. Architect of Victory: Douglas Haig (Birlinn Ltd, Edinburgh, 2006.) ISBN 1-84158-517-3
- Sheffield, Gary, "The Chief" (Aurum, London, 2011) ISBN 978-1-84513-691-8
- Sixsmith, E. K. G. Douglas Haig (London: Weidenfeld & Nicolson, 1976)
- Terraine, John. Douglas Haig: The Educated Soldier. (London: Hutchinson, 1963) ISBN 0-304-35319-1
- Warner, Philip Field Marshal Earl Haig (London: Bodley Head, 1991; Cassell, 2001)
- Winter, Denis Haig's Command (London: Viking, 1991)
- Wiest, Andrew Haig, Evolution of a Commander (2005) ISBN 1-57488-684-3

=== Primary sources ===
- Charteris, Brigadier-General John. Field Marshal Earl Haig. (London: Cassell, 1929)
- Charteris, Brigadier-General John. Haig. (London: Duckworth, 1933)
- Haig, Countess The Man I Knew (Edinburgh & London: The Moray Press, 1936)
- Haig, F-M Sir Douglas Sir Douglas Haig's Despatches (December 1915-April 1919). Ed. by Lt.-Col. J. H. Boraston, OBE, Private Secretary to Earl Haig. Dent. 1919
- Secrett, Sergeant T Twenty-Five Years with Earl Haig (London: Jarrods, 1929)
- Sheffield, Gary & Bourne, Douglas Haig War Diaries and Letters 1914-18, (Phoenix, London, 2005) ISBN 0-7538-2075-7
