= Clairette =

Clairette may refer to:

== People ==
- Clairette Papin Armstrong (1886–1973), American psychologist
- Clairette Oddera or Clairette (1919–2008), French-Canadian actress and singer

== Places ==
- Clairette, Texas, an unincorporated community in Texas, United States

== Wines and grapes ==
- Clairette blanche, a white grape variety
- Clairette de Die AOC, a French sparkling wine appellation
- Clairette egreneuse, a synonym for the grape variety Graisse
- Clairette precoce, a synonym for the grape variety Verdesse
- Clairette Rose, a synonym for the grape variety Trebbiano
- Clairette rose, the pink mutation of Clairette B
- Clairette rousse, Clairette Eorée, Grosse Clairette, Clairette à Grains Ronds, synonyms for the grape variety Bourboulenc

== Other uses ==
- Ethinylestradiol/cyproterone acetate, a birth control pill

== See also ==
- Clairet, a rosé style of Bordeaux wine
- Claret, a British term for Bordeaux red wine
