= Role of Douglas Haig in 1918 =

Field Marshal Douglas Haig, 1st Earl Haig
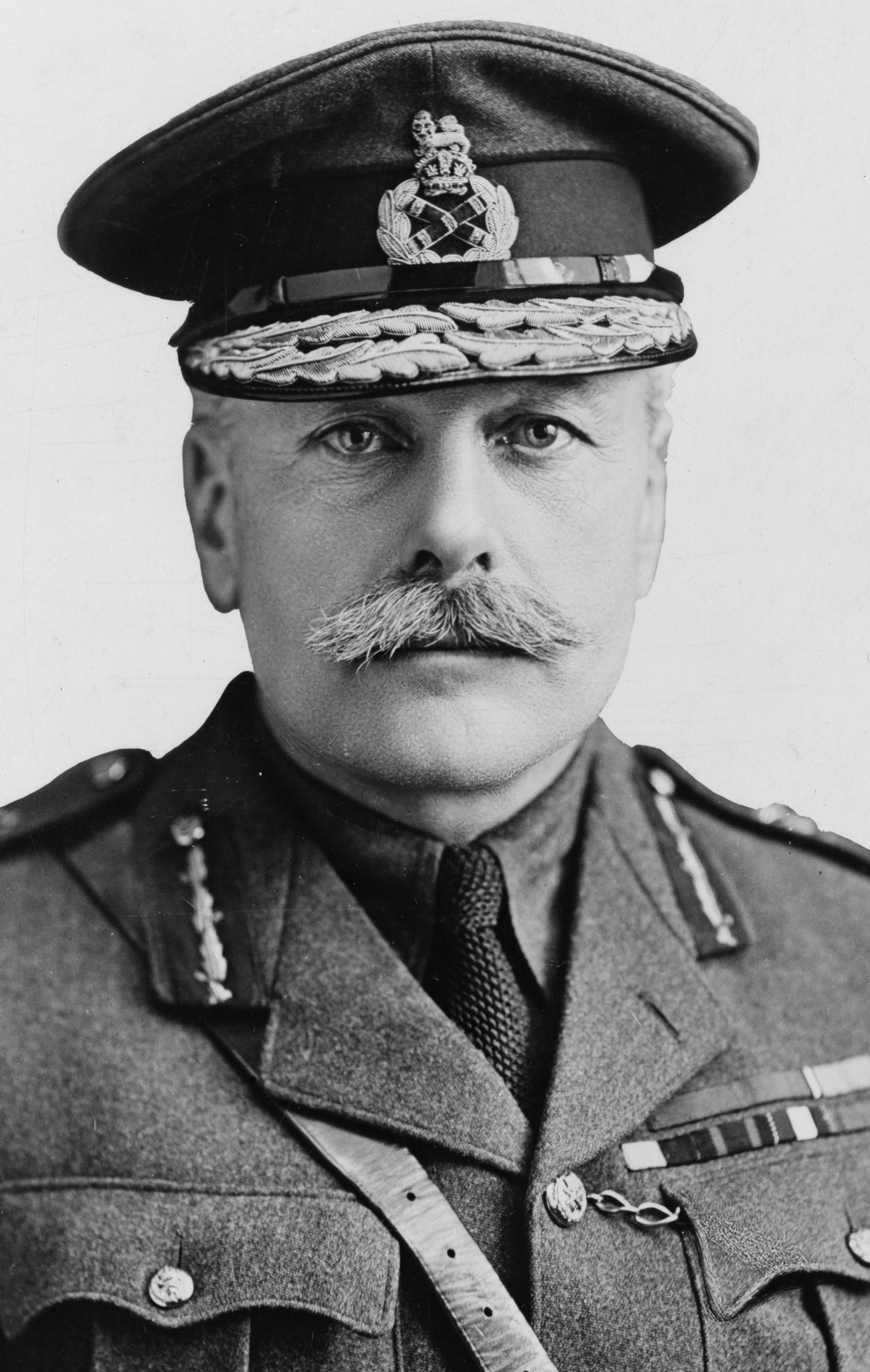
- Born: 19 June 1861; Charlotte Square, Edinburgh, Scotland
- Died: 29 January 1928 (aged 66) London, England

In 1918, during the final year of the First World War, Field Marshal Sir Douglas Haig was Commander-in-Chief (C-in-C) of the British Expeditionary Force (BEF) on the Western Front. Haig commanded the BEF in the defeat of the Imperial German Army's Spring Offensives, the Allied victory at Amiens in August, and the Hundred Days Offensive, which led to the war-ending armistice in November 1918.

== Political manoeuvres ==
=== War Cabinet discussions ===
On 1 January Secretary of State for War Edward Stanley, 17th Earl of Derby told Haig that he saved William Robertson from the sack by threatening resignation. He also hinted to Haig that the government wanted the removal of Launcelot Kiggell ("a tired man") as BEF Chief of Staff, and that General Richard Butler, Haig's preferred choice, was not acceptable. Haig had an interview with the King (2 January) to pick up his Field Marshal's baton. Haig appears to have been placing too much faith in recent German peace feelers, now known not have been seriously intended. He told the King that British soldiers (who, in a large conscript army, now included men from "all classes in the nation") needed to be told what they were fighting for. In Haig's view, Britain should keep to her original war aims, the defence of France and liberation of Belgium; he felt "democratising of Germany", about to be publicly reiterated by David Lloyd George as a British aspiration, was likely to destabilise Germany, as the fall of the Tsar in March 1917 had destabilised Russia, and was not "worth the loss of an Englishman".

Haig attended a meeting of the War cabinet (7 January). He claimed to have recommended that the British should keep the initiative and draw in German reserves (to prevent a German attack on the French) by renewing the offensive around Ypres, and that this proposal did not meet with political approval. In fact the logistical infrastructure was not available for a breakout from the Ypres Salient, and there is no mention of his suggestion in the official minutes. The minutes do agree with Haig's account that he warned only of limited German offensives. After the meeting Robertson, who had also been present and who had been concerned that Haig had not got his point across, insisted that Haig submit a paper warning of the danger of a major German offensive. Over lunch (9 January) at 10 Downing Street with Lord Derby and Lloyd George, Haig predicted that the war would end within a year because of the "internal state of Germany" (a broadly accurate prediction). John Charteris' final intelligence report had deduced that Germany was bringing 32 divisions, ten per month, from the moribund Eastern Front, so the most likely time for a German Offensive was in late March (again, a correct prediction). Haig again left the politicians with the impression that he thought the Germans would launch small attacks on the scale of Cambrai.

=== Manpower ===
As far back as 18 April 1917 Lloyd George had caused Maurice Hankey to draw up a memo recommending keeping "the War Office short (of men) to compel the soldiers to adopt tactics that will reduce the waste of manpower ... (and force the generals to make) careful substitution of elderly and partially fit men and coloured men ... behind the lines". A manpower committee under Lloyd George's chairmanship had given the Royal Navy, Royal Flying Corps shipbuilding, food production and timber felling all higher priority than the Army. The War Cabinet allocated (9 January) 100,000 Category A men to the Western Front rather than the 615,000 demanded by the Army. Lloyd George discounted the Army's warnings and wrongly thought the Western Front secure. Between January and March the BEF received 174,379 men, including 32,384 Dominion troops and 7,359 non-combatants. Many of the troops were Category B, i.e. not fully fit for combat, but the extra manpower enabled fitter men to be "combed out" from non-combatant jobs behind the lines.

The BEF's manpower shortage was not solely the fault of the politicians. 120,000 men of the BEF general reserve were kept in Britain to help the economy by spending their wages there. There were too many troops in the Middle East, but this was partly the fault of Robertson who had attempted to prevent action there by submitting inflated estimates of troop requirements. 88,000 BEF men were on leave when the German offensive began. Haig seems to have had little sympathy with the government's political constraints – he was unhappy at their lack of vigour in conscripting organised labour, whilst as late as 29 March, following the first German spring offensive, Haig would press for the extension of conscription to Ireland (not just for military reasons but "for the good of Ireland", and disagreeing with the King). Although there were about 1.5m soldiers under Home Forces Command in the UK at any one time, nearly a third of these were sick or wounded and another third engaged on legitimate work for various branches of the Army. Only around a third were potentially available for service on the Western Front, the majority of these being in training or under nineteen. Eighteen-year-olds had to be sent to France after the German Spring Offensives in 1918.

Haig remonstrated in vain with Derby (10 January) about the promotion of his ally Lt-Gen Hugh Trenchard from command of the RFC (replaced by Maj-Gen John Salmond) to become Chief of Air Staff. On 14 January Haig wrote to his wife, apropos the loss of Trenchard, that Derby was "like the feather pillow, bear(ing) the mark of the last person who sat on him" and remarking that he was known in London as the "genial Judas".

The War Office ordered (10 January) a reduction in the size of British divisions from 12 infantry battalions to 9 and a reduction in BEF cavalry strength from 5 divisions to 3. 134 infantry battalions were disbanded or amalgamated, and another 7 converted to pioneers. By mid January Haig had 58 infantry divisions, down from 62. Fighting strength was cut by 70,000 – a drop of about 7%. On 13 January Herbert Lawrence (then Head of BEF Intelligence) told Haig that the Germans would not have sufficient superiority "to ensure a decisive victory", although intelligence estimates of German strength were to be sharply increased over coming weeks.

Haig had used the need to send British troops to Italy after Caporetto as an excuse not to take over a section of French line, as had been agreed between the British and French governments in early October, but in January the Supreme War Council at Versailles recommended (SWC Joint Note 12 and Note 14) an extension of the British line to some point between the river Ailette and the Laon-Soissons road. Haig complained to his diary (14 January) that the British government were taking the advice of Henry Wilson and the "Versailles gentlemen (who have no responsibility)" but in practice he was being overruled. There is no evidence that he considered resignation.

=== Haig survives criticism ===
By now Haig's 1917 offensives were being criticised in the press. Lovat Fraser wrote a highly critical article ("Things Hidden") in Northcliffe's Daily Mail on 21 January. He wrote of the "ridiculous theory of "attrition" ", the "strategy of the Stone Age" and advocated attacks on other fronts. Northcliffe was now an ally of Lloyd George but appears not to have agreed the exact details of the press campaign with the Prime Minister. In Parliament J. C. Wedgwood openly demanded a change of command.

The purge of Haig's staff continued, with the appointment on 22 January of Herbert Lawrence as BEF Chief of Staff, in place of Lt-Gen Launcelot Kiggell. Lawrence was a much stronger character than Kiggell, and having made money in business and having no plans to stay in the Army after the War, was not beholden to Haig – actually in time the two men made a good team. Haig also lost the Deputy Chief of General Staff, Roland Maxwell (Quartermaster general), the engineer in chief and the director-general of medical services. Even John Terraine admits the changes strengthened the BEF.

The Cabinet Minister Jan Smuts and the Cabinet Secretary Maurice Hankey, whom Lloyd George had contemplated appointing to Kiggell's job, were sent on a five-day mission to France coinciding with the Lovat Fraser article. On the first evening they met Haig at GHQ and assured him that Lloyd George had no wish to replace him, although they had in fact been tasked by the Prime Minister on 18 January "to find out who are the rising men" amongst the British generals. Hankey wrote that "the atmosphere of complaisant optimism that formerly pervaded GHQ" was now "conspicuous by its absence", that general opinion was that the American Expeditionary Forces would not be ready for a major offensive before 1920, and that there was open talk, in which Haig participated, of a compromise peace, Haig being worried about the danger of France or Italy collapsing and believing that Britain had already gained more from the war than other powers and risked being left exhausted compared to the US. Hankey also recorded that officers had been angered by the Lovat Fraser article. Over the next few days Hankey and Smuts took discreet soundings among the Army Commanders to see whether any of them were willing to replace Haig – none of them were. The only possibility seemed to be Claud Jacob, General Officer Commanding (GOC) II Corps. Hankey formed the opinion that nobody important amongst the British generals thought a major German attack likely.

The Unionist War Committee (a committee of Conservative backbenchers) passed a resolution on 24 January in support of Haig and Robertson and demanding that the Prime Minister condemn Northcliffe's press campaign against Haig. Charles à Court Repington, now writing for The Morning Post and in a bizarre reversal of allegiances now effectively an ally of the generals – and using information clearly leaked by the War Office – attacked the government over manpower (24 January), complaining that the BEF was only to be given 100,000 Category "A" men. H. H. Asquith (Liberal Leader and Leader of the Opposition), then in France to visit his badly wounded son Arthur, visited Haig (26 January) and assured him that Northcliffe's campaign had backfired, although attacks against Robertson might continue.

=== General Reserve ===
At the Supreme War Council at the Trianon Palace Hotel, near Versailles (29 January – 2 February) Haig and Philippe Pétain (French Commander-in-Chief) complained of shortage of troops. The BEF was facing a 100,000 manpower shortage by June 1918, whilst Pétain talked of losing 25 divisions to natural wastage, but Haig's political credibility was so low that Hankey wrote that they "made asses of themselves". Haig argued against a common command, claiming that it would be "unconstitutional" for him to take orders from a foreign general. It was agreed that an Allied General Reserve be set up, under Ferdinand Foch with Henry Wilson as his deputy, but Haig argued that he did not have divisions to spare for this (worrying that they would be shipped off to fight the Turks but thinking the proposal would take time to become operational) and suggested to the French Prime Minister Georges Clemenceau (who was suspicious of Foch's ambition to become generalissimo, and whom Haig thought "the soundest and pluckiest of the lot ... a grand old man, full of go and determination") that he might resign. Lord Milner thought Haig's stance "desperately stupid", although in Sheffield's view Haig had a point that control of reserves by a committee was not necessarily sensible. Clemenceau attacked Lloyd George's wish to make offensives against Turkey top priority, and got Lloyd George to agree to delay offensives against the Turks for two months. Robertson openly opposed the Prime Minister; Haig did not speak in his defence, later writing that "LG never asked my opinion". On the last day the conference discussed the General Reserve and extension of line. Again, Haig did not openly oppose the government's plans, nor did he – at this stage – threaten to resign.

By 4 February the BEF front had increased from 95 miles to 123 miles, an increase of almost 30%. Besides constructing his defences, for which he had inadequate labour, Hubert Gough was formally ordered (Instructions to Fifth Army 9 February, following recommendations by Tavish Davidson on 4 February) to construct defence in depth, including an "emergency defensive zone" along the Somme and Tortille rivers (which run roughly north–south south of Péronne), and a fortified bridgehead around Péronne, from whence "strong counterattacks" were to be conducted when Petain sent the promised reinforcements. GHQ possibly still thought that the main German attack might be elsewhere. Gough had too many men too far forward in positions too far apart to be mutually supporting.

Whereas Fourth Army (as Second Army, under Henry Rawlinson's command, was currently numbered) had 14 divisions holding 23 miles, First Army 16 divisions holding 33 miles and Third Army 16 divisions holding 28 miles, Fifth Army had only 14 divisions holding 42 miles. Lloyd George later claimed that Haig left his Fifth Army flank weak out of pique, a claim given some credence by Elizabeth Greenhalgh.

=== Fall of Robertson ===
Lloyd George now prepared for a showdown with Robertson, who was still unhappy over the handing over of British divisions to General Reserve. He proposed that the CIGS be reduced to his pre-1915 powers (i.e. reporting to the Secretary of State for War, not direct to the Cabinet) and that the British military representative at the Supreme War Council in Versailles be Deputy CIGS and a member of the Army Council (i.e. empowered to issue orders to Haig). He offered Robertson a choice of remaining as CIGS with reduced powers or else accepting demotion to Deputy CIGS at Versailles – either way, Lloyd George would now have been able to cut him out of the decision-making loop.

Letters from Derby (early February) make clear that he expected Haig to back him and Robertson. Derby summoned Haig back to London on Saturday 9 February, meeting him at Victoria Station. As they drove to Downing Street ("by a circuitous route") together, Derby told him that the War Cabinet had already decided to sack Robertson. In a private meeting with Lloyd George, Haig agreed in principle with Robertson's position that the CIGS should himself be the delegate to Versailles, or else that the Versailles delegate be clearly subordinate to the CIGS to preserve unity of command, but he accepted that the War Cabinet must ultimately make the decision. Haig then told Lloyd George that he was "prepared to work with" the General Reserve scheme. Haig met Robertson on the morning of Monday 11 February, telling him to accept the post of Deputy CIGS in Versailles, and displaying no sympathy for Robertson's reluctance to hand over his job to Henry Wilson, whom Robertson disliked. He then had a meeting with the King, and asked him to urge Robertson to accept the Versailles job. Haig wrote in his diary that it was Robertson's "duty" to go to Versailles if the government so desired.

Haig then returned to France (13–15 February) to inspect Fifth Army, which was taking over a section of French line. On the morning of Saturday 16 February he met with the French Minister of Munitions, and attended a British Army Commanders' conference at which the apparent imminence of a major German attack in the Third or Fifth Army sectors (but probably not Flanders at this stage, as the ground was still wet there) was discussed. It was still thought that this might be the prelude to greater German attack in Champagne, a view apparently shared by French intelligence. Later that day he travelled back to England by destroyer and special train.

At home at Kingston Hill on Sunday 17 February he was visited (separately) by Robertson and Derby, then was driven by Derby to visit Lloyd George at Walton Heath. The Prime Minister told him that the War Cabinet thought Robertson's refusal to agree tantamount to resignation. According to Lloyd George, Haig "put up no fight for Robertson" and regarded Derby's threat of resignation with "an expression of contempt". That afternoon, at Lloyd George's request, Wilson visited Haig. He agreed to Haig's request that Herbert Plumer, who had just declined the job of CIGS, be restored to command of Second Army at Ypres (he had been away commanding British troops in Italy) and that Rawlinson (who had been in command at the Ypres Salient) replace Wilson as British Permanent Military Representative at Versailles. That evening Derby visited Haig, who urged him not to resign. On Monday 18 February Haig met Bonar Law, who was about to announce Robertson's "resignation" and who wanted to confirm whether or not it was true that Haig supported the General Reserve scheme, as Lloyd George claimed – Haig was in fact ready to "work with" it, but threatened to resign if forced to hand over divisions. Haig congratulated himself (19 February) at having defused a major crisis in civil-military relations by deferring to civilian authority.

Haig thought Robertson (who had begun his military career as a private) egotistical and not "a gentleman" and was unhappy at the way Robertson had allowed divisions to be diverted to other fronts, even though he had in fact fought to keep such diversions to a minimum. Although Haig had been suspicious of Henry Wilson, they gradually established a warily respectful relationship, and interactions were socially more smooth than they had been with Robertson, with whom Haig had never been on first-name terms. Haig noted (diary 25 February) that as CIGS Wilson was no longer keen on diverting efforts to other fronts, nor on Rawlinson building up a strong staff at Versailles. Haig's callousness towards Robertson and Derby, his equals, has been compared unfavourably to the care with which he tried to protect the interests of his subordinates Charteris and Kiggell.

== German Michael Offensive ==
=== Eve of the offensive ===
By March 1918 Germany's Western Front armies had been reinforced to a strength of almost 200 divisions by the release of troops from the Eastern Front. At this point Haig had 52 divisions in his front line Armies, and another 8 in GHQ reserve, and 3 cavalry divisions. Haig wrote to his wife (22 February) that he was "quite confident" and that it was "God's Battle" quoting 2 Chronicles XX Chap. General Butler moved from GHQ to take command of III Corps (the southernmost and most vulnerable corps of Fifth Army) on 25 Feb.

Allied intelligence did not fall for German deceptions that they might attack in Italy or the Balkans. At an Army Commanders Conference (Saturday 2 March), Cox reported that a German offensive was imminent, perhaps designed to "cut off the Cambrai salient" (Third Army sector) and draw in British reserves, although it was still expected to be prior to a bigger offensive in Flanders or Champagne. Haig privately thought the Guards Division "our only reliable reserve". He has been criticised for writing (2 March) that he "was only afraid that the Enemy would find our front so very strong that he will hesitate to commit his Army to the attack with the almost certainty of losing very heavily". The claim does not appear in the official minutes, which merely warn of a "prolonged" German offensive. In Sheffield's view he was in fact referring to the First, Third and Fourth (actually the former Second Army at Ypres, temporarily renumbered as it was under Rawlinson's command whilst Plumer was away commanding in Italy) Army fronts which he had spent a week inspecting, and which were well-defended – Smuts and Hankey had come to the same conclusion in January. Haig thought the Canadians "really fine disciplined soldiers now and so smart and clean" compared to the Australians.

On 6 March Haig had an apparently entirely amicable meeting with Pétain. On 7–9 March Haig inspected Fifth Army's front, starting in the south with III Corps. He noted widespread concerns, which he shared, at lack of reserves – he released 39th Division to Fifth Army and deployed 50th Division south from Flanders, under GHQ control, to the rear of Fifth Army. Julian Byng was sent a direct order (10 March) to hold the Flesquières salient as a "false front"

Haig was in England from 12 March. On 14 March, at a meeting at Downing Street, warning of serious manpower problems by June "if (sic) the Germans attacked". Bonar Law and Lloyd George, by Haig's account, tried to get him to say that the Germans would not attack. They accused Haig of having said that there would not be a major German offensive (which was not actually what he had said – he had said it would be "a gambler's throw") but agreed to shelve the General Reserve for the time being until enough American troops had arrived. On the same day Haig attended two long sessions of the Supreme War Council (at one of which, to his amusement, Clemenceau told Foch to shut up). On 15 Haig took part in a long discussion about the bombing of German cities, which he regarded as a waste of effort. That night Doris gave birth to his son Dawyck. He returned to France the next day.

Gough – whom Haig had been subject to a great deal of political pressure to sack – dined with Haig on evening of 15 March. There is no indication that he was crying out for reinforcements. Gough later wrote in his memoirs that Haig had explained to him that he was concentrating on holding the Channel Ports.

As late as 17 March Edgar William Cox, who had replaced Charteris as Intelligence Chief, predicted that the German offensive was not yet immediately imminent; Haig still believed that a power-struggle between generals and politicians in Germany (in fact the generals were very much in control) would determine if there was any attack. Haig's diary for 19 March shows him still sympathetic to the idea of a compromise peace. On the evening of 19 March Lawrence told Haig that the German offensive would most likely be on 20 or 21 March. By 20 March deployment of German trench mortars had been reported by deserters, and British artillery began some spoiling fire.

=== 21 March ===
Germany launched an attack, "Michael", on 21 March 1918. The German bombardment began at 4.45am; Haig was informed at 8am whilst he was dressing. 76 German divisions (German divisions were somewhat smaller than British), 6,608 guns and 534 heavy mortars hit 26 British divisions (the combined total of Fifth and Third Armies) and 2,686 guns. The Germans enjoyed superiority of 5:1 over the 12 divisions of Gough's Fifth Army, which were spread thinly over line recently taken over from the French; on the southern wing the Germans enjoyed an 8:1 numerical superiority, and their attack was helped by fog in the morning.

Haig was initially calm on 21 March, as – in the days before battlefield radios – GHQ was "an information vacuum" where detailed reports often took over a day to reach him, and spent much of the day entertaining foreign dignitaries including Newton D. Baker, the United States Secretary of War. Haig did not speak to Gough that day; Gough spoke on the telephone to Davidson in the morning and to Herbert Lawrence in the evening; according to Gough's later account Lawrence "did not seem to grasp the seriousness of the situation" and downplayed the chances of a renewed German onslaught the next day. GHQ may well still have still expected the main blow to fall on the French in Champagne. By the end of day the Germans had overrun the British Outpost Zone but had not penetrated the Battle Zone, a penetration of less than 3 miles, similar to that of Third Army at Arras on 9 April 1917, and on three-quarters of the 50-mile front attacked the Germans failed to reach their first day objectives. Lacking reserves Gough had to retreat behind the Crozat Canal. According to his diary, Haig appears to have been satisfied with the results of the first day (which was usually the most successful of any offensive), not realising that unlike the Germans in previous offensives he had insufficient reserves and depth of fortifications.

=== 22 and 23 March ===
Gough authorised a general retreat to the Somme at 10.45am on 22 March. There was soon a breakdown in communications between corps – Butler's III, Maxse's XVIII, Watts' XIX to its north, Congreve's VII further north, and V Corps (part of Third Army) to its north. Haig still anticipated further German attacks in Champagne or Arras, and his only actions on 22 March appear to have been to confirm Gough's decision to fall back to the non-existent Péronne bridgehead, and to telegraph Pétain, who had already sent 3 French divisions to the southern sector, for more help.

Byng had held the Flesquières Salient too strongly. The whole salient was not evacuated, freeing up a division, until 1.30am on 23 March. V Corps was close to collapse, with the Germans edging around their southern flank and threatening to split them off from Fifth Army to their south. A report by Cox on the morning of 23 March suggested that Michael was an all-out effort, i.e. not a prelude to an attack in Flanders or Champagne. On Saturday 23 March Haig met Byng and Gough for the first time since the offensive began.

Pétain and Haig met at Dury at 4pm on 23 March, Pétain stressing the need for Gough's Fifth Army to keep in touch with Maurice Pellé's French V Corps on its right. Petain agreed to place a group of two French armies under Émile Fayolle as a reserve in the Somme valley, south of Fifth Army, but could not agree to Haig's request to send 20 French divisions to Amiens because of the risk of a German attack in Champagne. Haig's diary at this point stresses the importance of maintaining contact with Pétain, even at the cost of abandoning the "northern flank". Amidst mutual suspicion – a French officer recorded Pétain's increasing fears on 22 and 23 March that the British would retreat on the Channel Ports – Pétain was issuing orders to cover Paris as a priority and maintain contact with the British "if possible".

At 7pm Haig met with Plumer, Henry Horne, Tavish Davidson and Lawrence, and ordered 3rd, 4th and 5th Australian Divisions south. Haig's GHQ Reserve was massed in the north, 72 hours' march away, to protect the Channel Ports. Formal orders were issued to Fifth Army to maintain contact with Third Army to their north and the French to their south. After initial optimism, Tim Travers has written of "panic" setting in amongst senior officers like Herbert Lawrence and Tavish Davidson at GHQ on 23 March, and there is evidence that a retreat towards the Channel Ports may have been considered.

=== 24 March ===
By the afternoon of 24 March Haig knew that the Germans were across the River Tortille and were advancing on Amiens. Having at first regarded the situation as in hand, he was incredulous at this development. 24 March was, in Sheffield's view, "probably the most traumatic day (Haig) had endured since" the First Battle of Ypres in 1914. Half of BEF supplies came in to Le Havre, Rouen and Dieppe and passed by train through Amiens, making it a major choke point, although the Germans did not initially realise the importance of the city. Planning that winter had left open the question of whether the BEF would retreat southwest or form "an island" around the Channel Ports (Calais, Boulogne, Dunkirk) through which Haig's armies drew the other half of their supplies. A retreat on the ports does not seem to have been decided until some days after 21 March. Haig remained composed in front of more junior officers.

Haig dined with Byng on the evening of 24 March and ordered him to maintain contact at all costs with Horne's First Army to his north. He told Byng that he was thinning his lines in the north ready to strike "when the enemy has penetrated to Amiens". Harris argues that this seems to assume that Amiens would be lost and would need to be recovered to restore contact between Third and Fifth Armies. Travers suggests that Haig had written off both Fifth Army and the link with the French at this point, that his telephone call to Henry Wilson that evening was to ask him over to France to discuss a retreat on the Channel Ports, and that he wanted the 20 French divisions at Amiens not to maintain the link with the French but to cover the British retreat or perhaps to counterattack. Sheffield argues that orders to Third Army were not a precursor to retreat but "a means to an end", pointing to orders for, if needs be, a counterattack onto the northern flank of the German attackers, and also argues that although GHQ had a duty to consider contingency plans, evacuation was, unlike in 1940, never actually likely.

=== 24/25 March ===
The next day or two are one of the occasions where doubt has been cast on the authenticity of Haig's diary. Haig's handwritten diary of the next meeting with Pétain (Dury, 11pm on 24 March) is brief. Haig agreed to put Gough's Fifth Army under the command of Fayolle (part of VII Corps, the northernmost corps of Fifth Army, was transferred to Third Army on 25 March). Haig's manuscript diary has him asking Pétain "to cooperate on my right" by concentrating a large force at Abbeville (30 miles north-north-west of Amiens, i.e. suggesting that Haig did not expect to hold Amiens). An undated British typescript record, drawn up later, refers to Amiens instead. Pétain was still expecting another German attack in Champagne, but was still promising to help – however, he had told his subordinates earlier that day that he would prioritise covering Paris (Haig's manuscript and typed diary differ on the degree to which he informed Haig of this at the Dury meeting).

Haig's typed diary – probably based on notes prepared in April – describes Pétain as "almost unbalanced and most anxious", claiming that after attending a French Cabinet meeting in Paris, where he had been ordered to "cover Paris at all costs", he threatened to retreat on Paris, leaving the British right flank uncovered. Tim Travers argues that Pétain said at the meeting that he would only retreat on Paris if Haig retreated on the Channel Ports, and that Major-General Sidney Clive reported from the meeting that Pétain had come away satisfied that Haig would not break contact. In a postwar exchange of letters with Haig Pétain denied that he had ordered a retreat on Paris or had threatened Haig that he might, a recollection which Herbert Lawrence appears to have supported. Pétain appears not to have discovered until 25 March that Michael was an all-out effort, but nonetheless was, according to other eyewitness accounts, in a state of despair by Tuesday 26 March. Sheffield's view is that Haig and Lawrence, on the long drive back to GHQ from their meeting with Pétain may simply have misunderstood his intentions, and that any factual errors in Haig's diary for this period were honest if mistaken recollections.

In the typed diary, Haig also claimed that on returning to GHQ at 3am on 25 March he telegraphed to Wilson (CIGS) and Alfred Milner (listed as Secretary of State for War – an error on Haig's part, as Milner did not hold this position until April, and thus evidence that the account was written up later) to come over to France and ensure the appointment of "Foch or some other determined general who would fight" as Allied Generalissimo. There is no record of any such telegram. Wilson's diary records that Haig telephoned him at 7 or 8pm on 24 March, before the meeting with Pétain, and after Haig's evening visit to Third Army. Milner, whom as a Cabinet Minister Haig had no authority to "summon", was already in France (on Lloyd George's orders after a War Cabinet meeting on 23 March), having visited Tavish Davidson at GHQ whilst Haig and Lawrence were with Pétain, then reaching Versailles at 2.30am on Monday 25 March.

Wilson's diary for their meeting on Monday 25 March (11am) describes Haig as "cowed" and saying that unless the French sent more help the BEF was beaten and "it would be better to make peace on any terms we could". Wilson claimed that Haig suggested Pétain be appointed Allied generalissimo (which is not consistent with Haig's later claim that Pétain was unwilling to help the British) and that he proposed Foch over Haig's objections. Haig met Maxime Weygand (then French Military Representative on the Supreme War Council) at Abbeville on 25 March, but left him with the impression that he did not expect to hold Amiens. He told him it was a "matter of time" until the British and French armies were driven apart. He gave Weygand a letter for Clemenceau, asking for 20 French divisions (at Amiens according to his diary) to cover the southern British flank. The letter is ambiguous and talks of the BEF fighting its way back "covering the Channel Ports", not specifically a retreat "to" the ports.

=== Doullens, 26 March ===
There were three conferences at Doullens on 26 March. The first was between Haig and his Army Commanders (except Gough). There was then a second with them and Wilson and Milner, who was able to bring assurances of French help from Clemenceau and Foch. The main conference was attended by Poincaré, Clemenceau, Pétain and Foch, as well as Haig, Wilson and Milner. Haig accepted the appointment of Foch to coordinate reserves of all nationalities wherever he saw fit. In his typed diary Haig claimed much of the credit for Foch's appointment and to have insisted that he have wider powers over Pétain across the whole front, not just the Amiens sector, than Clemenceau had wanted to grant him. The typed diary, although fuller, does not specifically contradict the handwritten original, and Sheffield's view is that Haig either needed to reconcile himself psychologically to the need to accept a French superior or else was simply letting off steam and wanted to give himself the credit he felt he deserved. Milner, who represented the British government at Doullens, recorded that Clemenceau was unhappy with Pétain's recent efforts, but claimed that he himself had persuaded Haig to accept the appointment of Foch; Haig's official biographer Duff Cooper gave Haig the credit but commented that the idea had probably occurred to several participants simultaneously. In his diary for that day Haig accused Pétain of "funk". He was later to make the same accusation against the King on 29 March and Lloyd George on 3 April; Harris suggests that he was attributing to others an emotion of which he felt ashamed in himself. After the conference Haig went riding (his main form of relaxation) for the first time in days, and Wilson recorded that he seemed "10 years younger" that evening.

Gough was relieved of command of Fifth Army. Haig recommended Rudolph Lambart, 10th Earl of Cavan for the job. Instead it went to Rawlinson, who took command at 4.30pm on 28 March.

Although the leaders did not know it, and although Albert and Montdidier had fallen, the British defence on the ground had been solidifying since 25 March. The Germans were experiencing logistical problems after advancing over the ravaged 1916 Somme battlefield, subject to constant attack by the RFC, and with their supplies and equipment pulled by horses in poor shape. A German offensive near Arras ("Mars", 9 German divisions, 28 March), against the junction of First and Third Armies, was predicted exactly by British Intelligence and was repulsed. After this was beaten back, between 29 and 31 March the Germans pushed on Amiens again. A Canadian brigade took part in an action at Moreuil Wood (30 March).

== German Georgette offensive ==
=== Haig keeps his job ===
Haig met Clemenceau at Dury on 1 April. Clemenceau summoned Foch on the telephone, and after his arrival he ordered the French line extended northwards to the River Luce, south of the Somme. Haig agreed with Clemenceau's suggestion that Foch should be given more power over Pétain. The Germans were known to still have a large number of divisions in reserve (diary 2 April). Lloyd George, Clemenceau, Foch, Pétain, Haig and Pershing (the US Commander-in-Chief, who had not been at Doullens) met at Beauvais (3 April), where Foch was given "strategical direction of military operations" although his powers were still largely based on persuasion rather than command. Haig also urged that the French launch an offensive to take the pressure off the British, to which Foch and Pétain agreed in principle.

Although Gough had been removed from command of Fifth Army, Haig still planned to appoint him to a new Reserve Army, holding a line along the River Somme between Péronne and Abbeville (roughly east–west), in case the BEF had to form a defensive perimeter around the Channel Ports. Haig had privately defended him after the Doullens Conference and did so again to the Prime Minister on 3 April, when Lloyd George demanded that Gough be sacked altogether and "sent home". Haig described Lloyd George in his diary (3 April) as an "impostor" and a "cur", whilst the following day (4 April) Lloyd George, having returned to England overnight, wrote to his wife (in Welsh) that he had found "Haig more anxious" (than the French leaders) and that he thought both Haig and Herbert Lawrence "both of them very second rate men". Haig was sent a direct order to sack Gough by Lord Derby (4 April). After the war Haig commented that a scapegoat had been needed and that he had been "conceited enough" to think that he himself could not be spared.

German attacks on 4 April (Villers-Bretonneux, east of Amiens, 25 miles from the German starting point on 21 March) and 5 April on the Somme front were beaten back by British and Australian forces. Although this was the furthest part of the German advance, Haig was still (5 April) discussing contingency plans with General John Asser to cover Rouen and Le Havre in case Amiens fell. The Government demanded a full report (6 April) into Fifth Army's debacle, especially the loss of the Crozat Canal and the Somme bridges. Haig had already asked the politicians to accept his judgement or replace him, and wrote to Derby offering to resign (6 April).

With a German offensive against Vimy or on the Lys sector apparently imminent, Tavish Davidson visited Foch at Beauvais (6 April). He asked for a French offensive, or that they take over front as far north as the Somme, or send French reserves to behind the British front. Haig also wrote to Foch that day. Haig met Foch at Aumale on 7 April; Foch said he wanted an offensive by Rawlinson's Fourth Army (the former Fifth Army) in cooperation with Marie-Eugène Debeney's French First Army. Haig regarded this as a time-wasting tactic as Fourth Army was still in no shape to attack. Foch was willing to deploy 4 French infantry and 3 cavalry divisions near Amiens but not further north. Haig asked Henry Wilson to come out and lobby Foch. Foch may have been influenced by a German attack (by General Max von Boehn's Seventh Army) against the French ("Archangel"), towards the Oise-Aisne Canal on the morning of 7 April, which took more prisoners than the Germans suffered casualties.

Haig's letter offering to resign was read by Derby to the War Cabinet (8 April). Afterwards a smaller meeting of Lloyd George, Bonar Law, Lord Curzon and Hankey was called to discuss, in Hankey's words, "the desirability of getting rid of Haig". Lloyd George wanted to accept his resignation, but Henry Wilson, who thought there was no "really outstanding personality" for the job, suggested waiting for Haig's report on the March retreat before making a decision. Although opinion was "unanimously agst Haig" the other ministers thought there was no obvious successor. Haig no longer enjoyed the support in Parliament of a few weeks earlier. Rumours were rife in GHQ that Haig would soon be dismissed in favour of Robertson, Wilson (who may have been a prime mover for Haig's dismissal), or more likely Plumer, Byng or Edmund Allenby.

=== "Backs to the Wall" ===
On 8 April Haig, having learned of intelligence reports of German reserves massing in the British sector, tried again, asking his French liaison officer, General de Laguiche, to ask Foch to send French divisions to free up six British divisions to form a reserve in Flanders, but Weygand arrived at GHQ to tell Herbert Lawrence in person that this was not going to happen. Wilson arrived in France on the morning of 9 April, just as the German offensive in Flanders was beginning.

British Intelligence did not predict the scale of Georgette, although in fairness the Germans were changing their plans frequently and only finalised their intentions a week or so beforehand. The Germans enjoyed significant artillery superiority (although less than they would have preferred after the intense fighting in the Somme sector) and some of the BEF line was held by poor-quality Portuguese divisions. Foch visited Haig at 1pm on 9 April, and again refused Haig's demand that the French take over more BEF line so as to free up a British reserve. Haig felt that Foch's proposal to deploy 4 French divisions west of Amiens would simply increase Rawlinson's logistical troubles without doing much to help. On 10 April Georgette was extended northwards, as Friedrich Sixt von Armin's Fourth Army also attacked, forcing the evacuation of Armentières by John Du Cane's XV Corps. Haig yet again demanded that the French take over "some portion" of the British line and give French assistance "in order ... to continue the battle".

Just as "Michael" had swept over the Cambrai and the Somme battlefields, won at such cost by Haig's own offensives in previous years, this offensive swept over Passchendaele although not Ypres itself. Foch and Weygand visited Haig at 10pm on 10 April and agreed to take over the British line as far as the River Somme and to send a single division, the 133rd (not quite the "large force of French troops" claimed by Haig in his diary), to Dunkirk by rail. By 11 April 37 German divisions were engaging 13 British, roughly a 2:1 advantage as German divisions were somewhat smaller than British. The only fresh British reserves were 1st Australian and 4th Canadian Divisions. Haig visited Plumer then demanded four French infantry divisions (Foch was offering a cavalry corps) be deployed between Saint-Omer and Dunkirk in case the Germans broke through to Hazebrouck, "the Amiens of the north", a key railhead through which supplies were brought from the Channel Ports – had it fallen the Channel Ports might have been at risk and Plumer's Second Army might have been cut off.

Haig issued his famous order (11 April) that his men must carry on fighting "With Our Backs to the Wall and believing in the Justice of our Cause" to protect "The safety of our homes and the Freedom of mankind" – the latter being a real concern after recent British propaganda dwelled on the harsh terms imposed on Russia at Brest-Litovsk. He also added that "the French Army is moving and in great force to our support" – in Greenhalgh's view this may have been intended as blackmail. On 12 April Haig met with Clemenceau and told him that the BEF required massive French help to "keep the war going". 12 April Lt-Gen Du Cane was appointed senior liaison officer between Haig and Foch, an idea broached by Wilson to Foch on 9 April. French observers were impressed by the resilience of British lower ranks, and by Plumer, but less so by other British generals.

=== Crisis continues ===
Foch had earlier refused to send 4 French divisions to Flanders but now redeployed Paul Maistre's Tenth French Army to the Somme sector, freeing up British forces. Foch was given the title of Generalissimo (he would have preferred "Commander-in-Chief") (14 April) to give him more clout over Pétain, who was still reluctant to release French reserves. Eventually, later in the year, Pétain would simply be placed under Foch's command, although Haig and Pershing retained their right of appeal to their own governments. During a renewed attack (17 April) Foch drew attention to the valour of the British at First Ypres and refused to send further French reinforcements so as to keep a strategic reserve.

On 18 April Foch offered to deploy 15 French divisions to the British sector, in return for Haig deploying tired British divisions to the French sector. Now that the immediate crisis in Flanders appeared to have passed, Haig saw this as an attempt to merge the British and French Armies. He discussed the matter with Lord Milner on 19 April (on his way back from a meeting with Clemenceau in Paris, and taking office as Secretary for State for War – in place of Haig's ally Lord Derby – that day). Haig seems to have admired Milner, but this was not reciprocated, as Milner had lost confidence in Haig during the Third Ypres Offensive the previous year. They agreed that mingling of British and French forces was "for a time necessary" but could not be allowed to become permanent.

24 April saw a further unsuccessful German attack at Villers-Bretonneux near Amiens, featuring the first tank-to-tank combat. On 25 April the Germans took the Kemmelberg in Flanders from the French. The next day Haig visited Second Army Advanced HQ and discussed abandoning the Ypres Salient. It was Foch who insisted on holding on. The British retreated but held the city of Ypres.

=== Disputes with French and Americans ===
Another meeting was held on 27 April, attended by Clemenceau, Foch, Milner, Wilson and Haig. Wilson pressed Foch on whether the priority was to hold onto the Channel Ports or to keep the British and French armies united. Foch indicated that the latter was the priority. British IX Corps was moved to the French sector. By the end of April Haig claimed to notice a slackening of enemy fighting spirit and on 30 April Erich Ludendorff called a halt to the Flanders offensive, although he hoped to attack the British in Flanders again at some point in the future.

The French were also irritated that they had not been consulted about the British shipping US infantry and machine gunners to France. Although some American divisions were now serving with the British forces, at the Supreme War Council on 1 May Haig thought Pershing "very obstinate and stupid" for refusing to integrate US troops (1 May) with Allied units (an ironic complaint in view of his reluctance to integrate British troops with French). Haig still thought that the Americans lacked competent senior generals and staff officers, and that they would not be ready for two years.

On 2 May Haig thought the Germans "uncannily quiet". At Abbeville (2 May) it was agreed that in the event of renewed attack British forces would retreat south if necessary and abandon the Channel Ports rather than lose touch with the French. Contingency plans were made (11 May) although it is unclear that they would ever have been executed.

== Final German offensives ==
=== The Maurice Debate ===
The near-debacle of March 1918 was an object of political controversy. Repington wrote that it was "the worst defeat in the history of the Army". Bonar Law had claimed in a House of Commons debate (23 April) that Haig and Pétain had agreed the extension of the British line, which was not wholly true as in January 1918 the Supreme War Council had ordered a longer extension than Haig and Pétain had agreed between themselves in December 1917, only leaving them to sort out the details.

Lloyd George was accused (in the Maurice Debate of 9 May 1918) of having given false information about troop strengths to the House of Commons in his speech of 9 April, thereby implying him to have hoarded troops in the UK to make it harder for Haig to launch offensives. Lloyd George misled the House of Commons in claiming that Haig's forces were stronger (1.75 million men) at the start of 1918 than they had been a year earlier (1.5 million men) – in fact the increase was caused by an increase of 335,000 in the number of labourers (many of them Chinese, Indians and black South Africans), and Haig had fewer combat infantry (630,000, down from 900,000 a year earlier), holding a longer stretch of front (the rest of Haig's men would have been tank, air & artillery crews and above all logistical support personnel). Although Maurice – who certainly collaborated with Robertson – visited Haig (13-16 April) shortly before his press letter, there is no specific evidence that Haig collaborated with his actions. Haig wrote to his wife that he had opposed Maurice in taking his concerns into public, but he was privately disappointed at how Lloyd George was able to get off the hook with a "claptrap speech". Maurice believed he had saved Haig from dismissal.

=== Bluecher Offensive ===
By late spring the BEF had taken just over 300,000 casualties. 12 of Haig's divisions had been reduced to skeletons. Battalions had had to be brought in from the Middle East. Haig spent time touring his forces in May. Haig's wife reported rumours (11 May) that he was to be brought home as Commander-in-Chief, Home Forces (in succession to Viscount French, who had just been appointed Lord Lieutenant of Ireland; in the event Robertson was appointed to the vacancy); when Wilson denied the rumours to Haig's face, Haig recorded (20 May) that "no one has been chosen yet!" to replace him. Haig and Lawrence visited Rawlinson (17 May) and ordered him to prepare an offensive near Villers-Bretonneux, in conjunctions with Marie Eugène Debeney's French First Army. However, the plans were put on hold because of the next German offensive.

Intelligence of Germans massing on the Chemin des Dames was at first thought to be a bluff until a few days before the attack happened. A third major German offensive ("Blücher"), against the French in that sector, starting on 27 May, again achieved a 25-mile penetration and overwhelmed Alexander Hamilton-Gordon's IX British Corps which had been sent there to refit after being involved in "Michael" and "Georgette". Foch at first believed "Blücher" was a diversion to draw allied reserves away from Flanders, which was partly true, but Haig guessed correctly that the enemy would "devote all his energy to exploiting his success".

Foch met Haig in Paris on 31 May and asked him to release some US divisions trained by the British and still under British command, to take over trenches in Alsace so as to free up French divisions. Haig was worried that the Germans would attack his sector again (intelligence reported extra German hospital spaces being made available near La Bassée) – this was indeed the German plan but the offensive in question, "Hagen", was repeatedly postponed and never actually took place. He promised to consider the matter, although he did agree to create a reserve corps of 3 British divisions to serve anywhere on the Western Front. He recorded that Foch was "more anxious" than he had ever seen him, although Lord Derby, who was also present, recorded that Haig himself seemed "tired and anxious".

=== Greater powers for Foch ===
Amidst British concerns that France might collapse altogether, the sixth session of the Supreme War Council met on 1–3 June. The British delegates – Lloyd George, Milner, Wilson and Du Cane – met privately on 1 June, and Haig advised them that the French Army had been in such a poor state since the Nivelle offensive and the 1917 mutinies that to place US divisions under French command would be to throw them away. At the Franco-British session that afternoon Foch complained that the BEF was still shrinking in size and infuriated Lloyd George by implying that the British Government was withholding manpower. Haig did not side openly with him.

On 3 June Foch informed Haig that he and Pershing had agreed that the US divisions would move to the French sector. Foch moved French forces down from Flanders. Haig complied with Foch's request to deploy a corps of 3 divisions to the Somme sector, but sent a formal protest to the British Government (4 June) at any further movement of reserves out of the BEF sector. At a major Allied conference at Beauvais (7 June) Lord Milner agreed with Clemenceau that Foch should have the power to order all Allied troops as he saw fit, over the protests of Haig who argued that it would reduce his power to safeguard the interests of the British Army. It was agreed that Haig and Foch should meet more frequently, and in time they developed a good working relationship (although wags at GHQ said he had to fight "Boche, Foch and Loygeorges").

Cooperation improved when the Germans launched their "Gneisenau" Offensive on 9 June, to widen the "Blücher" salient westwards. Milner and Lloyd George told Haig that he should consider himself subordinate to Foch for the time being and that they were no longer interested in sacking him (this may have been untrue – as late as July, just before the Battle of Amiens Lloyd George may have been trying to replace Haig with Cavan). "Gneisenau" was quickly defeated by the French General Charles Mangin at the Battle of the Matz (11 June).

=== Peace Offensive ===
By 14 June the German offensive against the French had ground to a halt, which initially puzzled Haig (diary 21 June); as well as the same supply issues as in March it was in part because the underfed German troops were disproportionately hit by the influenza pandemic. The mood of the Allied leaders was improved by the deployment of US troops: by 22 June, there were 19 US divisions on the Western Front, 14 of them in the French sector. Some of them had seen combat and had performed better than expected. By the time Haig met Foch on 28 June both men appear to have been in an optimistic mood, not least because of the recent speech by German Foreign Minister Richard von Kühlmann, which appeared to have abandoned the possibility of an outright German victory.

On 4 July the 4th Australian Division attacked at Hamel. 10 Australian battalions and 4 US companies took 1,470 prisoners at a cost of 1,000 casualties. Haig had approved the attack on 25 June, but thereafter his only direct involvement was to dissuade Pershing from removing the American troops. A tactical pamphlet on the lessons was quickly published. Haig forbade Rawlinson to push any further, but again asked him to draw up a plan for an attack in the Amiens area.

Haig took a few days leave in England on 6 July, his first since the crisis had begun. With another German attack imminent, Foch asked Herbert Lawrence (12–13 July – Haig was still on leave in England) to send 8 Divisions – he sent only 2 (Alexander Godley's XXII Corps). Haig thought this was contradicting Foch's Directive Generale No 4 of 1 July that covering Paris and Abbeville was to take priority, and wrote to Foch that he was misreading a German feint attack as Crown Prince Rupprecht still had 25 divisions in reserve on the BEF front. Haig still believed that the assumptions of that document, that any attacks in Champagne or Flanders might be feints to draw in Allied reserves before a major attack from the Lens/Château-Thierry region (i.e. out of the "Michael" and "Blücher" salients), were still good. Wilson consulted the War Cabinet then, in the small hours of 15 July, telephoned Haig and told him to "exercise his judgement" about holding the British line. Haig felt that they would take credit for Foch's victory but might dismiss him if disaster befell the British forces.

The German "Friedensturm" ("Peace Offensive") began against the French at Rheims at 4.15am on 15 July. Haig eventually agreed that the French could use XXII Corps if necessary "for exploitation". Over lunch with Foch on 15 July he agreed to send another two British divisions to Champagne. The "Peace Offensive" turned out to be the last German throw of the dice. On 17 July Haig asked for XXII Corps back, but did not get it. On 18 July a major Allied offensive, the Second Battle of the Marne, began. Most of the troops involved were French and American, but XXII Corps (4 divisions in total) participated from 20 July. The Germans were decisively defeated and the ground lost to "Blücher" recaptured; "Hagen" was finally cancelled.

== Planning Amiens ==
Rawlinson drew up plans to use both the Canadian Corps as well as the Australian Corps for Fourth Army's forthcoming attack at Amiens, and found (16 July) that Haig had already had the same idea. The four Canadian divisions were transferred to the front in secrecy, moving into place with two hours to spare – the Germans thought they were still at Arras. Brudenell White, Chief of Staff Australian Corps, drew up many of the plans.

Foch placed Debeney's (First French Army) under Haig's command, against Rawlinson's wishes, and encouraged him to aim for a penetration to Roye, 25 miles South East of Amiens. Neither the Prime Minister (who wanted to wait for the Americans to be ready before beginning major offensives) nor the CIGS Henry Wilson were told about the offensive until zero hour, Haig telling Wilson that "nothing startling" had happened at his meeting with Foch on 25 July. On that same day Wilson had submitted a paper forecasting that stalemate would continue on the Western Front until mid-1919, and that other fronts offered better prospects. Haig wrote on the cover of his copy: "Words! Words! Words! Lots of words! And little else."

To Rawlinson's dismay Haig, at the request of Foch (who was pleased at the success of the Second Marne, but worried that the Allied advance might bog down), brought the date two days forward to 8 August, and extended the planned advance to Ham, a further 15 miles east of Roye. Prior & Wilson criticise Haig for this overambition, but Sheffield argues that there was little concrete change in the operational plans, as the more distant objectives were beyond artillery range anyway, and suggests that Haig was both paying lip service to Foch's wishes and prodding Rawlinson to more aggressive exploitation in the event of success – in the event Haig did not criticise the cavalry for not reaching Ham. Haig spent the night before the battle at his own Advanced HQ in a train at Wiry-au-Mont Station, and visited Rawlinson on the morning of the offensive.

== Battle of Amiens ==
Amiens began at 4.20am on 8 August with an attack with 11 divisions across a 19,000-yard front. The Germans were bombarded with 350,000 shells from 1,236 field guns and 677 heavy guns, 450 of them on counterbattery work, an effective doubling of Fourth Army's usual 1,000 guns, and far more accurate and effective than before, with 504 out of 530 German guns already identified. 800 RAF and 1,104 French aircraft, and 552 tanks, were employed. Cavalry were involved from the outset, alongside light Whippet tanks (the attempt to coordinate the two was not, in the event, a success) and a battalion of armoured cars. Fourth Army advanced 8 miles on the Australian and Canadian front (6,000 yards had been planned), the longest one-day advance since 1914. The Germans lost 15,000 casualties, 400 guns and 12,000 prisoners while French took 3,000 more – earning General Erich Ludendorff's description of the battle as "The Black Day of the German Army".

The Royal Air Force suffered heavy losses. 45 aircraft were lost and 52 damaged beyond repair. There has been speculation that Haig may have had a role in ordering the switching of RAF efforts from ground support to an attack on the Somme bridges, for which they were ill-equipped and which made them vulnerable to German aircraft. There is no evidence that this was so and John Salmond, the RAF Commander, never tried to blame Haig.

Foch, claiming that the Germans were showing signs of demoralisation, demanded (10 August) that Haig push on and capture the Somme crossings. Haig would have preferred to have First Army attack at Aubers and Third Army towards Bapaume, and after initially agreeing with Foch's demand, changed his mind after consulting Currie and Lambert (GOC 32nd Division). Edmonds later claimed that Rawlinson was "almost insubordinate" in asking Haig whether he or "Marechal Foch" was in command, but this may not be an exact recollection as there is no record of the two men meeting that day. Haig told Byng (11 August) to be ready to attack with Third Army towards Bapaume and permitted Rawlinson to order a pause. Foch visited Haig's command train that evening and concurred with the decision. Haig's initial orders to Rawlinson, to be ready to attack again after a short halt, have been criticised but Sheffield suggests that Haig had to defer to Foch this time, to clear the way for Byng's attack. Haig then cancelled Fourth Army's attack on Arthur Currie's advice (based on aerial reconnaissance) that it would be "a desperate enterprise" for the BEF to overreach itself and engage new German troops with tired Allied ones who had outrun much of their artillery cover, and he switched to a new line of offensive. Haig wrote that on 15 August he "spoke to Foch quite straightly, and let him understand that I was responsible for the handling of the British forces". Foch had little choice but to agree, and interfered little with Haig's decisions thereafter, but removed First French Army from Haig's command.

== Battles after Amiens ==
Allied logistics had now improved to the point where a steady rhythm of limited attacks could be kept up, as opposed to single large attacks which ran out of steam like the Spring German offensives. Byng's Third Army launched the Battle of Albert between the Scarpe and the Ancre on 21 August. Byng had fewer tanks (156) than Rawlinson had had at Amiens, and apart from the elite New Zealand and Guards divisions, many of his troops were teenaged British conscripts. Haig – as with his previous offensives in 1916 and 1917, but now also urged on by Foch – encouraged his subordinates to aim for ambitious objectives, in this case urging Byng to revise his plans to thrust from Albert to Bapaume as quickly as possible, although Byng appears to have largely ignored him and made little use of cavalry. The attack reached Amiens-Arras railway.

On 21 August Haig was with Winston Churchill, Minister of Munitions to prevent the conscription of skilled munitions workers into the army, and who told him that new equipment (tanks, guns, new poison gases etc.) was being produced ready for what the government expected to be the war-winning offensive in July 1919. Haig told him the Allies were "wearing out" the enemy and should not allow him time to regroup and rebuild his strength. Sheffield points out that this was the same argument he had used in previous years, but this time he was right. Byng called a halt that evening, but Haig demanded further attacks, due for 23 August.

On 22 August, the day Fourth Army retook Albert, Haig ordered his Army commanders to pass down to all ranks the message that bold attacks were now needed, even to the point of divisions driving for distant objectives leaving their flanks uncovered: "risks which a month ago would have been criminal to incur, ought now to be incurred as a duty". It has been suggested that this was aimed in part as a rebuke to Byng. The following day he sent out further guidance, quoting the relevant passage of Field Service Regulations, on how "advance guards" should feel for weak spots in the enemy defences.

Sheffield (disagreeing with Harris & Barr pp146–7) argues that Haig was still aiming for relatively limited objectives, but with bigger bites across a wider front as he had wanted to do since 1915, and that he was aiming for "soft-spot infiltration", although still hoping for a complete enemy breakdown which would allow deep cavalry exploitation.

The Battle of Albert (21–3 August) saw Third Army push forward up to 4,000 yards over an 11-mile front, taking 5,000 prisoners, with Fourth Army attacking on the southern flank – in Gary Sheffield's description, a victory for ordinary British troops which would not have happened without Haig's prodding of Byng. The attacks continued for another two days, then on 26 August Currie's Canadian Corps, now part of First Army, attacked at Arras further north. Haig wrote to his wife that this, the Battle of the Scarpe, was "the greatest victory which a British Army has ever achieved", and although it did not achieve quite the planned level of success – cavalry, including a brigade of infantry in buses, had been ready to exploit – Ludendorff ordered further withdrawals that evening, including the ground gained by "Georgette" in April.

== Advance to the Hindenburg Line ==
After his recent successes Haig was Foch's most important subordinate, and in a letter of 27 August advised him to attack with several concentric major offensives into German-held territory, which would require the Americans to call a halt to their September offensive northeast from Saint-Mihiel towards Metz and instead attack north from the Argonne. Foch adopted this policy in his Directive of 3 September.

Haig still expected the decisive attack to be made by the Canadians attacking the Drocourt-Queant Line, but on 27–9 August Fourth Army advanced six miles towards Péronne, whilst further north the New Zealand Division (part of Third Army) took Bapaume, the objective of the Somme offensive of 1916.

Haig knew that because of manpower constraints the BEF would soon be cut from 61 divisions to 42 (10 of them from the Dominions) and that Pershing was withdrawing three of the five US divisions serving on the British sector. By this time Haig was keen to preserve the strength of the Canadian Corps, ordering them not to attack the Drocourt-Queant position unless sure of taking it, and the cavalry. In late August-early September the Germans had been driven back 15 miles and 40,000 prisoners taken, but at the cost of 80,000 casualties and Haig was aware that immediate decisive victory was unlikely.

When Haig's forces began to advance towards the Hindenburg Line Haig received a supposedly "personal" telegram from the CIGS Henry Wilson (31 August), warning him that he was not to take unnecessary losses in storming these fortifications. Haig, surmising that the War Cabinet were not forbidding him to attack but might dismiss him if the assault failed, telegraphed Wilson back the following day that they were a "wretched lot" (Wilson replied that the Government were worried about needing to retain troops in the UK because of the police strike) and wrote that attacking the Germans now would be less costly than allowing them time to regroup and consolidate. Byng, Horne and Rawlinson also wanted to attack rather than let the Germans consolidate. The advance up to the Hindenburg Line was difficult as many formerly British trenches in front of it had been converted to German use.

Acting largely on his own initiative, Monash captured Mont Saint Quentin (31 August) then Péronne (2 September), making untenable a position which Ludendorff had hoped to hold throughout the winter – Haig ordered III Corps to reinforce the Australians. That day Haig met with Roger Keyes to discuss a possible landing on the North Sea Coast (as in 1917, the mooted landing never took place), and told him that he doubted the Germans could hold the Hindenburg Line.

On 2 September the Canadian Corps and British XVII Corps took the Drocourt-Queant Line. That night the Germans retreated to the Hindenburg Line, along with further withdrawals in the Ypres and Lens areas – all the German gains from their Spring Offensives had now been retaken. Haig gave orders (3 September) to advance cautiously but to avoid "deliberate operations on a large scale" to conserve manpower for the forthcoming decisive battle. Haig thought the Germans' optimal strategy would be to abandon the Hindenburg Line and retreat to the Antwerp-Meuse Line, but although this was indeed Paul von Hindenburg's preference Ludendorff would not contemplate it.

Plumer's Second Army was (9 September) hived off from Haig's direct command into the Group d'Armees de Flandres (GAF), commanded notionally by King Albert I of Belgium but in reality by his chief of staff, the French General Jean Degoutte. Haig had to agree but declined to loan three cavalry divisions as well. Dissatisfied by Plumer's plan for a limited offensive to retake Messines, Haig urged him to retake the high ground around Ypres (the British objectives from the previous autumn) and be prepared to land a division on the coast at Ostend. Plumer was sceptical as late as 13 September.

On 10 September Haig, on a brief visit to London, told Lord Milner (Secretary of State for War) that 77,000 prisoners and nearly 800 guns had been taken in four weeks, and that German morale was disintegrating and it was "the beginning of the end". He thought that the aim should be to win the war that year and urged that all available able-bodied men and transportation in the UK be sent, as well as men earmarked for the Royal Navy and for munitions production, even at the cost of reducing future munitions output.

On 12 September, the day the Americans attacked at Saint-Mihiel, Third Army began moving up to the Hindenburg Line by attacking at Havrincourt, beginning a fortnight of grinding progress against Germans who were still fighting hard on that sector. On 18 September Fourth Army attacked at Épehy, reaching the Hindenburg Line. Haig received a congratulatory note from Wilson saying "you must be a famous general", to which he replied that he was not (as this would have meant currying favour with Repington and the Northcliffe Press) but "we have a number of very capable generals".

By this stage the British cavalry were weakened just as they were playing a much large role in the war. 2nd Cavalry Division had been broken up to provide a squadron of cavalry for each division, leaving Charles Kavanagh's Cavalry Corps with only two cavalry divisions, supported by a brigade of infantry in buses. (By contrast, of Allenby's 11 divisions in Palestine, 4 were cavalry.) Haig spent the whole of 17 September at a cavalry pursuit training exercise, followed by a conference, and then wrote up the report personally. He still hoped that cavalry could conduct a deeper exploitation towards Ghent or Valenciennes, but no longer had the resources to do so. With few functioning tanks and armoured cars left, the British were hampered by lack of cavalry.

Milner and Haig met again at GHQ in France (21 September) – Milner warned Haig that manpower would not be available for 1919 if squandered now and told Wilson (23 September) that Haig was being "ridiculously optimistic", might "embark on another Paschendal (sic)" and that he "had grave doubts whether he had got inside of DH's head"; Wilson thought the War Cabinet would have to "watch this tendency & stupidity of DH". He complained that Haig, Foch and Du Cane did not understand the shortage of manpower – in fact Haig understood it perfectly well but hoped to win the war before British manpower ran out. Lloyd George still hoped to shift British efforts to other fronts, leaving the Americans to take over more of the burden on the Western Front going forward.

== Storming the Hindenburg Line ==
The Allied "Grand Offensive", planned by Foch and Haig, now began, the most important attack being that on the Hindenburg Line. Haig spent 26 September touring senior British Headquarters, contrasting Rawlinson's optimism with Byng's caution, and – at Monash's request – giving a short pep talk and shaking hands with senior officers of the Australian Corps. On that day the Franco-American attack began in the Meuse-Argonne, then on 27 September British First and Third Armies attacked. First Army, which included the Canadian Corps, had to cross three trench systems and the Canal du Nord (dry but 100 feet wide), pinning many German reserves in five days of hard fighting and in due course penetrating 6 miles over a 12-mile front and taking 10,000 prisoners. On 28 September the Flanders Army Group (GAF) attacked in Flanders, eventually advancing six miles and almost reaching Roulers, which had been the immediate objective of the Third Ypres Offensive the previous autumn. On 29 September Fourth Army attacked, including the famous crossing of the St Quentin Canal (35 feet wide and 6 feet deep) by 46th Division, part of IX Corps, the men using lifebelts taken from Channel Ferries, after a mustard gas bombardment. Fourth Army was attacking forces of roughly equal strength, with the Australians (including the US 27th and 30th Divisions) covered by 1,488 guns and massed Vickers Guns. Rawlinson's artillery density was equal only to that of 1 July 1916 but infantry had more organic firepower now. There were conflicting reports as to whether the US II Corps had captured the crossing over Bellincourt Tunnel – when asked for guidance by Monash, Haig ordered that his own attack must proceed as planned, even if American troops were killed by friendly fire. A cavalry brigade commanded by Haig's cousin, Brigadier-General Neil Haig, was briefly committed to dismount and fight as infantry. By early October Fourth Army was through the Beaurevoir (German Reserve) Line and into open country. In late September Bulgaria sought an armistice, which also contributed to Ludendorff wanting an end to the war.

On 3 October Haig received a memo from Winston Churchill arguing for the conservation of resources for a decisive struggle in 1920. Haig thanked him politely, but wrote on his copy "What rubbish: Who will last until 1920. Only America?" There were still rumours that Haig might be dismissed and replaced by Allenby.

With the GAF and Argonne attacks frustrated by logistical problems (Pershing refused Haig's request to send any further American divisions to the British sector, where the bulk of German forces were deployed and where Haig felt he could make better use of them). At a meeting with Byng and Rawlinson on 1 October "they agreed that no further orders from (Haig) were necessary", as all attacks were proceeding satisfactorily. In early October Fifth Army, now under Birdwood, took Aubers Ridge and Loos.

On 2 October Hindenburg told the Kaiser's Crown Council that Germany could no longer win a military victory, and the following day a new government was formed under Prince Maximilian of Baden, which approached President Woodrow Wilson for peace based on the Fourteen Points. When Haig met Foch on 6 October, Foch showed him the newspaper reports of this and told him it was a direct result of the BEF breach of the Hindenburg Line at its strongest point, although the almost simultaneous capitulation of Bulgaria was also a factor and discussions would continue for a month until the ceasefire on 11 November. At the meeting Haig again asked for US divisions for his sector, and was told this was not going to happen.

== Final victory and armistice negotiations ==
After the breach of the Hindenburg Line, Haig's forces were through to open country. The Germans retreated to the River Selle (east of Cambrai) after a further British victory at the Second Battle of Cambrai, at which massed cavalry were used. On 10 October Haig received a paper from Foch recommending the seizure of the Rhineland – he disapproved, thinking this was too much like asking the Germans to surrender. The following day he received a telegram of congratulation from Lloyd George, which annoyed him by implying that the victories had been won by Marshal Foch.

By 12 October Third Army was held on the Selle river. On 14 October Plumer resumed his advance in the north, taking Roulers and reaching Courtrai. On the same day President Wilson rejected German peace overtures, causing the Germans to abandon the Belgian Coast and the city of Lille (17 October) which they had been hoping to hold as bargaining chips. On the same day Fourth Army crossed the River Sambre and plans were made to advance on the River Selle, amidst worrying signs of a stiffening of German resistance.

When asked his opinion about the armistice terms which should be offered to Germany, Haig presented pessimistic advice to the War Cabinet on 19 October. He urged moderation, warning that intelligence reports suggested that the German Army was still "far from beaten" and was concerned that the Germans were holding back the 1920 Class of conscripts to form a new reserve. He warned that the French and Americans "are not capable of making a serious offensive now. The British alone might bring the enemy to his knees. But why expend more British lives – and for what?", that prolonged fighting would increase the influence of the US, and that harsh terms might encourage Germany to turn either to Bolshevism or else back to military rule. He advised that the Allies should simply demand that Germany give up Belgium and Alsace-Lorraine. After one meeting on 21 October Haig suspected Henry Wilson, a staunch Unionist, of wanting to prolong the war as an excuse to subdue southern Ireland by bringing in conscription there.

Haig gave Foch the same advice at the Senlis Conference (25 October) – he was privately suspicious of French plans to occupy the Rhineland, writing to his wife (1 November) that the peace of the world for the next fifty years depended on not driving Germany to seek future revenge by humiliating her. He would later (e.g. in June 1919) defend the decision to save lives and money by offering Germany an armistice once she was clearly beaten, although with hindsight this allowed the myth to grow up that Germany had not really been defeated. The Allies agreed to offer peace on the basis of the Fourteen Points with a British opt-out for Point 2 (Freedom of the Seas).

First and Third Armies crossed the Selle on 20 October. Fourth Army advanced to the Sambre and Second Army to the Scheldt. President Wilson publicly refused to offer Germany a separate peace (23 October). Ludendorff resigned (26 October), whilst the Ottoman Empire sued for peace at the end of October. The German fleet mutinied (30 October). The Americans broke out of the Argonne on 1 November and two days later cut the Lille-Metz railway. 4 November saw an armistice with Austria-Hungary after the victory of the Italians – with British and French assistance – at Vittorio Veneto; Hungary and the Slav parts of Austria-Hungary had already declared independence in late October. The dissolution of Austria-Hungary encouraged the politicians to demand stricter armistice terms (although less strict than Foch or Pershing would have liked) and Germany was required to evacuate the Rhineland as well.

Between 26 October and 1 November was a period of quiet for resupply, then after 1 November followed three days of small gains. Haig had been irritated on Foch's insistence that Plumer's Second Army remain part of the GAF so that the French and Belgians could take credit for liberating Brussels, and after an ill-tempered exchange of letters with Foch, Haig regained control of Second Army (4 November). German fighting capacity was deteriorating, with much of their resistance coming from machine guns and artillery. The last offensive began on 4 November, including Sambre-Oise (where the poet Wilfred Owen was killed) where makeshift tank bridges were used, and the Forest of Mormal where the BEF had fought in August 1914. The crossing of the Sambre (4 November) saw further mass surrenders of German troops and made the German High Command realise that they must make peace before their army, which they wanted at home to use to prevent Germany turning to Bolshevism, disintegrated altogether.

Haig was now recovering his optimism. The Scheldt was crossed on 9 November, two days ahead of schedule, with the Germans now offering little resistance as they retreated to the Antwerp-Meuse Line. Byng and Rawlinson politely declined Haig's plans to exploit with Kavanagh's Cavalry Corps, citing logistical difficulties. The Canadians attacked the German Seventeenth Army at Mons, ending the war at the place where the BEF had begun it. When the armistice took effect (11am on 11 November) Haig was at Cambrai in conference with his Army Commanders and Kavanagh – after planning the British contribution to the occupation of the Rhineland they posed for a group photograph. In England it was rumoured that the Kaiser, before being diverted into exile in the Netherlands, had been intending to surrender personally to Haig.

== Analysis ==
J.P. Harris is highly critical of Haig's command record in the first half of 1918. Although British Intelligence guessed the location (but not the magnitude) of the March attack, insufficient troops were given to Fifth Army. Gough later complained of Haig's and Lawrence's apparent detachment for the first few days of the offensive ("a failure of leadership" in Harris's view), which may well have contributed to Gough's decision to order his corps commanders to retreat, a process which soon threatened to turn to rout. Haig's initial complacency soon turned to serious alarm, a breakdown in relations with Pétain, and without the intervention of Lloyd George, Wilson, Milner and Foch in the 24–26 March period, it is quite possible that the BEF might have been decisively defeated and the British and French Armies driven apart. Harris also suggests that Haig was close to panic on 9–12 April and 25–28 April, only holding on to the city of Ypres because of Foch's intervention. When the French in their turn came under attack at the end of May he was "slow to reciprocate the support he had received", albeit based on justified concern that there might be a German attack on the BEF front. He remarks that "despite the British government's generally poor view of his performance, and ... brainpower" he "somehow r(ode) out the crisis" and "rather amazingly" remained in command.

In the spring of 1918 Intelligence under Brigadier-General Edgar Cox, and Operations ("Oa", now under the future CIGS Brigadier-General John Dill) were now both put under Maj-Gen "Tavish" Davidson. This was probably part of the cutting-down to size of John Charteris' intelligence empire. A separate section—Staff Duties under Maj-Gen Guy Dawnay—covered organisation, training, anti-aircraft and (briefly) machine guns. In June Staff Duties gained control of censorship and publicity (formerly part of intelligence) and transport (formerly a separate department under Eric Geddes) was put back under the Quartermaster-General (now Sir Travers Clarke). No evidence has been found as to whether Haig supported or resisted these changes. Better BEF performance that year probably owed something to greater efficiency at GHQ, although greater delegation to corps and divisional commanders was probably also a factor.

There is some dispute over how much direct operational control Haig maintained in the Hundred Days, Tim Travers arguing that he exercised "a symbolic form of leadership", allowing his Army Commanders a very free hand, whilst at the same time Ferdinand Foch, whose role had initially been confined to advice and deployment of reserves, was exerting ever-greater influence over strategy. Robin Prior argues that by the second half of 1918 both Lloyd George and Haig were "moving steadily to the sidelines", although he also concedes that Haig intervened in operations much less now he knew the BEF to be a fine fighting instrument and "he proved far more effective as a commander" as a result. By contrast Sheffield argues that Haig was Foch's principal subordinate—they met sixty times between April and November—and influenced his strategy (in Wiest's view Foch was also "a buffer between Haig and his political tormentors in London".) "At last (Haig) was able to behave as the sort of "arms-length" Commander-in-Chief that was his ideal: setting broad objectives" but devolving detailed planning of battles. Besides, "he had presided over the transformation of the army" and "Haig's performance as a general improved as the army matured. He was ... doing fewer things better". GHQ also played a key role in sequencing the attacks of the armies in late September, and keeping them fully supplied.

The forces under Haig's command—including Monash's Australian Corps and Currie's Canadian Corps—achieved impressive results: whereas the French, American and Belgian armies combined captured 196,700 prisoners-of-war and 3,775 German guns between 18 July and the end of the war, Haig's forces, with a smaller army than the French, engaged the main mass of the German Army and captured 188,700 prisoners and 2,840 guns and around half of these prisoners were captured by British cavalry. British daily casualty rates (3,645 per day) were greater during this period than at the Somme (2,950) or Third Ypres (2,121) but not Arras (4,070 over a shorter period), because British forces were attacking across the line, instead of being rotated through a single offensive. The military historian, Gary Sheffield, called this, the so-called Hundred Days Offensive, 'by far the greatest military victory in British history'.

== Bibliography ==
- Bond, Brian and Cave, Nigel (eds) Haig – A Reappraisal 70 Years On. Pen & Sword. (2009 edition). ISBN 978-1-84415-887-4
- Carlyon, Les The Great War (Sydney: Pan MacMillan, 2005)
- Corrigan, Gordon. Mud, Blood & Poppycock (London: Cassell, 2002) ISBN 0-304-36659-5
- Dixon, Dr. Norman F. On the Psychology of Military Incompetence Jonathan Cape 1976 / Pimlico 1994
- Doughty, R. A. (2005). Pyrrhic Victory: French Strategy and Operations in the Great War. Cambridge, MA: The Belknap Press of Harvard University. ISBN 0-67401-880-X.
- Duffy, C. (2007). Through German Eyes, The British and the Somme 1916. London: Phoenix. ISBN 978-0-7538-2202-9.
- French, David The Strategy of the Lloyd George Coalition, 1916-1918 Oxford 1995 ISBN 0-1982-0559-7
- French, David Raising Churchill's Army Oxford 2000
- Gollin Alfred Milner : Proconsul in Politics (Macmillan, London, 1964)
- Grigg Lloyd George: War Leader (Allen Lane, London, 2002) ISBN 0-7139-9343-X
- Green, Andrew – Writing the Great War, (Frank Cass, London, 2003), ISBN 0-7146-8430-9
- Hart, Peter (2008). 1918: A Very British Victory, Phoenix Books, London. ISBN 978-0-7538-2689-8
- Holmes, Richard. Tommy (London: HarperCollins, 2004) ISBN 0-00-713752-4
- Keegan, John. The First World War. Pimlico. 1999. ISBN 0-7126-6645-1
- Neillands, Robin The Death of Glory: the Western Front 1915 (John Murray, London, 2006) ISBN 978-0-7195-6245-7
- Sheffield, Gary, Forgotten Victory. The First World War: Myths and Realities (Headline Review, 2002), p. 263
- Travers, Tim The Killing Ground: The British Army, The Western Front and The Emergence of Modern War 1900–1918 (Allen & Unwin 1987)
- Travers, Tim How the War Was Won (Routledge, London, 1992) ISBN 0-415-07628-5; (Pen and Sword, London, July 2005), ISBN 978-1-84415-207-0

== Biographies ==
- Arthur, Sir George Lord Haig (London: William Heinemann, 1928)
- De Groot, Gerard Douglas Haig 1861–1928 (Larkfield, Maidstone: Unwin Hyman, 1988)
- Harris, J.P. Douglas Haig and the First World War. Cambridge, Cambridge University Press, 2008. ISBN 978-0-521-89802-7
- Marshall-Cornwall, General Sir James Haig as Military Commander (London: Batsford, 1973)
- Mead, Gary, The Good Soldier. The Biography of Douglas Haig (London: Atlantic Books, 2008) ISBN 978-1-84354-281-0
- Reid, Walter. Architect of Victory: Douglas Haig (Birlinn Ltd, Edinburgh, 2006.) ISBN 1-84158-517-3
- Sheffield, Gary, "The Chief" (Aurum, London, 2011) ISBN 978-1-84513-691-8
- Sixsmith, E.K.G. Douglas Haig (London: Weidenfeld & Nicolson, 1976)
- Terraine, John. Douglas Haig: The Educated Soldier. (London: Hutchinson, 1963) ISBN 0-304-35319-1
- Warner, Philip Field Marshal Earl Haig (London: Bodley Head, 1991; Cassell, 2001)
- Winter, Denis Haig's Command (London: Viking, 1991)

=== Primary sources ===
- Charteris, Brigadier-General John. Field Marshal Earl Haig. (London: Cassell, 1929)
- Charteris, Brigadier-General John. Haig. (London: Duckworth, 1933)
- Haig, Countess The Man I Knew (Edinburgh & London: The Moray Press, 1936)
- Haig, F-M Sir Douglas Sir Douglas Haig's Despatches (December 1915-April 1919). Ed. by Lt.-Col. J.H. Boraston, OBE, Private Secretary to Earl Haig. Dent. 1919
- Robertson, Sir William Robert (1921). From Private to Field Marshal. London: Constable. ASIN B008TCWACC.
- Secrett, Sergeant T Twenty-Five Years with Earl Haig (London: Jarrods, 1929)
- Sheffield, Gary & Bourne, Douglas Haig War Diaries and Letters 1914-18, (Phoenix, London, 2005) ISBN 0-7538-2075-7
