= In Flanders Fields (disambiguation) =

"In Flanders Fields" is a poem by John McCrae.

In Flanders Fields may also refer to:

- Gent–Wevelgem, officially known as Gent–Wevelgem – In Flanders Fields, a bicycle race in Belgium
- In Flanders Fields Museum, a museum in Ypres, Belgium
- In Flanders Fields: The 1917 Campaign, a book by historian Leon Wolff
- "In Flanders Fields", a song from the Sabaton album The Great War
- In Flanders Fields, an Impressionist painting by American artist Robert Vonnoh; it is also known as Coquelicots; Where Soldiers Sleep and Poppies Grow; or fully, In Flanders Fields Where Soldiers Sleep and Poppies Grow

== See also ==
- Flanders Field (disambiguation)
