= Flanders Field =

Flanders Field can refer to:

- Flanders Fields, the name of World War I battlefields in the medieval County of Flanders, which spans southern Belgium and north-west France.
- Flanders Field American Cemetery and Memorial, a World War I cemetery on the southeast edge of the town of Waregem, Belgium. Poppy flowers began to grow after the burial of the fallen soldiers.

== See also ==
- In Flanders Fields (disambiguation)
