= Leon Wolff =

American historian

Leon Wolff (September 2, 1914 – October 11, 1991) was an American historian who wrote In Flanders Fields: The 1917 Campaign.

== Biography ==
Wolff was born and raised in Chicago in a Jewish family, the son of Abe Wolff, a traveling salesman, and Bessie Billow, a Russian emigrant. He graduated from Northwestern University, then served as a second lieutenant in the United States Army Air Forces during World War II.

After the war, he started a correspondence school, the Lincoln School of Practical Nursing, in Chicago. In 1953, he and his family moved to Los Angeles, where he transplanted the business and cultivated his interests in golf and jazz. Wolff wrote four books over the next dozen years.Low-Level Mission (1957) described World War II's Operation Tidal Wave against the Ploești oil fields in Romania, by the US Army Air Forces. In Flanders Field: The 1917 Campaign (1958), an account of the World War I offensive in 1917, otherwise known as the Third Battle of Ypres, or Passchendaele. Wolff also wrote the Francis ParkmanPrize-winning-winning book Little Brown Brother (1961), originally subtitled How the United States Purchased and Pacified the Philippine Islands at the Century's Turn, then wrote a final book, Lockout: The Story of the Homestead Strike of 1892 (1965), about the eponymous steel strike at Homestead, Pennsylvania.

He died in Los Angeles in 1991.
