= Clairette Papin Armstrong =

American psychologist (1886–1973

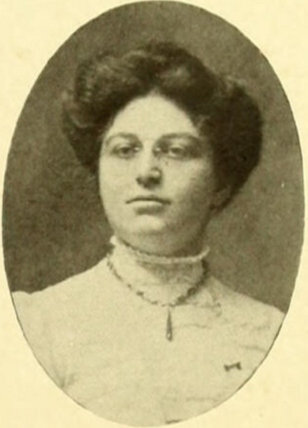
- Armstrong, from the 1908 yearbook of Barnard College
- Born: April 15, 1886; Memphis, Tennessee, U.S.
- Died: February 5, 1973 (aged 86); New York, New York, U.S.
- Relatives: Donald Armstrong (brother); David H. Armstrong (grandfather)

Clairette Papin Armstrong (April 15, 1886 – February 5, 1973) was an American psychologist and writer who studied juvenile delinquency and promoted eugenics through the 1930s and 1940s.

== Early life and education ==
Armstrong was born in Memphis, Tennessee, the daughter of Samuel Treat Armstrong and Alice Cobin Armstrong. Her father was an army surgeon and head of the Hillborn Farm Sanitarium in Katonah, New York. Her paternal grandfather David H. Armstrong was a United States senator from Missouri. Her younger brother Donald Armstrong was a brigadier general during World War II.

She played tennis in college and graduated from Barnard College in 1908. She earned a master's degree from Columbia University in 1909, and a Ph.D. in psychology from New York University in 1931.

== Career ==
Armstrong went to Europe as a Red Cross nurse during World War I. From 1924 to 1926, she was chief psychologist at Bellevue Hospital. She worked with the Children's Court from 1926 to 1933, and with the Domestic Relations Court from 1933 to 1946. In 1934 she spoke at the Eugenic Research Association meeting in favor of eugenic immigration policies, specifically to prevent juvenile delinquency.

== Publications ==
Armstrong's research was published in academic journals including The Journal of Educational Sociology, Journal of Applied Psychology, Journal of Abnormal and Social Psychology, American Psychologist, The Psychological Clinic, Journal of Genetic Psychology, Journal of Heredity, and The Journal of General Psychology. In her later years she had at least one paper published in a white supremacist journal, Mankind Quarterly.

- "A Study of the Intelligence of Rural and Urban Children" (1931)
- "Some Performance Test Norms for Children" (1932)
- "Sex differences in the mental functioning of school children" (1932)
- 660 runaway boys; Why boys desert their homes (1932)
- "The Gestalt of the Delinquent Child" (1933)
- "Delinquency and Primogeniture" (1933)
- "Some immigration methods and results in deviates" (1933)
- "Some mental and social inadequates" (1935)
- "A psychoneurotic reaction of delinquent boys and girls" (1937)
- "'Apperception Mass' or Psychology Right and Left? Suggested Planks for a Eugenics Platform" (1937)
- "Liberty and Mental Defect" (1940)
- "Some Comparisons of Negro and White Delinquent Boys" (1945, with Florence Heisler)
- "On defining psychology as a profession" (1947)
- "Psychosomatics of Everyday Life" (1949)
- "Some Notes on Imagery in Psychophysical Therapy" (1953)
- "Integrated Schools and Negro Character Development: Some Considerations of the Possible Effects" (1964, with A. James Gregor)
- "Psychodiagnosis, Prognosis, School Desegregation, and Delinquency" (1964)

== Death ==
Armstrong died in 1973, at her home in New York City, at the age of 86.
