= In Flanders Fields: The 1917 Campaign =

History of the Third Battle of Ypres (book)

- Author: Leon Wolff
- Publication date: 1958

In Flanders Fields: The 1917 Campaign is a history of the Third Battle of Ypres by Leon Wolff, published in 1958, with an introduction by Maj. Gen. J. F. C. Fuller, CB, CBE, DSO. In 1960, Readers Union Ltd published an edition produced by Longmans, Green & Co. for sale to its members only. In 1963, a re-edition of the book was included in the Time-Life Reading Program, with an additional introduction by B. H. Liddell-Hart. In 1979, a Penguin Books edition was published "with minor emendations". Based on this, in 2003 Cambridge University Press published a "Folio Society" edition.

== Synopsis ==
The first chapter, "The Deadlock", is a brief description of the causes and events of World War I leading up to the year 1917. It details the military plans of the year by the British, French, and German High Commands with considerable references to the diaries and official histories of the commanders and countries involved, the press, journalists, historians, and political figures. Also included are maps and photographic plates of the battlefields.

The Third Battle of Ypres is covered from the perspective of the high commands: the British Prime Minister of the day, Lloyd George, Sir Douglas Haig, Sir William Robertson, Robert Nivelle, Ferdinand Foch, and others. There are short quotes from newspapers of the day and soldiers at the front, with sketches of the actual battlefield, compared with the views at Headquarters. Wolff includes official minutes of meetings with Lloyd George and the War Cabinet, and diaries of high officers. Albeit tacitly, Haig is implied as making large assumptions without intelligence about the German defences, enemy resources of men and guns, or the conditions of the battlefield.

The book also details the battles of 1917, from Nivelle's offensive and the French Army mutinies, Messines Ridge, Poelcapelle, Menin Road, the village of Passchendaele (fought by the Canadian Corps), and Ypres. It ends appropriately with a sequel of the end of the careers, and life afterward of Sir William Robertson, Sir Douglas Haig, and David Lloyd George, quoting a line of Siegfried Sassoon's "On Passing the New Menin Gate", and finally concludes with a satirical passage on war from Sartor Resartus by Thomas Carlyle.

== Reception ==
U.S. Brigadier General Donald Armstrong praised the book, saying that "no writer before Mr. Wolff has merged truth and art so effectively. We know the beginning, the middle, and the end of the story; yet the reader feels a sense of urgency and suspense as he moves away from the Nivelle fiasco over Messines Ridge and along the Menin road pursuing the will-o'-the-wisp policy of victory by attrition."

== Bibliography ==
- Armstrong, Donald (January 1959). "Catastrophe in Flanders, 1917". Army. Vol. 9, no. 6. Association of the United States Army.
- In Flanders Fields: The 1917 Campaign. 2019. OCLC 1348698.
- Wolff, Leon (1958). In Flanders Fields: The 1917 Campaign. New York, Viking Press.
- Wolff, Leon (1960). In Flanders Fields: The 1917 Campaign (Readers Union ed.). London: Longmans, Green & Co. Produced for sale to its members only by Readers Union Ltd. Book sourced at the University of the West Indies (St. Augustine Campus), Main Library.
