= Donald Armstrong =

United States Army general

Donald Armstong
- Born: April 1889; Stapleton, New York, U.S.
- Died: January 11, 1984 (aged 94); Palm Beach, Florida, U.S.
- Burial place: Arlington National Cemetery
- Relatives: Clairette Papin Armstrong (sister); David H. Armstrong (grandfather)
- Military career
- Allegiance: United States
- Branch: United States Army
- Service years: 1910−1946
- Rank: Brigadier General
- Service number: 0-2967
- Unit: Coast Artillery Corps
- Commands: Tank Automotive Center, Ordnance Replacement Center, Army Industrial College
- Conflicts: World War I World War II
- Awards: Distinguished Service Medal; Legion of Merit
- Other work: President of United States Pipe and Foundry Company, Author

Donald Armstrong (April 1889 – January 11, 1984) was a brigadier general in the United States Army during World War II. During the war, he commanded the Tank Automotive Center, the Ordnance Replacement Training Center, and was commandant of the Army Industrial College.

== Early life ==
Armstrong was born in April 1889 in Stapleton, New York. Prior to military service, he attend Columbia University and received a bachelor's degree in arts in 1909 and a Masters in Art in 1910.

== Military career ==
On September 10, 1910, Armstrong was commissioned in the Coast Artillery Corps. During World War I, he was stationed in France. He participated during the Champagne and Meuse-Argonne offensives. In 1919, Armstrong was assistant military attaché to the United States Embassy in Paris. In 1927, he graduated from the Army Industrial College.

During World War II, Armstrong was promoted to brigadier general. From 1942 to 1944, he commanded the Tank Automotive Center and the Ordnance Replacement Training Center. From 1944 to 1946, Armstrong was commandant of the Army Industrial College. In October 1946, Armstrong retired from the Army. For his role in World War II, Armstrong was award with the Army Distinguished Service Medal and the Legion of Merit.

== Later career and life ==
After retiring from the military, Armstrong was president of the United States Pipe and Foundry Company from 1947 to 1951. In 1966, he published The Reluctant Warriors, a book on the Third Punic War.

He died on January 11, 1984, in Florida.

== Personal life ==
Armstrong was married and had one son. He also had two stepdaughters and three grandchildren.

== Honors and awards ==
=== Army Distinguished Service Medal ===
==== Citation ====
The President of the United States of America, authorized by Act of Congress July 9, 1918, takes pleasure in presenting the Army Distinguished Service Medal to Brigadier General Donald Armstrong (ASN: 0-2967), United States Army, for exceptionally meritorious and distinguished services to the Government of the United States, in a duty of great responsibility during the period from February 1945 to July 1946. The singularly distinctive accomplishments of General Armstrong reflect the highest credit upon himself and the United States Army.

=== Legion of Merit ===
==== Citation ====
The President of the United States of America takes pleasure in presenting the Legion of Merit (Navy Award) to Brigadier General Donald Armstrong (ASN: 0-2967), United States Army, for exceptionally meritorious conduct in the performance of outstanding services to the Government of the United States. As Commandant of the Army Industrial College from 1 September 1944 to 20 February 1945, during which time over 1,600 Navy officers and civilians were trained under his command in contract settlement work. The excellence of instruction offered resulted in the Navy using the School as its major instructional institution for all the Navy's contract termination personnel. His administration was marked by complete cooperation with the Navy Department and was noteworthy for the high standard of instruction provided by the School under his command. The meritorious performance of duty was a real contribution to the readjustment problems not only of the Navy but of the Nation.
