= Lovat Fraser =

British journalist

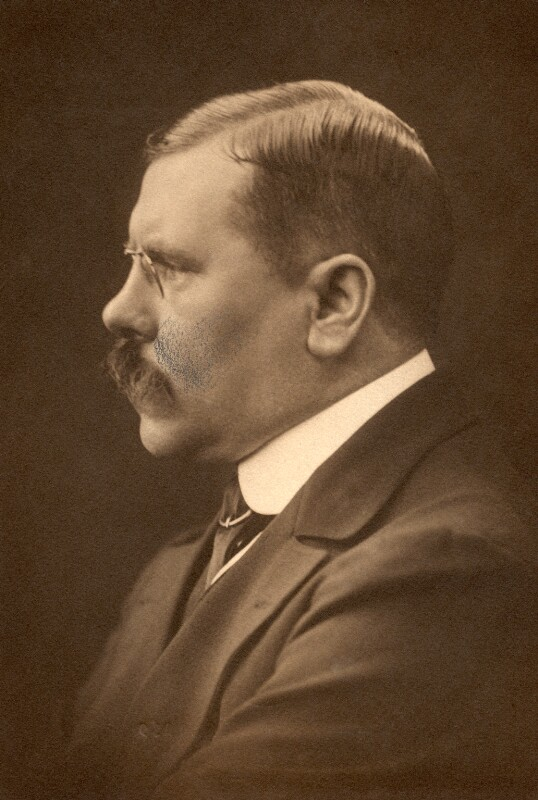
Lovat Fraser in 1911

Lovat George Fraser (18 November 1871 – 20 April 1926) was a British journalist who was the editor of The Times of India.

He also contributed to Country Life, The Gloucestershire Echo, The Somerset County Herald, and the Western Daily Press.

Fraser was born in the parish of St George Hanover Square, London, to Donald Fraser, a Scottish merchant, and Mary Gascoyne. He died in Slough.

== Works ==
- At Delhi (1903)
- India under Curzon & After (1911)
