= Amritsar 1919 =

2019 book by Kim A. Wagner

Amritsar 1919: An Empire of Fear and the Making of a Massacre
- First edition hardcover
- Author: Kim A. Wagner
- Audio read by: Neil Shah
- Subjects: History; South Asian history; Humanities
- Published: 2019
- Publisher: Yale University Press
- Publication place: UK
- Pages: 360
- ISBN: 978-0-300-20035-5
- Dewey Decimal: 954/.552
- LC Class: DS480.5 .W34 2019

Amritsar 1919: An Empire of Fear and the Making of a Massacre (2019), is a book by Kim A. Wagner and published by Yale University Press, that aims to dispel myths surrounding the Jallianwala Bagh massacre that took place in Amritsar, India, on 13 April 1919.

In the absence of any photographs of the event and with significant differences between British and Indian accounts of how many were killed and how and why it happened, Wagner examines primary sources to trace the events leading up to the massacre and then discusses its aftermath. According to Wagner, the background to the massacre starts with the Indian rebellion of 1857 and the subsequent British fear of a recurrence.

By 1919, Indians aspired to greater self-governance, a wish frustrated by the proposals of the Rowlatt Act. The result was Mahatma Gandhi's Satyagraha movement, in which he persuaded his fellows to pursue a strategy of nonviolent resistance. Fearing another rebellion, events in Amritsar unfolded into Indian political agitation, the arrest of two key Indian political leaders, and panic among British colonial officials. Then came General Reginald Dyer's action towards a large peaceful crowd and the killings at Jallianwalla Bagh. Colonial authorities responded with martial law and the arrest and torture of a number of Indians in Amritsar. Contrary to a number of widely held beliefs, Wagner's research reveals an alternative number of how many were killed in the massacre, how many were found in the well and an account of why Dyer acted as he did.

The book was released in 2019, the 100th anniversary of the massacre, and triggered responses in a number of publications including The Hindustan Times, The Telegraph and the London Review of Books. Amongst the reviewers have been Sathnam Sanghera, Andrew Lycett, Tunku Varadarajan and Ferdinand Mount.

== Publication ==
Amritsar 1919: An Empire of Fear and the Making of a Massacre was published in 2019 by Yale University Press. It is available in hard back, paper back and an audio version narrated by Neil Shah. The author is Kim A. Wagner, who lectures on colonial India and the British Empire at Queen Mary, University of London. He previously authored The Skull of Alum Bheg: The Life and Death of a Rebel of 1857 and Thuggee.

The book has 360 pages, 26 black and white illustrations, four maps and 12 chapters preceded by an introduction and a section on acknowledgements. Following the twelfth chapter is a conclusion and epilogue.

== Summary ==
Wagner explains that "the Amritsar Massacre isn’t understood very well", particularly in the absence of any photographs of 13 April 1919 and with a significant variation in British and Indian accounts of how many were killed and how and why it happened. In his book, he examines primary sources to trace the events leading up to the massacre and discusses its aftermath.

=== Beginning ===
The book begins with a scene from Richard Attenborough’s 1982 film Gandhi, what Wagner cites as the most popular depiction of the Jallianwalla Bagh Massacre and "how many people today think of what was arguably the bloodiest massacre in the history of the British Empire".

=== Events ===
According to Wagner, understanding the massacre requires beginning with the Indian rebellion of 1857. In 1919, the continuing fear of a revolution led to the proposal of the Rowlatt Act which would give British colonial authorities powers to quash any political agitation, and contradicted the simultaneous promises with the Indian National Congress to give greater involvement to Indians in government. Mahatma Gandhi responded by proposing that all Indians oppose the Act and make a Satyagraha pledge, a promise to resist without using violence. The subsequent call for general strikes in late March 1919 then led to the arrest of two local Indian leaders. On 10 April 1919, upon hearing of the arrests, a crowd of Indians issued a petition for the release of their leaders. When security forces panicked and opened fire in reaction to seeing the approaching crowd, riots erupted. On that day, Wagner noted that "European civilians had been killed by Indian rioters, and white women had been attacked by brown men" for the first time since 1857. Colonial authorities subsequently banned all future gatherings. However, the ban was not widely acknowledged and "many either unaware of the proclamation or not believing that the British would actually resort to violence, proceeded to announce a meeting at the Jallianwala Bagh that would take place on April 13, 1919".

=== Jallianwala Bagh ===
The crowd at Jallianwalla Bagh was composed of mainly men and many from out of town, making up to 20,000 people, who had mostly come to celebrate a religious festival. Speeches focussed on the Rowlatt Act, the call to release the two arrested local Indian leaders, and effects on Indians of the First World War. In Wagner's words "on the 13th of April, 1919, there was nobody in Jallianwala Bagh who thought about independence. They were not heroic freedom fighters. They still had an abiding belief in the ultimate justice of the Raj, and they still thought of the British government as being the arbiter of justice". When Dyer arrived "he was overwhelmed by the sheer size of the gathering that he had walked in on" and assumed it was a rebellion. Wagner claims that Dyer's actions were one of "racialized fear and violent suppression". Afterwards, the British authorities provided no assistance with removing the dead or medical assistance for the injured, instead imposing curfews, the Crawling Order and martial law and those suspected of being involved in the 10 April riots were arrested and tortured. Censorship ensured suppression of the details of the Amritsar troubles and the massacre until October 1919. In July 1920, the matter was discussed in the House of Commons. Some noted the "un-English" nature of what happened and took his actions as a "blemish on an otherwise untarnished British rule". Others saw Dyer's actions as necessary.

=== Dispelling myths ===
Using primary sources to gather evidence, Wagner has clarified that the book aims to dispel a number of myths surrounding the events of the massacre in Amritsar on 13 April 1919. Contrary to a number of widely held beliefs, Wagner's research reveals 500 to 600 is a more likely "plausible estimate" of the number killed at the Bagh on 13 April 1919, and that "eyewitness accounts recall only one or two bodies as having been recovered from the well inside the park". That number, however, he says, does not "actually change the enormity of what happened".

== Response ==
In 2019, coinciding with the 100th anniversary of the massacre at Jallianwalla Bagh, the book triggered responses in a number of publications including The Spectator by William Dalrymple, who noted that Wagner had used extensive primary sources in his research and "almost every sentence is footnoted — gets as close as we are ever likely to get to the truth of what happened in Jallianwalla Bagh. In the process, he demolishes a large number of myths that have grown up around the event, both imperial and nationalist".

Andrew Lycett, writing in The Telegraph, described the book as having skilfully mapped out the events. Reporting in The Times, Tunku Varadarajan agreed with Wagner that the book is "a microhistory of a global event", aimed at neither those with "Raj nostalgia or Indian Nationalism". These responses were also supported by John Newsinger. However, Newsinger, with regards to the fear of another 1857, pointed out "one disagreement with Wagner's discussion of this is that on occasions it [the book] seems to suggest that the massacre was the result of a misunderstanding, that if the British had not been so obsessed with the events of the 1850s then the massacre might never have taken place".

Trevor Grundy recommended the book be taught at schools and colleges. Ferdinand Mount in the London Review of Books, noted that General Dyer's evidence is quoted at length in the book. Both Grundy and Mount compared Amritsar 1919 with Nick Lloyd's The Amritsar Massacre: The Untold Story of One Fateful Day (2011) and with Nigel Collett's The Butcher of Amritsar (2005). Mount argued that Wagner had underplayed the personality of General Dyer, portraying him as "nothing exceptional ... and nothing extraordinary", instead emphasising that it was "brutality" in general that was the "driving principle of the Raj" rather than the personality of individuals. Wagner responded to Mount's view that "Dyer and the massacre were unique" and that the massacre "was all down to the personality of one officer", by citing other incidents mentioned by Mount "in which British officers in India from 1857 onward resorted to exemplary and indiscriminate massacres", such as those committed by Hector Munro, Frederick Henry Cooper and James George Smith Neill.

Amritsar 1919 has also been reviewed along with other books revolved around the massacre, including Anita Anand's The Patient Assassin. Reviews also appeared in The Hindustan Times, and other commentators have included Sathnam Sanghera.
