= Richard Haking =

British Army general (1862–1945)

General Sir Richard Haking GBE KCB KCMG
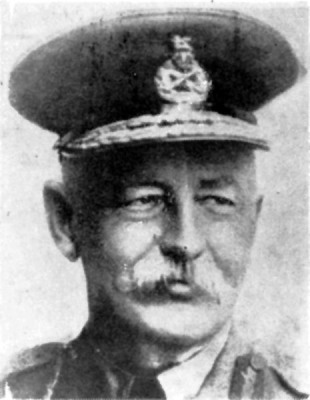
- Born: 24 January 1862; Halifax, West Riding of Yorkshire
- Died: 9 June 1945 (aged 83)
- Military career
- Allegiance: United Kingdom
- Branch: British Army
- Service years: 1881–1927
- Rank: General
- Units: 67th (South Hampshire) Regiment of Foot; Hampshire Regiment
- Commands: British Troops in Egypt; XI Corps; 1st Division; 5th Infantry Brigade
- Conflicts: Third Anglo-Burmese War; Second Boer War; First World War
- Awards: Knight Grand Cross of the Order of the British Empire; Knight Commander of the Order of the Bath; Knight Commander of the Order of St Michael and St George
- Other work: Armistice commissioner

General Sir Richard Cyril Byrne Haking (24 January 1862 – 9 June 1945) was a senior British Army officer who is most notable for being the commander of XI Corps for most of the First World War.

Arguments over the late release of XI Corps on the first day of the Battle of Loos in September 1915 were instrumental in forcing the resignation of Field Marshal Sir John French as Commander-in-Chief of the British Expeditionary Force. Haking is remembered chiefly for the negligible gains and high casualties suffered by his forces (including Australian troops) at the second Attack at Fromelles, during the Battle of the Somme 50 mi (80 km) to the south. Although blocked from further promotion, he continued in command of XI Corps – including in Italy in the winter of 1917–1918 and in Flanders in April 1918 – until the end of the war. After the war he held two politically sensitive posts: he was the League of Nations High Commissioner for the Free City of Danzig in the early 1920s, and then General Officer Commanding (GOC) British Troops in Egypt.

Haking has enjoyed a poor reputation, especially in Australian writing. In the 21st century, at least two British historians have sought to defend his reputation, including his recent biographer Michael Senior (2012) and Gordon Corrigan (2003) who regarded him as an "intelligent and capable man" unfairly maligned in the popular mythology of the war.

== Early life and military career ==
Haking was born on 24 January 1862 at 24 Lister Road at Kings Cross in Halifax, West Yorkshire, the son of a clergyman, the Reverend Richard Haking and his wife Mary Elizabeth. His early life and education is not known "and it is quite likely that he was taught at home either by his Oxford-educated father or by a private tutor". He entered the Royal Military College, Sandhurst, in 1880 and after passing through Sandhurst "apparently without much difficulty", was commissioned with the rank of second lieutenant. Haking joined the 67th (South Hampshire) Regiment of Foot (which that year became the 2nd Battalion of the Hampshire Regiment, later the Royal Hampshire Regiment) on 22 January 1881. Haking saw his first active service in Burma 1885–1887, when he was promoted to be his battalion's adjutant and was made captain in 1889. He married Rachel Violette Burford-Hancock, daughter of Sir Henry Burford-Hancock, on 28 September 1891; they had no children. The marriage took place in Beckenham, then part of Kent, when the 2nd Hampshires were based at Chatham on home service, having returned from Burma in 1888.

Haking then studied at the Staff College, Camberley, from 1896 to 1897 and his time there and the college itself "certainly made a great impression on him". It was there when he first encountered Douglas Haig, who would hugely influence Haking's later career. He was then made a deputy assistant adjutant general (DAAG) for Cork District from 1898 to 1899. He was promoted to major in March 1899. He served on the staff in the Second Boer War, initially as a DAAG. Haking later returned to the Staff College, first as a lecturer 1901–1904, then, from February 1904, as a DAAG until 1906. While at Camberley he was promoted to the temporary rank of lieutenant colonel in January 1901. This was made permanent in November 1903 and he was promoted again, to brevet colonel, in June 1905. Haking was then made a substantive colonel and became the assistant adjutant general of the 4th Division, in succession to Colonel Henry Heath, in February 1906. He was then general staff officer, grade 1 (GSO 1, chief of staff) of the 3rd Division until 1908, then, after being promoted to the temporary rank of brigadier general in June 1908, was brigadier general, general staff of Southern Command. He was honoured with the Companion of the Order of the Bath (CB) in June 1910. Haking was given command of the 5th Infantry Brigade, part of the 2nd Division, in September 1911.

According to Andy Simpson, in the Edwardian era, "he established a reputation as a sound tactical thinker". His book Company Training (1913) was partly inspired by Haig's 1909 Field Service Regulations. The book espoused the pre-war belief that morale and leadership were the most important factors in winning a battle. He also argued that the attacker would have the advantage over the defender, even if numerically inferior and deprecated the idea that modern weapons had made defence superior to attack. The book was reprinted during the first part of the war, at least. The book was considered "first class" and in Gordon Corrigan's view "even today ... has a freshness about it and an insight into human characteristics that would not be out of place in a modern military work".

== First World War ==
=== Brigade commander ===
Still in command of the 5th Brigade in the summer of 1914, when the First World War began, Haking took it to the Western Front, with the division forming part of I Corps of the British Expeditionary Force (BEF) (Lieutenant General Sir Douglas Haig, who knew Haking from their days at the Staff College almost twenty years before). On 23 August—the day of the Battle of Mons—in accordance with a request by General Sir Horace Smith-Dorrien, general officer commanding (GOC) II Corps, Haig sent Haking with three battalions to make contact with II Corps on Haig's left but Haking reported that he had made no contact with the enemy. He helped force the Petit Morin during the Battle of the Marne. During the advance after the Marne, the brigade was at the forefront at the First Battle of the Aisne and on 14 September his was one of the few units to fight its way onto the Chemin des Dames, after the crossing of the River Aisne.

Haig recorded that the 5th Brigade made good progress on the eastern slopes of the Beaulne ridges, reaching the ridge of Tilleul de Courtacon, before having to pull back on meeting opposition. On 16 September he received a head wound that required three months' recuperation. The brigade's war diary records:

Heavy shelling commenced at daybreak and continued unceasingly until 11:15 a.m. - mostly Howitzers (General Haking slightly wounded and obliged to go to Hospital).

=== Division commander ===
Haking, his wound having by now been declared "completely recovered", returned once more to the 5th Brigade on 20 November but this only lasted four weeks. On 28 December he was promoted to major general, "for distinguished conduct in the Field", and took command of the 1st Division of the BEF from Major General David Henderson.

The 1st Division took part in the Battle of Aubers Ridge (also known as the First Battle of Fromelles) in May 1915, where the three attacking divisions suffered 11,600 casualties, almost 4,000 of them being from the 1st Division and where he argued for further attacks despite the clear failure of the first attempt. His attacking brigades lost over 50 per cent of their fighting strength in little over an hour. Haking was not blamed for what Simpson describes as the "flawed artillery plan and lack of artillery support" at Aubers Ridge. With the BEF expanding massively in size, Haking was one of the divisional commanders (he was fourth in order of seniority after Thomas Morland, Henry Horne and Hubert Gough) whom Haig recommended to the Prime Minister, H. H. Asquith, on 8 July 1915 as suitable for command of corps.

=== Battle of Loos ===
On 1 September, Haig, commander of the First Army, recommended Haking, a "thruster", for command of XI Corps. (Note: The ODNB states that he was given the command in August 1915.) The promotion was not confirmed until 4 September, as Field Marshal Sir John French, Commander-in-Chief of the BEF, was ill. Haking, now a temporary lieutenant-general, held this command until the end of the war.

==== Preparations ====
XI Corps took part as a reserve in the Battle of Loos in September 1915. He later told the official historian, James Edmonds, that he had thought Haig wanted XI Corps to fill the gap between I Corps (Hubert Gough) and IV Corps (Henry Rawlinson) in the offensive, not act as a reserve at all. Before the battle Haking spoke to the men of 2nd Guards Brigade. One observer recorded that he "spoke very confidently, comparing the German line to the crust of a pie, behind which, once broken, he said, there is not much resistance to be expected. He ended up by saying "I don't tell you this to cheer you up. I tell it you because I really believe it". He assured his commanders that there would be no German resistance once their line had been broken (letter of Lieutenant-Colonel Rowland Feilding to his wife, 16 September 1915). Although "everyone was too optimistic", Haking's promises to regimental officers that there would be "very little opposition" were "altogether misleading" and a "most regrettable travesty of the real facts" (testimony of various colonels to the official historian in the mid-1920s).

The New Army 21st Division and 24th Division in XI Corps, were committed to battle but not the Guards Division which was held in reserve. The attacking divisions were tired and hungry after an overnight march to conceal their presence from the enemy, at 2:30 p.m. on 25 September, the first day of the battle. Haig requested the release of the reserve early in the morning, soon after the attack began and an order was indeed telephoned from GHQ after 9:00 a.m. French also insisted on visiting army and corps headquarters later in the morning to give his final permission. It also seems to be the case that poor traffic control prevented the reserves moving up. Nick Lloyd wrote that French was partly to blame for the confusion for not having decided when the reserves were to be released. General Frederick Maurice of GHQ later blamed himself for not having gone into sufficient detail when briefing Haking as he assumed that the reserves would be passing into First Army control and Haig's staff would sort the matter out. (Traffic control during offensives improved later.)

==== Second Day ====
GHQ released the Guards Division to the First Army at 1:45 p.m. on 26 September and it spent the day marching up to the front. Haking was ordered (at 11:30 p.m.) to submit plans for it to attack the next day. The next day Haig wanted to call off the attack but Haking felt it was too short notice. Haking also lifted the artillery barrage off the German front positions to bombard more distant targets at 3:00 p.m., an hour before the attack – Rawlinson, who visited him at 10:00 a.m., thought this a bad idea but kept his doubts to himself. Under pressure from Haig, XI Corps issued orders to the 3rd Guards Brigade that they were not to attack unless the 2nd Guards Brigade attack had succeeded but these orders were not issued until the former had already left their trenches. XI Corps suffered another 8,000 casualties on the second day. Blame for the decision to continue the attack on the second day lies with Haig, although Haking took his men forward without any doubts.

Lloyd wrote that Haking "proved unequal to the task" of welding XI Corps into a fighting formation. Poor relations between staff "do not reflect well on his managerial skills". Although Haking was not responsible for the attacks on 25 and 26 September, he offered no dissent to Haig's plans and his subsequent plans shared Haig's underestimation of the enemy and "traditional" view of artillery (i.e. that it was an adjunct to the infantry attack, rather than grasping the importance of concentrated artillery fire in making such an attack possible).

==== Resignation of Sir John French ====
The late release of XI Corps on the first day was thought to have thrown away a chance of breakthrough and decisive victory. French blamed poor First Army staff work and traffic control, while Haig alleged that French had released the reserve too late. Rawlinson had telephoned Haking at 12:20 p.m. urging him to get the reserves forward and wrote on the telephone log that Haking reported "traffic" difficulties. In a letter of 10 October, Haking blamed difficulties as his divisions moved through the administration areas of I Corps and IV Corps. Haking, after a meeting with Haig, claimed that this had been based on "memory of verbal statements made to [him]" by the commanders of the 21st Division and the 24th Division on the night of 25 September.

He now wrote, "...the most careful arrangements were made by First Army to ensure that the roads were kept clear". He then blamed "indifferent march discipline" (Haig blamed the delay on "bad march discipline" – a similar phrase). In the final paragraph of his report he wrote, "...there is none to blame except GHQ and they know it". Lloyd wrote, "...it is hard to avoid the conclusion that Haking was deliberately falsifying or "cooking" his evidence to make it more palatable to [Haig]". Haig's and Haking's slur was bitterly resented by a number of officers who spoke to the official historian in the 1920s about traffic congestion and poor direction by the Military Police.

Haking was also one of those who criticised French's deployment of the reserve to King George V when he visited the front in October, as part of the moves which led to French's enforced resignation. Simpson called Loos a "disaster" but "Haking escaped censure on this occasion ... he was ... quick to back Haig in the subsequent intrigues against French, and after Haig became commander-in-chief the security of Haking's position was not in doubt".

==== Subsequent attacks ====
On 13 October there was another attack that was somewhat better planned than the earlier efforts. Haking insisted that the attacking brigades be given precise orders as to their objectives and the direction and timing of their advance. Care was taken to see that troops were supplied with grenades, took machine-guns with them and that they kept communications trenches clear. The 18-pounder guns were to be kept in the front line to give covering fire as the men went over the top, a tactic used at the Battle of Festubert earlier in the year. At a First Army conference on 6 October it was agreed that XI Corps would be supported by "every available gun" and by smoke over a wide front (to force the Germans to disperse their fire). Attempts were also made to assimilate tactical lessons from recent assaults and in some divisions to train on scale models.

On 10 and 12 October, divisional artillery concentrated on wire cutting; the heavier guns bombarded German strongpoints. Haking persuaded himself that the enemy were "shaken and disorganised" ("little more than wishful thinking" in Lloyd's view) and that enough artillery and gas was available to win a decisive victory (the bombardment did little damage to the German positions). Haking gave optimistic speeches to the attacking brigades. On the day of the attack and apparently at Haking's insistence, the heavy guns were again "lifted" from the German front line an hour before the 2:00 p.m. attack, leaving them to be bombarded only by shrapnel – a tactic used by the Guards Brigade earlier in the battle. Haking ignored advice from Haig (on the telephone on 28 September) that this had been a bad idea, although in accordance with Army doctrine at the time.

Haig once again delegated the decision to Haking as the "man on the spot". Haking appears to have thought that High Explosive fire might disperse British gas (although gas was an adjunct to the attack) but he also wanted to give the Germans "a chance to run away". Edward Montagu-Stuart-Wortley, GOC 46th (North Midland) Division, in XI Corps, later complained that his troops had been "hurried into the trenches" with barely enough time "to become acquainted with the actual position". Haking overruled his wish to launch a careful step-by-step attack, telling him that he would "reach Fosse 8 without firing a shot", "seriously misleading the troops under his command" or else "simply ignorant". The attack went so badly that Lieutenant-Colonel Josiah Wedgwood sent a report to the Prime Minister.

==== After Loos ====
Philip Game, GSO1 of the 46th (North Midland) Division, wrote frequently in letters to his wife (10, 11, 24 November, 8, 10, 20 December 1915) of how Haking interfered in his planning. Game described Haking as "a vindictive bully" and "really impossible, untruthful, a bully and not to be trusted" (letters of December 1915 and April 1916). In May 1916 Haking complained that a unit had "dirt on their clothes" – they had in fact just come out of the trenches. Haking claimed in May 1916 that no division could be considered a fighting unit until they had carried out a successful trench raid. In John Bourne's view "Haking had already begun to achieve a reputation as something of a loose cannon ... he did more than anyone in the BEF to encourage trench raids and 'the spirit of the bayonet'". Haking launched the Attack on the Boar's Head (30 June 1916), which John Bourne called "an unnecessary and unsuccessful attack".

=== Attack at Fromelles ===
==== Plan ====
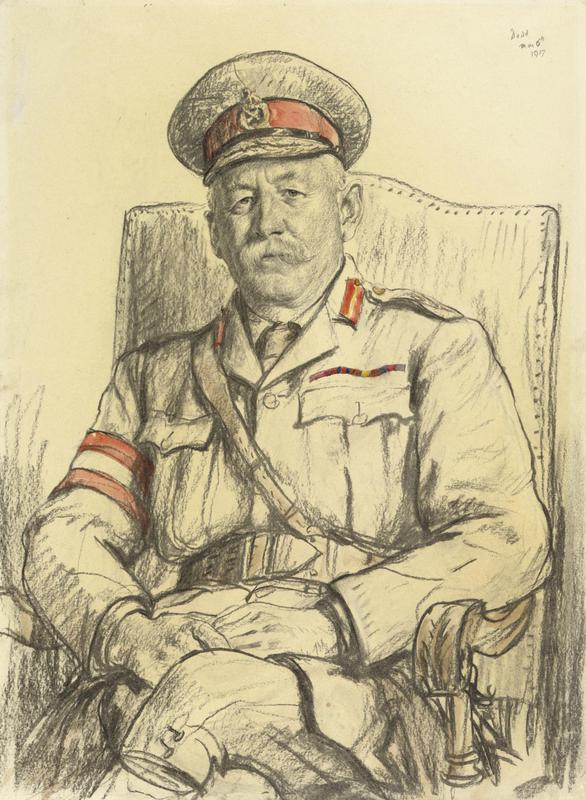
Three quarter length portrait of Lieutenant General Sir Richard Haking in uniform, seated with his legs crossed and his hands resting in his lap, March 1917.

Haking suggested a First Army attack towards Fromelles, not towards Lille as originally planned. John Bourne wrote, "...that (Fromelles) took place at all owed most to the ambition and willingness of Haking to carry it out, and his unshakeable confidence that it would work. Fromelles is difficult to justify as the point for an attack, even a feint attack" as it was flat ground, broken up by water obstacles and overlooked by Aubers Ridge. Fromelles lay near the boundary of the Second Army and the First Army, opening the possibility of participation by the Second Army, whose GOC, General Sir Herbert Plumer, was reluctant to stage a diversion at Ypres or Messines. Haking's plan did not take into account the earlier failure on the same ground in May 1915.

Haking "was most optimistic" about the Somme offensive (Millward War Diary, 22 June 1916). At a conference with his corps commanders on 8 July, General Sir Charles Monro (GOC First Army and formerly Haking's superior as GOC 2nd Division, in which the latter's 5th Brigade was serving, in the early days of the war) said that the Battle of the Somme was progressing "favourably" but ordered Haking to prepare a plan on the assumption that he was to be assisted by a division of the Second Army and some extra artillery (on the same day the 4th Australian Division was ordered south to the Somme but instructed to leave behind its artillery). Haking presented a scheme to Monro on 9 July for a two-division attack over a front of 4,200 yd (2.4 mi; 3.8 km), to capture part of Aubers−Fromelles Ridge, which lay a mile or so behind the German line. Monro rejected the plan in favour of a Canadian attack at Vimy Ridge but after pressure from GHQ – caused by the movement of German reserves from Lille to the Somme sector – informed Haking on 13 July that it was to go ahead.

That day Haking's plan was approved at a conference at Choques, attended by Major General Richard Butler (the deputy chief of the general staff of the BEF) with Major Howard in attendance, Major General George Barrow (the major general, general staff [MGGS] of the First Army) and Major General Charles Harington (MGGS Second Army). Plumer also approved the plan at another meeting that day and at a later meeting it was agreed that the bombardment – by the equivalent of five or six divisional artilleries – should start on 14 July, with a view to an attack on 17 July to capture and hold the German first line.

Haking learned that the Second Army was only giving him the artillery of the 4th Australian Division and the 5th Australian Division, not three as promised. Haking was also concerned at the shortage of ammunition and the inexperience of the Australian gunners. He reduced the width of the attack to around 3,500 yd (2.0 mi; 3.2 km), apparently in the belief that he had sufficient artillery to cover this front. Major General Harold Walker, commanding the 1st Australian Division, refused to let it take part in the attack, an act of "rank insubordination" which, in John Bourne's view, he might very well not have "got away with" had he been in command of a British division. Bourne comments that Walker's stand did not prevent the involvement of Australian troops, as the new 5th Australian Division (Major General James Whiteside McCay) took part – the division was inexperienced, not having been in France for long.

At a meeting with Haking, Monro, Plumer, Barrow and Harington on 16 July, Butler reiterated Haig's conditions that sufficient guns and ammunition for counter-battery work be available and that intelligence reports of the movement of German reserves meant that the attack was not as urgent. (Note: Major Howard, one of Haig's staff, had inspected the front on 14 July and Elliott (15th Australian Brigade) showed him the 400 yd (370 m)-wide stretch of no man's land, overlooked by the Sugar Loaf, which his troops were expected to cross. Howard reported his concerns to Haig and to Harington. Haig provisionally approved the operation on 15 July.) Haking was "most emphatic" that the troops were "worked up ... ready and anxious" to attack and that a delay would be poor for morale. Butler reiterated Haig's concerns in a memo of 17 July.

==== Preparation ====
Haking told his divisional commanders, at a conference on the afternoon of 16 July, that he wanted to avoid a repetition of what had happened on the Somme on 1 July, when the Germans had had time to man their parapets before the British crossed no man's land. The artillery was to stay "on, not over [beyond]" the German positions until the infantry attacked (although he thought that the bombardment over a relatively narrow frontage would "reduce the defenders to a state of collapse before the assault") and the infantry were to be deployed in no man's land ready to "rush forward together" when the signal was given. Haking issued a letter "to be read to all troops", although he "trust(ed) them not to disclose it to anyone". The letter gave details of the artillery bombardment, including plans for a feint – deepening of the range of the bombardment and "show(ing of) bayonets over the parapet" – to tempt the Germans from their front-line dugouts so that they could then be shelled again – and also disclosed that the objective was to be limited to the German first line. The plan was thus well known, even to "the Mademoiselles" behind the British lines, although in practice the Germans, holding the high ground, could see enough of the British lines to guess that an attack was coming.

The attack was postponed because of rain (which made it hard for artillery to register targets). Haking opened an advanced corps HQ at Sailly at 6:00 a.m. on 17 July – a sign that he did not expect the attack to be postponed for long. At 8:30 a.m. he sent a despatch in which, contradicting the assurances he had given, he admitted that many of the Australian gunners had never fired on the Western Front and that many of the infantry were "not fully trained" and "do not appear to be very anxious for the attack to be delivered". Eventually the start times (11:00 a.m. for artillery, 6:00 p.m. for the infantry attack) were fixed for 19 July. Although only the German front line was the target, plans were being discussed for further advances, possibly by night, in the event of success.

==== Attack ====
A "surprise" attack was launched after an 11-hour bombardment, at 6:00 p.m. on 19 July. The 61st (2nd South Midland) Division (Major General Colin Mackenzie, a Sandhurst classmate) with the 182nd, 183rd and 184th infantry brigades and the 5th Australian Division attacked and suffered 7,000 casualties. On the Australian left and centre the 8th Australian Brigade and the 14th Australian Brigade managed to cross no man's land and reach the German second line but then, forced to fall back by lack of reinforcements, suffered greater casualties from German enfilade fire in the retreat than in the original attack. The 15th Australian Brigade and the adjacent 184th Brigade suffered severe casualties crossing no man's land for no result.

==== Subsequent events ====
A further attack by the 61st (2nd South Midland) Division, scheduled for 9:00 p.m, was cancelled but one Australian battalion attacked alone and suffered severe casualties. This earned the undying disgust of the commander of the 15th Australian Brigade, Brigadier-General Harold "Pompey" Elliott, who had seen 80 per cent of his two assaulting battalions killed, wounded or captured by night-fall. Haking, in possession of incomplete information, ordered another attack the next day. Having received fresh information about the three brigades of the 61st (2nd South Midland) Division at 8:20 p.m. he ordered the 9:00 p.m. attack to be abandoned and that the 183rd Brigade and the 184th Brigade return to or remain in their front line.

The 5th Australian Division was ordered to consolidate its gains, ready to assist another attack by the 61st (2nd South Midland) Division the following morning and not to reinforce the 15th Australian Brigade but rather to withdraw any survivors of the initial assault. The orders were confirmed again by XI Corps HQ just after 9:00 p.m. Elliott eventually received orders, time stamped 9:25 p.m., telling him that he might withdraw the 59th Australian Battalion if he thought its attack unlikely to succeed. Elliott later claimed in his notes on the battle that McCay had only learned at 8:35 p.m., from the 61st (2nd South Midland) Division, that its attack had been cancelled, too late to stop the 58th Australian Battalion going forward and that blame lay with Haking. Paul Cobb puts the blame with McCay and his staff for not processing Haking's orders quickly enough.

While the 58th Australian Battalion were attacking, Haking changed his mind, again on the basis of fresh information. McCay informed him that the 8th Australian Brigade and 14th Australian Brigade were holding their positions in the German lines and a Royal Flying Corps (RFC) aircrew had misinterpreted flares, probably let off by Germans, as indicating the presence of BEF troops. At 10:00 p.m., Haking's chief of staff, Brigadier-General W. H. Anderson, met with McCay and his chief of staff, Lieutenant-Colonel Wagstaff. Haking ordered the 184th Brigade to attack the Sugar Loaf at 3:00 a.m. to assist the Australians, while McCay was authorised to reinforce his forward positions.

McCay had information about the 8th Australian Brigade and the 14th Australian Brigade but sent a message at 10:30 p.m. to Elliott, asking for information. Elliott was none the wiser, he knew that the 60th Australian Battalion were trying to hold on in the German lines but as yet had no information about the 58th Australian Battalion attack and replied (at 11:30 p.m.) that although he was concerned about German machine gun fire he was willing to make another attempt on the Sugar Loaf, provided he was reinforced by the 57th Australian Battalion. An hour later Elliott learned of the failure of the attack of the 58th Australian Battalion and notified McCay at once.

Haking cancelled the night attack at 12:10 a.m. after learning that the 61st (South Midland) Division had suffered too many casualties and that trenches were blocked with wounded men. At 5:00 a.m. a conference was held at Sailly, with Monro, Mackenzie, McCay and Barrow. During the meeting a report was received from the 5th Australian Division HQ and Monro and Haking ordered that the 14th Australian Brigade was to be withdrawn from the German front line rather than reinforced. Haking regarded the battle as over at 2:00 p.m. on 20 July, when the 5th Australian Division returned to the command of II ANZAC Corps. His advance Corps HQ at Sailly closed an hour later. Monro and Haking concurred with McCay's veto of a proposal (21 July) that an informal local truce be negotiated in the Australian sector to allow the wounded to be collected, although this was in accordance with official GHQ policy.

=== Aftermath ===
Four days after the battle, Haking's report accompanied Mackenzie's paper to the First Army Headquarters. He wrote that the 61st (2nd South Midland) Division was "not sufficiently imbued with the offensive spirit to go in like one man at the appointed time". He conceded that the 5th Australian Division had "attacked in the most gallant manner and gained the enemy's position" but added that they "were not sufficiently trained to consolidate the ground gained", a phrase which caused dismay in the Australian press and was quoted by C. E. W. Bean in the Australian Official History. He claimed, "The artillery preparation was adequate. There were sufficient guns and sufficient ammunition" and that "the wire was properly cut and the assaulting Battalions had a clear run into the enemy's trenches", omitting that on 17 July he had mentioned that some gunners had never fired on the Western Front and that many of the casualties resulted from machine guns fired from positions that the bombardment had failed to suppress.

Haking claimed that "the lessons to be learnt from the attack apply more to the Divisions which took part than to ordinary trained Divisions", "the attack, though it failed, ha(d) done both divisions a great deal of good" and that "with two trained Divisions the position would have been a gift after the artillery bombardment; with these two new Divisions there was a good chance of success but they did not quite attain it", omitting to mention that he had had a good Division (the 1st Division) in May 1915. He also wrote that "the attack ... has done both Divisions a great deal of good" and also listed the chronology of dates and postponements, claiming that he had been "directed to attack".

An intelligence report of 14 August wrote that no withdrawals of German troops had taken place from the Fromelles sector. Corrigan stresses that the battle "did prevent the Germans from shifting reserves south to the Somme battlefield, and cannot be said to have been without point". By 26 July Haking had received McCay's report and was more generous in his praise of the Australians, although he blamed the 61st (2nd South Midland) Division for failing to take the Sugar Loaf.

Sir Henry Wilson (diary 30 July 1916) described Fromelles as "a botch job". Captain Philip Landon told James Edmonds in 1938 that it had been "as good an illustration as there was of the reckless extravagance in expenditure of life (italics in original) which ruled the minds of some of the subordinate commanders, like Gen Haking, at this stage of the war", "the weakness of GHQ lay in not seeing that a Corps Commander, left to himself, would also be tempted to win glory for his Corps by spectacular success, and would be prodigal in using the Divisions which passed through his hands for this purpose". Colonel E. R. Clayton later said to Edmonds that Haking's "undue optimism was one of the direct causes of failure" of the attack at Fromelles. In the Official History, Wilfrid Miles, wrote scathingly of the lack of preparation and the pointlessness of an attack by inexperienced troops, to seize a position which they could not possibly have held against counter-attacks and blamed the First Army for not cancelling the operation.

In 1930, Elliott criticised Haking for exaggerating the amount of artillery that would be available and for attacking without surprise. He exonerated McCay and argued that Haking, after Howard's report (which Haig had annotated to permit the attack only on condition that sufficient guns and ammunition were available) had persuaded Monro, who in turn persuaded Butler and that Haking had been keen to win glory for himself. He also stressed how Haking had ignored suggestions from Monro that the attack be postponed because of the rain and was scornful of Haking's after-battle report. Simpson wrote that Fromelles was "a costly failure" but "although the Australian Official Historian blamed Haking for the affair, fault also lay with the First Army and the 5th Australian Division....".

In 2012, Michael Senior wrote that the objective of the attack was contained in the First Army Operational Order 100 (15 July),

...to prevent the enemy from moving troops Southwards [sic], to take part in the main battle....

Haking had ordered that the troops due to attack were to be told that,

The Commander in Chief [Haig] had directed XI Corps to attack the enemy in front of us, capture his front line system of trenches, and thus prevent him from reinforcing his troops to the South.

— AWM 4 1/22/4 pt. 1 in Senior

Senior wrote that historians generally judged that the objective of the attack, the prevention of German troops from being transferred to the Somme, had failed. Wilfrid Miles, the British official historian, wrote that the IX Reserve Corps and the Guard Reserve Corps had been moved to the Somme. (Note: In No Finer Courage: A Village in the Great War (2004) Senior had written that the attack had failed to deter the Germans from withdrawing divisions from opposite XI Corps and moving them to the Somme.) Peter Pedersen wrote that the Germans knew that Fromelles was a decoy and sent reserves to the Somme. In the Australian official history, Charles Bean wrote that the attack showed the Germans that they were free to withdraw troops. In 2007, Paul Cobb wrote that the Germans were not deterred from sending troops to the Somme.

In his 2012 biography of Haking, Senior wrote that he had only consulted the official history volume Military Operations France and Belgium, 1916 part II for his earlier book and had changed his mind after studying German records. He wrote that there was evidence that the transfer of troops to the south was delayed by the Attack on Fromelles. A German intelligence officer of the 6th Bavarian Reserve Division wrote on 20 July,

There are no signs of any immediate repetition of the enemy attack....However, judging by the general situation, a new push is not impossible.

— AWM 27 111/13 in Senior

A Bavarian document discovered in 1923 contained information that,

An order was captured declaring that the object of the attack was to keep German troops engaged in the sector so as to keep pressure from the Somme...a repetition of these attacks is therefore to be expected.

— CAB 45/172 in Senior

Charles Bean wrote in 1930 that the Bavarians might have been sceptical that the British would sacrifice 7,000 men as a decoy. The IX Reserve Corps and Guard Reserve Corps had been moved from the Souchez–Vimy area, 20 mi (32 km) from Fromelles, well outside the sector opposite XI Corps. Troops kept in the Loos–Armentières sector, opposite XI Corps, for four weeks after 19 July were held back as a precaution. German records showed that eight divisions were in the line between Loos and Armentières on 1 July and that two were sent to the Somme by 2 July, long before the Fromelles attack; the other six divisions stayed opposite XI Corps for five to nine weeks after 19 July. Had divisions moved earlier, the Battle of Pozières (23 July – 3 September) might have cost I Anzac Corps far more than the 23,000 casualties that it suffered. Senior concluded that because of the Attack at Fromelles, German troops had been retained opposite XI Corps as intended.

=== Passed over ===
Gary Sheffield describes Haking as acquiring a reputation as a "butcher" and an organiser of pointless "stunts". Haking was one of the few First World War generals to have gained this label while the fighting was still taking place rather than after the war ended. It has also been claimed that he acquired the nickname among Australian troops from his propensity for ordering trench raids and that "it is not even known how pejorative the appellation really was" given that among Australians "bastard" is almost a term of affection".

His promotions may have resulted from Haig's patronage but later attempts by Haig to obtain an Army command for him failed. Monro (3 August 1916) recommended Haking as his successor as GOC First Army. When it became known that Haking was the front-runner, Wilson – who had been acting army commander earlier in the year and who was also considered for the promotion this time – wrote (5 August) "it only shows how hopelessly out of touch GHQ is with what we all think of Haking". Haig placed Haking in acting command of the First Army from 7 August to 29 September 1916.

A letter from the Chief of the Imperial General Staff, General Sir William Robertson, (10 August) said that the War Committee vetoed Haking's promotion. (Note: The War Committee was a Cabinet Committee which discussed strategy in 1915–1916. Some accounts confuse this with the War Council, a gathering of soldiers and politicians which discussed strategy in 1914–1915.) The command went instead to Lieutenant General Sir Henry Horne. The affair may have caused a curtailing of Haig's powers to make senior appointments.

Haking believed that the Germans on the Somme were "very tired, confused & rather demoralised" and "in a bad way" (Wilson diary 29 August 1916). Haking and XI Corps took no part in the Somme, which Simpson argues "does not argue for much faith in Haking's competence ... at general headquarters". Haking was honoured with the Knight Commander of the Order of the Bath (KCB) in January 1916.

=== Later war ===
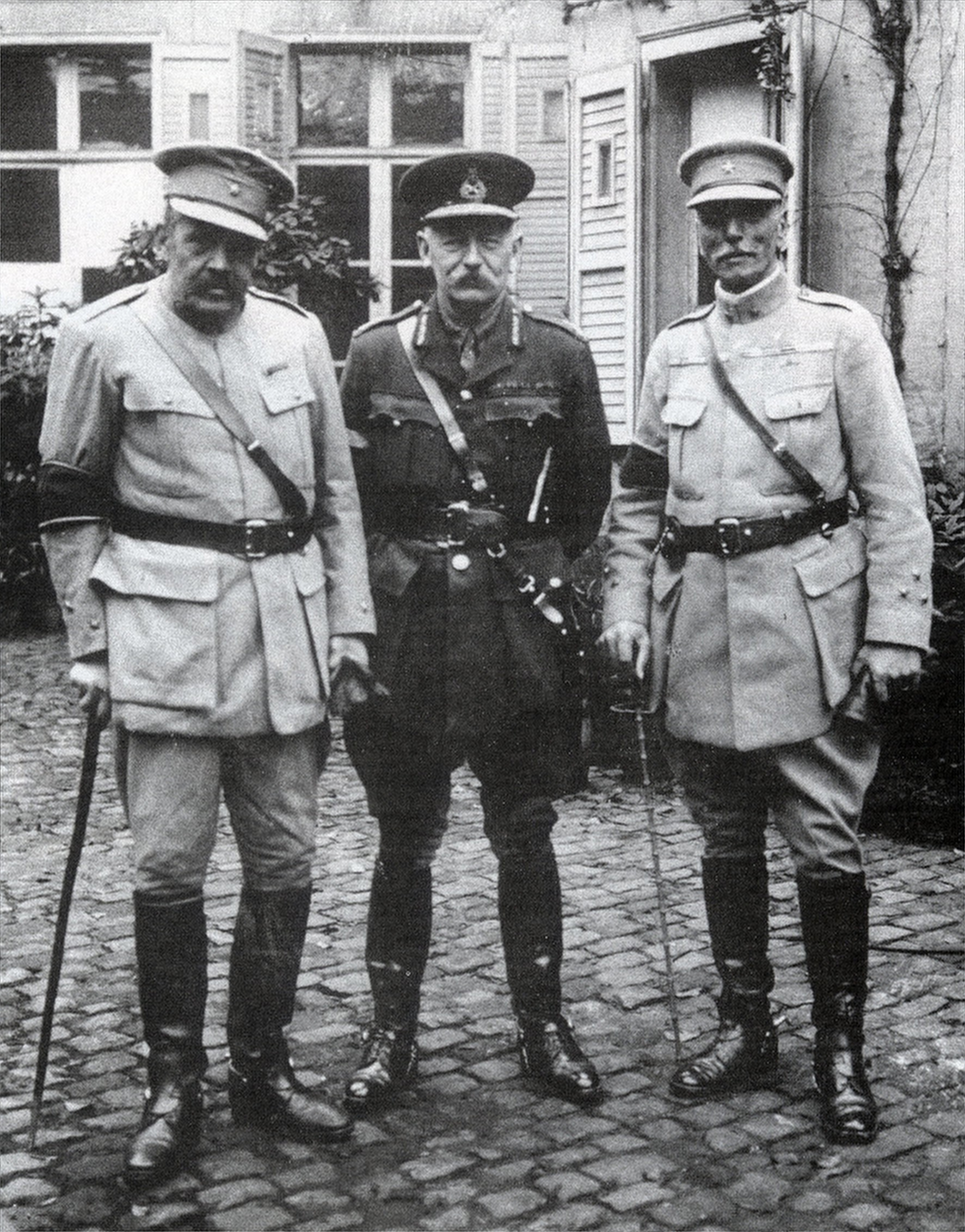
Generals Tamagnini and Gomes da Costa, standing with General Haking.

Liddell Hart later claimed that Haking had reported Lieutenant-General Robert Broadwood the commander of the 57th (2nd West Lancashire) Division in early 1917 for "lack of fighting spirit". Haking protested to Horne (GOC First Army) on 18 March 1917 about being expected to hold a four-division stretch of front with two divisions, putting too much strain on the units involved. Horne met with him to discuss his concerns.

After being sent to the Italian Front after the Italian defeat at the Battle of Caporetto from November 1917 to March 1918, XI Corps was returned to the Western Front and was stationed at Béthune. It was soon engaged in the German spring offensive. The corps protected the Channel ports, although some sections of the corps were all but destroyed by the German Georgette offensive. The 2nd Portuguese Division suffered 7,000 casualties and 300 officers (out of a divisional strength of 20,000) in the Battle of Estaires. Haking and his corps "did well" in the halting of this offensive. Haking was not a believer in "defence in depth" but Simpson argues that Haking "may well have been right" that defence in depth was not always the appropriate tactic, as the 55th (West Lancashire) Division (Major-General Hugh Jeudwine) under Haking's command – fresh troops holding old fortifications – were able to hold their positions and even establish a defensive left flank despite the rout of the Portuguese division to their north. (Note: Jeudwine claimed never to have heard of the "Battle Zone" tactics (defence in depth). Tim Travers wrote that Haking was as ignorant as Jeudwine but Simpson called this an error because Haking's written comments show that he was aware of the practice but did not agree with it.)

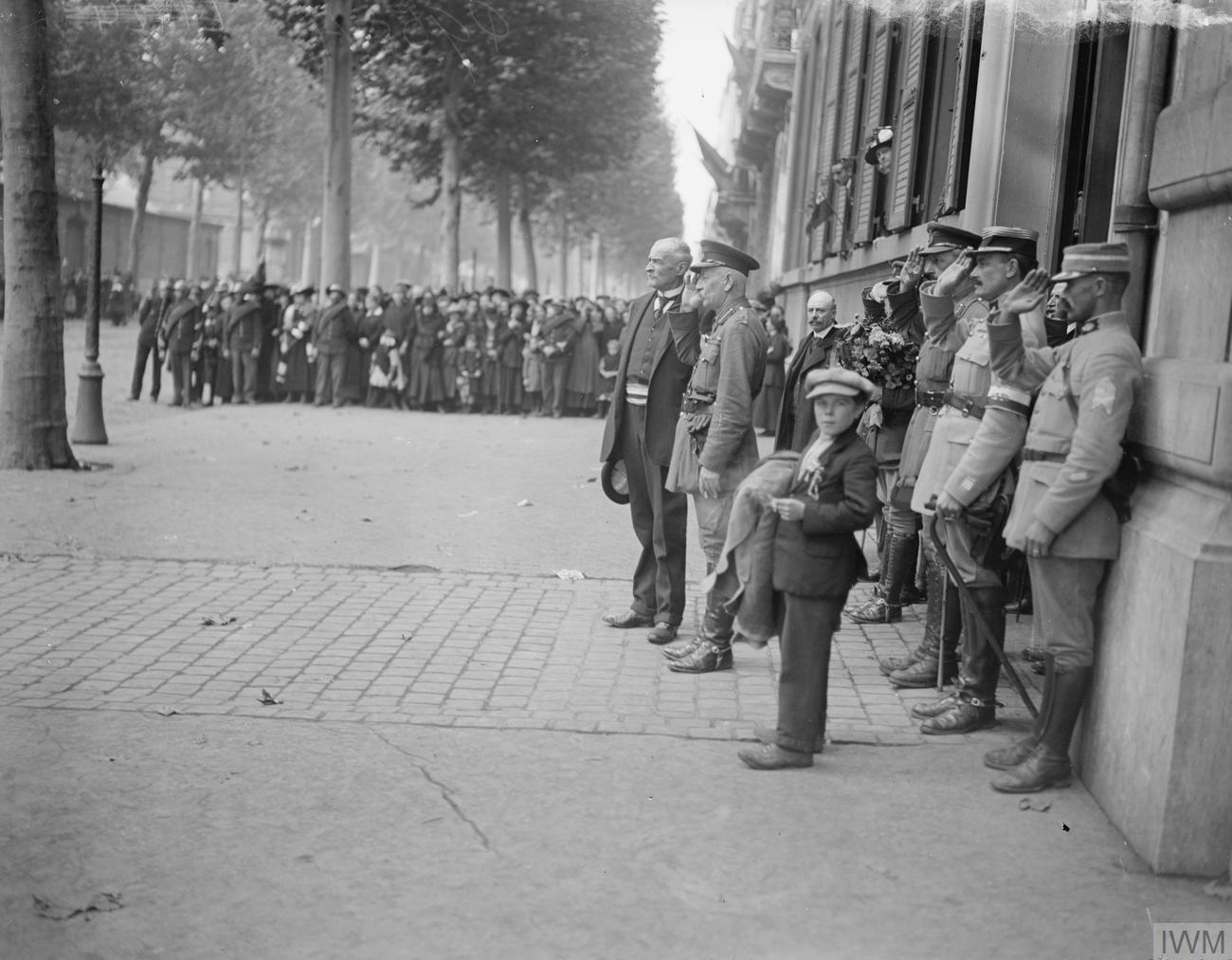
The Mayor of Lille and Lieutenant-General Richard Haking, GOC XI Corps, saluting the British national anthem outside the "Préfecture du Nord" at Lille, 18 October 1918. Note the firemen keeping back the crowd.

Lloyd George told the War Cabinet (11 April) that the Liberal War Committee (of backbench MPs) had made "very serious protests" to him that afternoon against the retention of "incompetent" officers like General Sir Hubert Gough (who had just been sacked after the Fifth Army had borne the brunt of the German March offensive) and Haking. Unlike Gough, Haking retained his command. General Gomes da Costa later wrote (in O corpo de exercito portugues na Grande Guerra: A batalha do Lys [The Portuguese Army in the Great War: The Battle of the Lys]) of "the esteem in which I held General Haking ... who always showed himself through his knowledge of the Portuguese language, extremely intelligent and clever, a fine soldier and a loyal friend".

Haking conducted a successful attack at La Bassee in June 1918. Simpson writes that his "performance continued to be far more convincing than earlier in the war". On 17 October 1918, XI Corps entered the line as part of the Fifth Army (General William Birdwood). Corrigan writes that that autumn Haking "earned a high reputation in the British offensive which ended the war", while Simpson writes that "(h)is promise before the First World War was never realised during it, but he undoubtedly showed far more skill with the soldiers of 1918 than with those under his command in 1915–16". Haking was honoured with the Knight Commander of the Order of St Michael and St George (KCMG) in 1918.

== Post-war ==
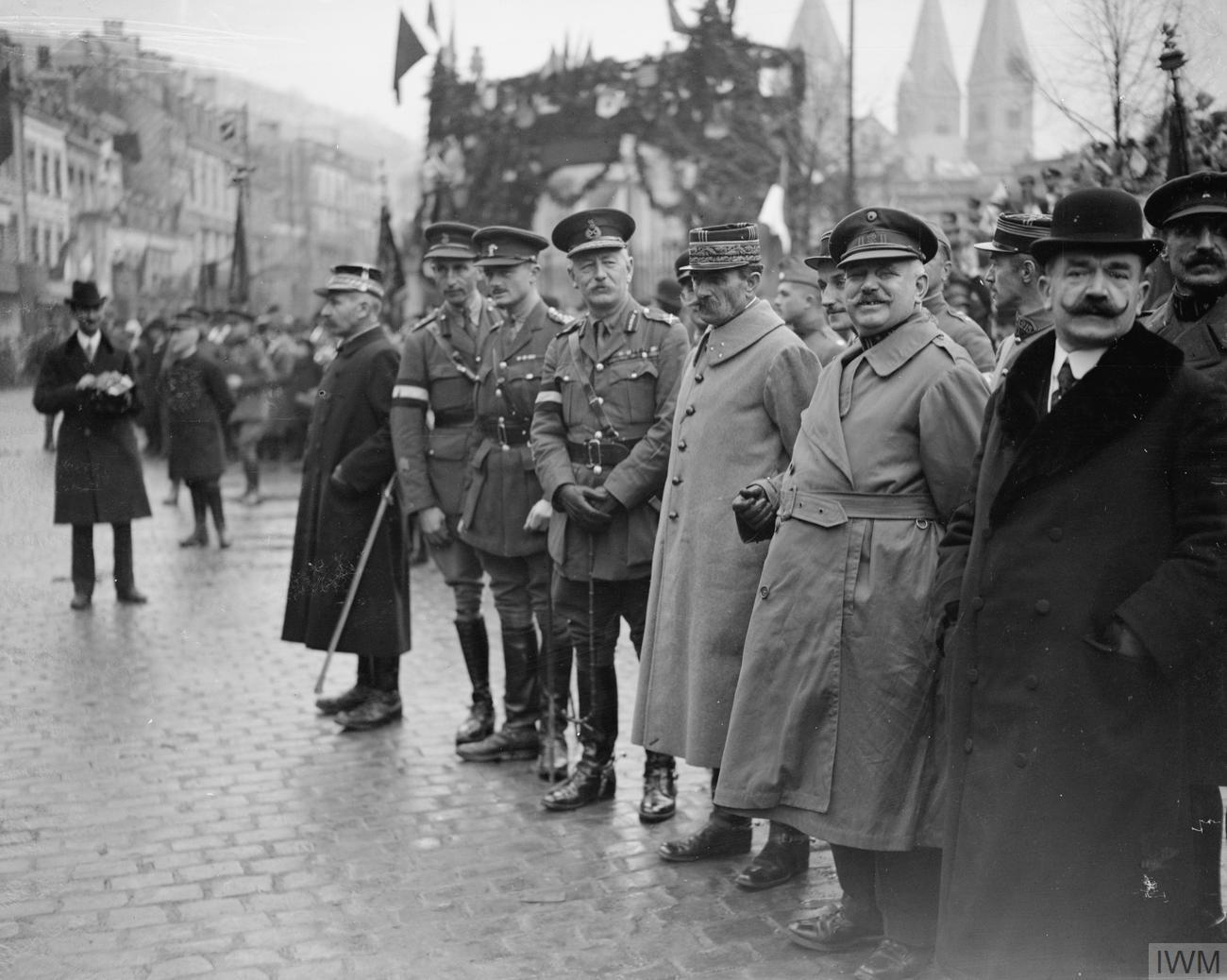
General Haking (4th from right) as member of the Armistice Commission in Spa.

After the war, in Corrigan's view, "his ... career was distinguished":he became chief of the British section of the Armistice Commission in 1918–1919, commander of the British military mission to Russia and the Baltic Provinces in 1919 and commander of Allied troops in the plebiscite area of East Prussia and Danzig in 1920, before becoming High Commissioner to the League of Nations in Danzig in 1921–1923. His rank of lieutenant-general being made permanent in January 1919, Haking was appointed a Knight Grand Cross of the Order of the British Empire (GBE) in the 1921 New Year Honours.

Haking became GOC British Troops in Egypt from March 1923 to 1927, at a time when Britain was trying to forge a new relationship with her Egyptian client state following recent unrest. During this time he was appointed colonel of the Hampshire Regiment in July 1924 and was promoted to the rank of general in May 1925. He relinquished his Egyptian assignment in June 1927 and retired from the army that month.

Haking died of secondary colon cancer on 9 June 1945 at Old Mill Cottage, Bulford, Wiltshire. The funeral took place at Bulford on 12 June 1945, with military honours. He left an estate of £5,579 12s 1d (equivalent to £208,000 in 2025).

== Sources ==
- Bean, C. E. W. (1941). The Australian Imperial Force in France, 1916. Official History of Australia in the War of 1914–1918. Vol. III (12th ed.). Sydney: Angus & Robertson. OCLC 220898466.
- Beckett, Dr. Ian F.; Corvi, Steven J., eds. (2006). Haig's Generals. London: Pen & Sword. ISBN 978-1-84-415892-8.
  - Bourne, John. "Chapter 6: Charles Monro Third Army, 1915; First Army, 1916". In Beckett & Corvi (2006).
  - Bourne(2), John. "Appendix One: Temporary Army Commanders". In Beckett & Corvi (2006).
- Carlyon, Les (2006). The Great War. Picador Australia. ISBN 978-0-33-042496-7.
- Cobb, Paul (2007). Fromelles 1916. Stroud: The History Press. ISBN 978-0-7524-5601-0.
- Corrigan, Gordon (2003). Mud, Blood and Poppycock. London: Cassell. ISBN 0-304-36659-5.
- Farrar-Hockley, Anthony (1975). Goughie. London: Granada. ISBN 978-0-24-664059-8.
- Lindsay, Patrick (2011). Our Darkest Day: Battle of Fromelles. Prahran: Hardie Grant Books. ISBN 978-1-7427-0192-9.
- Lloyd, Nick (2006). Loos 1915. Stroud: The History Press. ISBN 978-0-7524-4676-9.
- Matthew, Colin, ed. (2004). Dictionary of National Biography. Vol. 24. Oxford: Oxford University Press. ISBN 978-0-19-861411-1.
- Robbins, Simon (2005). British Generalship on the Western Front. Abingdon: Routledge. ISBN 0-415-40778-8.
- Senior, M. (2004). No Finer Courage: A Village in the Great War. Stroud: Sutton. ISBN 978-0-7509-3666-8.
- Senior, Michael (2012). Haking: A Dutiful Soldier: Lt General Sir Richard Haking, XI Corps Commander 1915–18, A Study in Corps Command. Barnsley: Pen and Sword Books. ISBN 978-1-84-884643-2.
- Sheffield, Gary; Bourne, John (2005). Douglas Haig Diaries and Letters 1914–18. London: Phoenix. ISBN 978-0-29-784702-1.
- Simpson, A. (2006). Directing Operations: British Corps Command on the Western Front 1914–18. Stroud: Spellmount. ISBN 978-1-86227-292-7.
- Travers, Tim (1987). The Killing Ground. London: Allen & Unwin. ISBN 978-0-85-052964-7 – via Archive Foundation.

Military offices
Preceded by Sir David Henderson	GOC 1st Division; 1914–1915	Succeeded by Arthur Holland
Preceded by Sir Walter Congreve	GOC British Troops in Egypt; 1923–1927	Succeeded by Sir Peter Strickland
Honorary titles
Preceded by Sir Charles Knowles	Colonel of the Hampshire Regiment; 1924–1945	Succeeded by Sir George Jeffreys
