= The Patient Assassin =

2019 biography by Anita Anand

- First edition
- Author: Anita Anand
- Audio read by: Anita Anand
- Cover artist: Matt Johnson
- Language: English
- Subjects: Indian revolutionary nationalism; Indian independence movement
- Published: April 2019
- Publisher: Simon & Schuster UK; Scribner
- Publication place: UK, India, US
- Pages: 384
- ISBN: 9781471174216

The Patient Assassin, A True Tale of Massacre, Revenge and the Raj is a 2019 book based on the life of Indian revolutionary Udham Singh. Authored by Anita Anand, it was published by Simon & Schuster UK in April 2019 to coincide with the 100th anniversary of the Jallianwalla Bagh Massacre in Amritsar, India.

== Publication ==
The Patient Assassin is a book by Anita Anand based on the life of Indian revolutionary Udham Singh. It was published by Simon & Schuster UK in April 2019 to coincide with the 100th anniversary of the Jallianwalla Bagh Massacre in Amritsar, India. It has 384 pages and it was launched by Scribner in the United States.

== Summary ==
The book is divided into two parts, covering 25 chapters, with a preface and a list of illustrations, endnotes, and bibliography at the end.

Anand's use of a number of archives, and interviews with people who knew Udham Singh, including Lord Indarjit Singh, have contributed to piecing together Singh's story. In addition, an account of Udham Singh's arrest, trial, and hanging are presented using documents released under the Freedom of Information Act.

The book begins with an account of 2013, when then UK prime-minister David Cameron visited the Jallianwala Bagh memorial in Amritsar, India. Anand then refers back to 13 April 1919, when Brigadier General Reginald Dyer's troops fired 1,650 rounds at an unarmed crowd in what came to be known as the Jallianwalla Bagh Massacre. Anand explains that her grandfather, Ishwar Das Anand, was one of the civilians in that crowd, and discloses that she has "grown up with its legacy". In 1919, Sir Michael O'Dwyer was the Lieutenant Governor of Punjab. Twenty years later, a man named Udham Singh would kill O'Dwyer, and in Anand's words "became the most hated man in Britain, a hero to his countrymen in India, and a pawn in international politics".

Part One has nine chapters and includes details of both Sir Michael O'Dwyer's and Brigadier General Reginald Dyer's lives, before giving the background and account of the Jallianwala Bagh Massacre. Sixteen chapters in Part Two complete the life of Udham Singh, tracing it from his childhood in Punjab to his travels through Germany, Russia, Mexico, California, and ultimately London in 1940, when he reached O'Dwyer and shot him "through the heart at point-blank range". He gives his name as "Ram Mohammad Singh Azad".

== Reception ==
William Dalrymple, who previously co-authored a book with Anand, compared The Patient Assassin with Kim A. Wagner's Amritsar 1919. In his review in The Spectator, he notes that both authors used a number of archives in their research. While Wagner's "style is coolly forensic and scholarly", he describes Anand's as "a more warm-blooded approach".

Anthony Khatchaturian in the Dublin Inquirer describes the book as "a straightforward narration of facts, many of them detailed and new". Kavitha Rao, writing for LiveMint, called the book an "immensely lovable tale" put together with "painstaking investigation". Rao adds that Anand's eye for fine details "humanizes Singh". Rakhshanda Jalil, in an article in India Today magazine, described the book as a "giant jigsaw", with a collection of myths and truths relating to Udham Singh's life.

Writing for Outlook, an Indian magazine, Nonica Dutta noted that the author opens a forgotten chapter of Indian revolutionary nationalism. The Indian Express reported the work as the "first competent biography retracing the elusive, enigmatic life" of Udham Singh.

Saudamini Jain, writing for Hindustan Times, noted that Anand had sought evidence from top secret British government documents and used an assortment of characters when piecing together the story of Udham Singh. Nandini Nair, in her book review at Open, called the book a "psychological thriller".

In The Guardian, Ian Jack questions the exact point in time that Udham Singh decided to take revenge. Without firm evidence that he was present at Amritsar on 13 April 1919, Jack suggests that a more precise title may have been "The Wandering Assassin". "Her book isn't perfect", Jack notes, questioning some of Anand's speculations and terminology.
