= Blowing from a gun =

Execution method

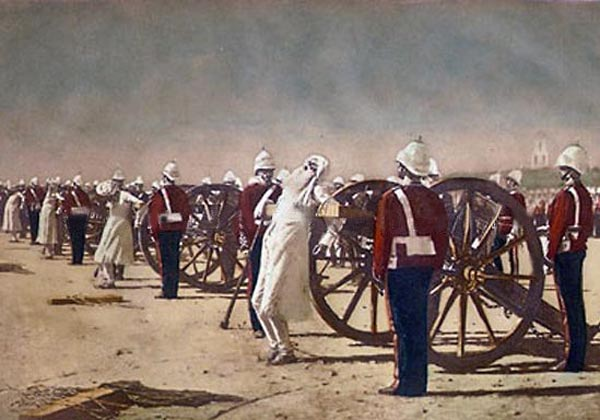
Blowing from Guns in British India, which depicts an execution by blowing from a gun by the British Army, a painting by Russian artist Vasily Vereshchagin c. 1884.

Blowing from a gun is a method of execution in which the victim is typically tied to the mouth of a cannon which is then fired, resulting in death. George Carter Stent described the process as follows:

The prisoner is generally tied to a gun with the upper part of the small of his back resting against the muzzle. When the gun is fired, his head is seen to go straight up into the air some forty or fifty feet; the arms fly off right and left, high up in the air, and fall at, perhaps, a hundred yards distance; the legs drop to the ground beneath the muzzle of the gun; and the body is literally blown away altogether, not a vestige being seen.

Blowing from a gun was a reported means of execution as long ago as the 16th century and was used until the 20th century. The method was used by the Portuguese in the 16th and 17th centuries, from as early as 1509 across their empire from Ceylon (modern day Sri Lanka) to Mozambique to Brazil. The Mughals used the method throughout the 17th century and into the 18th, particularly against rebels.

This method of execution is most closely associated with the British East India Company rule in India. Following the Indian Rebellion of 1857, "blowing from a gun" was a method the British used to execute rebels as well as for Indian sepoys who were found guilty of desertion. Using the methods previously practised by the Mughals, the British began implementing blowing from guns in the latter half of the 18th century.

Destruction of the body and scattering of remains over a wide area had religious symbolism as a means of execution in the Indian subcontinent, as it prevented the necessary funeral rites for Hindus and Muslims. For believers, the punishment was extended beyond death, and this was well understood by foreign occupiers. The practice was thus not generally employed by them in other territories across Africa, Australasia, or the Americas. Most recently, there was an exceptional use of the practice in Afghanistan in 1930, against 11 Panjshiri rebels.

== Rituals ==
A commonly reported method of blowing a person from a gun is to tie them in front of the muzzle of the gun and then have them shot. Loading the cannon with a cannonball is on occasion reported, but more often, the use of blank cartridge or grapeshot is attested. The following description of the manner of tying up the convicted is from Afghanistan, 7 July 1839, ordered by Shuja Shah, during the campaign against Dost Mohammad Khan:

The three men were then tied with ropes to the guns, their backs against the muzzle. The rope, fastened to one of the spokes of the wheel, passed with a knot round the arms, over the muzzle of the gun, round the other arm, and then to the spoke of the opposite wheel, which kept the body fixed.

Although immobilizing a victim in front of a gun before firing the cannon is by far the most reported method, a case from Istanbul in 1596 alleges that the victim was actually put into the gun and as ammunition. Reports exist of people occasionally fastened to rockets and launched into the air. This is said to have been the punishment for a Brahmin in the Kingdom of Mysore during Hyder Ali's reign (1761–1782), and in an 1800 treason case in the Maratha Empire.

== Problems with the method ==
Things did not always work out according to plan at such executions. At a mass execution at Firozpur in 1857, there was an order that blank cartridges should be used, but some guns were loaded with grapeshot instead. Several of the spectators facing the cannons were hit by the grapeshot and some had to have limbs amputated as a result. In addition, some of the soldiers had not been withdrawn properly and sustained injuries from being hit by pieces of flesh and bone. In another case, a soldier who was to be shot fell down just as the shot went off, with the following result:

One wretched fellow slipped from the rope by which he was tied to the guns just before the explosion, and his arm was nearly set on fire. While hanging in his agony under the gun, a sergeant applied a pistol to his head; and three times the cap snapped, the man each time wincing from the expected shot. At last, a rifle was fired into the back of his head, and the blood poured out of the nose and mouth like water from a briskly handled pump. This was the most horrible sight of all. I have seen death in all its forms, but never anything to equal this man's end.

Others reported how birds of prey circled above the execution place and swooped down to catch pieces of human flesh in the air, while others were nauseated by the dogs loitering about the place of execution and rushing to the scene to devour some of the body pieces spread around as a result of the execution.

== Mughal Empire ==
Blowing from a gun as a method of execution has a long and varied history in the Indian subcontinent, and many reports from the mid-18th century and onwards testify to its varied use. The execution method was used during rebellions and as punishment for a variety of crimes. Here, a focus is chosen upon the Mughal tradition of blowing from guns as a local tradition preceding, for example, the British tradition in the same subcontinent.

Several historians note that blowing people from the guns as a method of execution was an "old Mughal punishment" in the Indian subcontinent. Just prior to the institution of the reign of the first Mughal emperor, Babur, his son Humayun is said to have blown from guns 100 Afghan prisoners on 6 March 1526, in one incident of his father's many struggles against the Lodi dynasty. During the latter half of the 17th century, members of the Jat community in Northern India rebelled and raided against the Mughal Empire, and Emperor Aurangzeb is said in one account to have ordered one of their leaders blown from a gun. Purbeel Singh, said to have been the last Hindu chief of Umga, close to Aurangabad in today's Bihar state, was reportedly taken by an unnamed Mughal emperor to Aurangabad, and blown from a gun. The Sikh General Banda Singh Bahadur was finally vanquished in 1716 by the Emperor Farrukhsiyar, and after his execution, Banda's son was ordered to be "blown to bits by a cannon".

While the preceding cases are examples of rebels or military adversaries being blown from guns, the Mughal era also contained a few examples of using this form of execution for other crimes. For example, in a rather anecdotal story from the times of Jahangir (r. 1605 – 1627), the emperor had six mullahs blown from guns, for having consented to, and given approval of, the forcible abduction and marriage of a Hindu girl to a Muslim officer. In 1714, thieves were a severe annoyance to a marching army; a trap was made, and two thieves caught by the concealed guards were later blown from guns. During a siege in 1719, the problem of deserters was eventually solved for the commander of the Mughal Army by blowing four deserters caught in the act from guns, in the presence of his troops.

== Portuguese Empire ==
The Portuguese used blowing from a gun as a form of capital punishment in many of their colonies. A short review follows:

=== Sri Lanka ===
During the Dutch siege of Colombo in 1656, the city population endured extreme famine. One nursing mother became so starved that her production of milk stopped, and her infant was dying. She chose to kill it, and eat it. Once the Portuguese general became aware of her act of cannibalism, he ordered her blown from a gun, but in this particular instance, the clergy and the principal citizens dissuaded him from carrying out the act.

=== Mozambique ===
During explorer Francisco Barreto's 1569–73 campaign in Monomotapa, he at one time imprisoned some 50 Muslim individuals, and had them "impaled, blown from mortars, torn apart on tree-trunks, axed or shot". In mid-18th-century Tete, in north-western Portuguese Mozambique, the capital punishment for slaves is said to have been to be blown from guns, and, in the first decade of the 19th century, an inveterate raider chief was caught by the Portuguese and blown from a gun.

=== Brazil ===
In Brazil in 1618, an indigenous leader, Amaro, was taken prisoner and blown from a gun.

== British Empire ==
=== Before 1857 ===
The British had a long tradition prior to the Indian Rebellion of executing sepoys found guilty of mutiny or desertion in this manner. According to one historian, the British tradition began in 1760, when the British East India Company examined the modes of capital punishment in use. In the district of the 24 Perganas, it was found that the common military mode of capital punishment was flogging to death. Regarding blowing from a gun as an old Mughal punishment, the East India Company opted for this technique, as being, relative to death by flogging, more deterrent, more public and more humane. Already in 1761, orders were given in Lakhipur "to fire off at the mouth of a cannon the leader of the thieves who was made prisoner, that others may be deterred". Technically, in cases of court-martial, it seems that until 1857 the courts were composed of Indian rather than British officers, but it is added: "although they are presided over, and generally led and ruled, by the superintending officer, whose duty, however, is merely to transcribe the evidence, and assist the native officers with advice and counsel".

In March 1764, a subedar (native officer) secretly planned to persuade the men under his command to defect to an enemy force; his plan was discovered, and he was court-martialed and blown from a gun in front of his troops. In September the same year, major Hector Munro executed 24 or 25 "ring leaders" who caused a battalion to desert (the desertion being on account of "lack of rewards", "scarcity of provisions" and problems with climate and disease). Approving of the execution, one commenter said: "no disposition to mutiny was thenceforth manifested". In 1775, Muctoom Sahib, the Commandant of the 9th Native Battalion in the Madras Army, refused orders to embark on a transport ship for Bombay. Sahib also persuaded the men under his command to refuse to embark; he was subsequently arrested and charged with inciting the men under his command to mutiny. In February 1775, Sahib was court-martialled and found guilty; the court sentenced him to be blown from a gun in the presence of the battalion. Afterwards, the men previously under his command quietly embarked for Bombay while the rank of "Commandant" was abolished in the Madras Army. In 1782, mutinies broke out in Bardhaman and Barrackpore. Three mutineers were sentenced to death by the court in Bardhaman, two of them to be blown from a gun, the last to be hanged. In the Barrackpore trials, four of the five on trial were sentenced to be blown from a gun, while the last was to receive a thousand lashes and "to be drummed out of the cantonments with a rope around his neck". During the Third Anglo-Mysore War (1789–1792), six regiments mutinied over arrears of pay and placed their officers under confinement. When order was restored, two of the most active mutineers were blown from guns. Not only mutineers were blown from guns, but also soldiers found guilty of desertion, as is shown from a few cases in 1781 and 1783.

Not only sepoys were executed by being blown from a gun. In 1798, mutiny broke out among the British soldiers in the 1st Battalion of the Madras Foot Artillery. One British soldier was condemned to be blown from a gun. This, however, seems to have been exceptional, and one historian says that the soldier Forster is the only European on record to have been blown from a gun by the British.

In 1804, during a military engagement, the troops under lieutenant Birch's command refused to quit the ground of their encampment. Colonel Burn deemed harsh measures were necessary, convened a court-martial, and two of the officers involved were blown from guns and nine others "severely flogged". With full approval of the action, the writer observes: "a measure which, there is every reason to believe, had the best effect, as the corps behaved during the subsequent siege with the greatest steadiness and propriety".

In the 1806 Vellore Mutiny, beginning with a nighttime massacre of British officers and soldiers, many sepoys were killed during the suppression, while six mutineers were sentenced to be blown from the guns. In 1812, a plot was discovered at Travancore to kill the European officers; two ring leaders were blown from the guns, and several others were hanged. In 1819, six deserters who had joined the ousted rajah of the annexed Kingdom of Nagpur were apprehended by the British and were blown from the guns on 7 February. In 1832 Bangalore, a conspiracy allegedly designed to exterminate all Europeans was discovered. Out of some 100 implicated, four were sentenced to be blown from the guns, two others to be shot.

Sometimes, although a person was condemned to death, he might hope for a pardon or a commuting of the punishment. In 1784, a regiment mutinied over lack of pay. Lieutenant General Laing suppressed the rebels and ordered twelve to be blown from guns. The last of the twelve was very lucky, however: while he was bound to the cannon's mouth, the fuse was lit but burnt out three times. He then asked Lieutenant General Laing whether he was really destined to die in this manner, and Laing chose to pardon him. In 1795 Midnapore, five sepoys were condemned in court-martial to be blown from guns on account of mutiny, three others to be hanged. Their cases were appealed, however, and their sentences were commuted to be dismissed from service instead. In Barrackpore Mutiny of 1824, occasioned by the resentment of sepoys to being shipped to the front in the First Anglo-Burmese War, four days after the bloody suppression of the mutiny, one of the leaders, Bindee Tiwarree of the 47th regiment was found hiding, disguised as a faqir. In the ensuing court-martial, he was condemned to be blown from a gun, but instead he was hung in chains, and after his death his body was placed in a gibbet for a few months. In 1836, a sepoy was found guilty of having fled before the enemy and abandoned his European officers. Rungish was condemned to be blown from a gun, but the sentence was commuted into "transportation beyond the sea".

=== Indian Rebellion ===
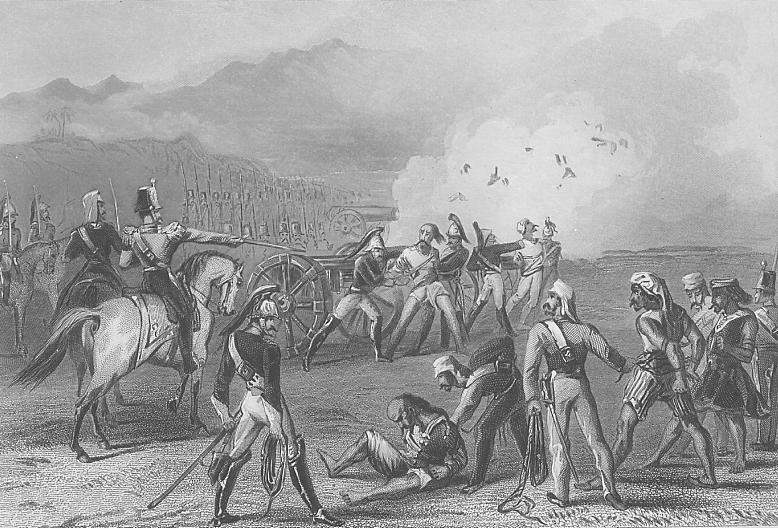
Execution of mutineers by blowing from a gun by the British, 8 September 1857.

This method of execution is strongly associated with its use by the British during the suppression of the Indian Rebellion of 1857. A sense of the scale and frequency of the executions made by the British during the 1857 insurrection is demonstrated in the reports of incidents given in the journal Allen's Indian Mail, for the year 1857:

On 8 June, two sepoys from the 35th light Infantry were blown from guns. 10 June, in Ludhiana, Peshawar, some 40 from the 54th regiment were blown from guns. On 13 June, ten sepoys from the 45th Regiment at Firozpur were blown from guns, two hanged. The same day, in Ambala, 10 sepoys from the 54th regiment suffered the same fate. The 26th of the same month, in Aurungabad, 1 was blown from a gun, 1 hanged, and 3 were shot. On 8 July, in Jhelum, it is assumed that captured rebels would be blown away. On the 19th, Aurungabad, 1 was blown away, 2 shot. On 5 September, Settara, 6 were blown away. On 17 September, Multan, 1 was blown away, 121 were summarily executed. On 23 September, in Karachi, 1 was blown away, 7 were hanged and 20 deported. (The local body count on court-martialed individuals then came to 4 blown away, 14 hanged, 22 deported and 3 beheadings.) At the end of October, in Rohilkhand near Agra, 1 was blown away. On 16 November, Bombay, two sepoys from the 10th regiment were blown away.

Per an 1859 paper to the British House of Commons on the rebellion in the Peshawar Valley in the Punjab, for the period May–September 1857, 523 were recorded executed, of them 459 shot by musketry, 20 hanged (13 for desertion) and the last 44 blown from a gun. Of those 44, four were executed on charges of desertion, rather than mutiny. Official July–November statistics for the area about Agra says that of 78 who were given capital sentences, two had their sentence commuted into imprisonment, whereas 4 were blown from guns. Other official statistics, this time from Indore, state that, of 393 sepoys officially punished, 32 were executed, 21 of them by being blown from guns. Several Britons also maintained that Indian insurgents had blown British civilians from guns during the rebellion. A specific case, mentioned by several sources, concerns that of Mr. and Mrs. Birch, Mrs. Eckford and Mrs. Defontaine, all of whom were said to have been blown from guns at Fatehgarh.

The skull of an Indian sepoy, Alum Bheg, who was blown from a gun was found in a British pub and is the subject of the book, The Skull of Alum Bheg: The Life and Death of a Rebel of 1857.

=== After 1857 ===
The Rebellion of 1857 was not the last time that British colonial government used blowing from a cannon as an execution method. In 1871, for example, 65 members of the Sikh sect Namdhari were executed by the British, by being blown from guns.

=== Natal, 1906 ===
When the Bambatha Rebellion broke out, a dozen Zulus were tried under martial law and sentenced to be executed on 29 March by being "blown up from the mouth of a cannon". Natal at that time was a self-governing British colony, and Lord Elgin, Secretary of State for the Colonies, contacted the Governor of Natal to ask that the sentence be suspended. This was seen as an unconstitutional interference by many in South Africa; the executive councilors of the Natal government gave their resignations in protest. Lord Elgin backed down in the face of public opinion, and the Zulu men were "blown to death" on 2 April 1906.

== Afghanistan ==
Within Afghanistan, a tradition of using blowing from a gun as capital punishment is attested from the early nineteenth century up to 1930. The practice was considered especially useful in Afghanistan, where "weak governance, rebellion, and rampant banditry all threatened the legitimacy" of the state. Some examples follow.

=== Durrani Dynasty ===
In 1802, the forces of Mahmud Shah Durrani inflicted a crushing defeat on the Ghilzai tribes, and to discourage further aggression, he ordered one leader and his two sons blown from guns, as well as building a minaret out of Ghilzai skulls. In 1803, when Shah Shuja Durrani ousted his half-brother Mahmud from power, he revenged himself on an ally of Mahmud, Ashik, by blowing him from a gun for having captured by means of treachery Shujah's and Mahmud's half-brother Zaman Shah Durrani, who had been king of the Durrani Empire prior to having been ousted by Mahmud in 1800. Following the restoration of Shah Shujah to the throne during the First Anglo–Afghan War, further executions by cannon took place. In 1841, an Afghan man was blown from a gun for the murder of a European writer. Later that year, an Anglo–Durrani expedition commanded by General William Knott captured a rebel leader, who was executed on the orders of Shah Shujah's son.

=== The Iron Emir, 1880–1901 ===
In 1880, Abdur Rahman Khan became Emir of Afghanistan, and he swiftly gained the nickname "The Iron Emir" for his perceived brutality and strong rule. For example, one source estimates that, during his 20 years on the throne, an average of 5,000 executions a year took place, several by blowing from guns. For example, in December 1889 alone, 24 are recorded as having been blown from guns, and many others executed in other ways.

=== Tajik reign of terror, 1929 ===
In January 1929, a new cycle of extreme violence broke out in Afghanistan when Habibullāh Kalakāni became emir. The British official Humphreys wrote: "None was safe, houses were pillaged indiscriminately, women were ravished and a reign of terror was established unprecedented in the annals of bloody Afghan history". Political opponents were often blown from guns or executed in other ways. Habibullah's regime was toppled in October 1929, and then the Kuhestani Tajiks were persecuted. An article in The New York Times from 6 April 1930 was headlined with: "Eleven Afghans Blown from Guns at Kabul".

== Modern usage ==
In the last weeks of World War II, German defector and war criminal Willi Herold, impersonating a Luftwaffe captain, ordered the execution of several prisoners of the Emslandlager concentration camp with an anti-aircraft autocannon.

It has been alleged by a defector that North Korea has used blowing from anti-aircraft guns as a method of public execution.

== See also ==
- Outline of capital punishment
- Posthumous execution

== Bibliography ==
- Abraham, V.W. (1858). The Indian News and Chronicle of Eastern Affaires. London.
- Adolphus, John (1840). The history of England. Vol. 1. London: John Lee.
- Afsos, Scher Ali; Court, Henry (1871). The Araish-i-mahfil. Allahabad: G.A. Savielle.
- Akbarzadeh, Shahram; Macqueen, Benjamin (2008). Islam and Human Rights in Practice. New York: Routledge. ISBN 978-1-134-05926-3.
- Alden, Dauril (1996). The Making of an Enterprise. Stanford University Press. ISBN 978-0-8047-2271-1.
- Allen, W.H. (1857). ALLEN'S INDIAN MAIL. London: W.H. Allen Press.
- Almon, John (1791). The Parliamentary Register. London: J. Debrett.
- American Peace Society (1858). The Advocate of Peace. Boston: American Peace Society.
- Anderson, T.C. (1859). "Andersons reply in". Notes and Queries: a medium of enter communication for literary men, artists, antiquaries, genealogists, etc. London: Bell&Daldy.
- Asiatic Journal (1837). The Asiatic journal and monthly register. London: Allen.
- Asiatic Society of Bengal (1847). Journal of the Asiatic Society of Bengal. Vol. 16. Calcutta: Baptist Mission Press.
- Atkinson, James (1842). The Expedition into Affghanistan. London: Wm. H. Allen & Company.
- Baillie, An Officer of Colonel Baillie's Detachment (1788). Memoirs of the late war in Asia. Vol. 1. London: Self-published.
- Bakshi, S.R. (1997). Kashmir Through Ages. New Delhi: Sarup & Sons. ISBN 978-81-85431-71-0.
- Baldwin, R (1785). The London Magazine Enlarged and Improved. Vol. 4. London: R. Baldwin.
- Ball, Charles (1859). The History of the Indian Mutiny. Vol. 3. London: London Printing and Publishing Company.
- Blakiston, John (1829). Twelve Years' Military Adventure in Three-Quarters of the Globe. Vol. 1. London: Henry Colburn.
- Boyar, Ebru; Fleet, Kate (2010). A Social History of Ottoman Istanbul. Cambridge University Press. ISBN 978-1-139-48444-2. - Read online, access date 2 May 2013
- Broome, Arthur (1850). History of the Rise and Progress of the Bengal Army. Vol. 1. London, Calcutta: Smith, Elder and Company, W. Thacker and Company.
- Butalia, Romesh C. (1998). The Evolution of the Artillery in India. Mumbai: Allied Publishers. ISBN 978-81-7023-872-0.
- Calcutta Review (January–June 1851). The Calcutta Review. Vol. XV. Calcutta: University of Calcutta.
- Campbell, William (1839). British India in Its Relation to the Decline of Hindooism. London: John Snow.
- Cullather, Nick (2003). "Damming Afghanistan". In Meyerowitz, Joanne J. (ed.). History and September Eleventh. Philadelphia: Temple University Press. ISBN 978-1-59213-203-4.
- Deerrett, J. (1783). The Remembrancer. London: J. Deerrett.
- Doveton (November 1843 – April 1844). The Asiatic journal and monthly miscellany. Third Series. Vol. 2. London: W.H. Allen.
- Duff, James G. (1826). A history of the Mahrattas. Vol. 3. London: Longmans, Rees, Orme, Brown, and Green.
- Edwards, David B. (1996). Heroes of the Age: Moral Fault Lines on the Afghan Frontier. Berkeley and Los Angeles, California: University of California Press. ISBN 978-0-520-91631-9.
- Ferrier, Joseph P. (1858). History of the Afghans. London: John Murray.
- Forbes, James (1815). Oriental memoirs. London: White, Cochrane & Co.
- Fremont-Barnes, Gregory (2007). The Indian Mutiny 1857–58. Oxford: Osprey Publishing. ISBN 978-1-84603-209-7.
- Government Records (1911). Government Records: Mutiny records. Correspondence and reports. Punjab: Punjab Government Press.
- Grey, C.; Garrett, N.H.O (1996). European Adventurers of Northern India, 1785 to 1849. New Delhi: Asian Educational Services. ISBN 978-81-206-0853-5.
- Havholm, Peter (2008). Politics and Awe in Rudyard Kipling's Fiction. Aldershot, England and Burlington, VT, USA: Ashgate Publishing, Ltd. ISBN 978-0-7546-6164-1.
- Hazārah, Fayz Muhammad Kātib; McChesney, R.D.; Khorrami, M.M. (2012). The History of Afghanistan. Vol. 1. Leyden: BRILL. ISBN 978-90-04-23491-8.
- Heathcote, T.A. (1995). The Military in British India. Manchester: Manchester University Press. ISBN 978-0-7190-3570-8.
- Irvine, William (1922). Later Mughals. Vol. 1. London: Luzac.
- Knight, Lionel (2012). Britain in India, 1858–1947. London: Anthem Press. ISBN 978-0-85728-517-1.
- Lal, Basavan; Prinsep, Henry T. (1832). Memoirs of the Puthan Soldier of Fortune. Calcutta: G. H. Huttmann, military orphan Press.
- Lee, Jonathan L. (1996). The "Ancient Supremacy". Leyden: Brill. ISBN 978-90-04-10399-3.
- Long, James (1869). Selections from unpublished records of government for the years 1748–1767. Calcutta: Office of Superintendent of Government Printing.
- Macready, Major Edward (1853). "Extracts from the journals of the late Major Edward Macready". Colburn's United Service Magazine. London: Colburn & Co.
- Muir, William (1902). Coldstream, William (ed.). Records of the Intelligence Department of the Government of the North-west Provinces of India during the mutiny of 1857. Edinburgh: T&T Clark.
- Munro, Innes (1789). A narrative of the military operations of the Coromandel Coast. London: T. Bensley.
- Noel, Baptist Wriothesley (1859). England and India. London: James Nisbet and Co.
- Noelle, Christine (2012). State and Tribe in Nineteenth-Century Afghanistan. New York: Routledge. ISBN 978-1-136-60317-4.
- Parlby, Samuel (1822). The British Indian Military Repository. Vol. 1. Calcutta: Church mission Press.
- Parliament of Great Britain, House of Commons (1859). Accounts and papers of the House of Commons. Session 3 February-19 April 1859. Vol. 5. London: House of Commons, by order.
- Philippart, John (1823). The East India Military Calendar:Containing the Services of General and Field Officers of the Indian Army. Vol. 2. London: Kingsbury, Parbury and Allen.
- Pogson, Wredenhall R. (1833). Memoir of the mutiny at Barrackpore. Serampore: Self-published.
- Ribeiro, João; Le Grand, Joachim; Lee, George (1847). History of Ceylon. (tr. from French edition). Colombo: Government Press.
- Roberts, Jeffrey J. (2003). The Origins of Conflict in Afghanistan. Greenwood Publishing Group. ISBN 978-0-275-97878-5.
- Rosselli, John (1974). Lord William Bentinck. Berkeley, CA: University of California Press. ISBN 978-0-520-02299-7.
- Russell, William H. (1860). My Diary in India, in the Year 1858-9. Vol. 2. London: Routledge, Warne, and Routledge.
- Sabahuddin, Abdul; Shukla, Rajshree (2003). The Mughal Strategy of War. Delhi: Global Vision Publishing House. ISBN 978-81-87746-99-7.
- Salt, Henry (1814). A Voyage to Abyssinia, and Travels into the Interior of that Country. London: J. Rivington. ISBN 9785877903920.
- Seton-Karr, Walter S. (1865). Selections from Calcutta Gazettes. Vol. 2. Calcutta: Government of India.
- Shrivastav, P.N. (1971). Madhya Pradesh District Gazetteers. Madhya Pradesh, Bhopal: District Gazetteers Department.
- Singh, Bhai Nahar; Singh, Bhai Kirpal (1995). Rebels Against the British Rule. New Delhi: Atlantic Publishers & Dist. ISBN 978-81-7156-164-3.
- Southey, Robert (1822). History of Brazil. Vol. 1. London: Longman, Hurst, Rees, Orme, and Brown.
- Tate, George P. (1911). The kingdom of Afghanistan. Calcutta: The Times of India.
- Thoman, Mauritz (1869). Mauriz Thoman's, ehemaligen Jesuitens und Missionärs in Asien und Afrika, Reise- und Lebensbeschreibung. Lindau: Stettner.
- Arthur Wellesley (1868). Arthur R. Wellesley (ed.). Despatches, Correspondence, and Memoranda of Field Marshal Arthur, Duke of Wellington, K. G.: 1825–1827. London: John Murray.
- Wilkes, John, ed. (1815). Encyclopaedia Londinensis. Vol. 13. London: John Wilkes.
