= Gordon Corrigan =

British army officer and writer (1942–2026)

John Gordon Harvey Corrigan MBE, FRHistS (30 June 1942 – 26 February 2026) was a British army officer and historical writer and broadcaster.

== Life and career ==
Corrigan was educated at the Royal School, Armagh, and the Royal Military Academy Sandhurst. He served in the British Army's Royal Gurkha Rifles, mainly in the far east, and reached the rank of major. Between 1980 and 1987, he took a break from military service, joining the Royal Hong Kong Jockey Club where he was clerk of the course at the Happy Valley Racecourse from 1980 to 1982, and Racing Secretary from 1982 to 1987. Corrigan was awarded the MBE in 1995 His last appointment was commanding the Gurkha Centre in Hampshire.

Following his retirement from the army in 1998, Corrigan became a freelance writer on military history. He also presented television documentaries, made speaking appearances and conducted tours of World War I battlefields. He was an honorary research fellow of the University of Kent, and the University of Birmingham, and a teaching fellow at the Joint Services Command and Staff College. He was also a fellow of the Royal Asiatic Society, a member of the British Commission for Military History and a liveryman of the Worshipful Company of Farriers.

Corrigan authored Mud, Blood and Poppycock, one of the more recent histories of the First World War which challenges a number of popular cultural beliefs about that conflict. Among the targets for his book are the beliefs that British generalship was incompetent, blinkered and reactionary and that the military justice system was unfair. The book received a positive review from historian Gary Sheffield. Corrigan later wrote Blood, Sweat and Arrogance: The Myths of Churchill's War in which he set out to demolish the "myths of Churchill's War". This book was criticised in a review by historian Piers Brendon, who wrote:

"his tone, occasionally sneering, often patronising and always cocksure, is particularly tiresome in someone so prone to error. He makes the elementary mistake of asserting, for example, that a Russian declaration of war against Japan "never came".

His 2010 book on the Second World War, The Second World War: A Military History received positive reviews.

Corrigan died on 26 February 2026.

== Published works ==
- Sepoys in the Trenches – The Indian Corps on the Western Front 1914–15, 1999 (ISBN 1-86227-354-5)
- Mud, Blood and Poppycock, 2003 (ISBN 0304359556)
- Blood, Sweat and Arrogance: The Myths of Churchill's War, 2006 (ISBN 0-297-84623-X)
- Wellington – a Military Life, 2006 (ISBN 1-85285-262-3)
- Loos 1915: The Unwanted Battle, 2006 (ISBN 1-86227-239-5)
- The Second World War: A Military History, 2010 (ISBN 1843548941)
- A Great and Glorious Adventure: A History of the Hundred Years War and the Birth of Renaissance England, 2014 (ISBN 978-1-60598-579-4)
- Waterloo – A new history of the battle and its armies, 2015
