= The Amritsar Massacre: The Untold Story of One Fateful Day =

2011 book

- Author: Nick Lloyd
- Language: English
- Subject: Jallianwalla Bagh Massacre
- Genre: History
- Publication date: 2011
- Publication place: United Kingdom

The Amritsar Massacre: The Untold Story of One Fateful Day is a book about the Jallianwalla Bagh Massacre, authored by Nick Lloyd and published by I.B. Tauris in 2011.
