= Kim A. Wagner =

Danish-British historian

Kim Ati Wagner
- Born: Denmark
- Occupation: Historian

Academic background
- Education: University of Cambridge
- Thesis: Thuggee and the 'construction' of crime in early nineteenth century India. (2004)
- Doctoral advisor: Christopher Bayly

Academic work
- Discipline: Historian
- Sub-discipline: South Asian history
- Institutions: Queen Mary University of London
- Notable works: Thuggee (2007); The Skull of Alum Bheg (2017); Amritsar 1919 (2019)
- Website: Official website

Kim Ati Wagner is a Danish-British historian of colonial India and the British Empire at Queen Mary University of London. He has written a number of books on India, starting with Thuggee: Banditry and the British in early nineteenth-century India in 2007. He followed that up with a source book on Thuggee and has also written on the uprising of 1857 and the Amritsar massacre. A British citizen, Wagner feels an affinity for India.

== Early life ==
Wagner is of Danish origin and has lived in the United Kingdom for over twenty years. He is named after the leading character from Rudyard Kipling's novel Kim, set in British India, and was taken to India by his parents when he was a baby. Wagner says he has visited Amritsar many times and feels that India is "in [his] blood".

== Career ==
In 2003, under the supervision of Christopher Bayly, he gained a PhD in South Asian history from the University of Cambridge. He subsequently completed a four-year research fellowship at King's College there, followed by a two-year research associate post at the University of Edinburgh. Wagner then became a lecturer in imperial and World history at the University of Birmingham, before being employed at Queen Mary's in 2012. In 2015 he was granted a Marie Skłodowska-Curie Global Fellowship working with historian Dane Kennedy at George Washington University in the United States, which he finished in 2018.

=== Thuggee ===
His book on thuggee, titled Thuggee: Banditry and the British in early nineteenth-century India, was published in 2007 and was short-listed for the History Today Book of the Year Award in 2008. He followed that up with a source book on thuggee titled Stranglers and Bandits: A Historical Anthology of Thuggee (2009).

=== Skull of Alum Bheg ===
In 2014, he was approached by the owners of the Lord Clyde pub in Kent, who wished to dispose of a skull in their possession. An accompanying note revealed the skull to be that of sepoy Alum Bheg of the Bengal Regiment, who, following the Indian Rebellion of 1857, was executed in 1858 by being blown from a cannon in Sialkot. Wagner had the skull examined at the Natural History Museum in London, who confirmed its likely authenticity. Subsequently, with no known descendants of Bheg and with no official documents mentioning him, Wagner pieced together the story of the skull using letters written by the relatives and friends of Bheg's victims, in addition to other primary material in England and India. The Skull of Alum Bheg: The Life and Death of a Rebel of 1857 was completed and published in 2017. Wagner later expressed a wish for the skull to be repatriated back to India to be "buried in a respectful manner".

=== Amritsar 1919 ===
His book, Amritsar 1919: An Empire of Fear and the Making of a Massacre (2019), describes how the Jallianwalla Bagh Massacre was a result of a British fear of another Indian rebellion of 1857. With the book, Wagner aimed to dispel what he saw as myths about the massacre. The book was highly commended by the journalists Sathnam Sanghera and Trevor Grundy.

Both Grundy and Ferdinand Mount compared Wagner's book on the massacre with The Amritsar Massacre: The Untold Story of One Fateful Day (2011) by Nick Lloyd and with Nigel Collett's The Butcher of Amritsar (2005). While Wagner emphasised that it was "brutality" in general that was the "driving principle of the Raj" rather than the personality of individuals, Mount argued that Wagner had underplayed the personality of General Dyer.

== Selected publications ==
=== Books ===
- Thuggee: Banditry and the British in Early Nineteenth-Century India. Palgrave Macmillan, Basingstoke, 2007. doi:10.1057/9780230590205, ISBN 9781349361540
- Stranglers and Bandits: A Historical Anthology of Thuggee. Oxford University Press, New Delhi, 2009. (Editor) ISBN 9780195698152
- Rumours and Rebels: A New History of the Indian Uprising of 1857. Peter Lang, Oxford, 2017. ISBN 9781906165895
- The Skull of Alum Bheg: The Life and Death of a Rebel of 1857. Oxford University Press, Oxford, 2018. ISBN 9780190870232
- Amritsar 1919: An Empire of Fear and the Making of a Massacre. Yale University Press, New Haven, 2019. ISBN 9780300200355
- Massacre in the Clouds. New York, NY: Public Affairs. 7 May 2024. ISBN 978-1-5417-0149-6. OCLC 1396550857.

=== Articles ===
- "Expanding Bullets and Savage Warfare", History Workshop Journal, Issue 88 (Autumn 2019), pp. 281–287. doi:10.1093/hwj/dbz044
- "Review of Nicholas Lloyd's The Amritsar Massacre: The Untold Story of One Fateful Day", (review no. 1224).
- Wagner, Kim A. (17 June 2024). "A Notorious Photograph From a US Massacre in the Philippines Reveals an Ugly Truth". New Lines Magazine.
