= A Social History of Ottoman Istanbul =

2010 non-fiction book by Ebru Boyar and Kate Fleet

A Social History of Ottoman Istanbul is a non-fiction book by Ebru Boyar and Kate Fleet, published in 2010 by Cambridge University Press.

The book covers the period of Ottoman rule, beginning in 1453 and ending in 1922.

== Contents ==
An outline of Ottoman history, maps, and biographical details are included in the work's initial portion. Nina Ergin of Koç University stated that "The authors do not assume that their readers are familiar with Ottoman history."

== Reception ==
Ergin praised the book, arguing that it is "so captivating and engagingly written that it is hard to put it down".

Donald Quataert of Binghamton University criticised the lack of differentiation of details by time period and the reliance of sourcing via primary sources as opposed to secondary sources.
