= The Skull of Alum Bheg =

Historical fiction novel

The Skull of Alum Bheg: The Life and Death of a Rebel of 1857
- Author: Kim A. Wagner
- Published: 2017
- Publisher: C. Hurst & Co.
- Pages: 256
- ISBN: 9-7818-4904-8705

The Skull of Alum Bheg: The Life and Death of a Rebel of 1857, is a book by Kim A. Wagner, a lecturer on colonial India and the British Empire. It was published in 2017 by C. Hurst & Co., and is based on the life of Havildar Alum Bheg, a sepoy of the 46th Regiment of the Bengal Native Infantry, who following the Indian Rebellion of 1857 and being said to have killed a British missionary family in Punjab, was executed by the British by being blown from a cannon.

His skull was subsequently taken to Ireland before being discovered in the Lord Clyde pub in Walmer, Kent, in 1963. It remained there until it was given to Wagner in 2014 by the pub's owners. The Natural History Museum confirmed its likely authenticity and Wagner, with little evidence to go on, traced Bheg's history using various sources including letters written by the relatives and friends of Bheg's alleged victims.

== Publication ==
The Skull of Alum Bheg was authored by Kim A. Wagner and published in 2017 by C. Hurst & Co. It has 256 pages and is available in hardback and paperback. The book contains a prologue, introduction, eleven chapters and an epilogue.

== Summary ==
Wagner traces the story of Havildar Alum Bheg, also called Alim Beg, a sepoy of the 46th Regiment of Bengal Native Infantry, who following the Indian Rebellion of 1857 and being said to have killed the Britons, surgeon James Graham, missionary Thomas Hunter and Hunter's wife and daughters in Punjab, was executed by the British by being blown from a cannon. His skull was then taken to Ireland by a Captain Costello, who was on duty during his execution. In 1963, the skull was found in the Lord Clyde pub in Walmer, Kent and remained there until it was given to Wagner in 2014, by the pub's owners. By the time Wagner received it, the lower jaw and most of the teeth were missing. A note was found in the eye socket of the skull:

Skull of Havildar "Alum Bheg," 46th Regt. Bengal N. Infantry who was blown away from a gun, amongst several others of his Regt. He was a principal leader in the mutiny of 1857 & of a most ruffianly disposition. He took possession (at the head of a small party) of the road leading to the fort, to which place all the Europeans were hurrying for safety. His party surprised and killed Dr. Graham shooting him in his buggy by the side of his daughter. His next victim was the Rev. Mr. Hunter, a missionary, who was flying with his wife and daughters in the same direction. He murdered Mr Hunter, and his wife and daughters after being brutally treated were butchered by the road side. Alum Bheg was about 32 years of age; 5 feet 7 ½ inches high and by no means an ill looking native. The skull was brought home by Captain (AR) Costello (late Capt. 7th Drag. Guards), who was on duty when Alum Bheg was executed.

The pub's owners had felt uneasy keeping the skull and sought the expertise of Wagner after hearing about his research on the British Empire. Wagner later reported "and so it was I found myself standing in a small train station in Essex with a human skull in my bag. Not just any other skull but one directly related to a part of history that I write about and that I teach my students every year". The Natural History Museum confirmed its likely authenticity and Wagner, with little evidence to go by, traced Bheg's history using letters written by the relatives and friends of Bheg's alleged victims.

Wagner confirmed that Alum Bheg was present at the rebellion at Sialkot, British India, in July 1857, an event about which little has been written. The absence of Alum Bheg from historical records led Wagner to narrate an account of thousands of Indian soldiers like Bheg, who revolted in 1857. However, he says "truth is that the outbreak at Sialkot was a highly contingent and confused event, and one that in many ways differed from places [such as] Meerut, Delhi and elsewhere. At Sialkot there was … no lynching of isolated sahibs, no sexual attack on memsahibs and no mutilation of their corpses. Though many opportunities presented [themselves], sepoys did not take part in any such thing".

The book includes a chapter on the colonial method of blowing from a cannon, a form of punishment designed to shatter bodies, making traditional funeral rites impossible for both Hindus and Muslims. There is also a chapter on the collection of skulls from other colonies.

Wagner reported that his "research revealed several surprising discoveries, not least of which was that Alum Bheg was most likely innocent of the crimes for which he was executed".

The book concludes with Wagner's wish for the skull to be repatriated back to India to be "buried in a respectful manner", preferably near the Ravi River, where Bheg was known to have been involved in the Battle of Trimmu Ghat.

== Reception ==
Shaun Doherty of the Socialist Review described the book as "meticulously researched" and "well-documented" with a "gripping narrative that brings to life the human aspects of imperial domination". Historian Yasmin Khan reported that it "reads like a detective novel and yet is also an important contribution to understanding British rule and the extent of colonial violence".
