= Anita Anand (journalist) =

British radio and television presenter and journalist

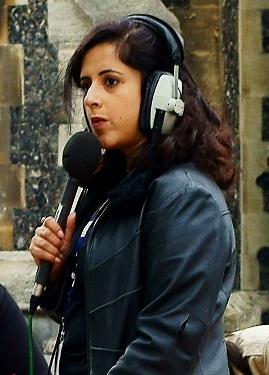
- Anand in 2011
- Born: 28 April 1972 (age 54); London, England
- Education: Bancroft's School; King's College, London
- Occupations: Radio and television presenter, journalist, and author
- Spouse: Simon Singh (m. 2007)
- Children: 2
- Website: www.anitaanand.net

Anita Anand (/ˈɑːnənd/ AH-nand; born 28 April 1972) is a British radio and television presenter, journalist, and author.

Since 2022, she has co-hosted the history podcast Empire alongside William Dalrymple. In 2025, she presented and chaired the BBC Radio 4 Reith Lectures series.

== Early life and education ==
Anand was born in 1972 in London, England, to Punjabi parents who migrated to India shortly after the partition of India and then, later, to the UK. Her family, prior to the partition, originated from a village near the Northwest Frontier Province and Afghanistan. She was raised in a family fluent in Hindustani (Hindi/Urdu).

Anand was privately educated at Bancroft's School in Woodford Green in Redbridge, east London. Anand then entered King's College, London, in 1990, graduating with a BA in English in 1993.

== Career ==
After training as a journalist, Anand became European Head of News and Current Affairs for Zee TV, and one of the youngest TV news editors in Britain at the age of 25. She presented the talk show The Big Debate and was political correspondent for Zee TV presenting the Raj Britannia series – 31 documentaries chronicling the political aspirations of the Asian community in the most marginal constituencies in 1997.

Until October 2007, Anand presented in the 10:00 pm till 1:00 am slot on Monday to Thursday on BBC Radio 5 Live. She went on to co-present the station's weekday Drive (4:00–7:00 pm) slot with Peter Allen, having succeeded Jane Garvey in 2007. Aasmah Mir replaced her when she left for maternity leave.

Anand has presented the BBC Radio 4 show Midweek, and on television she has been a presenter on the Heaven and Earth Show. She has co-presented the Daily Politics on BBC Two with Andrew Neil from September 2008, with a break for maternity leave from January to September 2010.

In July 2011 Anand left the Daily Politics to present a new show called Double Take on Radio 5 Live on Sunday mornings. In June 2012, Anand took over from Jonathan Dimbleby as the presenter of Radio 4's Any Answers? Saturday current affairs phone-in programme between 2:00 and 2:45 pm.

In 2022, Anand collaborated with historian William Dalrymple to create the podcast Empire, which initially described and discussed the British East India Company and British involvement and influence on India. The pair had previously worked together on the book Koh-i-Noor: The History of the World's Most Infamous Diamond.

== Newspaper journalism ==
Anand has also written articles for India Today and The Asian Age, and used to write a regular column in The Guardian ("Anita Anand's Diary", 2004–2005).

== Podcasts and Reith Lectures (2022–present) ==
In August 2022, Anand co-launched the history podcast Empire alongside William Dalrymple, produced by Goalhanger Podcasts. The show initially debuted with an investigative series tracking the history of the East India Company and the British Raj, heavily utilizing the research from her 2019 book The Patient Assassin. The podcast subsequently expanded to cover broader global imperial history, including the Ottoman, Roman, and Russian empires. The series achieved widespread international success, amassing over 40 million downloads globally and frequently topping historical audio charts for its exploration of colonial history from both a British and South Asian lens.

In late 2025, Anand presented and chaired the annual BBC Radio 4 Reith Lectures, titled "Moral Revolution" and featuring Dutch historian Rutger Bregman. The four-part series was recorded in front of public audiences across London, Liverpool, Edinburgh, and Stanford University.

== Publications ==
- Anand, Anita. (2015) Sophia: Princess, Suffragette, Revolutionary. Bloomsbury Publishing, ISBN 978-1408835456. It tells the story of the Indian princess Sophia Duleep Singh, granddaughter of the last Sikh Maharani and Maharaja of Lahore. She was born in exile in England, and went on to struggle for causes including Indian independence, the welfare of Indian soldiers in the First World War and women's suffrage. Anand also presented Sophia, Suffragette Princess, a 30-minute television documentary programme based on the book, which aired first on BBC One in late November 2015.
- Dalrymple, William; Anand, Anita (2017). Koh-i-Noor: The History of the World's Most Infamous Diamond. Bloomsbury Publishing, ISBN 978-1-63557-076-2.
- Anand, Anita (2019). The Patient Assassin: A True Tale of Massacre, Revenge and the Raj. Simon and Schuster (UK) Scribner (US), ISBN 9781471174216. It is based on the life of Indian revolutionary Udham Singh and the Amritsar massacre of 1919.

== Awards ==
On 18 November 2005, Anand won the Nazia Hassan Award for 2005 in the category of Upcoming Television Broadcasters. Her book The Patient Assassin won the 2020 Hessell-Tiltman Prize.

== Personal life ==
Anand married science writer Simon Singh in 2007. The couple have two sons and live in Richmond, London.

Anand is a patron of the Richmond Society and of the Museum of Richmond.
