= Thuggee (book) =

2007 book published by Kim A. Wagner

Thuggee: Banditry and the British in early nineteenth-century India
- Author: Kim A. Wagner
- Subjects: History; South Asian history; Humanities
- Published: 2007
- Publisher: Palgrave Macmillan
- Publication place: UK
- ISBN: 978-0-230-59020-5

Thuggee: Banditry and the British in early nineteenth-century India (2007), is a book authored by Kim A. Wagner and published by Palgrave Macmillan, which was short-listed for the History Today Book of the Year Award in 2008.
