= Gary Sheffield (historian) =

English academic

Gary D. Sheffield is an English academic and military historian. He publishes on the conduct of British Army operations in World War I, and contributes to print and broadcast media on the subject.

== Career ==
Sheffield is a proponent of the "revisionist school" of thought with regard to the conduct of military operations on the Western Front by the British Army during the First World War.

In 2001 he published a First World War revisionist book, Forgotten Victory: The First World War, Myths & Realities. The British literary academic Frank McLynn, in a book review in The Independent, said Sheffield was a "single-minded Right-wing ideologist" who had "tied himself in illogical knots" to "rescue (Douglas) Haig from the justifiable charge of being an incompetent butcher" and "launder" his reputation in an "eccentric and cocksure work" that was "an insult to the memory of the soldiers who had died in droves under his command on the Western Front." In a book review in The Guardian, historian David Horspool says Sheffield "sets out the arguments for an interpretation not exclusively based on the war poets, Alan Clark and Blackadder" in his compassionate, clearly argued book". David Filsell, reviewing it for the Western Front Association in 2002, said "That it has been a great publishing success - with a paperback edition imminent - should be cause for particular pleasure for all that have taken study beyond the bigoted blatherings of the Butchers and Bunglers nursery school", and says that it is "amongst the most important books to have been published on the Great War for some years. Whether it will change public opinion is another matter, but when (in the distant future) the ruler of history - and not weight of emotion - measures the Great War, I feel sure that Gary Sheffield's views will be firmly amongst those which predominate".

In 2011 he published his second book on Field Marshal the Earl Douglas Haig, The Chief: Douglas Haig and the British Army (Aurum Press, 2011). Reviewing the book in The Daily Telegraph the historian Nigel Jones commented on its 'solid scholarship and admirable advocacy', yet added that (with reference to Sheffield's thesis that the extremely high casualties of the British Army can be partly explained by Haig's understandable lack of experience in such matters in the years 1914 to 1917): 'the nagging thought remains: what a terrible shame it was that Haig's progress along his learning curve had to be greased by such deep floods of blood.'

In 2013 he was appointed professor of War Studies at the University of Wolverhampton. Sheffield is a member of the Advisory Board of the Journal of the Royal United Service Institution, Visiting Professor at the Humanities Research Institute of the University of Buckingham, member of the academic Advisory Panel of the National Army Museum and a member of the Academic Advisory Board of the Soldiers of Oxfordshire Trust. He became the Honorary President of The Western Front Association in 2019.

== Honors ==
- Named a Society for Army Historical Research Fellow, 2023

== Publications ==
- The Redcaps: History of the Royal Military Police and Its Antecedents from the Middle Ages to the Gulf War (Brassey's, 1994) ISBN 978-1-85753-029-2
- Ed., Leadership and Command: The Anglo-American Military Experience Since 1861 (Brassey's, 1996; New Edition, 2002)
- 'Leadership in the Trenches: Officer-Man Relations, Morale and Discipline in the British Army in the era of the First World War (Macmillan, 2000)
- Forgotten Victory: The First World War - Myths and Realities (Headline, 2001; Review, 2002)
- Ed. with D. Todman, Command and Control on the Western Front: The British Army's Experience, 1914–19 (Spellmount, 2004) ISBN 978-1-86227-083-1
- The Somme: A New History (Cassell Military Paperbacks, 2004)
- Ed. with J. Bourne, Douglas Haig: War Diaries and Letters 1914–1918 (Weidenfeld & Nicolson, 2005; Phoenix, 2006)
- Ed., War on the Western Front: In the Trenches of World War I (Osprey, 2007)
- Imperial War Museum's 1914–1918 The Western Front Experience (Carlton Books, 2008)
- The War Studies Reader: From the Seventeenth century to the Present Day & Beyond (Continuum, 2010)
- The Chief: Douglas Haig and the British Army (Aurum Press, 2011. ISBN 978-1845136918).
- Ed. with Peter W. Gray, Changing War (Continuum, 2013)
- Sheffield, Gary (2013). The First World War in 100 Objects [La première Guerre mondiale en 100 objets: Ces objets qui ont écrit l'histoire de la grande guerre] (in French). Translated by CILLERO & DE MOTTA SL, of ZARAGOZA. Paris: Elcy. ISBN 978-2-753-20832-2.
- Command and Morale: The British Army on the Western Front 1914–18 (Praetorian Press, 2014).
- A Short History of the First World War (Oneworld Publications, 2014).
- Douglas Haig: From Somme to Victory (Aurum Press, 2016).
- Wellington (Pocket Giants series) (The History Press, 2017).
