= Katcha dacoits =

Criminal gangs active in the riverine belt of Sindh and Punjab, Pakistan

Katcha dacoits کچے کے ڈکیت
- Founded: 1950–1960 (presumed to have originated from the local feudalism)
- Territory: active in below 6 districts of Sindh and Punjab : 1. Ghotki (Sindh); 2. Kashmore (Sindh); 3. Shikarpur (Sindh); 4. Sukkur (Sindh); 5. Rahim Yar Khan (Punjab); 6. Rajanpur (Punjab)
- Membership: More than 20,000 combined members
- Activities: Kidnapping, extortion, murder, dacoity, banditry, smuggling, arms trafficking, highway robberies and illegitimate businesses
- Notable members: Principal gangs: 1. Chotu gang 2. Nazroo gang 3. Ladi gang

The Katcha dacoits (/ˈkætʃə/, Urdu: کچے کے ڈاکو, IPA: [kət͡ʃɛː kɛː ɖaːkuː]) are criminal gangs operating in the riverine areas of Sindh and Punjab, Pakistan. Infamous for their violent deeds, including kidnapping, extortion, dacoity and murder, they have expanded their illegal activities and often deceive and abduct individuals under the guise of romantic or business relations.

Despite multiple large-scale operations against them, these gangs persist in the northern districts of Sindh and Rahim Yar Khan District of Punjab, presenting a significant challenge to local authorities. Armed with sophisticated weaponry, surpassing that of local law enforcement, they have targeted numerous civilians, instilling fear within the local populace and consolidating their influence.

== Criminal activities ==
The Katcha bandits are infamous for their ruthless tactics, including the abduction of civilians and security personnel, often recording acts of physical violence to demand hefty ransoms in the millions of rupees. If these demands are not met, hostages are often subjected to brutal killings. Their criminal activities have evolved beyond mere banditry, encompassing a range of illegal enterprises. They are also known to engage in deception, by feigning romantic or business interests to deceive unsuspecting individuals.

One such notorious figure is Ghotki bandit Faqir Nisar Shar, who frequently uses Facebook to issue threats against the police while advocating for his Shar community and fellow dacoits. Shar is considered the spokesperson for these criminal elements. Furthermore, these gangs have adopted social media as a platform for their operations, showcasing weaponry alongside Sindhi and Saraiki songs in videos shared online.

Despite numerous large-scale operations targeting them, bandits persist in their criminal activities within the northern districts. According to a fact-finding report by the HRCP, bandits extort an annual ransom of approximately one billion rupees, with 300 individuals kidnapped for ransom in 2022 alone.

== Kacha Region ==
The Forest Department oversees millions of acres of land in the Kacha region, situated on both banks of the Indus River. A significant portion of this land is currently under occupation, as reported by the department. The area encompasses vast expanses of uncultivated land known locally as "Katie," owned by numerous large landholders, many of whom are also prominent figures in politics. The Kacha region experiences arid conditions for the majority of the year but faces annual inundation during flood season. Despite this, the land is highly prized for its fertility, owing to the deposition of minerals carried by the river.

According to estimates from the Sindh Disaster Management Department, the population of this area exceeds one million, predominantly engaged in livestock rearing and agriculture. The region is delineated by Kashmore district on one side of the river and Ghotki district on the other. Although the Kacha area spans multiple districts in central and northern Sindh, it is particularly noted for its prevalence of banditry and tribal conflicts in districts such as Kashmore, Ghotki, Shikarpur, and Jacobabad. The presence of dense forests, shrubbery, and rugged terrain provides cover for illicit activities, facilitating robberies and serving as a haven for criminals seeking refuge.

== Weaponry ==
The bandits are reportedly armed with sophisticated weapons including mortars, rocket-propelled grenades (RPGs) and anti-aircraft guns. Their weapons are said to be superior to local police, posing a significant challenge to law enforcement agencies.

== Law Enforcement Operations ==
Operation Shikarpur
Date	26 May 2021 – present
Location	Shikarpur, Sukkur, Ghotki, and Katcha region of North Sindh
Result	Ongoing

Belligerents
Sindh: Sindh Police	Sindh Dacoits

Commanders and leaders
Sindh; Chief Minister: Syed Murad Ali Shah (2018–present); IG Sindh: Mushtaq Ahmad Mahar (2020)	Tegho Khan Teghani (alleged)

Units involved
Local Police ATS Commandos	Local Tribal Dacoits

Strength
600 Local Police 200 ATS Commandos	700 - 1000

Casualties and losses
4 Policemen, 1 Photographer killed 6 Injured 1 APC damaged	

=== Operation Shikarpur ===
Operation Shikarpur (Urdu: آپریشن شکارپور) is an ongoing law enforcement initiative aimed at combating local criminals in the Sindh province of Pakistan, particularly focusing on the Kacha area in Shikarpur District. The operation's objective is to apprehend robbers and other lawbreakers, thereby ensuring a safer environment for the local populace.

To facilitate uninterrupted action against criminals, the police have requested temporary evacuation of mosques in the area. This measure aims to prevent any interference with the operation, which is also being conducted in Sukkur and Kashmore districts of North Sindh. Tragically, during a confrontation with robbers, two policemen and a police assistant lost their lives when their armored vehicle was subjected to heavy weapons fire.

In a significant development, the police arrested Tegho Khan Teghani, a prominent figure from the Teghani tribe, in Karachi, subsequently remanding him into police custody. SSP Shikarpur, Tanveer Tanio, emphasized the necessity of cooperation from residents, especially due to displacement following floods in the Kacha region. Those found remaining in the area and engaging in hostile acts towards the police would be considered accomplices or partners of criminals.

The decision to initiate the operation in the Kacha area followed an attack on a police party, resulting in three fatalities, including two policemen. SSP Shikarpur highlighted prevalent crimes in the district, including abductions along national highways and cattle theft within the Kacha region. Utilizing information from arrested individuals, the police are tracking down gangs responsible for ransom kidnappings.

To enhance operational effectiveness, police outposts have been established in vulnerable areas like Garhi Tegho and Chak, with base camps set up to provide immediate response capabilities. State-of-the-art armored vehicles resistant to heavy weapons and drone cameras for monitoring criminal movements have been deployed, with snipers on standby. The operation will progress further after establishing base camps and gaining control over challenging terrain.

SSP Sukkur, stated that over 25 outposts had been set up in Kacha, with access near the Indus River to prevent accused individuals from fleeing Shikarpur. Strict measures have been implemented to halt supply routes, with monitoring of white-clad accomplices of robbers in urban areas. In Kashmore district, SSP reported ongoing operations targeting dacoit hideouts, with daily advances and exchanges of fire. Challenges such as forested areas and bushes obstructing progress are being addressed, with monitoring extended to the Kacha area adjacent to Shikarpur.

=== Kacha Operation ===
Kacha Operation
Location	Kacha, Rahim Yar Khan District
Result	Ongoing

Commanders and leaders
- IG Punjab

Casualties and losses
2 police officers killed, several injured	3 militants killed, 6 arrested

The ongoing Kacha Operation, conducted by Pakistani police and security forces in Sadiqabad, Punjab, aims to eradicate bandits safe havens and restore peace. Initiated in response to a deadly attack by a gang at Chowk Mahi in October 2021, which resulted in the loss of nine lives due to indiscriminate shooting, the operation seeks to ensure the safety and security of the region's residents.

Inspector General of Police, Dr. Usman Anwar, provided a comprehensive briefing to the Provincial Cabinet of Punjab regarding the ongoing operation in the Kacha region. The cabinet granted clearance for the release of funds to support the expenses associated with the operation. Additionally, a comprehensive plan has been devised for the construction of essential infrastructure following the culmination of the Kacha campaign against terrorists. The cabinet reaffirmed its commitment to seeing the operation through to its successful conclusion and commended the bravery and dedication of the participating police forces.

Supporting the efforts of the Pakistani police and security forces, the Elite Force has played a crucial role in overseeing the operation in the Kacha area along the Indus River, targeting alleged criminal hideouts.

Tragically, the operation has resulted in two police fatalities and several injuries. In response to the escalating situation, the police and provincial government sought deployment of the Pakistan Army, which was subsequently approved by the cabinet. The army is now actively involved in the operation, deploying sniper squads and armored personnel carrier (APC) teams to provide additional support to the police forces on the ground.

== Challenges and countermeasures ==
Bandits continue to be a major challenge for local authorities, despite several crackdowns against them. Their activities have instilled fear in the local population, and their influence seems to be growing. The government has been criticized for failing to deal effectively with the threat.

The Sindh government is actively working to stop the activities of these dacoits. In April 2024, however, the former interior minister of Sindh says that unless action is taken against the landlords in the Kacha area, the dacoits will not be eradicated.

In April 2024, the Federal Ministry of Interior, under the leadership of Federal Interior Minister Mohsin Naqvi, decided to conduct a joint operation in the Kacha area after detailed consultations and deliberations to strengthen security measures across Pakistan and deal with criminal elements. This decision was taken during a high-level meeting of the National Action Plan implementation review committee. Advanced technology, including drones, will be used to increase operational efficiency.

== See also ==
- Crime in Pakistan
