= Mukta Gupta =

Retired Judge of Delhi High Court

Hon'ble Ms. Justice (Retd.) Mukta Gupta

Judge of Delhi High Court
- In office 23 October 2009 – 27 June 2023
- Nominated by: K. G. Balakrishnan
- Appointed by: Pratibha Patil

Personal details
- Born: 28 June 1961 (age 65)
- Education: University of Delhi

Mukta Gupta (born 28 June 1961) is a former judge of the Delhi High Court in India, and a former public prosecutor for the Government of the National Capital Territory of Delhi. As a public prosecutor, she prosecuted a number of notable cases, including those relating to the 2001 attack on the Indian Parliament, and the 2000 terrorist attack on Red Fort in Delhi, as well as the murders of Jessica Lal and Naina Sahni.

== Education ==
Gupta was educated at the Montfort Senior Secondary School in Delhi, and obtained a B.Sc. from Hindu College, Delhi in 1980. She then studied Law at the Faculty of Law, University of Delhi.

== Career ==
Gupta enrolled with the Delhi Bar Council in 1984 and practiced law in Delhi before being appointed a public prosecutor.

=== Public Prosecutor ===
As a government counsel, Gupta prosecuted a number of notable criminal cases, including the murder of Jessica Lal, the murder of Naina Sahni, the murder of Nitish Katara, the criminal cases relating to the 2001 attack on the Indian Parliament, and the 2000 terrorist attack on Red Fort in Delhi.

Gupta also represented the Central Bureau of Investigation in a number of significant cases, including the murders of Priyadarshini Mattoo and Madhumita Sharma, and the case concerning the leaking of intelligence from the Indian Naval War Room.

=== Judiciary ===
Gupta was appointed an additional judge of the Delhi High Court in 2009 and was appointed a permanent judge in 2014.

As a judge she has adjudicated a number of politically significant cases, including a case against television presenter Arnab Goswami for defaming Congress leader Shashi Tharoor, and in a case concerning the conviction of a Pakistani national for conspiring to commit terrorism in India. In October 2020, Gupta declined to grant relief to the secretary of the Indian Supreme Court Bar Association after he was suspended. The suspension had been instituted after he attempted to interfere with a resolution passed by the Association, criticizing former Supreme Court judge Arun Mishra for violating judicial protocol and praising the Prime Minister in a public speech.

In 2019, Gupta was appointed a special judge in a special court constituted under the Unlawful Activities (Prevention) Act 1967, to examine whether the Students Islamic Movement of India (SIMI) should be declared as an unlawful association under that act.

Gupta has adjudicated in several cases concerning the freedom of speech and expression in India. In 2012, Gupta refused to allow a plea for the withdrawing of an Army press release alleging bribery by a retired army officer, noting that Indian law, in her opinion, did not enforce the 'right to reputation' as a fundamental right. In July 2020, she directed Google, Facebook, and Twitter to remove posts containing allegations of criminal conduct against a civil servant by a woman, while the case concerning these allegations was ongoing.

In April 2020, Gupta directed the All India Institute of Medical Sciences, New Delhi, to provide medical treatment to a woman who had been denied access to health care after disclosing that she had tested as HIV-positive.
