= Chambal Ke Daku =

1982 Hindi film

Chambal Ke Daku is a 1982 Hindi-language action drama film directed by S. Azhar and produced by R. Sandhu. Two real life dacoits of Chambal, Mohar Singh and Madho Singh starred in this film. It is the first movie in India where two criminals have portrayed their own characters on celluloid.

== Cast ==
- Javed Khan
- Madhu Malini
- Nazneen
- Hina Kausar
- Birbal
- Ramesh Deo
- Mohar Singh
- Madho Singh

== Soundtrack ==
All songs were composed by B. T. Singh and Gauhar Kanpuri, except the song "Mujhe Mora Jobanwa". It was written by Reshab Jain.

- "Asha Ka Sooraj Dooba Hain" - Asha Bhosle
- "Ram Kasam Yeh Jawaani" - Asha Bhosle
- "Are Hardam Kam Zaroori" - Asha Bhosle, Javed Khan
- "Uljhan Ho, Chahe Koi Aa Jaaye Mushkil" - Mohammed Rafi, Asha Bhosle, Manna Dey
- "Mujhe Mora Jobanwa" - Vijayta Pandit, Dilraj Kaur
- "Koi Aamewala Hain" - Usha Mangeshkar
