= Seema Parihar =

Indian politician and former bandit

- Born: 1 January 1970 (age 56); Auraiya, Uttar Pradesh, India
- Occupations: Dacoit (Bandit), Politician
- Spouse: Nirbhay Singh Gujjar Lala Ram

Seema Parihar is an Indian politician and former bandit. She was a member of the Samajwadi Party. Parihar claims that her inspiration is Phoolan Devi, who was known as the Bandit Queen, and had also been a bandit before becoming a politician. She was a contestant in Bigg Boss in 2010.

== Biography ==
Seema Parihar was born in Auraiya in Uttar Pradesh, India in a poor family. She was kidnapped in 1983, at the age of 13 from her village of Bawine in Uttar Pradesh by dacoits Lala Ram and Kusuma Nian, and became a dacoit herself. In 1986, she married dacoit Nirbhay Singh Gujjar, but later returned to Lala Ram. Parihar became the leader of her gang, and engaged in looting, kidnapping and murder in the regions surrounding Bihand jungle and Chambal River. During her career, she killed 70 people, kidnapped 200 people and looted 30 houses. In June 2000, after 18 years of dacoity, she surrendered to Uttar Pradesh police. She was jailed, facing 29 charges, including 8 counts of murder and half a dozen of kidnapping. In August 2001, she said that she had received offers from political parties.

In the 2002 Uttar Pradesh Legislative Assembly election, Parihar supported Shiv Sena. In November 2006, she joined the Indian Justice Party, and ran as its candidate for the Mirzapur-Bhadohi Lok Sabha by-election in 2007.

In January 2008, she moved to the Lok Janshakti Party, and in October that year, switched to the Samajwadi Party. As of October 2008, she had been acquitted of 15 of the criminal cases against her, and was on bail for the remaining 14 cases.

In 2011, Seema Parihar was appointed the head of the women's wing of the National Corruption Eradication Council, an anti-corruption organisation.

== Popular culture ==
Seema Parihar played in the film Wounded - The Bandit Queen. This film is the first instance of Hindi cinema where a "bandit queen" played out her own real life story on screen. Shot on location in the Chambal Valley, the film was released in 2006. The film went on to win the Critics Award at the Leicester Expo Bollywood film festival (United Kingdom) in 2005. In 2010 Seema Parihar also participated in season 4 of the Indian reality TV show Bigg Boss. This show aired on Colors from 3 October 2010 and Parihar was evicted on day 76 (week 11) from the house. Before participating in Bigg Boss, Seema Parihar was in jail and filed a petition in Allahabad High Court seeking permission to appear in the program. Allahabad High Court initially rejected her plea to appear.

== See also ==
- Jagga Jatt
- Paan Singh Tomar
- Phoolan Devi
- Veerappan
