= Daylight Robbery =

Daylight Robbery may refer to:

- Daylight Robbery (1986 film), a 1986 British television film by Rose Tremain in the anthology series ScreenPlay
- Daylight Robbery (TV series), a 1999 British TV mini-series starring Michelle Collins
- Daylight Robbery (1964 film), a 1964 film directed by Michael Truman
- Daylight Robbery (2008 film), a 2008 British film, directed by Paris Leonti
- Daylight Robbery (novel), a 1980 novel by Surender Mohan Pathak
- "Daylight Robbery", a song by Imogen Heap from the 2005 album Speak for Yourself
