= Phoolan (film) =

2026 Indian biographical film

- Directed by: Richie Mehta
- Screenplay by: Richie Mehta; Anu Singh
- Based on: I, Phoolan - The Autobiography of India's Bandit Queen by Phoolan Devi
- Produced by: Shareen Mantri Kedia; Kanwal Kohli; Kishor Arora; Richie Mehta
- Starring: Sneha Kumari; Anurag Thakur; Vikram Pratap Singh; Aakash Dahiya; Prateek Pachouri; Devdutt Banodiya
- Cinematography: Pip White
- Edited by: Beverley Mills
- Music by: Andrew Lockington
- Production companies: Namah Pictures; Amazon MGM Studios
- Distributed by: Prime Video
- Release date: 16 September 2026 (TIFF)
- Running time: 112 minutes
- Country: India
- Language: Hindi

Phoolan is a 2026 Indian Hindi-language biographical drama film co-written and directed by Richie Mehta. The film set in a village in Uttar Pradesh, India, depicts intriguing 48 hours in the life of the most famous female dacoit in the history of India, Phoolan Devi. Based on I, Phoolan - The Autobiography of India's Bandit Queen by Phoolan Devi, and produced by Amazon MGM Studios it is an original Prime Video film.

The film had its world premiere in Special Presentations at the 2026 Toronto International Film Festival on 16 September 2026.

== Cast ==
- Sneha Kumari
- Anurag Thakur
- Vikram Pratap Singh
- Aakash Dahiya
- Prateek Pachouri
- Devdutt Banodiya

== Production ==
In March 2026, Prime Video India unveiled 54 new series and films at its "Prime Video Presents" showcase, which included Phoolan. The film, written and directed by Richie Mehta, depicts a dramatic story from Phoolan Devi's life. It focuses on a tense 48-hour standoff in the Chambal region, where she was surrounded by thousands of armed men.

The film is produced by Shareen Mantri Kedia, Kishor Arora, Kanwal Kohli and Richie Mehta. It stars Sneha Kumari as Phoolan Devi, with Anurag Thakur, Aakash Dahiya, Vikram Pratap Singh, Prateek Pachori and Dev Dutt Budholiya playing key roles.

== Release ==
Phoolan had its world premiere in Special Presentations at the 2026 Toronto International Film Festival on 16 September 2026.
