= Mohar Singh (dacoit) =

Indian dacoit

Mohar Singh Gurjar
- Born: 1926 or 1927; Madhya Pradesh, India
- Died: 5 May 2020; Mehgaon, Madhya Pradesh, India
- Citizenship: Indian
- Occupations: Dacoit, politician
- Years active: 1955–1972
- Organization: Mohar Singh gang
- Known for: Dacoity in the Chambal region
- Notable work: Chambal Ke Daku

Details
- Victims: At least 200 (claimed by Singh)
- Country: India
- States: Madhya Pradesh, Uttar Pradesh, Rajasthan
- Location: Chambal region
- Date apprehended: 1972
- Imprisoned at: 8 years

Mohar Singh Gurjar (1926 or 1927 – May 5, 2020) was a former dacoit bandit turned political leader. He was one of the most dreaded dacoits of the Chambal valley in the 1960s. Singh had 600 cases against him, of which 400 were murder cases. Singh had claimed that his gang had killed at least 200 people.

He was regarded by poor villagers as a Robin Hood figure. He referred to himself as a baaghi (rebel) rather than a dacoit and attributed his turn to crime to social conditions.

== Criminal career and life ==
Mohar Singh was born in 1926 or 1927. He had become a dacoit after murdering a man over a property dispute in the year 1955. Mohar Singh carried a reward of 12 Lakh rupees now about 1.5crores on his head in the late 1960s and '70s. He surrendered in front of Jayaprakash Narayan in 1972 along with his gang of over 150 dacoits.

At the time of his surrender, as part of the negotiation, he was promised that he would not be given a death sentence and was kept in an open prison. He was given agricultural land by the government as a means of livelihood.

== Politics ==
After serving eight years in prison Mohar Singh was released in 1980 and entered into local politics. He was elected unopposed in a local body election in 1995. He was elected to Mehgaon municipality and served as a councilor for two terms in the 1990s. He was associated with Indian National Congress, he later supported Bharatiya Janata Party in Madhya Pradesh.

In September 2019, Singh had written a letter to the prime minister Narendra Modi for the restoration of the Bateswara temple, a historic structure, which was constructed by the Gurjara-Pratiharas.

== Death ==
He died on 5 May 2020 at the age of 92. He was survived by his two sons and a daughter.

== In popular culture ==
Mohar Singh starred in a 1982 Hindi film named, Chambal Ke Daku, which marketed with the tagline: 'first time real dacoits on-screen'.

In May 2006, it was reported that a film named Pakad was being made, featuring three dacoits Malkhan Singh, Man Singh and Mohar Singh and the story was reported to be written by M. C. Dwivedi, former chief of police of Uttar Pradesh.

== See also ==
- Chambal Ke Daku
