= Gauḍa (region) =

Territory located in Bengal in ancient and medieval time

Gauda (Bengali: গৌড় Gauṛ), was a territory located in Bengal in ancient and medieval times, as part of the Gauda Kingdom.

== Location and extent ==
The Arthashastra of Chanakya (around 350–283 BC) refers to it along with Vanga, Pundra. This geographical idea continues with some of the ancient texts. Gauda and Vanga are sometimes used side by side. In the Sanskrit text Manasollasa (1129 CE), the name Gauda-Vangala was used to denote the whole of Bengal region.

Shashanka, the first important king of ancient Bengal who is believed to have ruled between 590 AD to 625 AD, had his capital at Karnasubarna, 9.6 kilometres (6.0 mi) south-west of Baharampur, headquarters of Murshidabad district. The Chinese monk, Xuanzang (Hiuen Tsang) travelled from the country of Karnasubarna to a region in Orissa ruled by Shashanka. There is mention of Pundravardhana being part of Gauda in certain ancient records.

Evidence seems to be discrepant regarding links of Gauda with the Rarh region. While Krishna Mishra (eleventh or twelfth century AD), in his Prabodha-chandrodaya, mentions that Gauda rashtra includes Rarh (or Rarhpuri) and Bhurishreshthika, identified with Bhurshut, in Hooghly and Howrah districts, but the Managoli inscription of the Yadava king Jaitugi I distinguishes Lala (Rarh) from Gaula (Gauda).

The Pala emperors were referred to as Vangapati (Lord of Vanga) and Gaudesvara (Lord of Gauda). Sena kings also called themselves Gaudesvara. From then Gauda and Vanga seem to be interchangeable names for the whole of Bengal.

According to Jain writers of the thirteenth and fourteenth centuries, Gauda included Lakshmanavati in present-day Malda district.

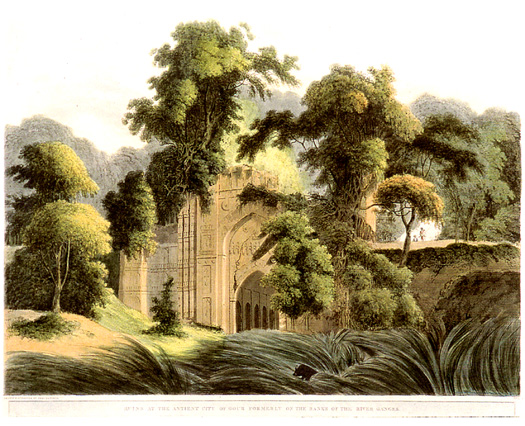
Early 19th century lithograph of the Muslim ruins of Dakhil Darwaza at Gaur, West Bengal.

In the early Muslim period the name Gauda came to be applied to Lakhanavati in Malda district. In the narrower sense Gauda is the territory between the river Padma and Bardhamana region.

== City of Gauda ==
Gauda or Gaur, as it is spelled mostly in modern times, refers to Lakhnauti the ruined city located on the India-Bangladesh border. Most of the former citadel is located in present-day the Malda district of West Bengal, India, while a smaller part is located in Chapainawabganj District of Bangladesh. This city was on the east bank of the Ganges river, 40 kilometers (25 mi) downstream from Rajmahal. However, the current course of the Ganges is far away from the ruins.
