= Chandra Shekhar Prasad Singh =

Indian judge (killed 1982)

Justice Chandra Shekhar Prasad Singh Raja

Judge, Allahabad High Court
- In office 20 October 1970 – 20 March 1982

Personal details
- Died: Manda
- Spouse: Rani Rajeshwari Singh Rani Padma Devi
- Children: Raja Vikram Singh Rani Sudha Singh Rani Sunita Singh Rani Sandhya Singh Geeta Singh Rajkumar Ajit Singh
- Education: University of Allahabad
- Profession: Judge

Chandra Shekhar Prasad Singh also known as C.S.P.Singh was a judge of the Allahabad High Court. He was the elder brother of later Prime Minister V. P. Singh. He was the titular head of the Daiya zamindari and had the title of Raja. He was murdered along with his 15-year-old son during an evening drive by Dacoits in revenge for the anti-Dacoit operations launched by the then Chief Minister of Uttar Pradesh V. P. Singh. Only his youngest son Vikram Singh escaped death along with three other people including the heir to Shankargarh. V. P. Singh said that obviously his brother "paid the price of my office". Many believed that CSP Singh's assassination was the reason for V.P. Singh's resignation as chief minister.
