= Mawal =

Mawal could refer to

- Mawwal, a traditional genre of vocal Arabic music
- Mawal, a region in Maharashtra, India
  - Mawala, the soldiers from the Mawal region who served in Shivaji's army
  - Maval (Vidhan Sabha constituency)
  - Maval (Lok Sabha constituency)

== See also ==
- Mawali (novel), crime fiction novel by Indian writer Surender Mohan Pathak
