= Salem Nanjundaiah Subba Rao =

Indian activist (1929–2021)

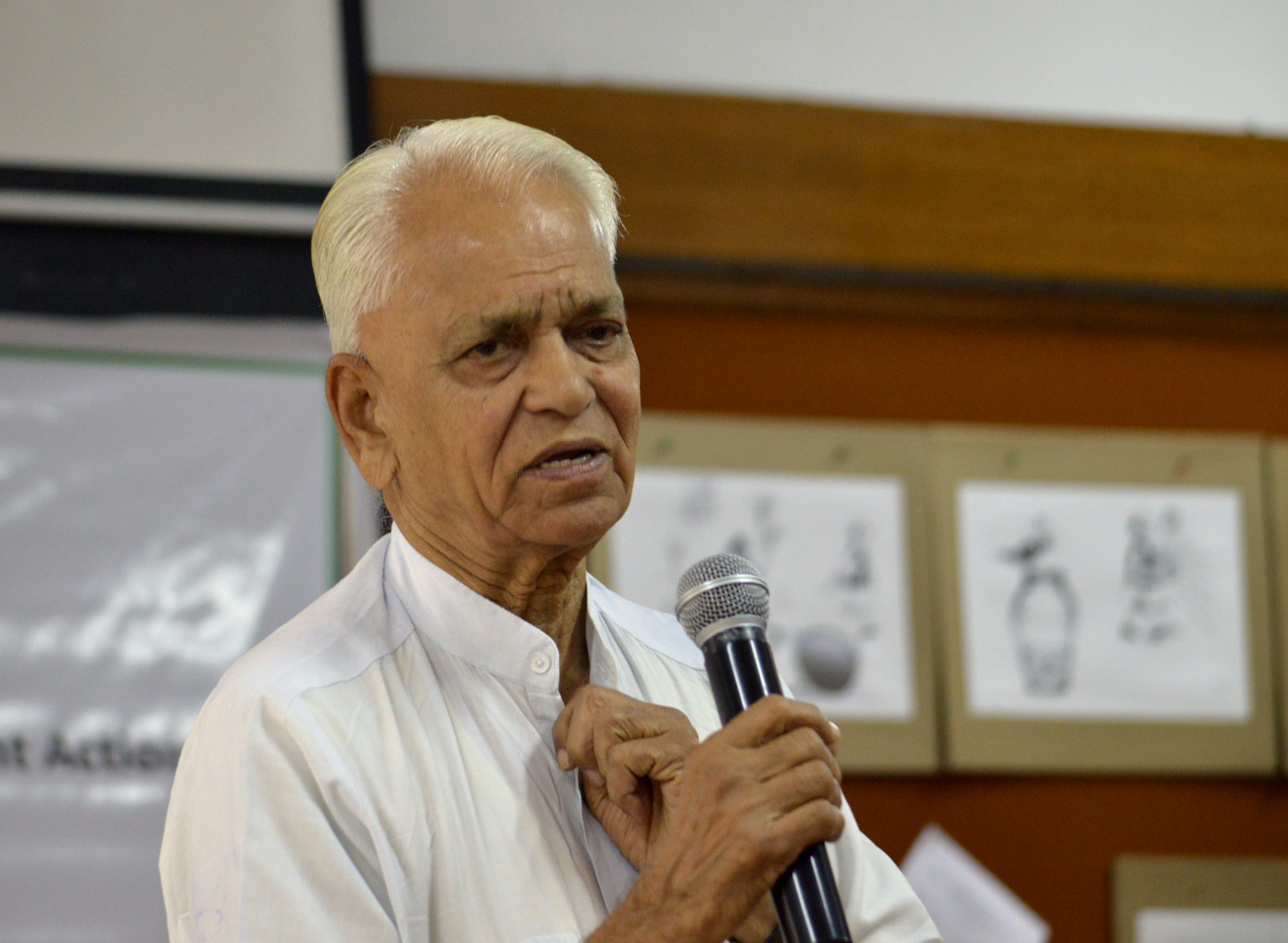
- Born: 7 February 1929; Bangalore, Karnataka
- Died: 27 October 2021 (aged 92); Jaipur, Rajasthan
- Other name: Bhai Ji
- Occupation: Social worker
- Known for: surrender of dacoits

S. N. Subba Rao (7 February 1929 – 27 October 2021) was a fellow of the Gandhi Peace Foundation and founder of National Youth Project.

Rao died from COVID-19 during the COVID-19 pandemic in India.

== Early life ==
Salem Nanjundaiah Subba Rao was born in Bangalore, Karnataka, on 7 February 1929. He attended the Ramakrishna Vedanta College in Malleshwaram.

He was arrested when aged 13 for daubing slogans in support of the Quit India movement.

== Activism ==
In 1969, he became director of the "Gandhi Darshan Train", which toured the country for a year with materials relating to celebrations of the birth centenary of Gandhi.

Subba Rao set up the Mahatma Gandhi Sewa Ashram in the [Joura, District- Morena,[Chambal Division|Chambal]] valley of the Indian state of Madhya Pradesh to rehabilitate dacoits that infested the region. By his calculations, as many as 654 dacoits, many of them contemporaries of Man Singh, surrendered to him between 1960 and 1976.

== Awards and honours ==
- National Youth Award to National Youth Project- 1995
- D.Lit. Honoured Degree by Kashi Vidhya Peeth- 1995
- Bhartiya Ekta Puruskar
- Vishva Manvadhikar Protsahan Puruskar-2002
- Rajiv Gandhi National Sadbhavana Award-2003
- Rashtirya Sampradayik Sadbhavna Puruskar-2003
- Jamanalal Bajaj Puraskar-2006
- Mahatma Gandhi Purskar-2008
- Anuvart Ahimsa Award-2010
- Life Time Achievement Award-2014 by Bharitya Sathi Sangthan Delhi
- Mahatma Gandhi Prerna Seva Puraskar-2014 by Karnataka Government
- Rashtriya Sadbhawna Ekta Prusaskar-2014 Nagpur, Maharashtra
