= Mohar Singh =

Mohar Singh may refer to:

- Chaudhary Mohar Singh, revolutionary in the Indian Rebellion of 1857
- Mohar Singh (dacoit), dacoit of the Chambal valley in the 1960s
- Mohar Singh Rathore, Indian politician from the state of Rajasthan
