= Mawali (novel) =

1995 novel by Surender Mohan Pathak

- First edition cover
- Author: Surender Mohan Pathak
- Language: Hindi
- Genre: crime fiction
- Publisher: Ravi Pocket Books
- Publication date: 1995
- Publication place: India
- Media type: Print (Paperback)
- Pages: 430

Mawali (मवाली) is a Hindi language novel by Surender Mohan Pathak. It is based upon the biography of a fictional personality called Shyamrav Pethekar, better known as Sikander. The novel is set in Ahmedabad and draws an excellent and realistic portrait of Gujarat underworld, that is unknown in Hindi fiction.

There are actually two novels of same name.

== Plot ==
In the first version the story starts with Sikander planning to take revenge on a guy called Ratan Shah, who has cheated and killed Sikander's friend Kundan Seth. The trio of Rattan Shah, Kundan Seth and another fellow called Latif Katta kidnapped a rich businessman's nine-year-old daughter for Rs 40 Lakh. The plan was not to kill her but Ratan Shah turned traitor, he killed not only the girl but also Latif Katta and had poor Seth framed for both the murders, with help of a semi-callgirl Rupali, a police inspector called Gokhle and the management and staff of Hotel Surya.(Later instead of killing Rupali Sikander will force her to become his keep, along with her two sisters Malti and Kanchan, and at the end the three sisters will play a vital role in bringing down the Sikander by helping his arch-enemy Chhota Dalvi.)

One by one Sikander kills all. As almost all were part of Ahmedabad underworld, the underworld is shaken to its foundations and the ruthless Sikander, whose main area was only Lal Darwaza, becomes more and more powerful as he becomes the monopolist of bootlegging in the city. Bootlegging makes Sikander, who was born in a slum in Surat, a rich man living in a luxury flat. Then one day he makes a mistake, he tells Rupali the story of Samson and Delilah, and also tells her that just like Samson's hair, his weak point is his .38 revolver, a gift from his guru, a ruthless gangster called Commander, who brought up and trained him. One day Rupali vanishes with the gun and all the money. Sikander almost goes mad. He was so attached to his .38 that without it he feels as weak and vulnerable as a baby. His enemies, mainly Chhota Dalvi who is actually behind all mischief Rupali is doing, take advantage of this situation and one by one Sikander starts losing his assets. The government is also trying to trap him just like they trapped Tony Montana in Scarface - by income tax strategy. But Sikander has a simple solution to that - blow up the Income Tax Officer with a bomb ! When the underworld hears that Sikander is planning to blow up an IAS, they strongly suggest him not to do that. A grand meeting is held where all big dons of Gujarat including Firangi, Tony Masalamix and Vijaysingh (based on character of Vijay Mallya) are present to talk to Sikander just like the five "families" do in end of The Godfather, but Sikander has nor level-headedness nor maturity of Don Corleone - he childishly threatens to kill them all by singing a song ...machinegun uthaaya sabko udaaya... as he loses his temper when they question him about the disappearance of one of his subordinates. This way Sikander signs his own death warrant. In the end his own, most trusted lieutenants kill him (under instruction and pressure of the syndicate's general consensus) .

== Tandoor scandal ==
Sikander has an innovative solution when it comes to disposal of dead bodies of all people he kills. He has contacts with a fellow called Vinaayakrav Tambe who runs a foundry, and he lets Sikander use it to make corpses vanish without leaving a trace. A famous murder occurred in Delhi which according to BBC "shook all country". More sensational than murder itself (which was in fact an honour killing) was the attempt to dispose the body. The murderer had a contact with a restaurant owner, which had a Tandoor (a clay oven used in India). After his apprehension the guilty told the police that he got the idea from this novel.
