= Sher Singh Rana =

Indian politician (born 1976)

- Born: Pankaj Singh Pundir; 17 May 1976 (age 50); Roorkee, Uttarakhand
- Other name: S. Rana
- Occupation: Politician
- Organization: Rashtravadi Janlok Party (R.J.P)
- Spouse: Pratima Singh
- Criminal charges: Murder; 223 (escape from confinement), 224 (resistance to lawful apprehension of another), 419 (personation), 420 (dishonestly inducing delivery of property) and 467 (forgery) of the IPC

Details
- Victims: Phoolan Devi
- Killed: 1
- Weapon: Pistol

Pankaj Singh Pundir (born 17 May 1976), popularly known as Sher Singh Rana or S. Rana, is an Indian politician who was convicted for the 2001 assassination of Indian politician and former bandit Phoolan Devi. In August 2014, Rana was sentenced to life imprisonment and a fine of ₹100,000 (approximately US$1,600) for Devi's assassination, as well as charges of conspiracy, after a 10-year trial. He was released from jail in 2016 after the court granted him bail.

== Early life ==
Sher Singh Rana was born as Pankaj Singh Pundir in a Hindu Rajput family in Roorkee, Uttarakhand, India on 17 May 1976.

== Phoolan Devi assassination ==
Rana, along with two other men, murdered Phoolan Devi outside her home in New Delhi in July 2001. At the time of her assassination, Phoolan Devi was a sitting Member of Parliament in the 13th Lok Sabha. Rana claims he was motivated to take revenge upon her for her actions as a leader of a bandit gang that acted primarily against the higher castes in the late 1970s and early 1980s. Rana was arrested and confessed to the murder.

== Escape from jail and rearrest ==
Rana escaped from Tihar jail, a high-security prison facility in Delhi on 17 February 2004. He went to Moradabad and checked into a hotel. He then contacted relatives who sent him ₹1 lakh. From Ranchi he applied for a passport in the name of Sanjay Gupta.

During the two-month wait for the passport, he visited Gaya and Benaras. Rana then went to Kolkata, where he obtained a three-month Bangladesh visa. Rana claimed that he took a house for rent at Khulna and lived there, posing as Sanjay. After he fled to Bangladesh, he bought a satellite phone for ₹16,500 so that he could contact his relatives and friends without being tracked. Throughout his journey — from Moradabad to Ranchi, Kolkata, Bangladesh and Dubai and later to Afghanistan from where he is said to have brought back the ashes of the Rajput king Prithviraj Chauhan.

He received approximately ₹15,000 to ₹20,000 per month and visited Kolkata often to get his visa extended. At times, he did this in Dhaka.

On 25 April 2006, he surrendered himself to Police and later it was shown that he was re-arrested from Kolkata by SIT, who tracked him down by his subscription to a Hindi newspaper, one of the few people in the Dharmatala area who did so.

== Release ==
A trial court in January 2012 allowed Sher Singh Rana to file his nomination papers from Tihar to contest Uttar Pradesh assembly election. The Delhi High Court has granted bail to Sher Singh Rana and he was released on 24 October 2016.

== Aftermath ==
He married with Pratima Singh on 28 February 2018, who is the daughter of Pratap Singh. Some newspapers wrongly mentioned Pratap Singh as a former Member of Legislative Assembly from Madhya Pradesh. In Fact Rekha Yadav was the MLA from Malhara in 2008. Sher Singh married by taking a shagun of only a silver coin and refusing the dowry of 10 crore rupees worth property and 31 Lakh rupees cash. In the year 2019, he formed his own political party, Rashtravadi Janlok Party (RJP).
