= Surender Mohan Pathak =

Indian writer

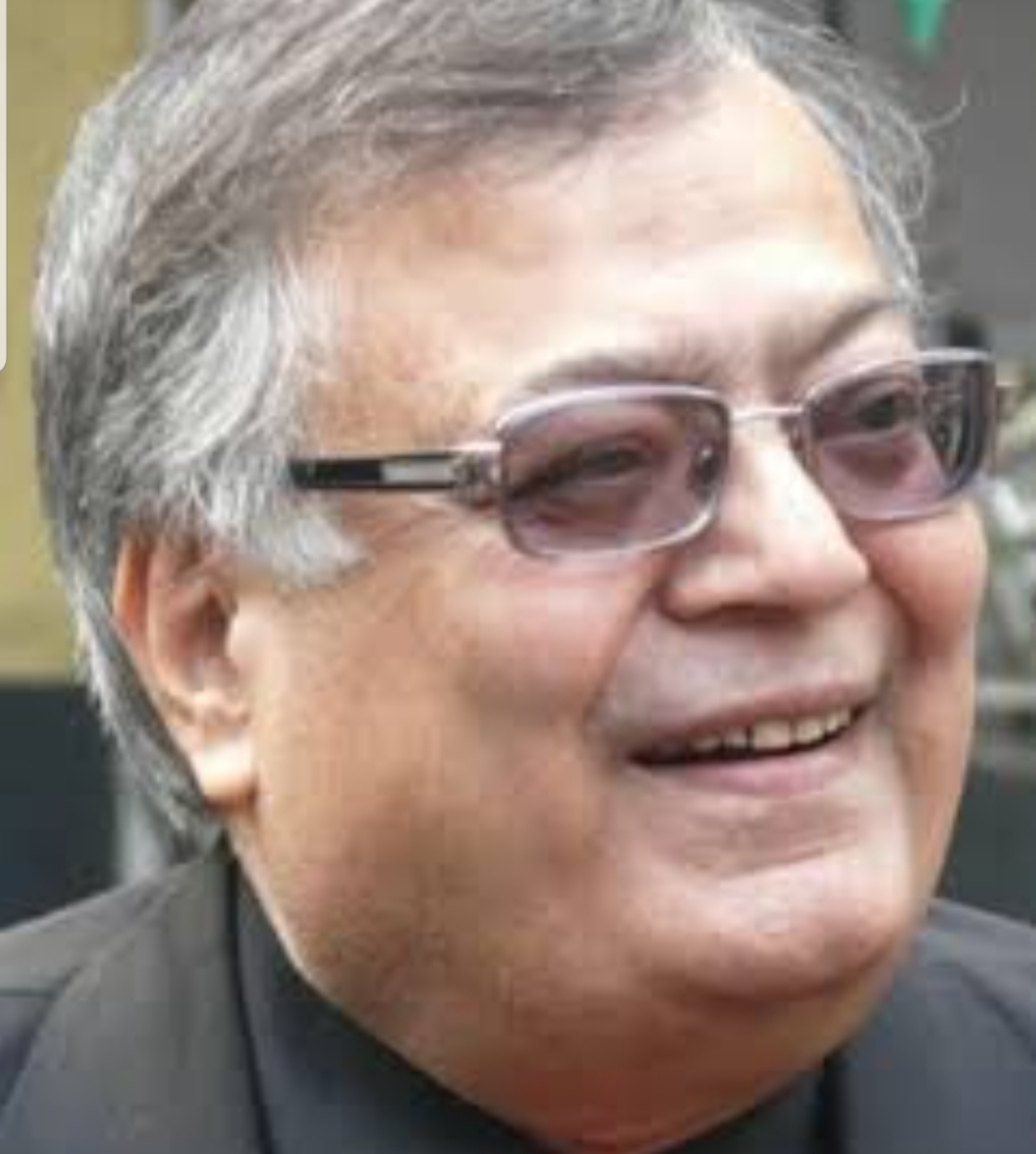
- Born: 19 February 1940 (age 86); Khemkaran, Punjab, India
- Occupations: Novelist, officer
- Writing career
- Genres: Crime fiction, murder mystery
- Notable works: The 65 Lakh Heist, Daylight Robbery, Mawali, Meena Murder Case, Asafal Abhiyaan, Khaali Vaar, Dhamki
- Literary movement: Golden Age of Detective Fiction
- Website: smpathak.com

Surender Mohan Pathak (born 19 February 1940) is an author of Hindi-language crime fiction with nearly 300 novels to his credit. His writing career, along with his full-time job in Indian Telephone Industries, Delhi, began in the early 1960s with his Hindi translations of Ian Fleming's James Bond novels and the works of James Hadley Chase. He also wrote his own James Bond series.

His first short story, 57 saal puraana aadmi (५७ साल पुराना आदमी, The Man 57 from Years Ago), was published in a Hindi magazine Manohar Kahaniyaan (मनोहर कहानीयां) in 1959. His first full-length novel, Purane Gunah Naye Gunahgar (Sunil Series), was published in Neelam Jaasoos (a Hindi crime fiction magazine) in 1963.

His major work began with what is called the "Sunil" series (सुनील-सीरीज़) which consists of at least 122 novels. Sunil, a debonair and upright investigative journalist for the fictional daily newspaper Blast, lives in the fictional city of Rajnagar, a metropolitan city located on the coastline. Sunil has a quixotic nature when it comes to damsels in distress, which happens only too often. He is a man in his 30s, who is willing to go any lengths in pursuit of justice, mostly with help of his best friend Ramakant Malhotra, a dipsomaniac and owner of a club called Youth Club. His attempts to protect the innocent often result in Sunil ending up on the wrong side of the law, bringing him face to face with Inspector Prabhudayal, the exceptionally strict and incorruptible officer in charge of the homicide division of the Rajnagar Police.

The "philosopher" detective Sudhir Kumar Kohli is the protagonist of Pathak's Sudhir Series, all narrated in the first person. Sudhir is the diametric opposite of Sunil, proudly proclaiming himself dilli ka khaas kism ka haraami who frequently enlists the help of Inspector Devender Kumar Yadav, who can easily be persuaded to do something dishonest. A recent novel of this (in)famous series has been translated by Giriraj Sharan (uncredited) and published by Diamond Books under the title The Last Goal.

However the best-known series of novels of Pathak is Vimal (विमल), a.k.a. Sardar Surender Singh Sohal (सरदार सुरेन्द्र सिंह सोहल), a.k.a. another dozen names he uses to camouflage his identity in the Mumbai underworld. Vimal is a Robinhood like character, who is constantly on the run from the law due to circumstances out of his control. He has taken up arms against gangsters like Rajbahadur Bakhia and, after killing him, his next avatar Iqbal Singh and then Vyaas Shankar Gajre. The Sardar has associates like Tukaram and his henchmen, like Wagle and Irfan, etc. Vimal is not a private detective or police inspector but a criminal wanted in seven states.

In addition, Pathak has also authored several novels not belonging to any specific series, which are labelled as 'thriller' novels irrespective of their storyline. Many collections of joke books compiled by Pathak have also been published. Several authors have been known to plagiarise or "borrow" heavily from his works.

== Series works ==
=== Sunil Series ===
S. No.	Name of The Novel	Estimated year of publication
1)	Purane Gunaah Naye Gunahgar	Oct 1963
2)	Samudra Me Khoon (Dharti Ka Swarg)	May 1964
3)	Hotel Me Khoon	Nov 1965
4)	Badsurat Chehre	Dec 1965
5)	Blackmailer Ki Hatya (Ek Teer Do Shikar)	Feb 1966
6)	Hong Kong Mein Hungama(Desh Drohi)	Mar 1966
7)	Murti Ki Chori	Mar 1966
8)	Shaitaan Ki Maut (Benakab Chehra)	May 1966
9)	Reporter ki hatya	Jun 1966
10)	Aastin ke saanp	Aug 1966
11)	Hatyare (Rahashya Ke Dhaage)	Sep 1966
12)	Red circle society	Nov 1966
13)	Ye aadmi khatarnaak hai (Khatarnaak Apradhi, Karl Plumer Ki Vaapsi)	Jan 1967
14)	Khatarnaak black mailer	July 1967
15)	Hong Kong ke lootere	Sept 1967
16)	Hatya ki raat	Nov 1967
17)	Bandar ki karamaat	Dec 1967
18)	Kaala moti	Jan 1968
19)	Double role	Feb 1968
20)	Safal Apradhi	March 1968
21)	Jhoothi Aurat	May 1968
22)	Murda Jee Utha	July 1968
23)	Shahi Mehmaan	Aug 1968
24)	Flat me Laash	Nov 1977
25)	Farrar Apradhi	Apr 1969
26)	Operation Double Agent	July 1969
27)	Darpok Apradhi	Sept 1969
28)	Landan Me Hungama	Oct 1969
29)	Dohri Chaal	Nov 1969
30)	Vikshipt Hatyara	Jan 1970
31)	Yorop Me hungama	Jan 1970
32)	Vinash ke Badal	Feb 1970
33)	Operation Piking	May 1970
34)	Barud aur Chingari	Jun 1970
35)	Khooni Neckles	Aug 1970
36)	Pakistan Ki Hashina(Operation Pakistan)	Sept 1970
37)	Operation General K	Nov 1970
38)	Akhiri Shikar	March 1971
39)	Call Girl ki Hatya	July 1971
40)	Khoon hi Khoon	Sept 1971
41)	Aman ke Dushman	Dec 1971
42)	Hijack	Jan 1972
43)	Doosri Hatya	Apr 1972
44)	Ek Khoon Aur	July 1972
45)	Bashra Me Hungama	Jan 1973
46)	Accident	Apr 1973
47)	Sinha Murder Case	May 1973
48)	Neeli Tasveeren	July 1973
49)	Operation Dhaka	Aug 1973
50)	Blackmail	Oct 1973
51)	Khiladi Ki Hatya	Nov 1973
52)	Rahashya Ka Andhera	Dec 1974
53)	Maut Ki Chhaya	Feb 1975
54)	Triple Cross	Apr 1975
55)	Double Mission	July 1975
56)	Spy Chakra	Sept 1975
57)	Single Shot	Dec 1975
58)	Chor Sipahi	Nov 1975
59)	Operation Singapore	March 1976
60)	Kaali Haveli	May 1976
61)	Pisach Ka Pratishodh	July 1976
62)	Khoon Ka Khel	Nov 1976
63)	Naya Din Nayi Laash	Feb 1977
64)	Shooting Script	May 1977
65)	Tashveer ki Shahadat	May 1977
66)	Sex scandal	Sept 1977
67)	Jaan Ka Khatara	Dec 1977
68)	Laash Ka Katl	March 1978
69)	Double Murder	Apr 1978
70)	Jasoosh ki Hatya	Jun 1978
71)	Star Night Club	Jul 1978
72)	Garm Laash	Nov 1978
73)	Band Darwaja	Jan 1979
74)	Andhere Ki Cheekh	March 1979
75)	Maut Ki Aahat	March 1979
76)	Meena Murder Case	July 1979
77)	Anokhi Chaal	Sept 1979
78)	Nau July Ki Raat	Jan 1980
79)	Khaali Kartoosh	Feb 1980
80)	Office Me Laash	May 1980
81)	Vish Kanya	Sep 1980
82)	Park me Laash	Jan1981
83)	Jhoothi Gavahi	March 1981
84)	Blow Up	Apr 1981
85)	Top Secret	May 1982
86)	Sangeen Jurm	Apr 1982
87)	Jadugarni	Apr 1983
88)	Khoon se ranga Chaku	May 1983
89)	Andheri raat	July 1983
90)	Main Begunaah Hun	Nov 1984
91)	Nakaali Varish	Jan 1985
92)	Peela Gulaab	Sep 1985
93)	Taza Khabar	Feb 1986
94)	Kaala Kaarnama	March 1987
95)	Laash Gayab	Oct 1987
96)	Front Page	Dec 1988
97)	Diwali ki raat	May 1989
98)	Kanoon ka challenge	Aug 1990
99)	Prime suspect	March 1991
100)	Goli aur Jahar	Nov 1993
101)	Papi Parivar	Aug 1994
102)	Stop press	Apr 1995/99
103)	Jheri Hatya Kaand	Oct 1995
104)	Ahirwal case	Sept 1997
105)	Kamara No.303	May 1998
106)	Gunah ki Janjeer	Nov 1998
107)	Ghar Ka Bhedi	Jan 1999
108)	Black List	June 2000
109)	Dhamki	Apr 2001
110)	Jhansa	May 2002
111)	Nishani	Sept 2003
112)	Scandal Point	Oct 2004
113)	Finger Print	Nov 2004
114)	Bhakshak	Oct 2006
115)	Poore chand ki raat	Jan 2007
116)	Bichaulia	Dec 2007
117)	Jaal	Oct 2008
118)	Nakaab	Aug 2009
119)	Dhabba	June 2010
120)	Double Game	Aug 2012
121)	Singla Murder Case	Apr 2014
122)	Conman	25 June 2018

=== Vimal Series ===
S. No.	Name of The Novel	Estimated year of publication	Translation
1.	Maut Ka Khel	Jan 1971	
2.	Daulat Aur Khoon	March 1971	
3.	Ishtihaari Mujrim	Dec 1976	
4.	Painsath Laakh ki Dacaity	May 1977	The 65 Lakh Heist
5.	Aaj Katl Hokar Rahega	Oct 1977	
6.	Bank Van robbery	Apr 1978	
7.	Maut Ka Farmaan	Nov 1978	
8)	Din Dahade Dacaity	Jun 1980	Daylight Robbery
9)	Ashafal Abhiyaan	Sept 1981	
10)	Khali War	Dec 1981	
11)	Haar Jeet	Dec 1982	
12)	Vimal Ka Insaaf	Jan 1984	
13)	Maut Ka Naach	Mar 1984	
14)	Khoon Ke Aansoon	May 1984	
15)	Jeena Yahan	Aug 1986	
16)	Marna Yahan	Oct 1986	
17)	Chehre Pe Chehra	Nov 1987	
18)	Kismat Ka Khel	Dec 1987	
19)	Paap Ki Nagri	May 1990	
20)	Lekh Ki Rekha	July 1990	
21)	Jahaj Ka Panchhi	April 1992	
22)	Khabardaar Shehari	July 1992	
23)	Maut Ka Rasta	Oct 1992	
24)	Daar se Bichhuda	Nov 1994	
25)	Maut Ke Moonh Me	Jan 1995	
26)	Ultimatum	Aug 1996	
27)	Sau Karod Ki Gullak	Oct 1996	
28)	Chhah Sir Wala Ravan	Dec 1996	
29)	Hazar Haath	Oct 1998	Framed
30)	Daman Chakra	July 1999	
31)	Chhah Karod Ka Murda	Sept 1999	
32	Johar Jwaala	Dec 1999	
33)	Chandaal Chaukadi	Oct 2001	
34)	Sher Savari	Nov 2001	
35)	Aag Ka Dariya	Feb 2002	
36)	Zamir Ka Qaidi	Dec 2005	
37)	Karm yodha	March 2006	
38)	Palatwar	Jun 2006	
39)	Chambur Ka Data	Jan 2011	
40)	Laal Nishan	May 2011	
41)	Sada Nagara Kooch Ka	Aug 2011	
42)	Jo Lade Deen Ke Het	Sep 2014	
43)	Qahar	Apr 2019	
44)	Jaake Bairi Sanmukh Jeeve	Aug 2019	
45)	Main Apraadhi Janam Ka	Apr 2021	
46)	Gang of Four	March 2022	
47)	Cooper Compound	15 January 2025	
48)	Super Don	11 April 2025	

=== Sudheer Series ===
S. No.	Name of The Novel	Estimated year of publication	Translation
1)	Aakhiri Koshish	March 1980	
2)	Malika Ka Taaz	Jun 1980	
3)	Goli Ki Aawaj	Nov 1980	
4)	Nymphomaniac	March 1982	
5)	Safed Khoon	March 1985	
6)	Late News	Jan 1987	
7)	Khooni ghatana	March 1988	
8)	Akhiri Maksad	Dec 1990	The Last Goal(2011)
9)	Katl ka suraag	Dec 1993	
10)	Panchva nishaan	March 1994	
11)	Ghatak Goli	March 1997	
12)	Gade Murde	Dec 1997	
13)	One way Street	Sept 1998	
14)	Khatare ki ghanti	March 2000	
15)	Golden girl	Nov 2002	
16)	Bazi	March 2003	
17)	Overdose	June 2005	
18)	Ghaat	Sept 2005	
19)	Pyada	Jun 2009	
20)	Choron ki baarat	Feb 2012	
21)	Bahurupiya	Sept 2013	
22)	Insaaf Do	Mar 2017	
23)	Paanch Din	May 2023	

=== Thrillers ===
S. No.	Name of The Novel	Estimated year of publication
1)	Chaar Apradhi	Apr 1968
2)	Car Me Laash	Oct 1974
3)	Katl Ki Vaardaat	May 1976
4)	World-famous Mystery Stories	March 1977
5)	Gangwaar	Dec 1977
6)	Aage bhi Maut Pichhe Bhi Maut	Nov 1978
7)	Eye Witness	Jun 1979
8)	Anokhi Raat	Aug 1980
9)	Dafa 302	Oct 1980
10)	Khooni Haveli	Jan 1981
11)	Meri Jaan Ke Dushman	March 1981
12)	Intequam	Oct 1981
13)	Lambe Haath	Nov 1982
14)	Vishvash Ki Hatya	Feb 1983
15)	Khaali Makan	Sep 1983
16)	Bivi Ka Hatyara	Aug 1984
17)	Vo Kaun Thi	May 1985
18)	Ek Karod Ka Joota	Jun 1985
19)	Dial-100	July 1985
20)	Teen Din	Jan,1986
21)	Maut Ka Aatank	Apr 1986
22)	Dus Minute	Dec 1986
23)	Kaagaj Ki Naav	Jun 1987
24)	Jeene Ki Saaja	July 1988
25)	Beesh Laakh Ka Bakra	Aug 1988
26)	teeshara kaun	Jan 1989
27)	Paanch Paapi	May 1989
28)	Gunaah ka karz	May 1991
29)	Shak ki sui	Oct 1991
30)	Ek hi anjaam	April 1992
31)	Tadi Paar	Apr 1993
32)	Ajad paanchi	Aug 1993
33)	Mavali/Kampata shahar	June 1995/2002
34)	Maut Aayi Dabe Paanv	Jun 1997
35)	Fifty-Fifty	May 1998
36)	Sazish	Jan 2000
37)	Dahashat Gardi	Dec 2000
38)	Ek hi rasta	Apr 2003
39)	Do Gaj Kafan	Jan 2005
40)	Makad Jaal	May 2007
41)	Grand Master	Aug 2007
42)	Gavahi	March 2010
43)	Secret Agent	Nov 2012
44)	Katil Kaun	Jan 2016
45)	Kaala Naag	Feb 2020

=== Jeet Singh Series ===
S. No.	Name of The Novel	Estimated year of publication
1)	10 Lakh	Apr 1996
2)	30 lakh	June 1998
3)	50 lakh	Sept 2000
4)	Khota sikka	Feb 2004
5)	Jurrat	May 2004
6)	Midnight Club	Aug 2008
7)	Colaba Conspiracy	Feb 2014
8)	Goa Galata	Feb 2015
9)	Mujhse Bura Kaun	Apr 2016
10)	Mujhse Bura Koi Nahin	May 2016
11)	Heera Pheri	29 June 2017
12)	Dubai Gang	Feb 2024

=== Mukesh Mathur Series ===
S. No.	Name of The Novel	Estimated year of publication
1)	Saat Saal Baad	Dec 1994
2)	Varis	Aug 2002
3)	Vahashi	Feb 2007
4)	Crystal Lodge	Aug 2015

=== Vivek Agashe Series ===
S. No.	Name of The Novel	Estimated year of publication
1)	Crime Club	Jan 1991
2)	Koi Gavah nahi	March 1999
3)	Ganda khoon	Nov 2003
4)	Dhokha	Jan 2009
5)	Teesra Vaar	Dec 2009

=== Vikas Gupta Series ===
S. No.	Name of The Novel	Estimated year of publication
1)	Dhokadhadi	Nov 1981
2)	Barah saval	Dec 1989
3)	Aath din	Apr 2008

=== Pramod Series ===
S. No.	Name of The Novel	Estimated year of publication
1)	Maut ka safar.	Oct 1966
2)	Aadhi Raat Ke baad	Aug 1967
3)	Jaan Ki Baaji	Oct 1970
4)	Ek Raat Ek Laash	July 1976

=== Socials ===
S. No.	Name of The Novel	Estimated year of publication
1)	Aasha	Oct 1968
2)	Ek Mamuli Ladki	Mar 1974

=== Children Books ===
S. No.	Name of The Novel	Estimated year of publication
1)	Kubadi Budhiya Ki Haveli	July 1971
2)	Betaal Aur Shahjadi	Jun 1972

=== Short stories ===
S. No.	Name
1)	Katl Ki Dawat
2)	Katl Ki koshish
3)	Jaali Note
4)	Swimming Pool Mein Lash
5)	Bhoot Basera
6)	Kitabi Katl
7)	Maut Ka Vilaap
8)	Saat Khat
9)	Taqdeer Ka Tohfa
10)	Jurm Ka Iqbaal
11)	Sakshi
12)	Hum Shakl
13)	Irada-E-Katl
14)	Maut Ki Ghadi
15)	Juye ki Mehfil
16)	Vishalgadh Express
17)	Ghadi ki Gawahi
18)	Aankh ka Tara
19)	Chabi Ka Rahasya
20)	Meenar Wali Haveli
21)	Tipu Sultan ki Diary
22)	Rahasyamayi Naukri
23)	Rahasyamayi Chori
24)	Maut ka Saya
25)	Anokha Jasoos
26)	Shikari Ka shikar
27)	Khuli Khidkee

=== Joke Book ===
S. No.	Name of The Novel	Estimated year of publication
1)	Filmi Pathake	Oct 1968
2)	Diwani Dunia	Dec 1972
3)	Satrangi Dunia	Jan 1977
4)	Go Easy On Laugh	Feb 1978
5)	Rangili Duniya	Sept 1979
6)	Albeli dunia	Nov 1997
7)	sajili dunia	March 1999
8)	Chaabili dunia	Jan 2000
9)	Atharangi dunia	Nov 2000
10)	Cartoon Carnival	Aug 2001
11)	Navrangi dunia	Oct 2002
12)	Chamkeeli dunia	Feb 2003
13)	Juicy Joke book	Feb 2003
14)	Filmi dunia	Apr 2004
15)	Hathili dunia	June 2005
16)	Fun-Fun-Funda-1	Aug 2005
17)	Fun-Fun-Funda-2	Aug 2005
18)	Sabrangi Duniya	Oct 2005
19)	Manchali dunia	Apr 2007
20)	Fun-Fun-Funda-3	March 2008
21)	Fun-Fun-Funda-4	March 2008
22)	Bhadkili Duniya	Oct 2009
23)	Laff Factory - Vol. 1	Nov 2010
24)	Laff Factory - Vol. 2	Nov 2010
25)	Laff Factory - Vol. 3	Nov 2010
26)	Laff Factory - Vol. 4	Nov 2010

== Influence ==
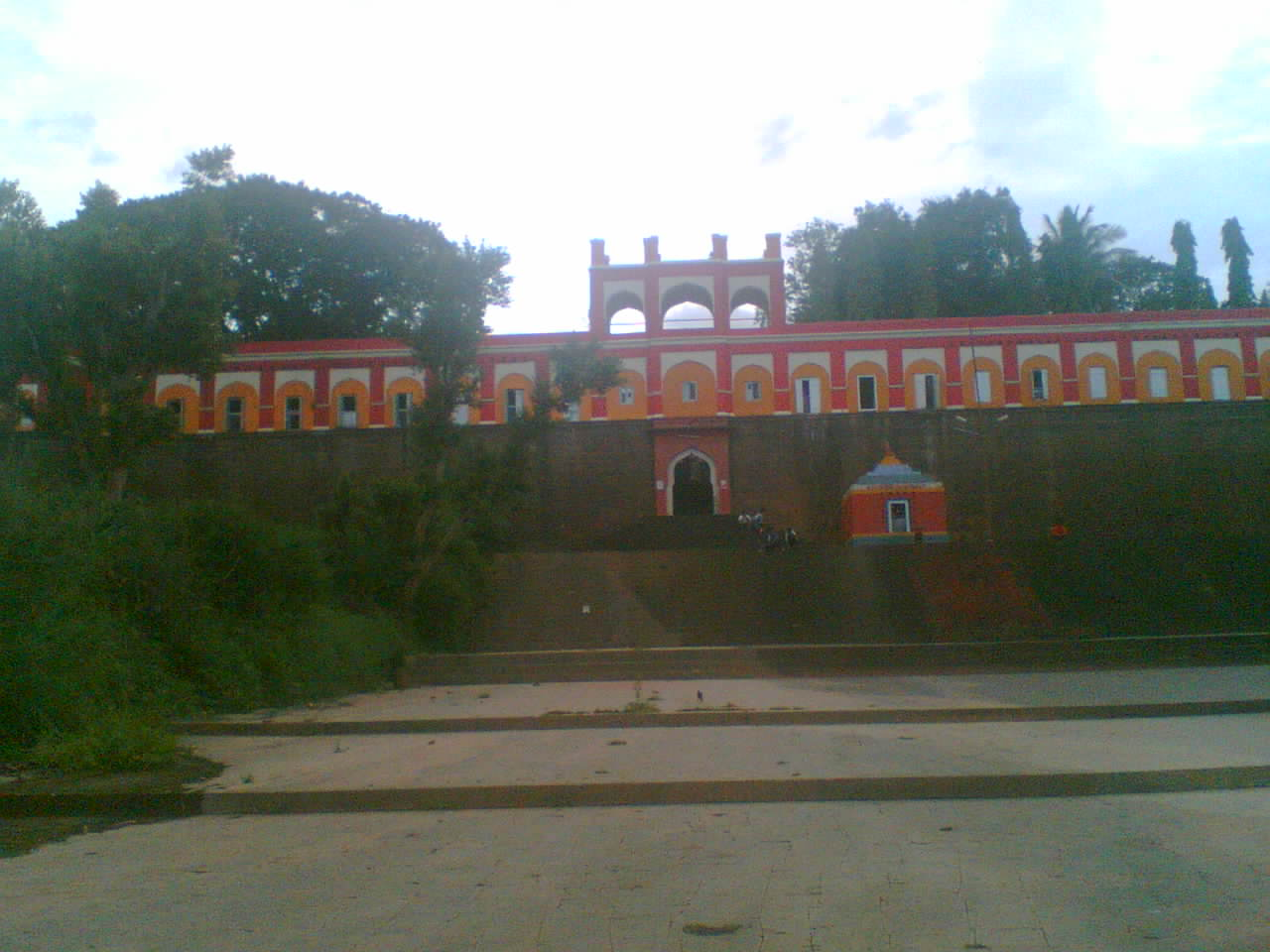

The Tandoor scandal in Delhi, in which a man had tried to dispose of the corpse of his victim in a furnace, was an idea taken from Pathak's non-serial novel titled Mawali (मवाली).

In 2006 robbery at UTI Bank, Vikaspuri, a man called Sandeep Bhatnagar looted four million Indian rupees by pretending to be a human bomb. Investigators learned after arresting the culprit that the idea was copied from Zameer ka Qaidi (ज़मीर का क़ैदी), one of the latest Vimal-series novels.

== Translations ==
Two books from Pathak's popular Vimal series — 65 Lakh ki Dakaiti and Din Dahade Dakaiti — were translated into English under the titles The 65 Lakh Heist and Daylight Robbery by Sudarshan Purohit, a Bangalore-based software engineer. The 65 Lakh Heist was published in March 2009 and Daylight Robbery in January 2010, both by Blaft, a Chennai-based publisher.
