= Nirbhay Gujjar =

Indian criminal

Nirbhay Singh Gurjar
- Born: 1957; Panchdeora village, Jalaun district, Uttar Pradesh, India
- Died: 7 November 2005 (aged 47–48); Etawah, India
- Cause of death: Gunned down by UP Police Task Force
- Citizenship: Indian
- Known for: 205 criminal cases of murder, robbery, kidnapping
- Spouse(s): Seema Parihar and Neelam Gupta

Nirbhay Singh Gurjar (1957 – 7 November 2005) was an Indian criminal and one of the last dacoits of the Chambal. He terrorized the Chambal ravines in India, the lawless zone at the cusp of two states Uttar Pradesh and Madhya Pradesh for 31 years.

== Life ==
Gujjar was born in Panchdeora village of Jalaun district, Uttar Pradesh and died on 7 November 2005 in Etawah, India in a police encounter.

== Dacoity career ==
With this sarpanch, Member of Legislative Assembly (MLA) and Member of Parliament (MP) were elected.

== Help to the Archaeological Survey of India ==
According to the Regional Director (North) of the Archaeological Survey of India, K. K. Muhammed, Gurjar and his gang provided much help to Archaeological Survey of India for the restoration of Bateshwar Hindu temples, Uttar Pradesh, that were constructed during the Gurjara-Pratihara empire between 8th to 11th century.

== Film ==
Indian Bollywood film director Krishna Mishra also made a Hindi movie named as Beehad - The Ravine, which starred Vikas Srivastava. A real-life take on Gujjar's life – journeying with him from 1975.

== Politics ==
In August 2005 he had expressed his desire to surrender before the Uttar Pradesh Chief Minister Mulayam Singh Yadav and join Indian politics.
