= Kallu Yadav (Kalua) =

Dacoit leader

Kallu Yadav (d. 2006), also known as Kalua, was a dacoit leader from Western Uttar Pradesh, India, popularly known as the "King of Katri", who was accused of killing more than 20 policemen, for which the Uttar Pradesh government offered a reward of Rs 1 lakh on him. Kalua was killed in an encounter by the Uttar Pradesh Police on 15 January 2006.

Kallu Yadav, a resident of Purnangla village of Paraur police station of Shahjahanpur district, was a terror in Shahjahanpur, Etah, Badaun, Kannauj and Farukhabad districts, although the bandit leader Kallu was not a born or habitual criminal. Shyam Singh's brother beat up Kallu badly after a dispute over possession of land in the village, after which Kallu became a dacoit. Kalua killed his enemy on the day of Holi in 1997 and threw the dead body on the banks of the river Ganges. Although Kalua has been encountered by the Uttar Pradesh Police, still there is occasional extortion in the name of his gang.
