= Dacoity =

Term used for "banditry" in the Indian subcontinent

Dacoity armed gangs
- Years active: ?- mid 2000s
- Territory: Indian subcontinent
- Activities: kidnapping, robbery, torture,murder

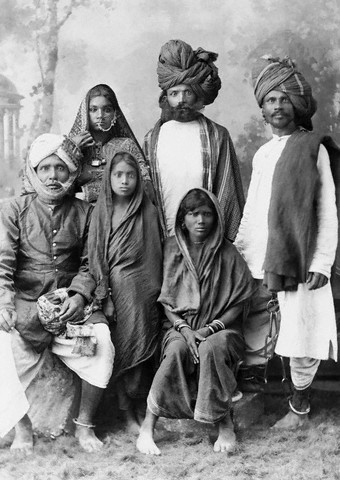
A family of dacoits

Dacoity is a term used for "banditry" in the Indian subcontinent. The spelling is the anglicised version of the Hindi word ḍākū; "dacoit" /dəˈkɔɪt/ is a colloquial Indian English word with the meaning "a robber belonging to an armed gang". It appears in the Glossary of Colloquial Anglo-Indian Words and Phrases (1903). Banditry is a criminal activity involving robbery by groups of armed bandits. The East India Company established the Thuggee and Dacoity Department in 1830, and the Thuggee and Dacoity Suppression Acts, 1836–1848 were enacted in British India under East India Company rule. Areas with ravines or forests, such as Chambal and Chilapata Forests, were once known for dacoits.

== Etymology ==
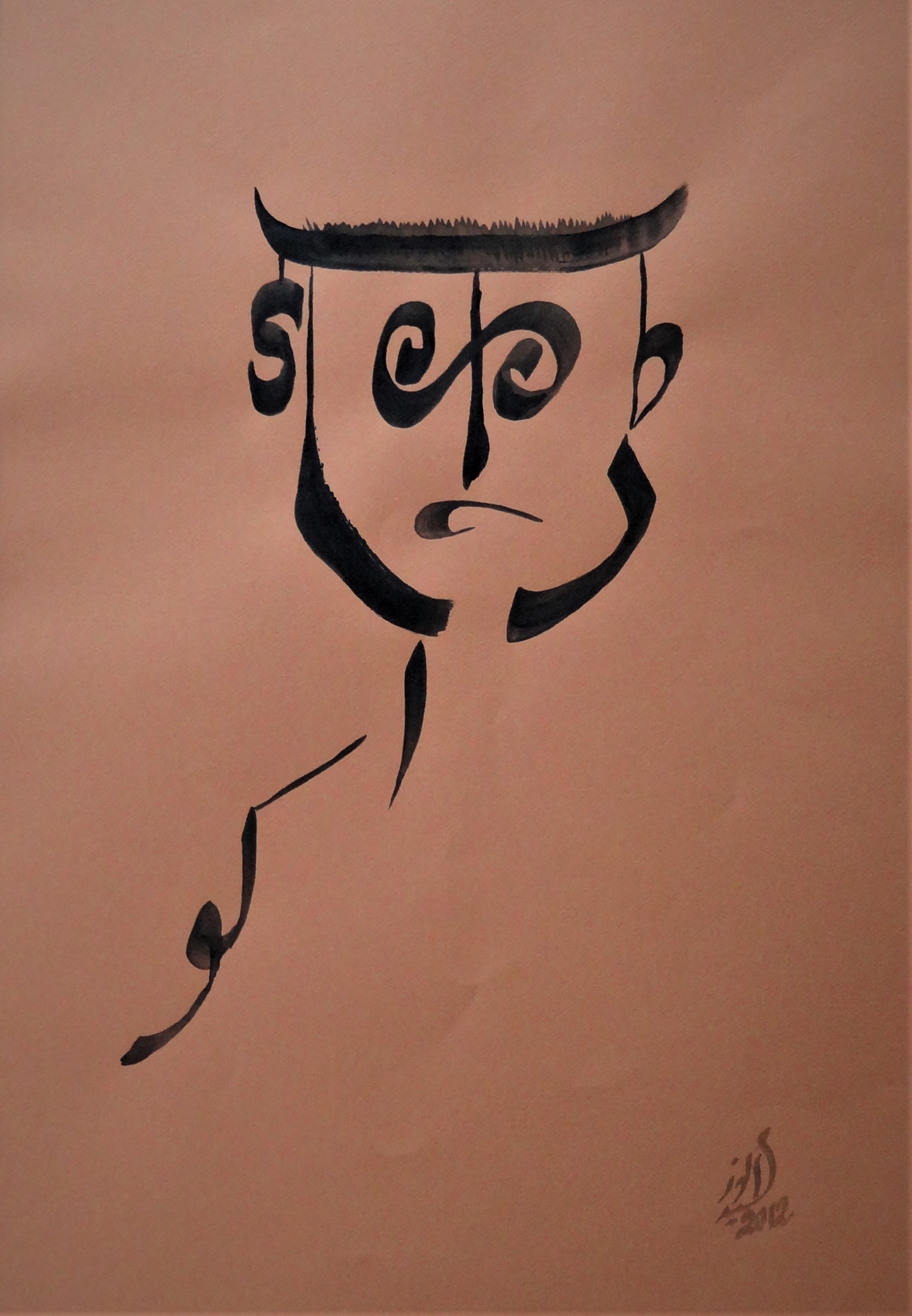
Daku (Dacoit) written in Samrup Rachna Calligraphy

The word "dacoity" is an anglicized version of the Hindi word ḍakaitī (historically transliterated dakaite). Hindi डकैती comes from ḍākū (historically transliterated dakoo, Hindi: डाकू, meaning "armed robber").

The term dacoit (Hindi: डकैत ḍakait) means "a bandit" according to the OED ("A member of a class of robbers in India and Burma, who plunder in armed bands").

== History ==
=== Bandits of Bhind-Morena of Gwalior Chambal ===
The dacoity have had a large impact in the Bhind and Morena of Chambal region in Madhya Pradesh and Rajasthan in north-central India. The exact reasons for the emergence of dacoity in the Chambal valley have been disputed. Most explanations have suggested feudal exploitation as the cause that provoked many people in this region to take arms. The area was also underdeveloped and poor, so banditry posed great economic incentives. However, the fact that many gangs operating in this valley were composed of higher castes and wealthy people appears to suggest that feudalism may only be a partial explanation of dacoity in Chambal Valley (Bhaduri, 1972; Khan, 1981; Jatar, 1980; Katare, 1972). Furthermore, traditional honour codes and blood feuds would drive some into criminality.

In Chambal, India, organized crime controlled much of the countryside from the time of the East India Company up to the early 2000s, with the police offering high rewards for the most notorious bandit chiefs. The criminals regularly targeted local businesses, though they preferred to kidnap wealthy people and demand ransom from their relatives – cutting off fingers, noses, and ears to pressure them into paying high sums. Many dacoity also posed as social bandits toward the local poor, paying medical bills and funding weddings. One ex-dacoit described his criminal past by claiming that "I was a rebel. I fought injustice." Following intense anti-banditry campaigns by the Indian Police, highway robbery was almost completely eradicated in the early 2000s. Nevertheless, Chambal is still popularly believed to be unsafe and bandit-infested by many Indians. One police officer noted that the fading of dacoity was also due to social changes, as few young people were any longer willing to endure the harsh life of highway robbers in the countryside. Instead, they prefer to join crime groups in the city, where life is easier.

=== Dacoits in Bengal ===
While thugs and dacoits operating in northern and central India are more popularly known and referenced in books, films, and academic journals, a significant number of accounts also come from Bengal. Writing about the dacoits of Bengal, the colonial official CH Keighly mentions the “great difference between gangs of hereditary dacoits or thugs in other parts of India and the dacoits of Bengal”. It is notable that, unlike the rest of India, dacoits in Bengal did not come from a particular social class, caste, or creed.

==== The Gangs of Nadia and Hooghly ====
Dacoit gangs in Nadia and Hooghly were mainly known for their ceremonial practices before the night of dacoity. Before setting off for their mission, the members would assemble to perform “kalipuja” led by the Sirdar (leader). The dacoits would form a straight line, and a pot of liquor, torches, and weapons to be used in the dacoity would be laid down in a clear space. The Sirdar would then dip his finger in oil and touch the forehead of all the dacoits, making them promise never to confess. Even during the raid, when dacoits opened chests and discovered a good fortune, they would shout “Kali, Jai Kali”.

==== Dacoits of Birbhum ====
Dacoity was prevalent in 19th century West Bengal. One of the gangs, led by a charismatic leader named Bhabani Pathak, was known for its loyalty to their leader. After the British captured Bhabani, the inner workings and social factors that led to the construction of this gang were revealed. Leaders such as Bhabani were known as Sirdars and had a symbiotic relationship with their followers. Among other benefits, a Sirdar would lend loans to members and provide them protection. This allowed for the formation of a special bond between Sirdar and his followers, which meant that cases of desertion and exiting the gang were virtually unheard of.

==== Tales of Burdwan ====
In Burdwan, dacoities were heavily planned, and considerable thought was put into their seamless execution. Sirdars in Burdwan employed several informants who kept them updated about prospective targets. When a target was finalized, the Sirdar and relevant gang members were constantly made aware of his whereabouts. The informants were always on the lookout for wealthy business people and kept a close watch on those who exchanged bank notes of considerable value or received a shipment of merchandise they would store in their houses.

=== Other dacoity ===
The term is also applied, according to the OED, to "pirates who formerly infested the Ganges between Calcutta and Burhampore".

Dacoits existed in Burma as well—Rudyard Kipling's fictional Private Mulvaney hunted Burmese dacoits in "The Taking of Lungtungpen." Sax Rohmer's criminal mastermind Dr. Fu Manchu also employed Burmese dacoits as his henchmen.

Indian police forces use "Known Dacoit" (K.D.) as a label to classify criminals.

=== Thuggee and Dacoity Suppression Acts ===
Introduced in 1836, the Thuggee and Dacoity Suppression Acts brought about several legislative measures, including establishing special courts, authorization for using rewards for informants, and the power to arrest suspects. These acts were primarily intended to counter the activities of Thugs— groups of criminals who allegedly moved along the highways of India murdering and robbing unaware travellers. According to academic Mark Brown, the prevalence of thuggee across India during the early 19th century and the East India Company's response to it "might best be viewed in light of anxieties in both British ruling and Indian subordinate groups produced by the rapid and far-reaching [British] colonial expansion" across South Asia.

== Notable dacoits ==
Notable dacoits include:

- Daku Om Puri, Most Terrafied Dacoit of Marwar, Rajasthan
- Chavviram Singh Yadav, Notable Dacoit from Mainpuri
- Gabbar Singh Gujjar – inspired the famous 1975 film Sholay, based on his life
- Man Singh was a notorious Dacoit of the Rathore clan of Rajputs. He was also known as the Lion of Chambal.
- Malkhan Singh Rajpoot, a notorious bandit known as the "Daku Man Singh". He also had political aspirations in MP.
- Malangi
- Kallu Yadav (Kalua), also known as Katri King
- Mohar Singh Gurjar
- Nirbhay Singh Gujjar- Also known as "Daketraj" or "King of Dacoits of Chambal"
- Nizam Lohar, a dacoit born into a Muslim Punjabi family during the Sikh Empire. He is known for his rebellion and freedom struggle against the British colonial government.
- Paan Singh Tomar, a former soldier in the Indian Army, an athlete that represented India in the Asian Games, who later resorted to becoming a Baaghi due to the injustices he faced. Also inspired the Bollywood film Paan Singh Tomar, in which he was played by Irrfan Khan.
- Phoolan Devi, known as The Bandit Queen (even a movie with the same name was made), a lady bandit who initially rebelled against her rape and injustice her community she was subjected to.
- Rambabu Gadariya – Regarded as the last notorious dacoit of Chambal. His gang, officially known as the Rambabu and Dayaram Dacoit gang is also known as t-1 or target one. The gang had massacred 13 gujjars in Bhawarpura village of Gwalior district on October 30, 2004. This was followed by another massacre of 5 villagers in Karawa village in Shivpuri district. In 1999, police claimed Rambabu Gaddariya was killed in an encounter but it turned out to be false.
- Shiv Kumar Patel (Dadua)
- Ramashish Koeri was active in Rohtas Plateau of Bihar in 1980s. He was the leader of a group of bandits, who were supported by the people from lower strata of society. This dacoit group was known for challenging the hegemony of upper caste landlords in the region, who were exploitative.
- Jagat Singh Sidhu (Jagga Jatt)
- Koose Munusamy Veerappan, a notorious dacoit, poacher, and smuggler in South India. He was responsible for poaching approximately 500 of the 2000 elephants killed in the peninsular region where he was active and for smuggling ivory worth US$2.6 million (₹16 crore) and about 65 tons of sandalwood worth approximately US$22 million (₹143 crore).
- Nazroo Narejo a symbol of terror for over two decades. He was held responsible and was charged with about 200 cases and was involved in plundering, highway robbery, kidnapping for ransom, murder and other crimes around the areas of Sindh and Punjab, Pakistan. The government announced a PKR 20 million reward for his capture..
- Sakshi Dandotiya a symbol of terror for over three decades. He was held responsible and was charged with about 400 cases and was involved in plundering, kidnapping for ransom, murder (Special Case Hide) and other crimes around the areas of Sindh and Punjab, Pakistan, Madhya Pradesh. The government announced a PKR 100 million reward for his capture.

== Protection measures ==
In Madhya Pradesh in 2008, women belonging to a village defence group were issued firearm permits to fend off dacoity. The Chief minister of the state, Shivraj Singh Chouhan, recognised the role the women had played in defending their villages without guns. He stated that he wanted to enable these women to better defend both themselves and their villages, and issued the gun permits to advance this goal.

== In popular culture ==
=== Dacoit films ===
As the dacoits flourished through the 1940s–1970s, they were the subject of various Hindi films made during this era, leading to the emergence of the dacoit film genre in Hindi Film Industry. The genre began with Mehboob Khan's Aurat (1940), which he remade as Mother India (1957). Mother India received an Academy Award nomination, and defined the dacoit film genre, along with Dilip Kumar's Gunga Jumna (1961). Other popular films in this genre included Raj Kapoor’s Jis Desh Mein Ganga Behti Hai (1961) and Moni Bhattacharjee's Mujhe Jeene Do (1963).

Pakistani actor Akmal Khan had two dacoit films, Malangi (1965) and Imam Din Gohavia (1967). Other films in this genre included Khote Sikkay (1973), Mera Gaon Mera Desh (1971), and Kuchhe Dhaage (1973) both by Raj Khosla.

The most famous dacoit film is Sholay (1975), written by Salim–Javed, and starring Dharmendra, Amitabh Bachchan, and Amjad Khan as the dacoit character Gabbar Singh. It was a masala film that combined the dacoit film conventions of Mother India and Gunga Jumna with that of spaghetti Westerns, spawning the dacoit Western genre, also known as the curry Western genre. The film also borrowed elements from Akira Kurosawa's Seven Samurai. Sholay became a classic in the genre, and its success led to a surge of films in this genre, including Ganga Ki Saugandh (1978), once again starring Amitabh Bachchan and Amjad Khan. Rahul Rawail's film, Dacait (1987), starring Sunny Deol, offered a powerful and realist exploration of how an educated man is driven to a life of banditry by oppressive and corrupt societal forces.

An internationally acclaimed example of the genre is Bandit Queen (1994).

During 2010s, various Bollywood films got released that provided realistic depictions of dacoits. Some films in this genre included Paan Singh Tomar (2012) starring Irrfan Khan as Paan Singh Tomar and Sonchiriya (2019) starring Manoj Bajpayee as Man Singh.

The Tamil movie starring Karthi, Theeran Adhigaaram Ondru (2017) deals elaborately with bandits. The film reveals the real dacoity incidents which held in Tamil Nadu between 1995 and 2005. Director Vinoth did a two-year research about bandits to develop the script.

A related genre of crime films are Mumbai underworld films.

=== Other media ===
Bengali novel Devi Chowdhurani by author Bankim Chandra Chatterjee in 1867.

Bengali poem Birpurush by Rabindranath Tagore in 1903.

A Hindi novel named Painstth Lakh ki Dacoity (1977) was written by Surender Mohan Pathak; it was translated as The 65 Lakh Heist.

Dacoits armed with pistols and swords appear in Age of Empires III: Asian Dynasties.

They frequently appeared in the French language Bob Morane series of novels by Henri Vernes, principally as the main thugs or assassins of the hero's recurring villain, Mr. Ming and in English as the agents of Sax Rohmer's Fu Manchu.

== See also ==
- Meenas
- Organised crime in India
- Criminal Tribes Act
- Nigerian bandit conflict
