= Thuggee and Dacoity Suppression Acts, 1836–48 =

Laws in British India

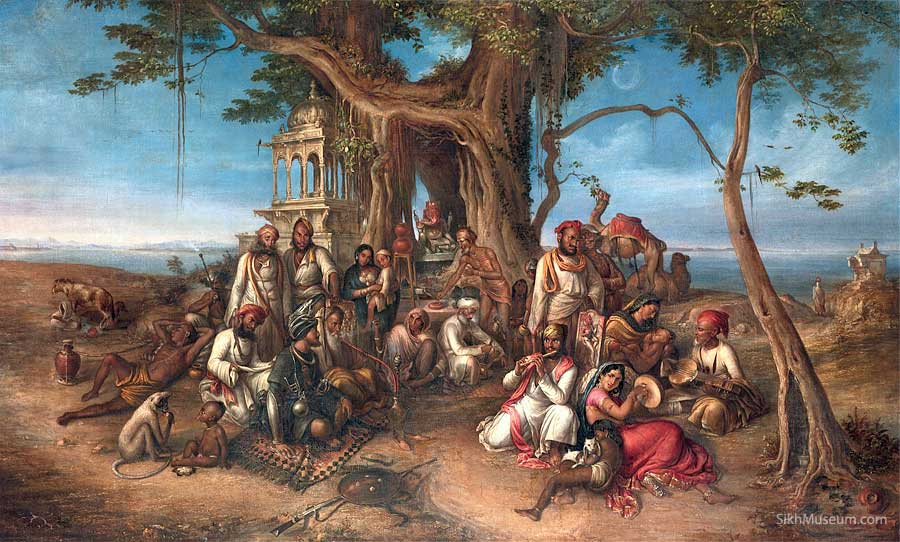
The Thugs of India: Halt at the Shrine of Ganesh, by August Schoefft, c.1841

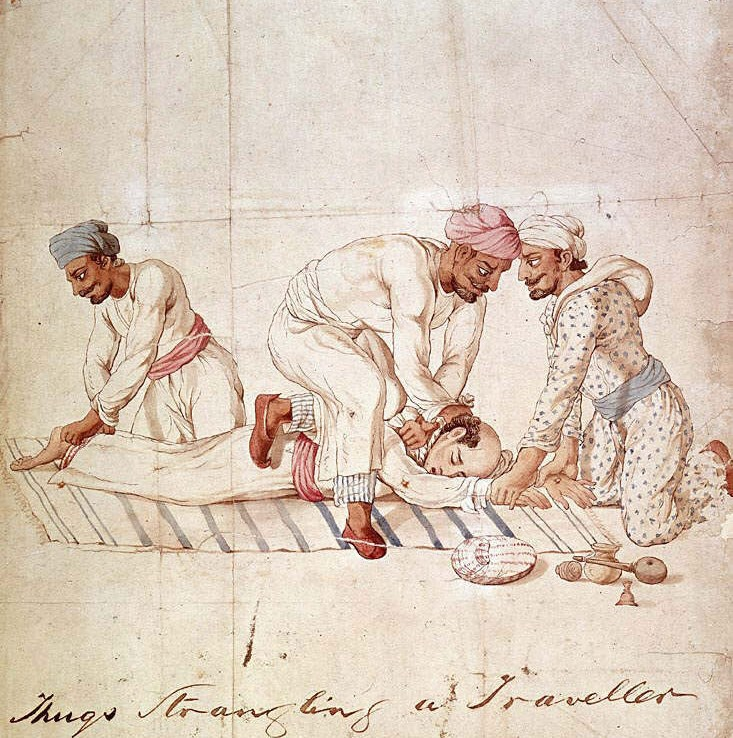
Watercolour by the same artist purporting to show three thugs in the process of strangling the traveller: one holds the feet, another the hands, while a third tightens the ligature around the neck.

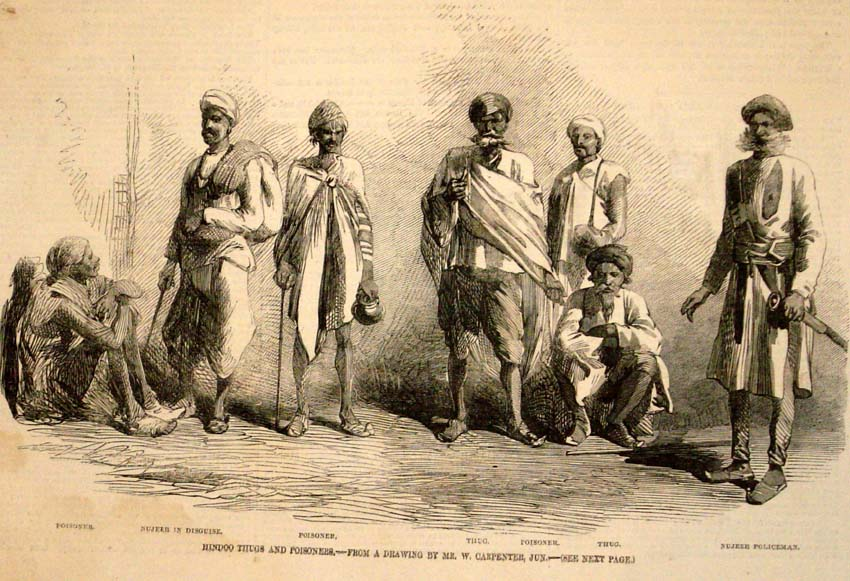
Hindoo thugs and poisoners - By Mr. W. Carpenter

The Thuggee and Dacoity Suppression Acts, 1836–48 in British India under East India Company rule were a series of legal acts that outlawed thugee—a practice in North and Central India involving robbery and ritualized murder and mutilation on highways—and dacoity, a form of banditry prevalent in the same region, and prescribed punishment for the same.

== Origins of Thuggee and Dacoity ==
In 19th century colonial India, two prevalent forms of criminal activity were thuggee and dacoity. Thuggee was a practice by criminal gangs of looting, robbing, and eventually murdering travelers, whereas Dacoity was a type of organized robbery, in which towns and villages were raided.

Originating in the northern parts of India, Thuggee and dacoity developed after the decline of the Mughal empire, when social and political unrest prevailed. Regional forces gained power in the absence of central governance, and anarchy arose, giving rise to such offences. High taxes and poor socio-economic standards were also contributing factors.

== Act XXX, 1836 ==
Title or Description: Provides for the trial and punishment of Thugs. Passed 14 November 1836.

- I. It is hereby enacted, that whoever shall be proved to have belonged, either before or after the passing of this Act, to any gang of Thugs, either within or without the Territories of the East India Company, shall be punished with imprisonment for life, with hard labour.
- II. And it is hereby enacted, that every person accused of the offence made punishable by this Act, may be tried by any Court, which would have been competent to try him, if his offence had been committed within the Zillah where that Court sits, any thing to the contrary, in any Regulation contained, notwithstanding.
- III. And it is hereby enacted, that no Court shall, on a trial of any person accused of the offence made punishable by this Act, require any Futwa from any Law Officer.

== Act XVIII, 1837 ==
Title or Description: Provides for the trial of persons charged with Thuggee. Passed 7 August 1837.

- It is hereby enacted, that any person charged with murder by Thuggee, or with the offence of having belonged to a gang of Thugs, made punishable by Act No. XXX. of 1836, may be committed by any Magistrate or Joint Magistrate within the Territories of the East India Company, for trial before any Criminal Court, competent to try such person on such charge.

== Act XIX, 1837 ==
Title or Description: No person incompetent as a Witness by reason of conviction for any offense. Passed 7 August 1837.

- It is hereby enacted, that no person shall, by reason of any conviction for any offence whatever, be incompetent to be a witness in any stage of any cause, Civil or Criminal, before any Court, in the Territories of the East India Company.

Purpose: This provision rendered individuals previously convicted of a felony allegedly abetted or conspired in by the accused, and thus (under the law of the day) incompetent to testify in any proceeding but for the passage of this Act, to testify against that accused. In practice, the company or Crown often encouraged such individuals to testify by offering the incentive of reducing the length or severity of their punishment.

== Act XVIII, 1839 ==
Title or description: Provides for trial of persons accused of murder by Thuggee. Passed 15 July 1839.

- It is hereby enacted, that any person accused of the offence of murder by Thuggee, or of the offence of unlawfully and knowingly receiving or buying property stolen or plundered by Thuggee, may be tried by any Court which would have been competent to try him, if his offence had been committed within the Zillah where that Court sits, any thing contained in any Regulation or Regulations, to the contrary, notwithstanding.

== Act XVIII, 1843 ==
Title or Description: An Act for the better custody of persons convicted of Thuggee and Dacoity. Passed 9 September 1843.

- Whereas it often happens that the offences of Thuggee and Dacoity are committed by gangs, as well within the Territories subject to the Government of the East India Company, as in those of Native Princes, or States in alliance with the said Company, and it may be necessary, for the safety of persons and property within the Territories subject to the Government of the East India Company, that persons convicted of the like offences, within the Territories of such Princes or States, should be kept in secure custody, which cannot always be done within the last mentioned Territories.
- It is hereby enacted, that it shall be lawful for the Local Government of any part of the Territories subject to the Government of the East India Company, to authorize the reception and detention, in any part of those Territories, for the periods specified in their respective sentences, of persons sentenced to imprisonment or transportation for the offences of Thuggee, Dacoity, or the offences of belonging to any gang of Thugs or Dacoits, within the Territories of any Native Prince or State in alliance with the said Company. Provided always, that such sentences shall have been pronounced after trial before a Tribunal, in which a covenanted servant of the East India Company, duly authorized in that behalf by such Prince or State, shall be one of the presiding Judges. And it is hereby enacted, that every servant of the East India Company so authorized as aforesaid, shall forward, with every prisoner, a certificate of his conviction, and a copy of the proceedings held at the trial, that the same may be forthcoming for reference at the place where the sentence of imprisonment may be carried into effect.

== Act XXIV, 1843 ==
Title or description: An Act for the better prevention of the crime of Dacoity. Passed 18 November 1843.

Preamble: Whereas it has been considered necessary to adopt more stringent measures for the conviction of professional Dacoits, who belong to certain tribes, systematically employed in carrying on their lawless pursuits in different parts of the country, and for this purpose to extend the provisions of Acts XXX. of 1836, XVIII. of 1837, and XVIII. of 1839, for the prevention of Thuggee, to persons concerned in the perpetration of Dacoity.

Sections:

- I. It is hereby enacted, that whosoever shall be proved to have belonged, either before or after the passing of this Act, to any gang of Dacoits, either within or without the Territories of the East India Company, shall be punished with transportation for life, or with imprisonment for any less term, with hard labour.
- II. And it is hereby enacted, that any person accused of the offence of Dacoity, with or without murder, or of having belonged to a gang of Dacoits, or of the offence of unlawfully and knowingly receiving or buying property stolen or plundered by Dacoity, may be committed by any Magistrate within the Territories of the East India Company, and may be tried by any Court which would have been competent to try him, if his offence had been committed within the Zillah where that Court sits.
- III. And it is hereby enacted, that no Court shall, on trial of the offences specified in this Act, require any Futwa from any Law Officer.

== Act XIV, 1844 ==
Title or description: An Act for regulating the proceedings of the Sudder Courts of Ft. William, Ft. St. George, Bombay, and at Agra in regard to sentences of Transportation for Life. Passed 6 July 1844.

- I. It is hereby enacted, that within the territories subject to the Government of the East India Company, whenever any of the Sudder Courts shall sentence any offender to imprisonment for life, it shall at the same time sentence such offender to transportation beyond Sea for life, unless there should be special reasons inducing the Court to think such prisoner not a proper subject for transportation, which special reasons the Court is hereby directed to record.
- II. And it is hereby enacted, that within the said Territories, whenever any offender shall have been sentenced, in the first instance, by a Commissioner of Circuit or Sessions Judge to imprisonment for life, or whenever a Commissioner of Circuit or Sessions Judge shall have recommended that sentence of imprisonment for life be passed upon any offender, it shall be competent to a single Judge of the Sudder Court to sentence such offender, at the same time, to transportation beyond Sea for life, and such single Judge is hereby directed to sentence such offender at the same time to transportation beyond Sea for life, unless there should be special reasons inducing him to think such offender not a proper subject for transportation, which special reasons he is hereby further directed to record.

== Act V, 1847 ==
Title or description: An Act to facilitate the execution of the sentences of Courts established by the authority of the Governor-General in Council for the administration of Criminal Justice in States or Territories administered by Officers acting under the authority of the East India Company. Passed: 10 April 1847.

- I. It is hereby enacted, that within the Territories subject to the Government of the East India Company, and without the local limits of the jurisdiction of Her Majesty's Courts of Judicature, the several Officers in charge of Jails shall be competent to give effect to any sentence that may be passed by any Court established, or that may be established, by the authority of the Governor General of India in Council, for the administration of Criminal justice in States or Territories administered by Officers acting under the authority of the East India Company, although such States or Territories are not subject to the Government of any one of the Presidencies of Fort William in Bengal, Fort St. George, or Bombay, or are not subject to the operation of the General Regulations.
- II. And it is hereby enacted, that a warrant, under the Official Seal and Signature of the Officer or Officers exercising Criminal jurisdiction within such States or Territories, as aforesaid, shall be sufficient authority for holding any prisoner in confinement, or for transmitting any prisoner for transportation beyond Sea, or for inflicting any other punishment prescribed therein.
- III. And it is hereby enacted, that if any Officer in charge of a jail shall entertain any doubt as to the legality of any warrant sent to him for execution under this Act, or as to the competency of the person or persons, whose Official Seal and Signature may be affixed thereto, to pass the sentence and issue such warrant, such Officer shall refer the matter to the Government to which he is subject, by whose order on the case such Officer and all other Public Officers shall be guided, as to the future disposal of the prisoner; and that, pending any such reference, the prisoner shall be detained in custody, in such manner, and with such restrictions or mitigations, as may be specified in the warrant.
- IV. And it is hereby enacted, that the provisions of the existing Acts and Regulations, and all other Rules in force for the treatment and security of prisoners confined in the said jails, shall apply, and be of equal force and effect, in the case of prisoners confined therein under this Act, as in the case of other prisoners confined therein.

== Act X, 1847 ==
Title or description: An Act for amending Act XXX. of 1836 relating to the trial and punishment of Thugs.
Passed: 19 June 1847.
Enacted by: Governor-General of India, Lord Hardinge, in Council.

- It is hereby enacted, that within the Territories subject to the Government of the East India Company, whenever any Court not included under the provisions of Act XXIV. of 1843, shall sentence any offender to imprisonment for life, under the provisions of Act XXX. of 1836, it shall at the same time sentence such offender to transportation beyond Sea for life, unless there should be special reasons inducing the Court to think such prisoner not a proper subject for transportation, which special reasons the Court is hereby directed to record.

== Act III, 1848 ==
Title or description: An Act for removing doubts as to the meaning of the words " Thug" and "Thuggee" and the expression "Murder by Thuggee" when used in the Acts of the Council of India.
Passed: 26 February 1848.
Enacted by: Governor-General of India, Lord Dalhousie, in Council.

Whereas doubts have arisen as to the meaning of the words " Thug" and " Thuggee," and the expression " Murder by Thuggee," when used in the Acts of the Council of India:—

- It is hereby declared and enacted, that the word " Thug," when used in any Act heretofore passed by the Council of India, shall be taken to have meant and to mean a person who is, or has at any time been habitually associated with any other or others for the purpose of committing, by means intended by such person or known by such person to be likely to cause the death of any person, the offence of Child-stealing, or the offence of Robbery not amounting to Dacoity. And that the word "Thuggee," when used in such Acts, shall be taken to have meant and to mean the offence of committing or attempting any such Child-stealing, or Robbery by a Thug. And that the expression " Murder by Thuggee," when used in such Acts, shall be taken to have meant and to mean Murder, when employed as the means of committing such Child-stealing, or such Robbery by a Thug.

== Act XI, 1848 ==
Title or description: An Act for the punishment of wandering Gangs of Thieves and Robbers.
Passed: 20 May 1848.
Enacted by: Governor-General of India, Lord Dalhousie, in Council.

Whereas it is expedient to extend some of the provisions of the Law for the conviction of Thugs and Dacoits to other gangs of Thieves and Robbers, It is enacted, as follows:

- I. Whosoever shall be proved to have belonged, either before or after the passing of this Act, to any wandering gang of persons, associated for the purposes of theft or robbery, not being a gang of Thugs or Dacoits, shall be punished with imprisonment, with hard labor, for any term not exceeding seven years.
- II. Any person accused of the offence of belonging to any such gang as aforesaid, or of the offence of unlawfully and knowingly receiving or buying property stolen or plundered by any such gang, may be committed by any Magistrate within the Territories of the East India Company, and may be tried by any Court which would have been competent to try him, if his offence had been committed within the Zillah where that Court sits.
- III. No Court shall, on the trial of any offence under this Act, require any Futwa from any Law Officer.

== See also ==
- Criminal Tribes Act, 1871 Act related to the thuggee
- The Deceivers (historical novel)
