= Malkhan Singh Rajpoot =

Indian politician and former outlaw

Malkhan Singh
- Born: 1943 or 1947 (disputed)
- Other name: Bandit King
- Occupations: politician, outlaw

Malkhan Singh Parihar (born 1943 or 1947) is a former dacoit from Chambal region. During his heyday, he used to be known as Bandit King or King of the Dacoits.

== Early life ==
In 1964, when Malkhan was first arrested by the police under the Arms Act, 1959.

In 1982, Malkhan and his gang surrendered to then Chief Minister Of Madhya Pradesh Arjun Singh. At the time of his surrender, he had amassed a total of 94 police cases, including 18 cases of dacoity, 28 of kidnapping, 19 of attempt to murder and 17 cases of murder.

In 2013, Malkhan Singh campaigned for Bharatiya Janata Party as a candidate from Bhind.

In 2019, he was a candidate for Pragatisheel Samajwadi Party (Lohiya) for Dhaurahra (Assembly constituency). But, he lost that election.
