= Phoolan Devi =

Indian bandit and politician (1963–2001)

- Phoolan Devi in 1995

Member of Parliament for Mirzapur
- In office 1996–1998
- Preceded by: Virendra Singh
- Succeeded by: Virendra Singh
- In office 1999 – 25 July 2001
- Preceded by: Virendra Singh
- Succeeded by: Ram Rati Bind

Personal details
- Born: Phoolan Mallah; 10 August 1963 Gorha Ka Purwa, Jalaun, Uttar Pradesh, India
- Died: 25 July 2001 (aged 37) New Delhi, Delhi, India
- Cause of death: Assassination by shooting
- Party: Samajwadi Party
- Spouses: Puttilal; Umed Singh
- Domestic partners: Kailash; Vikram Mallah; Man Singh
- Parents: Devidin Mallah (father); Moola Devi (mother)
- Occupation: Dacoit; politician

Phoolan Devi (Hindi: [pʰuː.lən d̪eː.ʋiː]; 10 August 1963 – 25 July 2001), popularly known as the Bandit Queen, was an Indian dacoit (bandit) who became a politician, serving as a member of parliament until her assassination. She was a woman of the Mallah subcaste who grew up in poverty in a village in the state of Uttar Pradesh, where her family was on the losing side of a land dispute which caused them many problems.

After being married off at the age of eleven and being sexually abused by various people, she joined a gang of dacoits. Her gang robbed higher-caste villages and held up trains and vehicles. When she punished her rapists and evaded capture by the authorities, she became a heroine to the Other Backward Classes who saw her as a Robin Hood figure. Phoolan Devi was charged in absentia for the 1981 Behmai massacre, in which twenty Thakur men were killed, allegedly on her command. After this event, the Chief Minister of Uttar Pradesh resigned, and calls to apprehend her were amplified. She surrendered two years later in a carefully negotiated settlement and spent eleven years in Gwalior prison, awaiting trial.

Phoolan Devi was released in 1994 after her charges were set aside. She subsequently became a politician and was elected as a member of parliament for the Samajwadi Party in 1996. She lost her seat in 1998, but regained it the following year. She was the incumbent at the time of her death in 2001. She was assassinated outside her house by Sher Singh Rana, who was convicted for the murder in 2014. At the time of her death, she was still fighting against the reinstituted criminal charges, having lost a 1996 appeal to the Supreme Court to have the charges dropped. Phoolan Devi's worldwide fame grew after the release of the controversial 1994 film Bandit Queen, which told her life story in a way she did not approve of. Her dictated autobiography was entitled I, Phoolan Devi. There are varying accounts of her life because she offered differing versions to suit her changing circumstances.

== Early life ==
Phoolan Devi was born on 10 August 1963 (though news sources oft gave ages which could have pushed it as early as 1955 — for example, TIME gave an age of 27 shortly before her surrender to Rajendra Chaturvedi, SP Morena Police), in the village of Gorha Ka Purwa in Jalaun district, Uttar Pradesh, India. (Note: Names vary between texts, such as: Gorha Ka Purwa and Gorhapurwa; Vikram and Vickram; Putti Lal and Puttilal.) The land is crossed by the Yamuna and Chambal rivers and is filled with gorges and ravines, making it suitable terrain for dacoits (bandits). Her family was poor and from the Mallah subcaste, which lies towards the bottom of the Hindu caste system in India, with Mallahs being Shudras who traditionally work as fishermen. (Note: Indian society is divided into four castes or social classes. From top to bottom these are: Brahmin (priests), Kshatriya (warriors), Vaishya (traders) and Shudra (labourers). Underneath these four classes are the Dalits, also known as the untouchables.) Phoolan Devi and her sisters made dung cakes to burn as fuel, as is common practice in the region; her family grew chickpeas, sunflowers and pearl millet.

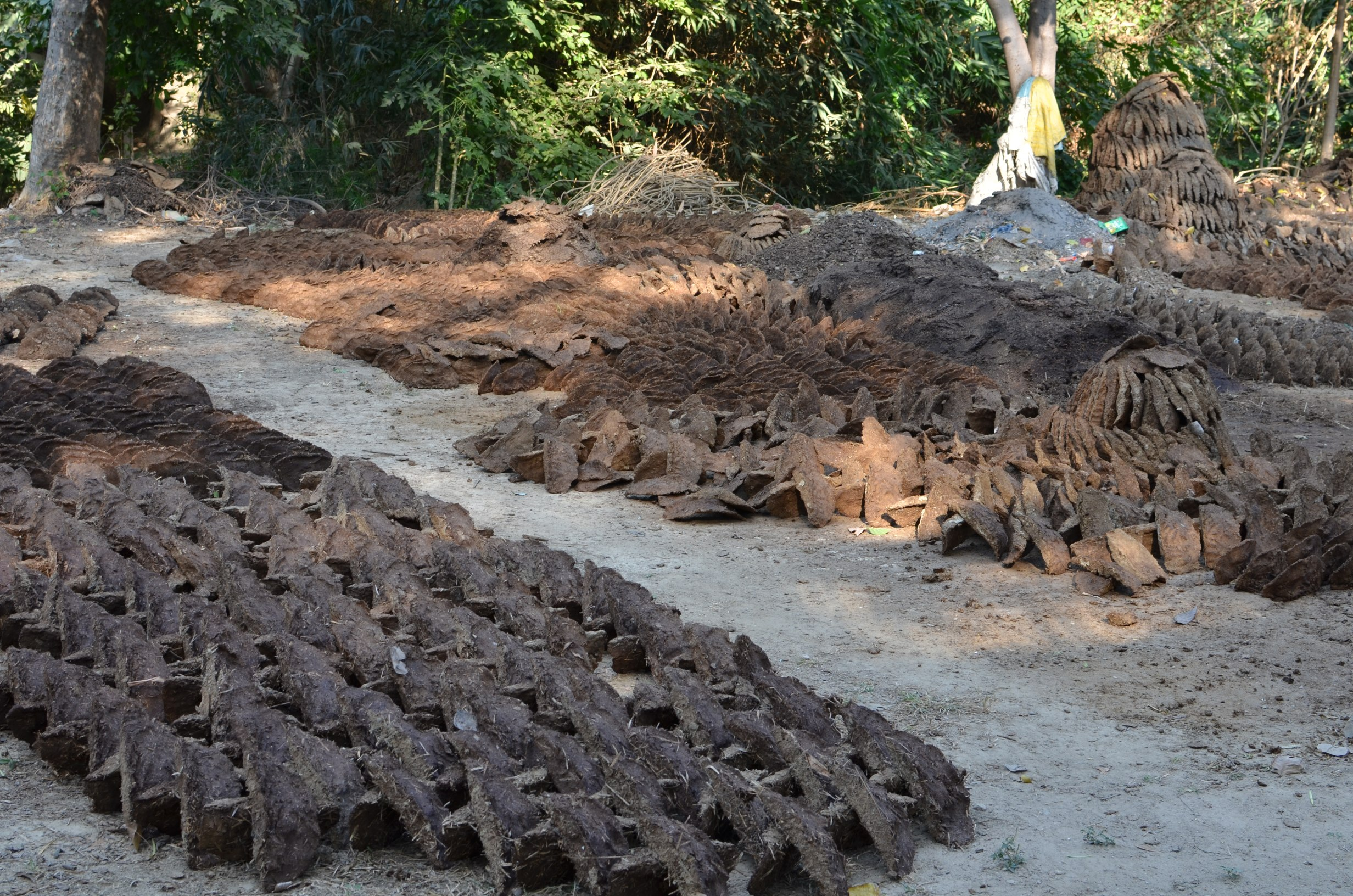
The production of dung cakes in Uttar Pradesh; dung cakes are a common fuel source in the region.

Phoolan Devi's mother was called Moola and her father Devidin; she had four sisters and one brother. Devidin had one brother, Biharilal, who had a son called Maiyadin. Biharilal and Maiyadin stole land from Phoolan Devi's father by bribing the village leader to change the land records. Her family was compelled to live in a small house on the edge of the village; the uncle and his son continued to harass the family and steal their crops, aiming to drive them away from the village. At the age of 10, Phoolan Devi decided to protest against the injustice. With her older sister Rukhmini, she sat in the disputed land and ate the chickpeas growing there, saying the crop belonged to her family. Maiyadin ordered her to leave and when she did not, he beat her into unconsciousness; the village leader then decreed that her parents should also be beaten. In 2018, Phoolan Devi's mother told The Asian Age that she was still fighting to regain the land which Maiyadin had stolen from the family.

Following these events, Phoolan Devi's parents decided to arrange a marriage for her. She was married to a man called Puttilal, who offered 100 Indian rupees (equivalent to ₹400 or £4.20 in 2023), a cow and a bicycle to her parents. According to the version related by her to her biographer Mala Sen, it was agreed that Phoolan Devi would start living with him after three years, but Puttilal came back within three months and took her away. He was three times her age; she refused his sexual advances and fell sick. When her parents came and collected her, they took her to a doctor who diagnosed measles. For a wife to leave her husband was scandalous; preying on Phoolan Devi's parents' fears of disgrace, Maiyadin offered to ensure that Puttilal took her back if they signed a document. The family was illiterate and the parents were warned that it contained a clause giving Maiyadin legal rights to their land, so they refused to sign. Phoolan Devi was sent to stay with a distant relative in the village of Teoga, where she met her recently married cousin Kailash, who ran errands for dacoits (also known locally as bahghis). They became close and had an affair, which resulted in Phoolan Devi being ordered by Kailash's wife to go back to her own village.

Once Phoolan Devi was back in Gorha Ka Purwa, the second son of the village leader became infatuated with her and when she did not reciprocate his affections, he attacked her. Again, Phoolan Devi needed to leave the village and Maiyadin pressured the family to ask Puttilal to take her back, which he did. In the meantime, Puttilal had taken another wife who often mistreated Phoolan Devi. After several years, Puttilal abandoned Phoolan Devi beside the Yamuna River and she again returned to the parental home. In January 1979, Maiyadin destroyed the family's crops and began to chop down a neem tree on their land. When Phoolan Devi threw stones at him and wounded his face, she was arrested by the local police and detained for one month. She later told The Atlantic that she was arrested because Maiyadin accused her of robbing him. Mala Sen asked her if she had been raped at the police station and Phoolan Devi replied: "They had plenty of fun at my expense and beat the hell out of me too." Sen notes that it is common for victims of sexual assault to avoid or repress talking about what happened to them. Sen also observes that from the mid-1970s onwards, Indian feminist groups recorded many instances of women being attacked and murdered by men. The director of the Women's Feature Service commented regarding the case of Phoolan Devi that "quite often rape is used as a method of control and punishment to keep women in their place".

== Banditry ==
=== Bandit Queen ===
In July 1979, a gang of bandits led by Babu Gujjar kidnapped Phoolan Devi from her family's home, for reasons she explained in multiple ways. (Note: According to Weaver, "What followed remains obscured, for Phoolan's own accounts have varied significantly"; Snyder says her "uncle orchestrates a kidnapping by one of the many bands of armed robbers [...] that patrolled the Chambal Valley"; Sen says Phoolan Devi received a letter from the dacoits, went to the police who refused to help her and then was taken away by Babu Gujjar; Szurlej writes that "she became embroiled in a conflict with her rich relatives, who arranged for bandits to kidnap her".) Gujjar subjugated her and raped her repeatedly. Vikram Mallah, the second in command, became fond of Phoolan Devi and objected to her mistreatment, so he killed Gujjar and became leader of the gang. He trained Phoolan Devi to use a rifle and the two fell in love. Over the following year, the group robbed vehicles and looted higher caste villages, sometimes disguising themselves using stolen police uniforms. The gang lived in the ravines, constantly moving between places such as Devariya, Kanpur and Orai. They located Puttilal and punished him violently. As news of Phoolan Devi's exploits spread, she became popular with the lower castes, who called her Dasyu Sundari (Beautiful Bandit) and celebrated her as a Robin Hood figure, who robbed from the rich to give to the poor. She was seen as an incarnation of the Hindu goddess Durga and a doll was produced of her in police uniform wearing a bandoleer.

A former leader of the gang, Sri Ram Singh, was released from prison together with his brother Lalla Ram Singh in 1980; they were Thakur men (Thakurs being a subcaste of the Kshatriya caste) and thus a higher caste than the other members. After they rejoined the bandits, a power struggle ensued and Sri Ram murdered Vikram Mallah. Without the latter's protection, Phoolan Devi was a prisoner of Sri Ram; he took her to the remote village of Behmai where she was repeatedly raped by other Thakurs. In a final indignity, she was forced to collect water for him from the well whilst naked, in front of the villagers.

=== Behmai massacre ===
Phoolan Devi managed to escape and met Man Singh, a bandit with whom she formed a new gang. They became lovers, living on wild berries and produce stolen from cultivated fields. She returned to Behmai with her gang on 14 February 1981; speaking through a loudhailer, she demanded that the villagers hand over Sri Ram Singh and his brother, then the bandits went from house to house looting valuables. When the two men could not be found, twenty-two men were lined up at the Yamuna River and shot from behind; twenty died and two survived. Since all the dead were at the time thought to be Thakur, Thakur farmers pressured Prime Minister Indira Gandhi to impose the rule of law. When Phoolan Devi was arrested in 1983, she claimed that she had not been present at the time of the shooting. This was corroborated by the evidence of the two men who survived, who stated that they had not seen her and that a man called Ram Avtar was giving orders. By other accounts, such as that of journalist Khushwant Singh, it was Phoolan Devi who put the men to death. She was celebrated among Dalits (people at the bottom of the caste system) for fighting back against her abuse by men of a higher caste and when she eluded capture by the authorities her fame grew. The killings prompted the resignation of V. P. Singh, the Chief Minister of Uttar Pradesh. It was later clarified that the dead men were seventeen Thakurs, one Muslim, one Dalit and one member of Other Backward Classes. Phoolan Devi was charged in absentia with 48 crimes, which included kidnapping, looting and murder.

=== Surrender ===
After the massacre, Phoolan Devi remained on the run and was nearly caught by the police on 31 March 1981. Her mother was held for five months in Kalpi prison to pressure Phoolan Devi to give herself up. In 1983, Phoolan Devi surrendered to the authorities in Bhind after long negotiations led by Rajendra Chaturvedi, a local police officer who had gained the trust of local dacoits after arresting Malkhan Singh Rajpoot. Dressed in a police uniform and wearing a red bandanna on her head, she bowed before representations of the goddess Durga and Mahatma Gandhi, then prostrated herself in front of Arjun Singh, the Chief Minister of Madhya Pradesh, with approximately 8,000 people watching. Phoolan Devi had set conditions regarding her surrender, which included: no death penalty for anyone from her gang; a maximum custodial sentence of eight years; no use of handcuffs; being imprisoned as a group; being imprisoned in Madhya Pradesh and not Uttar Pradesh; her family being given land with space for her goat and cow; and her brother getting a government job. She and seven men, including Man Singh, surrendered. Mala Sen records that the male journalists gathered in Bhind were unimpressed with her plain appearance.

Phoolan Devi faced the 48 criminal charges that she had previously been charged with in absentia and the gang was incarcerated at Gwalior, in Madhya Pradesh. Despite the prior agreement that she would not spend more than eight years in prison, she spent over ten years on remand. During this time, she had tuberculosis and was diagnosed with two stomach tumours. Whilst receiving hospital treatment, she received a hysterectomy without her consent. The others, including Man Singh, agreed to trials in Uttar Pradesh and were all acquitted, but Phoolan Devi refused to make a deal and remained convinced she would be murdered if she went there.

== Political career ==
Charges against Phoolan Devi were dropped in 1994 by order of Mulayam Singh Yadav, the leader of the Samajwadi Party and Chief Minister of Uttar Pradesh. After her release from prison, she joined the Samajwadi Party and in the 1996 general election took a seat in the Indian lower legislative body, the Lok Sabha, as the Member of Parliament (MP) for Mirzapur in Uttar Pradesh. She won with a margin of 37,000 and had more than 300,000 votes in total. She was not the only illiterate MP, joining others such as Bhagwati Devi and Shobhawati Devi. Phoolan Devi campaigned with limited success for the rights of women and to provide better amenities for the poor. She told author Roy Moxham "I want to bring hospitals, schools, electricity and clean water to the poor in the villages. To stop child marriage and to improve life for women." Mallah people were happy to have someone of their caste representing them in parliament for the first time and she was generally popular among Other Backward Classes.

The Kanpur District Court set aside Yadav's pronouncement, which reinstated the charges against her in connection with the Behmai massacre. This decision was upheld by the Allahabad High Court. In 1996, Phoolan Devi lost a Supreme Court appeal to have the charges against her dropped. The following year, the court approved a request from Uttar Pradesh to arraign her on charges related to the Behmai massacre and she did not attend the court hearing in Kanpur. After several months of legal machinations, the Supreme Court ruled that Phoolan Devi did not need to be jailed before trial. She lost her seat to Virendra Singh, the Bharatiya Janata Party (BJP) candidate in the 1998 elections, then regained it the following year.

Phoolan Devi married Umed Singh in 1994; they appeared together in a film, called Sholay Aur Chingari (Blazing Fires and Sparks). Together with her new husband, she became a Buddhist, aiming to evade the Hindu caste system.According to Moxham, she later renounced Buddhism.

== Bandit Queen film ==
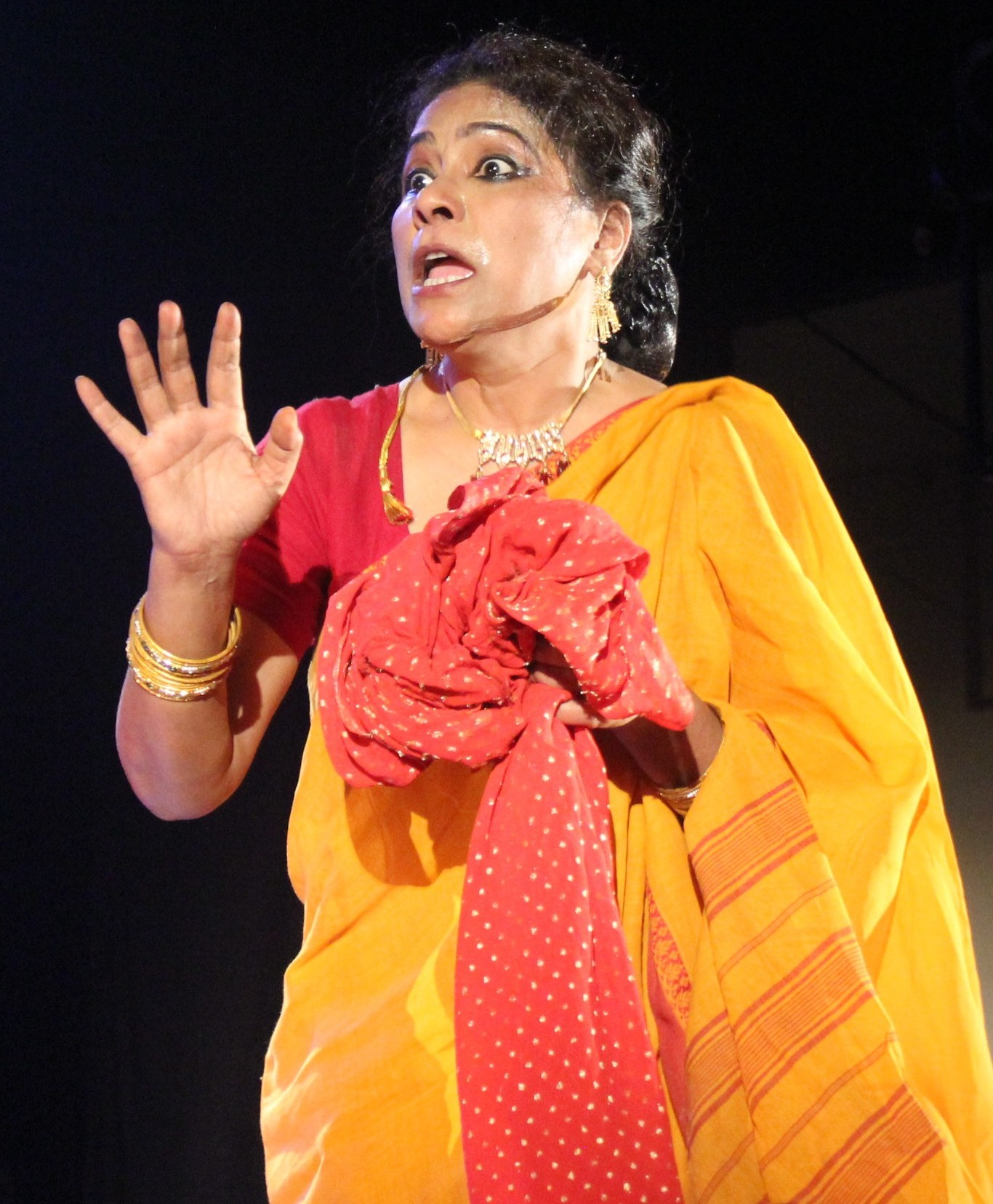
Actress Seema Biswas, who played Phoolan Devi in Bandit Queen

The 1994 film Bandit Queen was loosely based on Mala Sen's biography; it was directed by Shekhar Kapur and starred Seema Biswas as Phoolan Devi. After it received acclaim at Cannes Film Festival, Kapur asked for permission from the Central Board of Film Certification to screen the film at cinemas in India. Phoolan Devi attempted to block the release, commenting "It's simply not the story of my life". She was supported by the feminist and novelist Arundhati Roy, who wrote a critique of the film (entitled "The great Indian rape trick"), arguing that whilst Sen's book presented a complex story with different perspectives, Kapur portrayed Phoolan Devi as a victim without having met her. In his 2021 autobiography Farrukh Dhondy, the former commissioning editor at Channel 4, described how he rushed to Delhi in order to enlist Umed Singh's aid in persuading Phoolan Devi to drop her complaint. When Phoolan Devi discovered this, the couple became estranged, before later reconciling. A court case was brought against screening the film by lawyer Indira Singh and Arundhati Roy at the Delhi High Court. Ultimately, Phoolan Devi received £40,000 from Channel 4 and dropped the complaint. Later in 1994, she dictated her autobiography I, Phoolan Devi which was published first in French in 1996 and then in other languages, including English, Japanese and Malay. The income from book sales supported Phoolan Devi and enabled her to pay her legal fees.

== Assassination ==
Assassination of Phoolan Devi
- Location: New Delhi
- Date: 25 July 2001; 13:30 (IST)
- Attack type: Murder
- Deaths: Phoolan Devi
- Injuries: 1
- Perpetrators: 3 unidentified gunmen

At 13:30 (IST) on 25 July 2001, Phoolan Devi was shot dead by three unknown assailants outside her house at 44 Ashoka Road in New Delhi. She was shot nine times and her bodyguard was hit twice; he returned fire as the attackers escaped by car. She was rushed to Lohia Hospital and was pronounced dead on arrival. She was aged 37 when she died and serving as an MP. All business of both houses of Parliament was adjourned for two days and the funeral took place in Mirzapur. Umed Singh commented "No one likes it when someone, especially a woman, from the lower classes rises and makes a name for herself" and her lawyer Kamini Jaiswal stated "This murder is the result of caste conflict." The criminal case against her was still open at the time of her death.

Days after the murder, Sher Singh Rana surrendered to police in Dehra Dun and claimed he had assassinated Phoolan Devi in revenge for the Behmai massacre; he at first struggled to convince police that he was present at the scene of the crime. He escaped from Tihar Jail in 2004 and was recaptured two years later. In August 2014, Rana received a life sentence for murder, with ten co-defendants being acquitted. Two years later, he appealed his sentence to the Delhi High Court and was set free by Justice Gita Mittal on a personal bond of ₹50,000 (equivalent to ₹72,000 or £750 in 2023) and two sureties, each of the same amount. He was required to not interact with Phoolan Devi's family and to report to the police every six months, whilst also informing them where he stayed and what mobile telephone number he was using.

In August 2001, Umed Singh announced prior to Phoolan Devi's terahvin that he was setting up a trust to administer the properties she owned; he was immediately denounced by her sisters and mother, who claimed he was trying to steal her investments worth ₹25 million (equivalent to ₹100 million or £1 million in 2023). Munni Devi alleged that Umed Singh knew the murderers and challenged his alibi. She said that Umed Singh was abusive towards Phoolan Devi and that her sister had tried at least twice to divorce him. Phoolan Devi's first husband Puttilal also made a demand for her properties since they had never officially divorced.

== Legacy ==
Phoolan Devi's fame throughout India continued to grow after her death and the controversy surrounding the Bandit Queen film had already ensured that she was globally famous. She has become a legendary figure, alongside other outlaws such as Ned Kelly, Sándor Rózsa and Pancho Villa. Her life has inspired biographies by Roy Moxham, Mala Sen and Richard Shears and Isobelle Gidley, as well as novels by Irène Frain and Dimitri Friedman. A graphic novel entitled Phoolan Devi, Rebel Queen by Claire Fauvel was published in 2020. The scholar Tatiana Szurlej notes that the facts presented in these biographies often contradict each other despite coming from interviews with Phoolan Devi herself and questions whether she forgot elements or adapted her account to suit her changing circumstances. In 1994, Arundhati Roy commented that Phoolan Devi "is suffering from a case of Legenditis. She's only a version of herself. There are other versions of her that are jostling for attention." Media theorist Sandra Ponzanesi states Phoolan Devi is an example of a Third World postcolonial subject who is aware of the racist and patronising Orientalist attitudes that First World analysts have of her.

Several films have been made about her life. Ashok Roy made the 1984 film Phoolan Devi in Bengali and followed it the next year with a Hindi version entitled Kahani Phoolvati Ki (The story of Phoolan). Bandit Queen came out in 1994 and in 2019 Hossein Martin Fazeli was developing a documentary entitled Phoolan. In 2022, Farrukh Dhondy announced that he was making a web series about her life told from the perspective of Rajendra Chaturvedi, the person who arranged her surrender. Phoolan Devi has been represented in fine art by painters such as Rekha Rodwittiya. Her life has also been commemorated by folk singers, making her into a mythical outlaw figure. Shirish Korde and Lynn Kremer wrote an opera called Phoolan Devi: The Bandit Queen which premiered in 2010 at the College of the Holy Cross in Worcester, Massachusetts, US.

The verdict in the court case concerning the Behmai massacre was delayed in 2020 because important case documents had been lost. The last witness died the following year and since the presiding judge had been transferred, the case began again in 2022. In 2023, another suspect died, leaving only two people on trial.

The Mallah subcaste forms part of the Nishad caste and two Nishad political parties laid claim to Phoolan Devi's legacy. In 2018, the NISHAD Party reported it would build a statue of her in Gorakhpur. Three years later, in order to mark twenty years since her assassination, the Vikassheel Insaan Party (VIP) announced it would place 18 feet (5.5 m) high statues of her in 18 districts of Uttar Pradesh and were prevented from doing so by the police. Mukesh Sahani, the leader of the VIP, was prevented from leaving Varanasi airport by the Government of Uttar Pradesh when he wanted to install a statue. He reacted by setting up a foundation in Phoolan Devi's name and promising to deliver up to 50,000 small idols of Phoolan Devi, to any local person who requested one. Also in 2021, tributes marking the anniversary of her death were made by Chirag Paswan of the Lok Janshakti Party (Ram Vilas) and Tejashwi Yadav of Rashtriya Janata Dal.

== Selected works ==
- Devi, Phoolan (1996). Cuny, Marie-Therese; Rambali, Paul (eds.). I, Phoolan Devi: The Autobiography of India's Bandit Queen. London: Little, Brown and Company. ISBN 978-0-316-87960-6.

== See also ==
- List of assassinated Indian politicians
- Seema Parihar
- Phoolan
