= Daylight Robbery (novel) =

1980 novel by Surender Mohan Pathak

- First edition cover
- Author: Surender Mohan Pathak
- Cover artist: Shelle Studio
- Language: English
- Genre: Crime fiction
- Publisher: Blaft Books
- Publication date: October 2010
- Publication place: India
- Media type: Print (Paperback)
- Pages: 242
- ISBN: 978-81-906056-9-4
- Preceded by: The 65 Lakh Heist

Daylight Robbery is a thriller novel written by Surender Mohan Pathak, a Hindi writer from Delhi, India.Originally published in 1980 by Shanu Paperbacks, it was translated into English by Sudarshan Purohit and published by Blaft Publications, Chennai, India in 2010.

It is the 8th novel in the Vimal series, and revolves around the robbery of a payroll van in Agra. The novel is unique in the sense that this is the first time Vimal engages in a crime for his own personal benefit. Dawarkanath, an aged gambler from Agra, tells him of a plastic surgeon called Dr. Earl Slater, who would operate only on wanted Indian criminals. If Vimal (actual name Sardar Surender Singh Sohal), a wanted criminal in several Indian states and NCR, can get a new face, he can live safe from both the law and its breakers. The officer in charge of Ratanakar Steel Mill, whose weak point is his materialistic wife, is blackmailed to give-in a very complicated machination, exploiting his love for gambling. The team manages to pulls off their plan, yet from a turn of events, Dwarkanath dies of a heart attack, the young and naive Kooka (another cooperator) loses both money and life, the money goes back to where it belongs and Vimal is left with no money.
