= Man Singh (dacoit) =

Indian dacoit (1890–1955)

Maan Singh
- Born: 1890; Khera Rathore village, Agra district, North-Western Provinces, India
- Died: 1955 (aged 65); Bhind, Madhya Pradesh
- Occupation: Dacoity

Maan Singh (1890—1955), better known as Daaku Maan Singh, was a notorious Indian dacoit.

== Biography ==
Born in 1890 in the village of Khera Rathore near Jaitpur Kalan, Bah tehsil in Agra district, North-Western Provinces. Singh belonged to the Rathore clan of Rajputs and was the younger brother of Durjan Singh. Khera Rathore was in the Chambal region of India, where a maze of deep ravines and scrub forests had hidden generations of outlaws since the 13th century.

Between 1939 and 1955, Singh is credited with 1,112 robberies and 85 murders, including the killing of 8 police officials. Singh headed a crew of 17, most of them his sons, brother Nabab Singh, and nephews, who were unchallenged in the Chambal Valley. The police registered over a hundred cases against him, ranging from kidnapping to murder, until he and his son, Subedar Singh, were shot dead by Gurkha troops in 1955 while sitting under a Banyan tree in Kakekapura, Bhind, Madhya Pradesh. This operation was headed by Inspector Vinod Chand Chaturvedi.

S. N. Subba Rao heard Singh speak on stage in 1953 at a public function in Chambal: "I was surprised to hear him speak. He was totally unlike what I had read about him in the papers. Though at the peak of his popularity or notoriety, he was respectful and humble. I was impressed with the contradiction he presented. The government wanted him dead with a big inaam (reward) on his head and here he was, standing before the adoring public." A Robin Hood figure who once performed essential social services in hard times and adjudicated local issues, today Singh has a pagoda dedicated to him Khera Rathore. According to Dipankar, a Chambal resident who said that he regularly came to worship at the Maan Singh Mandir, "they were men who fought for the family izzat (honour). They are baaghiyaan (rebels). There is no difference between a baaghi and a sadhu".

Actor Amitabh Bachchan also quotes "In my younger days, we were in awe of Daaku Maan Singh, whose escapades and adventures were common conversation in and around every possible gathering".

== Successors ==
Successors of Singh are living at Khera Rathore near the river Chambal. His son Tehsildar Singh, who used to be a famous dacoit of Chambal along with contemporaries such as Daaku Madho Singh, Mohar Singh, Chhidda Makhan, is living with his family at Sheopur, near the Morena Commissionary.

== Portrayals in media ==
Daku Man Singh movie was made in 1971, directed by Babubhai Mistry. The cast included Dara Singh, Nishi, Shaikh Mukhtar, Jeevan, Shyam Kumar, and Guddi Maruti; the music was by Sardul Kwatra. It was produced by Time Life Films. However, the film, which showed the rural dacoits defying established power and serving the poor, was not strictly factual. Maan Singh also featured in the 2019 film, Sonchiriya, where he was played by Manoj Bajpayee.
