= The 65 Lakh Heist =

Book by Surender Mohan Pathak

- First English edition 2010
- Author: Surender Mohan Pathak
- Cover artist: Shelle Studio
- Language: English
- Genre: Crime Fiction
- Published: 1977 (Blaft Books)
- Publication place: India
- Media type: Print (Paperback)
- Pages: 216 (English)
- ISBN: 978-81-906056-5-6
- Followed by: Daylight Robbery

The 65 Lakh Heist is first English version (translated by Sudarshan Purohit) of a Surender Mohan Pathak book. The Hindi crime thriller (hi:पैंसठ लाख की डकैती, Painsatth Lakh ki Dacoity) was first published in 1977. It was the fourth book in the Vimal series.

The novel begun the trend of anti-heroism in Indian pulp fiction and was very controversial.

== Synopsis ==
Vimal is blackmailed into joining a conspiracy to break into the vault of Bharat Bank at Amritsar to loot 6.5 million rupees (65 lakh) inside it.

The conspiracy is the brainchild of Mayaram Bawa, a veteran vault-buster who is preparing to pull off the biggest heist of his career before he retires from his life of crime. For this purpose, he blackmails into submission an innocent-looking chauffeur called Vimal (whose actual name is Sardar Surender Singh Sohal), a criminal wanted for embezzlement in Allahabad (he did not do it), murder of Lady Shanta Gokuldas in Bombay (he had to do it to prevent rape and death of a girl), the robbery of gate money at Anna Stadium Madras (he was blackmailed into it). Bawa's deal is straight—say no and go to jail or say yes and get his share.

Bawa, with the help of Vimal and his partners Laab Singh (alias Matar Paneer) and Karamchand, successfully break into the vault and take away 6.5 million until an unfortunate circumstance forces them to flee the crime scene in a hurry.

Having got the money (mainly due to Vimal's brilliant efforts), Bawa shows his true colours, running away with the entire loot and ruthlessly killing the innocent Karamchand and the jovial Laabh Singh "Matar Paneer". Vimal narrowly escapes being killed due to his presence of mind, but needs to trace down Bawa. The trail brings him face to face with Harnam Singh Grewal, the top gun of Punjab underworld and a ruthless giant of a man. Grewal gets wind of the robbery and starts searching for Mayaram Bawa to snatch the loot from him.

Bawa takes refuge with his childhood friend Khanna, who is completely unaware of his criminal antecedents. Fearing capture by the police or being traced by Vimal (he is still unaware of Grewal's sinister designs), he leaves in a hurry. Grewal follows the trail to Khanna's residence, brutally murdering the man of the house and brutally torturing Mrs. Khanna.

In the meanwhile, Vimal manages to trace Mayaram Bawa to the residence of a young lady named Neelam in Chandigarh. He finally catches Bawa and punishes him by breaking his legs. Bawa's life is spared due to mercy of Neelam, who is now in love with Vimal (the two eventually get married).

The novel ends with Vimal entering the Khanna residence, where a bullet that hits him in the spine leaves Grewal paralysed neck down. Unfortunately, Grewal does not know where the money went as the only person who knew it was Mr. Khanna, who died after being brutal thrashed by him. With nothing left to gain, Vimal leaves the scene, leaving Grewal to the mercy of the humiliated Mrs. Khanna.
