= Nazroo Narejo =

Pakistani criminal

- Born: Nazar Ali Narejo; 1966; Sindh, Pakistan
- Died: July 11, 2015 (aged 48–49); Garhi Yaseen, Shikarpur
- Education: University of Sindh
- Known for: Dacoity, kidnapping, plundering
- Allegiance: Nazroo Group
- Reward amount: 20 million PKR

Nazar Ali Nazroo Narejo (Sindhi: نظِرُو ناريجو) was a notorious dacoit in Sindh, Pakistan. He was a symbol of terror for over two decades. He was held responsible and was charged with about 200 cases and was involved in plundering, highway robbery, kidnapping for ransom, murder and other crimes around the areas of Sindh and Punjab. The government announced a PKR 20 million reward for his capture.

== Early life ==
Nazroo Narejo studied sociology at the University of Sindh, Jamshoro in the 1970s. He was a decent and intellectual student but due to his father's encounter with the shadow feudal system he turned to crime and made a stand against feudalism. His father had a master's degree in sociology as well as LL.B.

== Death ==
Nazroo, along with his accomplices, was killed in the Garhi Yaseen area of Shaikarpur in an encounter with Tanveer Ahmed Tunio, SSP Sindh Police of the Sukkur Region. His brother-in-law Sarwar, also known as Saroo Narejo, and son Rab Rakhio Narejo were also killed during this operation. The operation claimed the lives of policemen Mujeeb Chachar and Haji Ismi Chachar.

== Timeline ==
In August 2013, a gang of dacoits led by Narejo fired rockets into the village of Mulla Ismail Khohro, in Khairpur, resulting in the deaths of two men and a little girl.

== See also ==
- Bawarij
