= 2000 Red Fort attack =

Terrorist attack in Delhi, India

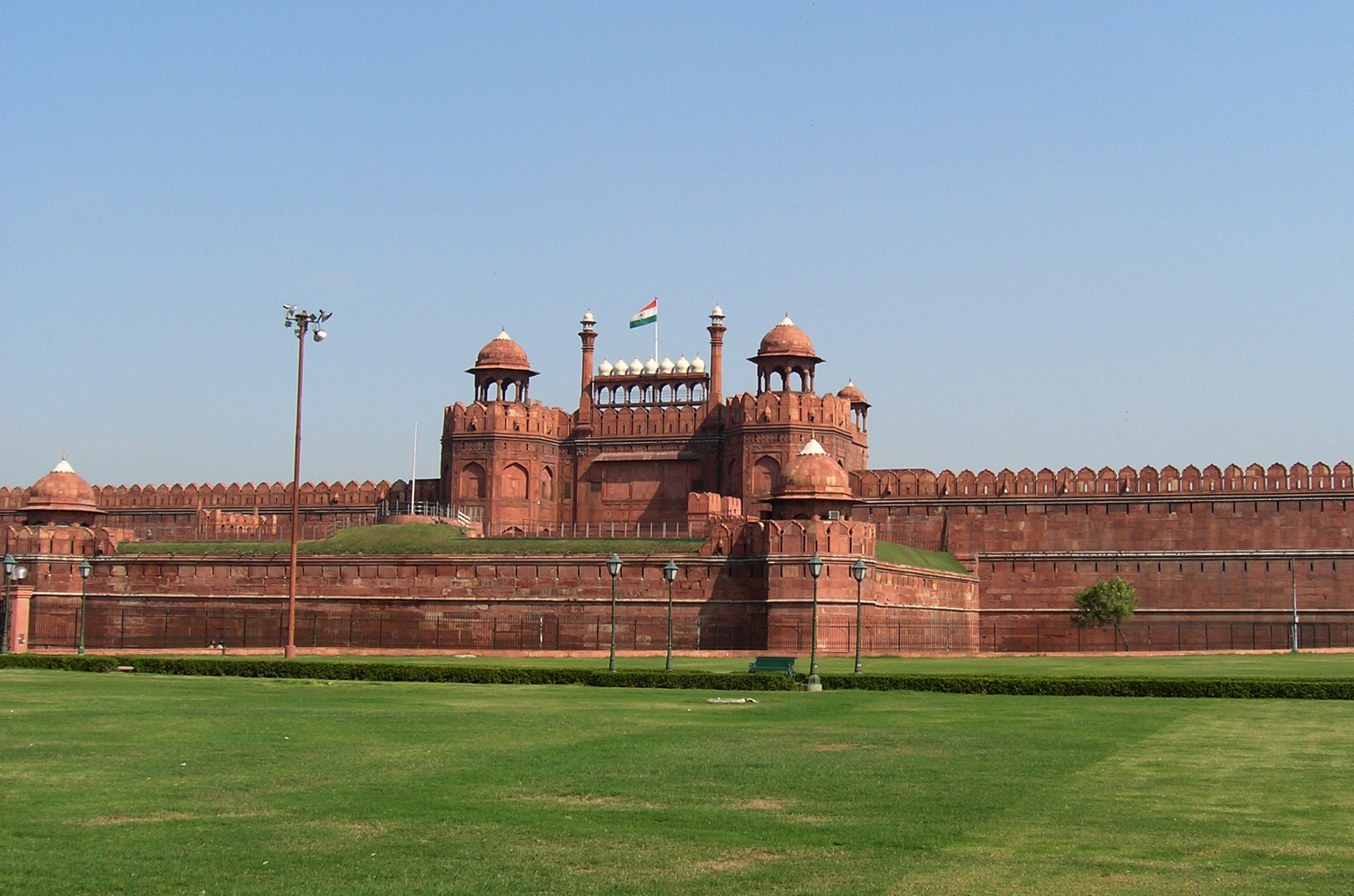
- Red Fort
- Location: Delhi, India
- Date: 22 December 2000 (UTC+5.5)
- Target: Red Fort
- Attack type: Shootings
- Deaths: 3
- Injuries: 1
- Perpetrator: Lashkar-e-Taiba
- Motive: Islamic terrorism

On 22 December 2000, a terrorist attack took place on the Red Fort in Delhi, India. It was carried out by the Pakistani terrorist group Lashkar-e-Taiba. It killed two soldiers and one civilian, in what was described by the media as an attempt to derail the India-Pakistan peace talks. The Red Fort is an extremely important Indian facility as it was a former residence of the Mughal emperors and now hosts the Prime Minister of India annually on 15 August which is the Indian Independence Day. It is also significant historically as it was taken over from British control and is an iconic site in India.

== Attack ==
On 22 December 2000, Starting at approximately 9:00 pm, two Lashkar-e-Taiba militants began firing indiscriminately and gunned down two army jawans belonging to the 7th Rajputana Rifles and a civilian security guard. The troops were placed at the fort due to its extreme importance within Indian history. The Red Fort used to house British Indian Army barracks; it was taken over by the Indian Army after Indian independence from the British rule. The intruders received returning fire from the Quick Reaction Team of the battalion. All the intruders escaped the Red Fort by scaling over the boundary wall on the rear side of the complex.

== Casualties ==
A total of three persons- Abdullah Thakur, a civilian sentry, Rifleman Uma Shankar Singh, and Naik Ashok Kumar- died as a result of the attack. Naik Ashok Kumar succumbed to his injuries in a Delhi hospital hours after the event occurred.

== Arrest of Lashkar-e-Taiba Operative ==
The attack was orchestrated by the Lashkar-e-Taiba. The Indian courts convicted six others in October 2005, with sentences of variety of lengths. In September 2007, due to the lack of evidence, the six other assailants were released. The Pakistan-based militant group, Lashkar-e-Taiba, took responsibility of the attacks. The attacks strained already tense relations between India and Pakistan.

Lashkar-e-Taiba terrorist Bilal Ahmed Kawa who planned and executed the terror attack was arrested in a joint operation by the Special Cell of the Delhi Police and the Gujarat ATS from the Delhi Airport on 10 January 2018. It took 17 years to arrest him. The 37-year-old was remanded to a Police Special Cell in Delhi for further probing. He was arrested on the basis of a tip-off received by Gujarat ATS regarding his movement from Srinagar to Delhi.

== See also ==
- List of terrorist incidents in India
