= Krishna Mishra =

Indian social activist and Yoga teacher

Krishna Guru Ji
- Occupations: Yoga teacher, Social Activist

Krishna Mishra (known as Krishna Guruji) is an indian international social activist, humanitarian and yoga instructor.

On international yoga day 2023 he performed yoga on the Vande Bharat train from Bhopal to Delhi. Previously he had performed on international yoga day with porter at the Nizamuddin railway station,

He has worked in different sectors of communities to spread the message of Humanity, in 2022 he organised a global prayer in Seattle for all religions of humanity and to advocate for world peace.

He transforms in a unique way the way different festivals connect to humans and transforms festivals into messages for youth.

He is also well known to be a healer, using touch therapy and divine astro-healing, a unique concept of self healing to nullify effects of planets.
