= Murder of Naina Sahni =

Political worker

Naina Sahni was the victim of the 1995 Tandoor murder case. On 2 July 1995, 29-year-old Sahni was killed by her husband Sushil Sharma, an Indian National Congress youth leader. Sushil Sharma was convicted for the murder by the Trial Court, Delhi High Court and Supreme Court of India. In October 2013, Sharma's death penalty was commuted to life imprisonment by the Supreme Court.

== Tandoor murder case ==
Sushil Sharma objected to his wife Naina Sahni's friendship with Matloob Karim. Matloob and Naina were classmates and fellow Congress workers. Sushil suspected Naina of having an extramarital relationship with Matloob. On the night of 2 July 1995, Sushil came home and saw Naina talking on the phone and consuming alcohol. Naina, on seeing Sushil, hung up. Sushil redialed the phone to find Matloob on the other end. Enraged, he fatally shot Naina. He took the body to a restaurant named Bagiya and tried to dispose it off with the restaurant manager, Keshav Kumar. The body was put in a tandoor (clay oven) to burn. Police arrested Keshav Kumar but Sharma managed to flee. He surrendered on 10 July 1995. The case also involved the use of DNA evidence to establish the identity of the victim.

The first autopsy was conducted at the Lady Hardinge Medical College and the cause of death was opined to be burn injuries. The second autopsy was ordered by the Lieutenant Governor of Delhi, and was conducted by a team of three doctors from three different hospitals headed by Tirath Das Dogra. They detected two bullets in the head and neck region, opined that the cause of death was due to firearm injuries. With that, the course of investigation changed and the actual story came to light. This case is a landmark citation for a fruitful second Autopsy. Delhi Police investigated the case and filed a Chargesheet on 27 July 1995 in a Sessions Court. On 7 November 2003, Sushil Sharma was sentenced to death and the restaurant manager, Keshav Kumar, was given seven years rigorous imprisonment.

Sharma appealed against the District Court Judgement in the Delhi High Court. The Court upheld the lower court's decision. In 2003, a city court sentenced him to death sentence, which was later upheld by the Delhi High Court in 2007. In 2013, the SC commuted his death sentence stating that there was "no evidence" of Sharma chopping his wife's body. On 8 October 2013, a three-judge bench of Chief Justice P. Sathasivam and Justices Ranjana Desai and Ranjan Gogoi of the Supreme Court upheld Sharma's conviction. However, the court commuted his death sentence to life imprisonment because Sharma doesn't have a criminal antecedent and it is not a crime against society, but it is a crime committed by the accused due to a strained personal relationship with his wife.

On 21 December 2018, Delhi High Court ordered the immediate release of Sushil Sharma. He walked out of jail in December 2018. He had spent nearly 23 years over there
