= Chambal (region) =

Chambal topography

The Chambal is a geographical and cultural region in north-central India. It lies along the Chambal and Yamuna river valleys, in southeastern Rajasthan, southwestern Uttar Pradesh and northern Madhya Pradesh.

== Etymology ==
The region derives its name from the Chambal River which flows through it.

== Geography ==
It covers the districts of Baran, Kota, Sawai Madhopur, Karauli, and Dholpur districts of Rajasthan, parts of Firozabad, Etawah, Auriya and Jalaun districts of UP, and Gwalior, Bhind, Morena and Sheopur districts of Madhya Pradesh. The region is covered by an estimated half a million hectares of badlands. It drains the northwest of the Central Vindhya Plateau and the southeastern part of the Aravalli Range. Southeastern tributaries like the Kali Sindh and Parbati begin at the extreme south of the Vindhyas and flow north in deep valleys, forming a triangular alluvial plain at elevation of 240-270 m. Afterwards the Banas, a northwestern tributary of the Chambal draining the Aravalli Range, joins the Chambal after crossing the hills near Sawai Madhopur in southeastern Rajasthan. The valley of the Chambal is wider near the confluence of the Kali Sindh and the Parbati and narrower after the confluence of the Banas. The Chambal extends to the ravines of the Choti Parbati in Rajasthan and the Kwari river in northeastern Madhya Pradesh. The Chambal badlands are part of the greater Vindhyan Basin.

== Ravines of Chambal ==
The ravines of Chambal were known in India as a region favored by the lawless. Many renowned dacoits, or bandits, such as Phoolan Devi maintained hideouts in the region. The reasons for dacoit activity in the Chambal valley are disputed. It may be feudal exploitation of those in the region prompted some to take to arms. The area was underdeveloped and poor, so banditry posed significant economic incentives. Yet many gangs operating in the valley were composed of higher-caste and wealthy individuals, suggesting that feudalism is only a partial explanation (Bhaduri, 1972; Khan, 1981; Jatar, 1980; Katare, 1972). Furthermore, traditional honour codes and blood feuds would drive some into criminality.

In Chambal, organized crime controlled much of the countryside from the time of the British Raj up to the early 2000s, with the police offering high rewards for the most notorious bandit chiefs. The criminals regularly targeted local businesses, though they preferred to kidnap wealthy people, and demand ransom from their relatives - cutting off fingers, noses, and ears to pressure them into paying high sums. Many dacoity also posed as social bandits toward the local poor, paying medical bills and funding weddings.One ex-dacoit described his own criminal past by claiming that "I was a rebel. I fought injustice." Following intense anti-banditry campaigns by the Indian Police, highway robbery was almost completely eradicated in the early 2000s. Nevertheless, Chambal is still commonly believed to be unsafe and bandit-infested by many Indians. One police officer noted that the fading of the dacoity was also due to social changes, as few young people were any longer willing to endure the harsh life as a highway robber in the countryside. Instead, they prefer to join crime groups in the city, where life is easier.
