= Thuggee and Dacoity Department =

Thagi and Dakaiti Department

Agency overview
- Formed: January 1835
- Dissolved: 1904
- Superseding agency: Department of Criminal Intelligence

Jurisdictional structure
- Legal jurisdiction: Company Raj and Native States (1835–1858): British Raj (1858–1863); Native States (1863– c. 1883); c. 1883–1904: Rajputana Agency; Central India Agency; Hyderabad State
- Governing body: Indian Political Department

Operational structure
- Headquarters: Jubbulpore (1835–1879); Shimla (1879–1904)
- Child agency: Special Branch (est. 1887)

Notables
- People: Sir William Henry Sleeman; Sir Donald Friell McLeod; Sir Edward Bradford

The Thuggee and Dacoity Department (Note: Contemporarily the Thagi and Dakaiti Department, though this is no longer the accepted Anglo-Indian spelling.) was an organ of the East India Company that was formally established in 1835 as the Thuggee Department during the British Anti-Thuggee Campaign of the 1830s, and later inherited by the British Raj. Led by William Henry Sleeman as General Superintendent of the Department from 1835 to 1855, it also prosecuted dacoity from 1839 and itinerant communities that were perceived to be engaged in crime. In 1863 it was abolished as a special agency in British territory and its operations were restricted to policing cross-border crime in Native States, later being confined to those in Rajputana, Central India, and Hyderabad.

The Thuggee and Dacoity Department played a key role in creating the environment surrounding the 1871 Criminal Tribes Act, with its archives being repeatedly cited to evidence the existence of 'criminal tribes'. In 1887, a Special Branch was set up to gather and collate political intelligence. The Thuggee and Dacoity Department was replaced with the Department of Criminal Intelligence in 1904.

== History ==
=== Anti-Thuggee Campaign (1829–1839) ===
==== Informal operations ====
In 1829–1830, the Government began to adopt a more centralised approach to tackling thuggee, which by 1815 had come to be seen as specialised and organised crime with the Thugs constituting a caste-like corporation. Early thuggee trials based solely on confessions had all been thrown out by the superior courts, though from 1826 the first Thugs were able to be convicted in the Saugor and Nerbudda courts due to Saugor and Nerbudda being established in 1818 as 'Non-Regulation Territories' outside of the East India Company's usual regulations. The sentences passed by the Political Agent for the Saugor and Nerbudda Territories went directly to the Government in Bengal, bypassing the Nizamat Adalat (the Company's supreme court). In an anonymous letter to the Calcutta Literary Gazette in October 1830, Assistant to the Agent at Jubbulpore Captain William Henry Sleeman presented thuggee as a vast organised cult, brutally murdering travellers out of fidelity to their Goddess and priesthood.

The letter left an impression on the Chief Secretary to the Government George Swinton, who requested a report from Francis Curwen Smith, the Agent for the Saugor and Nerbudda Territories, and Sleeman outlining plans for the suppression of thuggee. Governor-General Lord William Bentinck declined to establish a specific office for thuggee, though provided Sleeman with 50 barkandazes (Note: Guards armed with swords and shields or matchlocks.) to pursue and apprehend the gangs. Operations continued under Smith and Sleeman whereby approvers (the period term for informants) were sent out with detachments of troops to disinter bodies and point out their former associates, while Smith presided over the trials in his capacity as Commissioner for the Saugor and Nerbudda Territories. According to Kim A. Wagner, by 1831–1832 the Thuggee Department was "up and running in everything but name". In 1832, Lieutenant P.A. Reynolds, an Assistant Resident at Hyderabad, was appointed head of anti-thuggee operations in the Deccan while J.C. Wilson was assigned to the Doab, each being assigned 20 sepoys and 40 nujeeb militiamen. In 1833, Lieutenant Donald Friell McLeod was assigned to oversee operations in Rajputana, Malwa, and the lands surrounding Delhi. Reports on each thuggee case were combined into a vast register containing the names of every Thug that could be identified, including those mentioned in approver depositions.

Some British Residents protested the intrusions of Thug-hunting detachments as detrimental to relations with Native States, though Smith argued that the measures were necessary on the basis that native rulers gave their protection to known criminals out of a "besotted and ignorant point of honour". The Court of Directors sanctioned the measures in 1832, but only in newly acquired territories and Native States, on the basis that these rulers profited from harbouring Thugs. In 1833, the Government ordered Smith to only convict reputed Thugs if there was circumstantial evidence supporting the approver testimonies. By the time operations were centralised in 1835, according to Mike Dash, they were already widely referred to in Jubbulpore as the "Thuggee Department".

==== Formalised department ====
In 1834, Smith began to call for a central agency for the suppression of thuggee that would station officials in more territories. Backed by an official report, the Government established the Thuggee Department in January 1835 and appointed Sleeman 'General Superintendent of the operations for the suppression of Thuggee' in March, after Smith declined the post. By this point, the Thuggee Department had a staff of seven assistants and nearly 300 nujeebs under its command. Most Indians' experience of the Department was through other Indians, such as police or civil service officials, sepoys, and approvers. Though omitted from English press reports, Thug-hunting expeditions were also headed by Munshis, and Subedar-Major Rustum Khan, for instance, commanded a detachment of troops in Saugor from 1830–1837 and was continually active in anti-thuggee operations. The Government published notices on the progression of the campaign in the Calcutta Gazette (the government paper) and the Thuggee Department fed the press sensational details of the Thugs' activities and their measures against them in order to argue for more resources.

Thuggee Department officers extensively recorded Thug beliefs, slang, and superstition, which served to authenticate the difference between hereditary cult-oriented criminals and casual offenders, legitimising the special measures adopted for prosecution. Following the discovery of 'River-Thugs' in 1836, whose modus operandi left very little circumstantial evidence, Sleeman argued for new legislation. Act XXX of 1836 was passed, making simply belonging to a thuggee gang punishable with life imprisonment. The act was passed too late to have any real impact on the main campaign, since the original gangs had practically ceased to exist by this point, though the term 'Thug' was not defined and thereafter became a legal umbrella-term used to prosecute child trafficking (Megpunna-Thugs) and non-lethal poisoners (Datura-Thugs), as well as to prosecute any communities that could be labelled as such. Thuggee Department assistants began to arrest bands of religious mendicants, believing that they too would be found guilty of systematic highway murder. From 1836–1839, they reported on Tin Nami, Gosain, Bairagi, Jogi, Kan Phuttie, Thori, and, from Cuttack, Panda Brahmin Thugs. The Department retreated from efforts to apply anti-thuggee legislation to the mendicant bands after they failed to substantiate charges and, in one case, had clashed with the local population. Sleeman reminded his officers in April that if they were morally satisfied that the prisoner had belonged to a gang of Thugs but there was not enough evidence to convict them, then it was their duty to detain them indefinitely under Regulation VIII of 1818.

Dacoity was added to the Department's responsibilities that same year, with the offices of Commissioner for the Suppression of Dacoity and General Superintendent for the Suppression of Thuggee formally united on 12 February 1839, and Sleeman declared thuggee to have been effectively eradicated as an organisation, marking the end of the Anti-Thuggee Campaign. As of 1840, 3,869 Thugs were estimated to have been hanged, 1,564 sentenced to deportation, 933 imprisoned for life, and 86 acquitted while 56 became approvers and 208 died before trial. Between c. 1826 and 1841, thuggee trials had a conviction rate of 98.9%.

=== Anti-dacoity campaign, Moghia operations, and Criminal Tribes ===
In the 1840s the Thuggee and Dacoity Department shifted its focus to communities of "hereditary dacoits", with Act XXIV of 1843 extending the provisions of the 1836 Thuggee Act to "professional Dacoits". Historian Radhika Singha considers the vast amount of material generated by the Thuggee and Dacoity Department on the hereditary nature of Thugs and Dacoits to, in reality, disguise the failure of the colonial regime to set up mechanisms of policing and prosecution capable of tying the specific offense to the individual offender. Act XI of 1848 prescribed seven years' imprisonment for individuals belonging to "any wandering gang of persons, associated for the purposes of theft or robbery, not being a gang of thugs or Dacoits". Following the recommendations of the 1860 Indian Police Commission, the Thuggee and Dacoity Department was abolished as a special agency in British territory in 1863 and its operations were restricted to policing cross-border crime in Native States, whereafter its effectiveness became crucially dependent on the cooperation of darbars. From c. 1883, its operations were confined to the Native States of Rajputana, Central India, and Hyderabad.

After the Rebellion of 1857–1858, the first reports on Moghia criminality began to emerge from Thuggee and Dacoity Department officer Edward Bradford, who would later head the Department. The Moghia tribes belonged to a tradition of "watchman-communities" (chaukīdārs), alongside tribes of Meenas, Kolis, Gurjars, and Bhils, that were retained by rural landholders to police and protect villages, though they also plundered to raise money for, or to intimidate the enemies of, their patrons. (Note: Today, the Moghia are a Scheduled Tribe present in the states of Chhattisgarh, Madhya Pradesh, and Maharashtra.) They were employed by village communities, landholders, heads of state, and also increasingly by British officers. However, Political Agents and Thuggee and Dacoity Department officers would later report from 1861 onwards a lack of violent crime in Moghia communities and that Moghia populations were small in number and dwindling. Initially they were policed from 1861 under the Gwalior Code, a joint venture with the British Council of Regency and Maharaja Jayajirao Scindia that placed them under the supervision of landholders and restricted their movement. Amid continuous failures to enforce the Gwalior Code, the Agents in Rajputana and Central India launched the Moghia Commission in 1878, which saw the Thuggee and Dacoity Department take a direct role in resettling the Moghias en masse and controlling them through the use of absentee passes, roll calls, and approvers. Using Sleeman's methodology set out in his 1849 Report on Budhuk alias Bagree dacoits, Bauris, Vaghris, and Budhuks were classified as "Moghias known by region-specific names" and subjected to special policing measures.

The archives of the Thuggee and Dacoity Department were repeatedly cited to evidence the existence of criminal tribes and the Department was a key player in presenting a crime plague perpetrated by itinerant and semi-nomadic communities. This culminated in the 1871 Criminal Tribes Act (CTA), with the Department tasked with controlling its implementation for a time. In 1879, the General Superintendent's headquarters were transferred from Jubbulpore to Shimla. In 1887, a Special Branch of the Thuggee and Dacoity Department was set up under General Superintendent Philip Durham Henderson to collect and collate intelligence on political groups and movements, such as Indian nationalist groups and a major review of cow protection movements in 1893.

According to an 1891 government document setting out the inner workings of the Department, its operations were at the time limited to assisting Native States in suppressing dacoity and "poisoning for plunder", keeping records of cases of and persons involved in dacoity and poisoning for plunder, organising and carrying out the recognition, extradition, and punishment of "wandering criminals" in Native States, organising special measures for the suppression of dacoity in Native States where the Darbar had been found "incompetent", and supervising the policing arrangements of any minor Native States found "unable to deal with crime in their territories". The document also elaborates on duties assigned to the Department for the "control and settlement of Moghias and other Crimınal Tribes" and states that funds obtained from Native States for Moghia operations were to be added to its budget. Regarding the implementation of the CTA, the documents outlines how Criminal Tribes were to have their mounts confiscated, with the proceeds to be spent on farming equipment, as well as any arms. Members of the tribes were also not allowed to leave the established settlements unless they had a pass issued by, depending on the period of leave requested, the Headman of the village or up to the head of the district.

As officers invested with authority in the Department, the document lists the Resident at Hyderabad and the Agents to the Governor-General for Rajputana and Central India, the General Superintendent of Operations for the Suppression of Thuggee and Dacoity, all Political Agents in Rajputana and Central India, and the Assistant General Superintendents at Government Headquarters, Hyderabad, Ajmer, and Indore.

The 1902–1903 Indian Police Commission described the operations of the Thuggee and Dacoity Department as "now too spasmodic and too limited to be effective" and recommended that it be superseded by a central agency. The report also described it as, to some extent, a central office of criminal intelligence for the whole of India. In 1904, the Thuggee and Dacoity Department was replaced with the Department of Criminal Intelligence. As late as the 1940s, the Intelligence Bureau in Shimla was referred to by rickshaw wallahs as the 'Thagi Daftar' ('Thuggee Office').

== List of General Superintendents ==
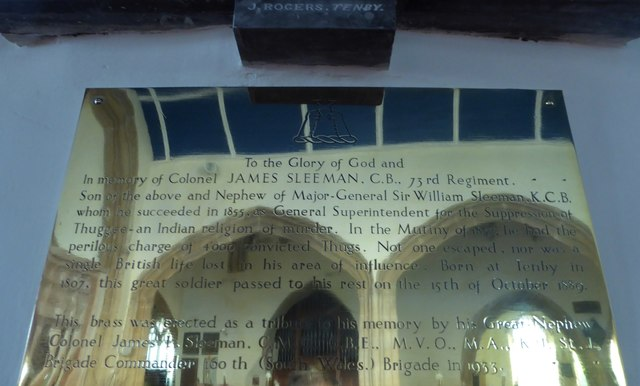
Plaque erected in 1933 in memory of James Sleeman by James L. Sleeman (W. H. Sleeman's nephew and grandson respectively)

- Sir William Henry Sleeman (1835–1855)
- James Sleeman (1855–)
- Charles Hervey (c. 1860s–1874)
- Sir Edward Bradford, 1st Baronet (1874–)
- Philip Durham Henderson (1878–1892)
- Sir Alfred Lethbridge (1892–1896)
- Sir Charles Stuart Bayley (1896–)

== Departmental reports ==
- Sleeman, W. H. (1839). A report on the system of Megpunnaism, or the murder of indigent parents for their young children (who are sold as slaves) as it prevails in the Delhie territories, and the native states of Rajpootana, Ulwar and Bhurtpore. Serampore Press.
- ——— (1840). Report on the depredations committed by the Thug gangs of upper and central India, from the cold season of 1836-37, down to their gradual suppression, under the operation of the measures adopted against them by the supreme government, in the year 1839. Calcutta: G. H. Huttman, Bengal Military Orphan Press.
- ——— (1849). Report on Budhuk alias Bagree dacoits and other gang robbers by hereditary profession and on the measures adopted by the Government of India for their suppression. Calcutta: Bengal Military Orphan Press.
- Sleeman, James (1857). Statement showing the number of criminals arrested and disposed of by officers of the Thuggee Department during 1856 (Report). Jubbulpore: General Superintendent's Office. In Nayar, Pramod K., ed. (2023). The Imperial Archives. From Discovery to the Civilisational Mission: English Writings on India. Volume VI: Thugs and Dacoits. New Delhi: Bloomsbury Academic. pp. 427–434. ISBN 978-939-470-191-5.
- Hervey, Charles (1858). Reports and returns relating to the crimes of Thuggee and Dacoity; Correspondence relating to Act no. XXIX of 1850; Papers on the subject of confessions; With reports on and list of wandering tribes (PDF) (Report). Selections from the records of the Bombay government in the police branch. Byculla: Education Society's Press.
- Hervey, Charles (1868). Report on the crime of Thuggee by means of poisons in British territory for the years 1864, 1865, and 1866 (PDF) (Report). Delhi: General Superintendent's Office Press.
- Bradford, E. R. C. (1877). Statements of the crime of Dacoity in British Territory for the year 1875 (Report). Shimla: Government Central Branch Press.

=== Selected works ===
- Hervey, Charles (1892). Some Records of Crime: Being the Diary of a Year, Official and Particular, of an Officer of the Thuggee and Dacoitie Police. Vol. 1. London: Samston, Low, Marston & Company.
- Hervey, Charles (1892). Some Records of Crime: Being the Diary of a Year, Official and Particular, of an Officer of the Thuggee and Dacoitie Police. Vol. 2. London: Samston, Low, Marston & Company.

== Bibliography ==
- Bayly, C. A. (1996). Empire and Information: Intelligence Gathering and Social Communication in India, 1780–1870. Cambridge University Press. ISBN 978-052-166-360-1.
- Brown, Mark (2003). "Ethnology and Colonial Administration in Nineteenth-Century British India: The Question of Native Crime and Criminality". The British Journal for the History of Science. 36 (2): 210–219. JSTOR 4028233.
- Brown, Mark (2014). Penal Power and Colonial Rule. Abingdon; New York: Routledge. ISBN 978-113-894-481-7.
- Dash, Mike (2005). Thug: The True Story of India's Murderous Cult. London: Granta. ISBN 978-1-86207-846-8.
- Fhlathúin, Máire ní (2004). "The Campaign against Thugs in the Bengal Press of the 1830s". Victorian Periodicals Review. 37 (2): 124–140. JSTOR 20084002.
- Griffiths, Percival (1971). "The Thagi and Dakaiti Department". The History of the Indian Police. London; Bombay: Ernest Benn; Allied Publishers. pp. 121–136.
- Government of India (1891). Rules for the Working of the Thagi and Dakaiti Department (PDF) (Report). Shimla: Government Central Printing Office.
- Iftikhar-ul-Awwal, A. Z. M. (1990). "Anti-Dacoity Drive in Mid-Nineteenth Century Bengal". Journal of the Asiatic Society of Bangladesh. 35 (1): 89–105.
- Indian Police Commission (1903). Report of the Indian Police Commission, 1902–03 (Report). Shimla: Government Central Printing Office.
- Lloyd, Tom (2006). "Acting in the "theatre of Anarchy": The "anti-thug campaign" and elaborations of colonial rule in early nineteenth-century India" (PDF). Edinburgh Papers in South Asian Studies (19): 1–50. ISBN 978-190-079-520-3.
- Lloyd, Tom (2008). "Thuggee, marginality and the state effect in colonial India, circa 1770–1840". The Indian Economic and Social History Review. 45 (2): 201–237.
- Piliavsky, Anastasia (2013). "The Moghia Menace, or the Watch Over Watchmen In British India". Modern Asian Studies. 47 (3): 751–779. JSTOR 24494166.
- Piliavsky, Anastasia (2015). "The "Criminal Tribe" in India before the British". Comparative Studies in Society and History. 57 (2): 323–354.
- Robb, Peter (1986). "The Challenge of Gau Mata: British Policy and Religious Change in India, 1880-1916". Modern Asian Studies. 20 (2): 285–319. JSTOR 312577.
- Singha, Radhika (1998). A Despotism of Law: Crime and Justice in Early Colonial India. Delhi: Oxford University Press. ISBN 978-019-564-049-6.
- Van Woerkens, Martine (2002). The Strangled Traveler: Colonial Imaginings and the Thugs of India. Translated by Tihanyi, Catherine. Chicago, London: University of Chicago Press. ISBN 978-022-685-086-3. Originally published in 1995 as Le voyageur étranglé: L'Inde des Thugs, le colonialisme et l'imaginaire (in French).
- Wagner, Kim A. (2007). Thuggee: Banditry and the British in Early Nineteenth-Century India. New York: Palgrave Macmillan. ISBN 978-0-230-59020-5.
