= Thuggee =

Indian gangs of robbers and murderers

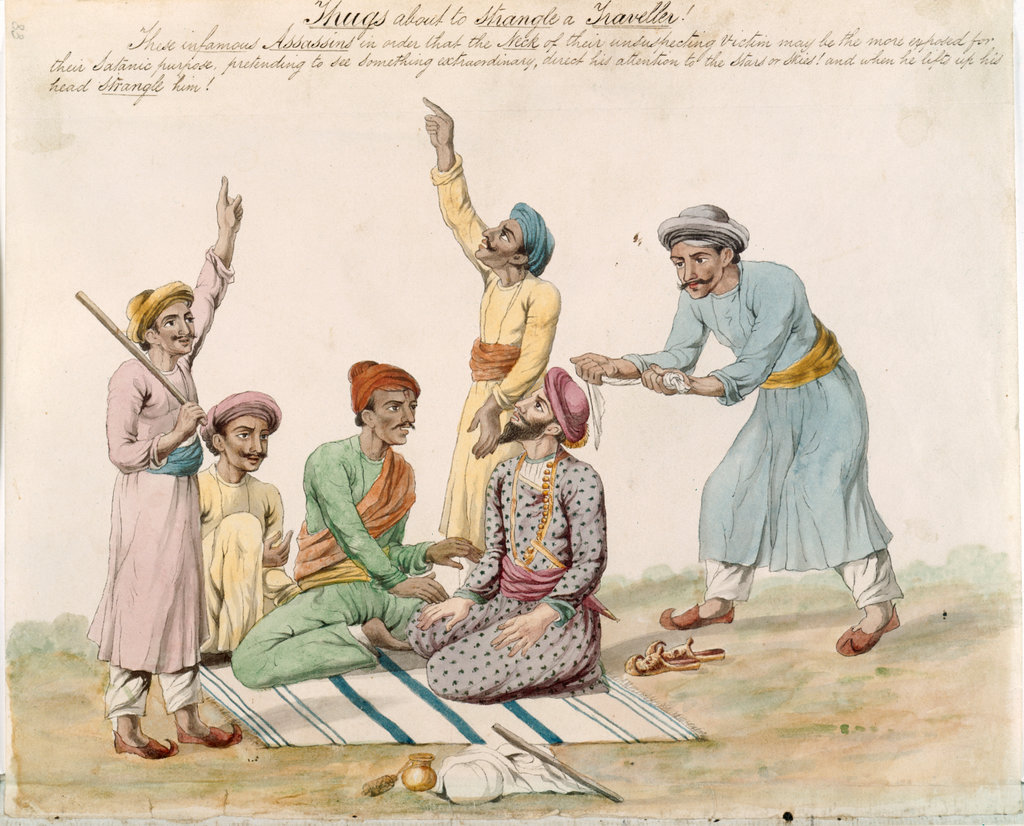
- Depiction of Thugs about to strangle a traveller, c. 1837 (Note: This illustration is part of a collection of watercolour sketches made by an Indian artist under the direction of Captain James Paton, the Assistant Resident at Lucknow in charge of the Anti-Thuggee Campaign in Oudh from the mid-1830s, and featured in his unpublished manuscript entitled Collections on Thuggee and Dacoitee. The handwritten caption reads: "Thugs about to strangle a traveller! These infamous Assassins in order that the Neck of their unsuspecting victim may be the more exposed for their Satanic purpose, pretending to see something extraordinary, direct his attention to the stars or skies! and when he lifts up his head strangle him!" Other illustrations include watercolours of a traveller being pulled from his horse and a man being murdered as he slept, as well as a series of black-and-white portraits of Paton's approvers. Paton claimed the illustrations were authentic, writing in one caption: "This sketch was shown by me to three Thug assassin leaders, who all declared it to be a very faithful depiction".)
- Duration: Possibly 17th or 18th centuries – 1840s
- Location: Indian subcontinent, mainly central India
- Cause: Socioeconomic factors, the decline of the Mughal Empire and expansion of British rule
- Motive: Robbery, alleged human sacrifice
- Target: Travellers
- Deaths: Hundreds exhumed Estimated 50,000–100,000 total (Note: Colonial-era estimates of the number of people killed by thuggee vary considerably. In Richard Sherwood's 1816 article, he estimated no more than a few hundred deaths a year while the Samachar Darpan in 1833 estimated a monthly average of eight hundred. In his 1920 book Thug: Or a Million Murders, James L. Sleeman (William Henry Sleeman's grandson) claimed that around 40,000 people a year were killed by thuggee. According to the historian Mike Dash, James Sleeman then arbitrarily revised his total estimate down from an implied 20 million to one million.)
- Convictions: 1,368 (1826–1835); 4,224 (1826–1847)

Thuggee (Note: UK: /θʌˈɡiː/ thuh-GHEE, US: /ˈθʌɡi/ THUH-ghee; Hindustani: ठगी or ٿهگی, pronounced [ʈʰə.ɡiː]) was a phenomenon of highway robbery in the Indian subcontinent that saw gangs of Thugs murder and rob travellers, often by strangling. During the British colonial era, thuggee was represented and popularised as a secret pan-Indian fraternity of ritual stranglers with ancient origins, motivated by fanaticism and bloodlust. This portrayal has come under intense scholarly criticism beginning in the 1950s, with scholars generally contesting the significance of religion to thuggee and viewing the Thugs as more or less ordinary criminals, or thuggee as a type of banditry. There is a general consensus among contemporary historians against the colonial-era representation.

The thuggee phenomenon came to prominence in the early 19th century, during the expansion of East India Company rule in India. In the 1830s, colonial administrator William Henry Sleeman led a policing campaign against thuggee, supported by legal developments that facilitated convictions. In 1835, the Thuggee Department of the Company was formally established to apprehend and prosecute the gangs. Sleeman authored works on thuggee and, together with his colleagues, recorded interviews with approvers (Note: The period term for informants.) which underpinned the colonial-era representation and constitute the vast majority of sources on the phenomenon. Thuggee was portrayed by the colonial authorities as "hereditary criminality" and the campaign served as a precedent for the 1871 Criminal Tribes Act that criminalised itinerant communities.

Contemporary scholars generally place the Thugs in the context of chaos and disruption amidst the decline of the Mughal Empire that was exacerbated by the expansion of British rule. The historical revisionism has also highlighted the variety of individuals arrested over the course of the campaign. A theory that has gained traction among historians views the phenomenon as resulting from a decline in the military labour market brought about by the British conquest and the East India Company's disbandment of native standing armies. The theory holds that some disbanded soldiers and itinerant mercenary bands turned to highway robbery as the market contracted. Scholars have variously described the 19th-century representation as an invention or distortion of the Company regime that legitimised colonial rule and saw the Company extend its control over its Indian subjects.

Following the publication of the 1839 novel Confessions of a Thug, thuggee became a Victorian sensation. The Thugs have generally been portrayed in fiction as Orientalist antagonists, featuring in novels such as The Wandering Jew (1844), Emilio Salgari's Sandokan series, and The Deceivers (1952). Notable depictions in film have included Gunga Din (1939), Indiana Jones and the Temple of Doom (1984), and Thugs of Hindostan (2018).

== Etymology and nomenclature ==
Thug (Hindustani: ठग; ٹھگ) translates to 'cheat' or 'swindler' and is derived from the Sanskrit word स्थग (sthaga) meaning 'to cover' or 'to conceal'. The earliest generally accepted use of the word dates to 1350. It was sometimes used in precolonial India, in the same sense as the later British usage, to refer to highway robbers that deceived and murdered their victims. This was not the only meaning of the term, with its literal interpretation not necessarily connoting an association with violence. In 1820, a British magistrate stated in his report that in the Western Provinces (Note: The division of Bareilly and Benares.) "the word Thug is a local cant term and consequently little understood in any uniform way".

The English word thug is a loanword from the same roots. The word phansigar (फाँसीगार; پھانسی گار) literally meaning 'strangler', was used interchangeably with thug during the 19th century and tended to be the term used in the Madras Presidency. Thuggee refers to the practice of Thugs and the crime itself.

== History ==
=== Possible precolonial accounts ===
In the 7th century, the Chinese monk Xuanzang was attacked by pirates on the Ganges during his travels across India and narrowly escaped being sacrificed to Durga. On another occasion, Xuanzang was told while passing a temple on the way to Pataliputra that no foreigner who entered it ever came out again. The 19th-century archaeologist Alexander Cunningham claimed to have identified the temple and presented this as an early account of thuggee. Kim A. Wagner asserts the view that, by this rationale, every account of banditry and human sacrifice in ancient India could be linked to the Thugs of the 19th century. According to a 14th-century chronicle by Ziauddin Barani, Sultan Jalal-ud-Din Khalji deported 1,000 arrested "thags" from Delhi to Bengal in 1290; however the chronicle makes no mention of what they were arrested for. The 15th–16th century poet Surdas wrote of a "thag" luring a pilgrim with sweets and wine and then murdering and robbing them.

Following Jean de Thévenot's travels across India in 1666–1667, he wrote of the "cunningest Robbers in the World" operating in the Delhi area that strangled their victims with a running noose and used attractive women to lure travellers. In 1672, the Mughal emperor Aurangzeb issued a farman setting out a punishment for stranglers, including those that were "habituated to the work" or were notorious for it among the local population. John Fryer wrote of his experience witnessing the execution of fifteen members of a bandit gang in 1675, near Surat, that had strangled and robbed passing travellers using a cotton bowstring. Around 1680, an Indian news-writer for the Waqa'i Ajmer referred to "highway robbers known in Hindi as thags" in Rajputana. In 1785, James Forbes recounted how an Indian acquaintance had witnessed the arrest of several men that belonged to a tribe he referred to as phanseegurs, describing how they would deceive and strangle travellers. A 1797 Gwalior State tax list lists 318 houses as belonging to Thugs, who were subjected to a soldier tax. The list was obtained by a British official and covers 20 villages across the parganas of Parihara and Sursae. (Note: The tax list was obtained in 1834 by William Henry Sleeman, the colonial administrator later put in charge of the British Anti-Thuggee Campaign, and published as 'Appendix O' in his 1836 book Ramaseeana.)

=== Colonial era ===
==== Etawah crisis (1809–1811) ====
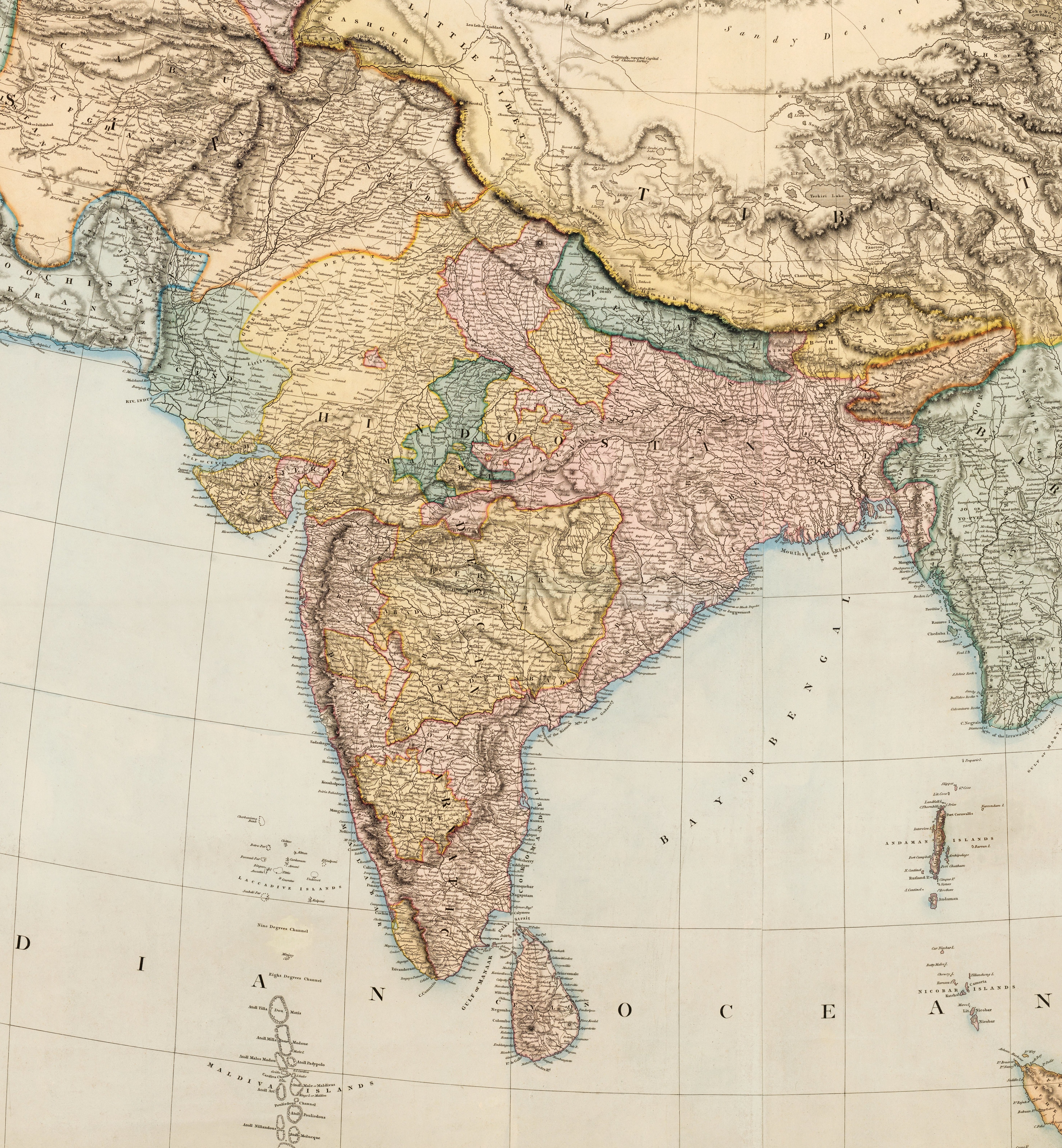
Map of India under Company rule in 1827, following the 1817–1819 Third Anglo-Maratha War

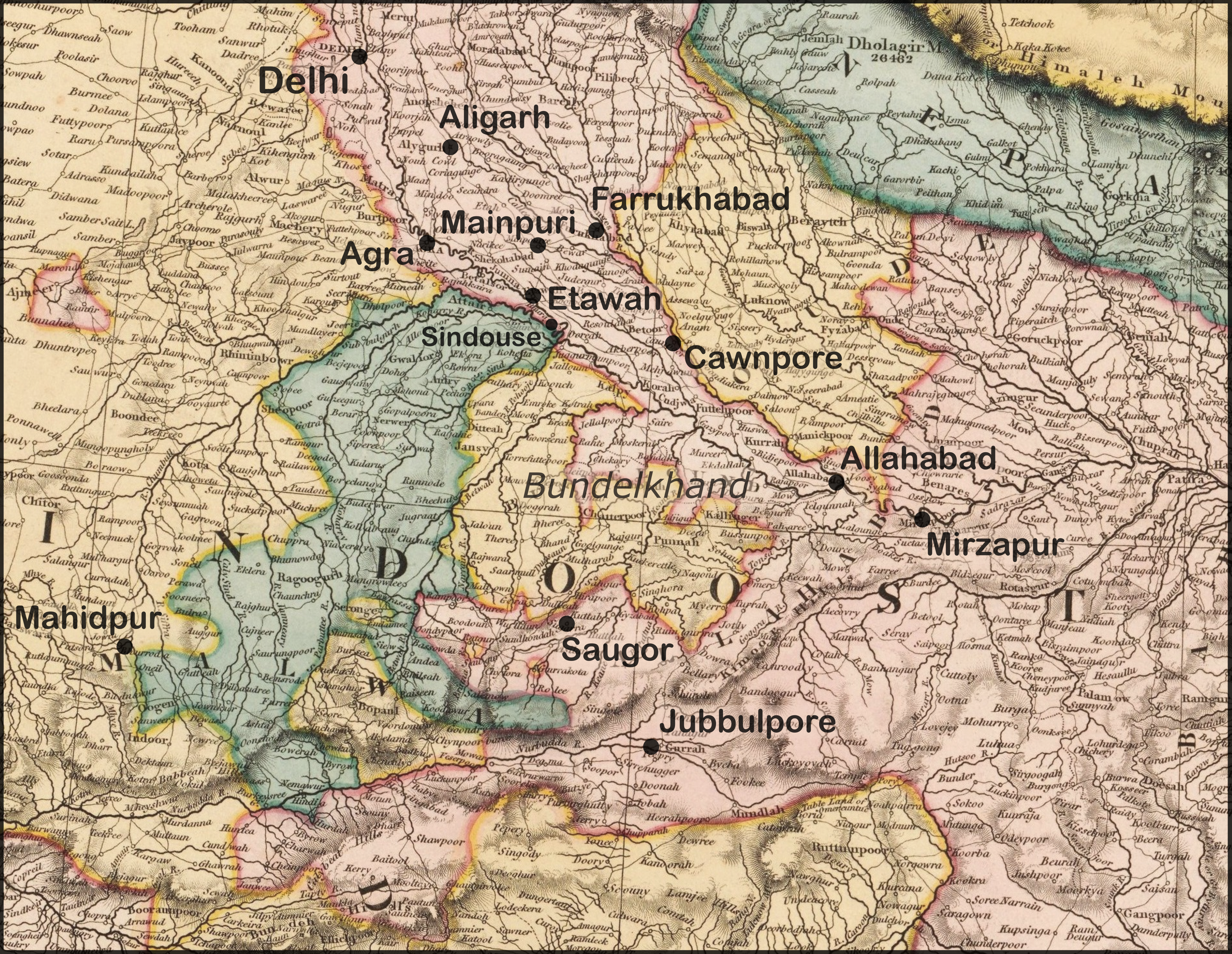
Enlarged view of northern and central India

The British colonial authorities first encountered what they would come to refer to as thuggee in Southern India in 1807 and in Northern India in 1809. In April 1809, ten bodies were discovered in a well in the Etawah district (newly ceded in 1801), with the Magistrate of Etawah, James Law, ordered to investigate the killings. The magistrates of the neighbouring Aligarh and Farrukhabad districts were brought in to assist after two developments: the discovery of four strangled native soldiers in July and Law's inquiries proving unsuccessful. In November, Law's assistant made the first officially recorded reference to "Tugs [sic]", describing them as "a set of people ... who have from time immemorial carried on their abominable and lamentable practices" in secret.

Following the discovery of two strangled travellers in December and the initiation of a more thorough investigation, Law wrote: "It is presumed that the murdered persons were travellers and fell victims to that detestable race of monsters called T,ugs [sic] ... they are so strongly leagued together, that scarcely an instance has ever been known of their having betrayed each other's secrets." More bodies were discovered throughout December and early 1810, in the midst of which Law was removed from his post. When questioned by an investigation in February, local zamindars reported that the perpetrators were suspected to be "Thugs".

Between 1808 and 1809, a total of 67 bodies were discovered in wells and along the highways of Etawah, with a further 11 discovered in early 1810 between Mainpuri and Agra. Law's replacement, Thomas Perry, offered a large reward of ₨ 1,000 for information leading to the arrest of the perpetrators. After eight suspected Thugs were arrested in March 1810, a young member of the gang, Ghulam Hussain, agreed to testify in return for a pardon and claimed that there were some 1,500 Thugs based in Etawah. Hussain stated that he had been adopted by the gang as a child after they had murdered his father and uncle. The remaining prisoners initially admitted to murdering travellers over many years. At the trial in Mainpuri in November, he demonstrated for the court how the gang strangled their victims, though the trial descended into a farce as Hussain repeatedly revised his testimony regarding the extent of his involvement with the gang. He ultimately claimed to have been on five expeditions, witnessing 95 murders. However, the court rejected his testimony due to repeated perjury and it was later deemed inadmissible to try him for the murders he had confessed to participating in. Perry was forced to release the suspects and was later admonished by the Nizamat Adalat (the East India Company's supreme court) for holding 162 suspected Thugs without due evidence.

==== 1810s and 1820s ====
Regulation VI of 1810 first referred to Thugs as a distinct criminal category, alongside Dacoits, Cozauks, and Buddecks. (Note: Cozauks, or kazaks, were mounted bandits, while Buddecks, also Budhuks or Badhaks, were bands of hunters and trappers in the margins of forests and an alleged class of thieves operating in the Oudh borderlands.) That same year, the Superintendent of Police for the Western Provinces was established to apprehend Dacoits, Cozauks, and, especially, Thugs. Though many individuals were convicted and sentenced to death by the circuit courts, the Nizamat Adalat ultimately dismissed all such cases because they relied solely on the confessions of suspected Thugs. (Note: According to Wagner, the judges dismissed the cases not because they doubted that Thugs existed but to counteract the influence of Muslim law officers that they regarded as relying too much on "spurious" confessions. The testimony of criminals was also not theoretically admissible under Islamic law.) In July 1812, Nathaniel J. Halhed (Note: Assistant to the Superintendent of Police for the Western Provinces and nephew of the Orientalist Nathaniel Brassey Halhed. Halhed had previously been given charge of 15 of the most troublesome thanas in Aligarh in 1810, which saw him lay siege to a fort later that year in an attempt to apprehend a noted kazak protected by the local zamindar. He was assigned to the Superintendent for the Western Provinces in Agra in 1811 and, employing the same heavy-handed tactics, spent the first half of 1812 skirmishing with dacoits in the Scindia-ruled borderlands, with Scindia's permission.) was tasked with introducing British law and order into the thana of Sindouse (located in the pargana of Parihara, southernmost Etawah), an area where local zamindars were allegedly protecting Thugs. Halhed visited the area with a military escort in October and, after ordering the surrounding villages to disarm, his party was ambushed by the villagers, in the course of which a British officer was killed. In response, the village of Murnae was razed the following month. (Note: According to Kim A. Wagner, this happened due to misinterpretations based on mutual distrust between Halhed and the villagers, which escalated.) The operation caused the Thugs to disperse into neighbouring Maratha territory. In a December report, Halhed rejected portrayals of the Thugs as a "secret society similar to the Illuminati", asserting that they were "no more than a species of robber" who murdered their victims and felt no dishonour in their profession.

Following the 1812 operation, successive Superintendents of Police for the Western Provinces claimed in their reports that thuggee activity had decreased in Etawah, Aligarh, and Cawnpore in the central Doab and simultaneously increased in Allahabad and Bundelkhand, migrating southwards and eastwards. In his yearly report for 1815, Superintendent John Shakespeare remarked that "much scepticism still prevails regarding the existence of any distinct class of people who are designated T'hegs [sic]", though he himself held no doubt that there were "regular societies" of Thugs, who he characterised as robbers. In his five classes of Thugs, Shakespeare included Bairagi and Gosain mendicants who drugged and robbed travellers.

Regulation VIII of 1818 effectively allowed notorious Dacoits to be held indefinitely, with Regulation III of 1819 extending its provisions to also apply to Thugs. In the 1820s, the colonial authorities began handing captured Thugs over to local rulers and chiefs to circumvent the British colonial legal system and convict them by proxy. The first Thugs were convicted in Saugor in 1826, when two were sentenced to be hanged and a further 29 were sentenced to transportation for life. This was possible because Saugor and Nerbudda had been designated as Non-Regulation Territories in 1818, meaning that the Agent at Saugor could operate outside the usual Company regulations with virtually unlimited powers. In 1829 in the Bombay Presidency, two Thugs were sentenced to hanging, six to transportation, and one to life imprisonment for the murder of six men carrying ₨ 100,000 of valuables in February. (Note: According to Mike Dash, this would have had a value equivalent to £1.5 million in 2004.)

==== Centralised campaign (1829–1839) ====
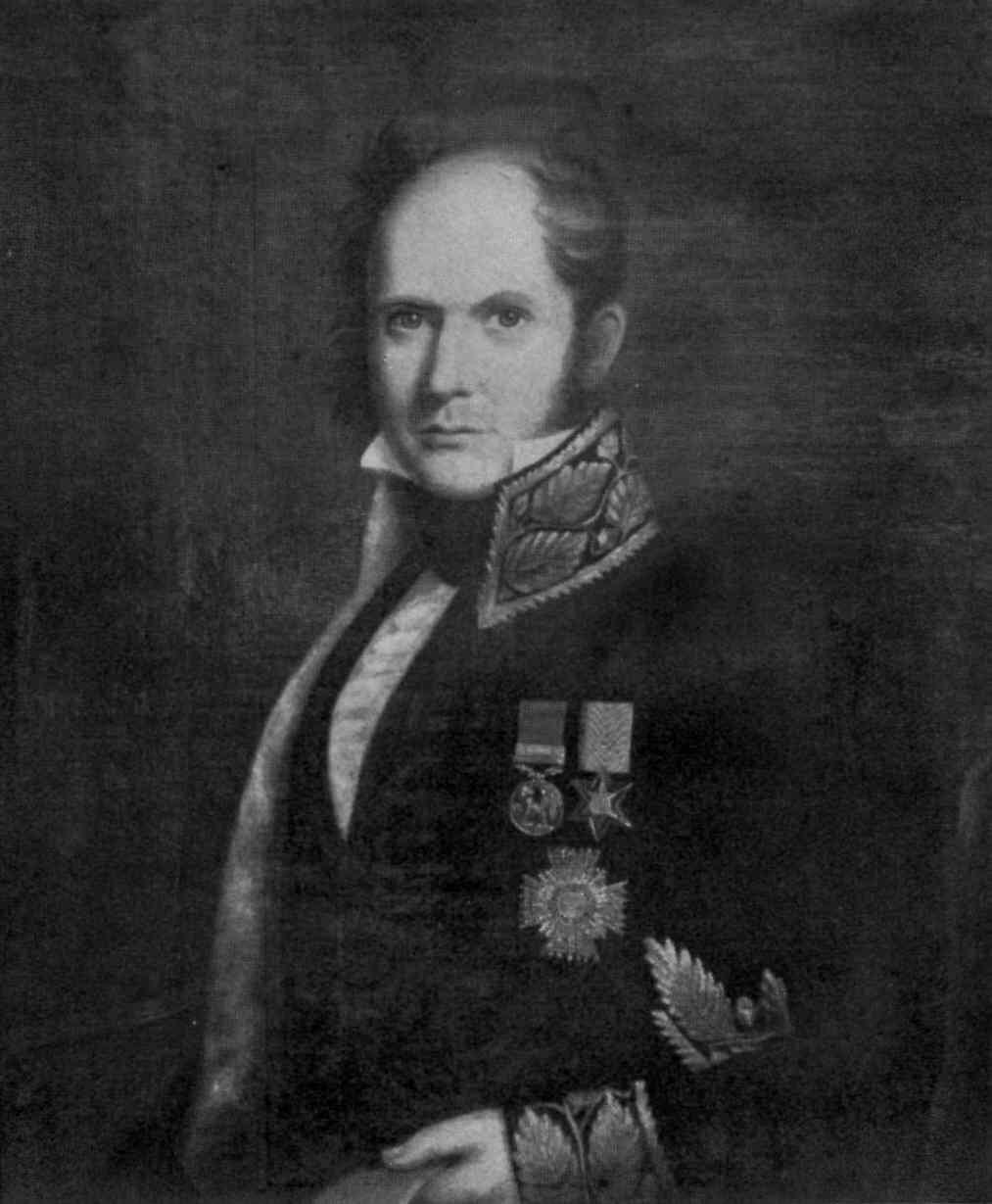
William Henry Sleeman

In 1829, the Agent at Mahidpur Captain William Borthwick arrested 74 Thugs for the murder of five travellers. Up until this point, efforts against thuggee had been led by local authorities. The case marked the first major intervention by the central government in Bengal, which sought both to secure convictions and to establish a judicial argument that treated Thugs in the same manner as pirates whereby they could be punished by whoever captured them. In an October 1829 letter, the Government explained that the murders had occurred across territories belonging to different Native Chiefs, meaning that no single authority was in a position to try the perpetrators. (Note: In the letter, the Government stated: "The hands of these inhuman monsters being against everyone, and there being no country within the range of their annual excursions from, Bundelkhand to Guzerat, in which they have not committed murder, it appears that they may be considered like Pirates, to be placed without the pale of social law, and be subjected to condign punishment by whatever authority they may be seized and convicted.") Forty of the Thugs were hanged, 20 sentenced to transportation for life, and a further 12 received limited sentences. Chief Secretary to the Government George Swinton proposed that an officer be placed in charge of five approvers (the period term for informants) and tasked exclusively with apprehending Thugs, with the Agent at Bundelkhand selected to inspect villages in cooperation with the village chiefs.

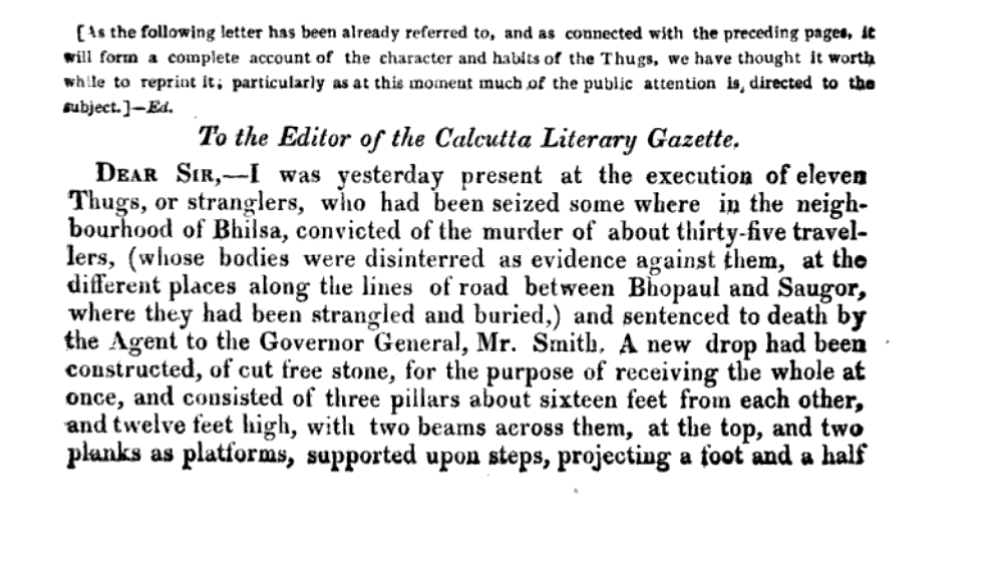
The beginning of the October 1830 letter, reprinted in 1832

Captain William Henry Sleeman, as assistant to the Agent at Jubbulpore, began assigning approvers that he had in custody to escort detachments of troops along exposed routes, and his methods led to the arrests of 24 Thugs in 1830. Sleeman and Borthwick's arrests led to an extensive exchange of information between officials and the sharing of approvers, resulting in a spate of arrests over the course of 1830. In October, Sleeman contributed an anonymous letter to the Calcutta Literary Gazette entitled 'Thugs' that recounted the execution of 11 Thugs and asserted that Thugs were fanatical worshippers of a tutelary goddess under the names "Davey, Kalee, Doorga, and Bhowanee". The letter also asserted that the Thugs were headquartered at Vindhyachal Temple near Mirzapur, where their expeditions were planned by the temple priests. It further provided details on the alleged religious nature of thuggee and demanded that the government "put an end in some way or other to this dreadful system of murder, by which thousands of human beings are now annually sacrificed upon every great road throughout India".

The letter made an impression on the Government, with Swinton writing the following day that the destruction of "this Tribe would... be a blessing conferred on the people of India" comparable to the abolition of sati. Swinton was the prime instigator within the Government of efforts to combat thuggee and, while the author of the letter remained anonymous, Sleeman was appointed Agent at Saugor later that month. In November, Francis Curwen Smith, Agent for the Saugor and Nerbudda Territories, submitted a plan that he had co-authored with Sleeman. It called for the appointment of a Superintendent for the Suppression of Thugs, who would send Thugs to be tried in the Saugor and Nerbudda courts. The report marked the first portrayal of thuggee as an irredeemable identity rooted in bloodlust. Governor-General Lord William Bentinck declined to establish a specific office for thuggee, though he provided Sleeman with 50 barkandazes (Note: Guards armed with swords and shields or matchlocks.) to pursue and apprehend the gangs. The October 1829 letter was cited by Smith and Sleeman as recognising a new jurisdiction under the Company's Political Department and establishing the principle of British paramountcy regarding the trial of Thugs in native states.

Smith, in his capacity as Commissioner of the Saugor and Nerbudda Territories, oversaw the thuggee trials while Sleeman was appointed Superintendent of the operations. The operations saw approvers sent out with detachments of troops to disinter bodies and point out their former associates, with the campaign's supply of approvers growing as more Thugs were caught. In December 1830, Sleeman captured the thuggee gang leader Feringheea after holding his relatives captive, which was used by Smith and Sleeman to publicise the campaign and argue for more resources. From 1830 onwards, the Government ordered Thugs sentenced to imprisonment to be branded with the Godna (a traditional tattoo) on a part of the body exposed to view, typically the forehead. In 1832 and 1833 officials were despatched to the Doab and Rajputana respectively to oversee anti-thuggee operations there. Thugs were convicted based on circumstantial evidence and approver testimony and, between 1832 and 1833, 145 Thugs were hanged, 323 sentenced to deportation, and 41 given life in prison by the Saugor and Nerbudda courts. Sleeman played different thuggee factions off against one another to secure approver testimony, exploiting the varying loyalties between different families and castes within the gangs, such as between Hindu and Muslim Thugs.

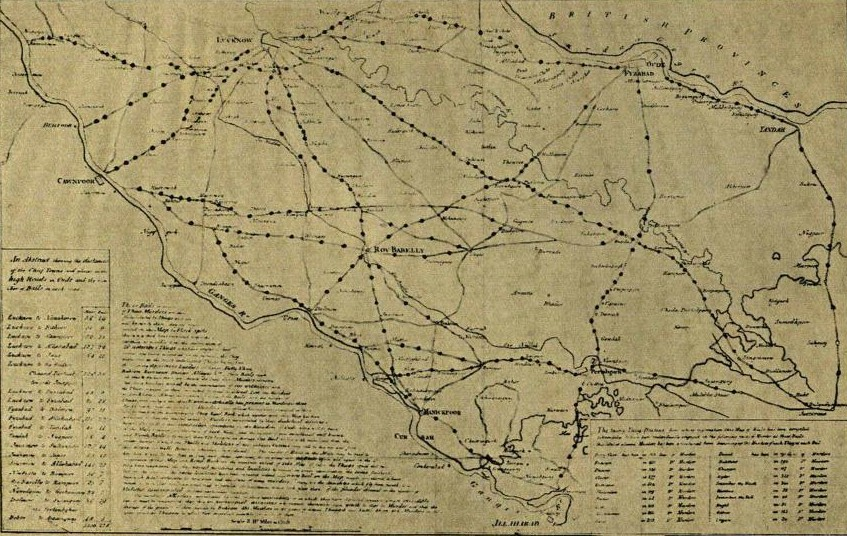
1838 map of thuggee activity in the Oudh State created by Captain James Paton, the Assistant Resident at Lucknow in charge of the Anti-Thuggee Campaign in Oudh from the mid-1830s (Note: Buhram Jemadar, one of the approvers in Paton's possession at Lucknow, claimed to have been involved in 931 murders, for which he later earned a Guinness World Record.)

In 1834, Smith began to call for a central agency for the suppression of thuggee that would station officials in more territories. Backed by an official report, the Government established the Thuggee Department in January 1835 and appointed Sleeman "General Superintendent of the operations for the suppression of Thuggee" in March. In 1836, "River-Thugs" operating on the Ganges were discovered in Bihar, Orissa, and Bengal. They disposed of their victims by throwing them overboard, leaving very little circumstantial evidence to convict them with.

Sleeman used this to argue that new regulation was required to enable convictions and Act XXX of 1836 was passed, which made simply belonging to a thuggee gang punishable by life imprisonment with hard labour. (Note: The Thuggee Act also removed the need for fatwas from law officers, thus removing the influence of Islamic law on the cases.) The term Thug was not defined and it thereafter became a legal umbrella-term for a range of crimes such as poisoning (Datura Thugs), while the original thuggee gangs that could be traced back to Sindouse had practically ceased to exist by this point. Dacoity was added to Sleeman's responsibilities in 1838 and, in 1839, he coined the term Megpunnaism to refer to the murder of impoverished parents to attain their children for sale, portraying it as a new form of thuggee. Following the failure of efforts by the Thuggee and Dacoity Department to apply anti-thuggee legislation to itinerant communities and bands of mendicants, Sleeman declared in 1839 that thuggee had been effectively destroyed as an organisation, marking the end of the campaign. Some 4,224 people were convicted of being Thugs between 1826 and 1847. Between c. 1826 and 1841, thuggee trials had a conviction rate of 98.9%.

===== Aftermath and legacy =====
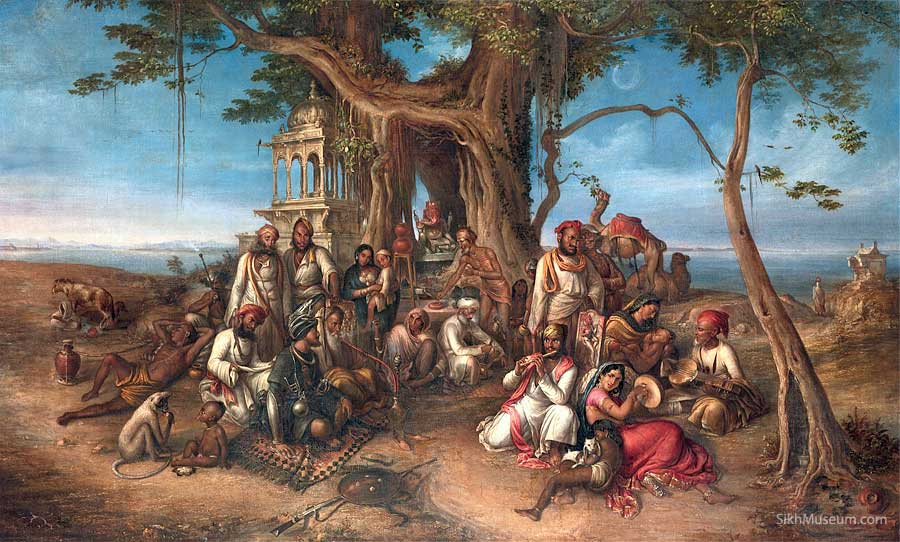
The Thugs of India: Halt at the Shrine of Ganesh by August Schoefft, c. 1841. The painting depicts a Sikh (centre-left) being deceived by Thugs and a murder about to happen.

The Anti-Thuggee Campaign of the 1830s served as a precursor to the centralised police bureaucracy that emerged under the British Raj in the aftermath of the Indian Rebellion of 1857. It also established a limited pan-Indian framework for policing and surveillance, and marked one of the first times that the study of criminality was recognised and co-opted into colonial rule. In 1839, Philip Meadows Taylor published the novel Confessions of a Thug, which derived much of its material from Sleeman's writings and popularised the Thugs. Thuggee thereafter became a Victorian sensation, with Queen Victoria herself requesting the pre-publication proofs of Taylor's book. The publication of Confessions of a Thug launched a literary tradition and among those to subsequently write about thuggee were Eugène Sue in his 1844 novel The Wandering Jew and Mark Twain in his 1897 book Following the Equator. Thuggee emerged as an iconic image within colonial lore and fiction, and historians in the colonial tradition have cited the thuggee campaign in particular to redeem the record of Company rule.

In the 1840s, the Thuggee and Dacoity Department shifted its focus to communities of "hereditary dacoits", with Act XXIV of 1843 extending the provisions of the 1836 Thuggee Act to include "professional Dacoits". From the 1860s, the department's operations were restricted to policing cross-border crime and it was abolished as a special agency operating on British territory. The later policing campaigns it pursued criminalised communities connected to the practice of raiding and protection, which had served as a form of indigenous police. The archives of the Thuggee and Dacoity Department were repeatedly cited as evidence for the existence of "criminal tribes" and the department was a key player in the presentation of a crime plague perpetrated by itinerant and semi-nomadic communities. This culminated in the 1871 Criminal Tribes Act (CTA), with the department tasked with controlling its implementation for a time. The Thuggee and Dacoity Department was replaced in 1904 with the Department of Criminal Intelligence. As late as the 1940s, the Intelligence Bureau in Shimla was referred to by rickshaw wallahs as the "Thagi Daftar" ("Thuggee Office"). The CTA was repealed in 1949 and the tribes were officially "denotified" in 1952 with the introduction of the Habitual Offenders Act.

=== Historical evaluations ===
==== Sources and historicity ====
The vast majority of primary sources that exist on thuggee were written by Sleeman and his colleagues, including published texts as well as manuscripts in the East India Company archives, leaving historians with very few alternative accounts with which to confirm, balance, or invalidate the colonial sources. The colonial-era representation of thuggee began to come under scholarly criticism in the 1950s. There is a general consensus among contemporary historians against the portrayal of thuggee as a fraternity of ritual stranglers that sacrificed its victims to Kali. Scholars generally agree that Sleeman's representation, derived from his interviews with approvers, was distorted by the prejudices and misinterpretations of the time. Historians such as Hiralal Gupta, Stewart N. Gordon, Christopher Bayly, Martine van Woerkens, Radhika Singha, Kim A. Wagner, and Mike Dash have sought to engage with the sources to revise Sleeman's colonial-era representation, mostly presenting the Thugs as more or less ordinary criminals, or thuggee as a type of banditry. While the historian Tom Lloyd does not reject this approach, he criticises the assumption that the sources present a truth waiting to be uncovered and asserts the view that they can only be used to study how thuggee was represented.

Literary scholar Amal Chatterjee describes the colonial representation of thuggee as "a fiction that served all the interests of British power in India", wherein it provided conclusive proof of the moral superiority of the "advanced European" over the "primitive Indian" and was presented as a triumph of Christian faith over Indian tradition. Sanjay Subrahmanyam notes that Company rule in India had been under attack at home by figures such as Adam Smith and Edmund Burke and places thuggee within the context of the Company's response that saw it build up its moral superiority and entitlement to rule. Van Woerkens points to how thuggee allowed the British to reformulate their relations with native states. Wagner describes the events of the 1830s as a moral panic and asserts that thuggee became entangled in the need to legitimise the expansion of the colonial state. Historian Parama Roy argues that the colonial discourse on thuggee was highly self-referential, that discrepancies between approver accounts were smoothed over, and that approvers were driven to authenticate the official knowledge of thuggee.

Wagner argues that while the colonial representation cannot be taken at face value, it was not invented from nothing. He contends that because the records include the questions asked by British officials, historians can identify and evaluate the biases they contain. Alexander Lyon Macfie concludes that, though the so-called "thuggee archive" should be seen in part as an Orientalist construction, it is broadly accurate in its presentation of most of the facts. Wagner and Dash point to consistencies across the earliest independent reports of thuggee as evidence that the phenomenon had some basis in a social reality. Van Woerkens holds the Thugs' recorded argot of Ramasee to place them in a "concrete reality". Dash further points to British efforts to keep their approvers isolated from one another and the bodies that were exhumed. (Note: According to Singha, the Thuggee and Dacoity Department, throughout its life, had to sustain a rhetoric about the reliability of its approver system in preventing collusion, to strengthen the prosecution.) Wagner cites the volume of information collected by British officials that had no bearing on legal procedures as evidence that thuggee was not simply a colonial project for legitimacy or control over their Indian subjects.

Historians generally accept that thuggee—loosely defined as the activities of various social classes and communities upon which the term was imposed—was probably related to Company policy from the late 18th century up to the 1830s. Most scholars view thuggee in the context of political chaos and socioeconomic disruption amidst the decline of the Mughal Empire, exacerbated by the expansion of British rule. Following a theory first posited by Gupta in 1959, historians such as Wagner, Singha, and Dash argue that many Thugs were former soldiers who became unemployed due to a contraction in the military labour market as a result of British expansion and the disbandment of native armies through subsidiary alliances. Wagner argues that the disbanded soldiers, who were often paid with loot, simply continued their predatory lifestyle. Singha surmises that highway robbery was probably practised by mercenary bands moving between employers and may have become permanent as military opportunities declined.

Wagner concludes in favour of Halhed's view on the nature of the Thugs, stating that they were "no more than a species of robber... best understood in the context of banditry rather than some vague notion of a religious sect or caste-like entity". He judges that thuggee could be distinguished from other types of banditry based on the combination of secrecy, deception, and the murder of the victims. Wagner concludes that thuggee was a longstanding phenomenon predating British colonial rule and that there was not a single representative Thug archetype. He also describes Sleeman as an "eminent self-publicist" whose campaign owed more to the early anti-thuggee operations from 1809 to 1812 than to his own initiative or genius.

Dash judges the distinguishing feature of Thugs to be that they invariably murdered their victims before robbing them. Dash estimates that as many as 3,000 people derived some form of livelihood from thuggee, describing its techniques as "a system of murder without parallel". Dash surmises that thuggee likely reached its peak in the 1820s following the break-up of the Pindari bands and the disbandment of the Maratha armies. He further links this to economic hardship caused by recurring famines and harsh rents levied by the Company to recover expenses incurred during the Pindari and Maratha wars. He suggests that the famines of the late 18th century, despite being more destructive than the depression of the 1820s, likely forced fewer people into banditry due to an abundance of opportunities in military employment. Dash states that thuggee could not be considered 'organised crime' in the modern sense of the term as the Thugs lacked a central organisation or complex hierarchy. He also notes that, though the thuggee trials were deficient by today's standards, especially regarding the right to counsel, thousands of men at the time were convicted of murder in India, Europe, and the United States on far less evidence. In contrast to colonial-era estimates that could be as high as one million, Dash estimates that the number of people killed by thuggee was probably no more than 50,000 to 100,000.

Van Woerkens, who authored the first scholarly monograph on thuggee in 2002, conversely theorises that the Thugs had once been authentic worshippers of Kali but that their religious construction had broken down over time and their community identity had disintegrated due to geographical dispersion. Van Woerkens suggests that the Thugs may have been made up of Banjaras, Pindaris, and Nagas whose livelihoods were disrupted by the British conquest. She bases her interpretation upon investigating the etymologies within Ramasee and analysing the various discourses surrounding thuggee. While van Woerkens's book has been described as well-researched and her account of the development of the colonial representation has been commended, her work has received criticism from scholars that view it as being "old-fashioned and inconsistent".

Gordon viewed the Thugs as marauders that provided revenues to landholders, while Bayly and Singha saw them as bandits without a definitive modus operandi. Bayly posited that the initial British reaction stemmed from an 'information panic' whereby the new colonial administration feared both its lack of knowledge about the Indian population and the possibility that locals were deliberately withholding information. Van Woerkens describes the colonial-era portrayal of thuggee as a projection of British fear and anxiety arising from the prospect of ruling over a people they knew little about. According to Wagner, some officials "clearly" exploited the Government's concern over thuggee to assume more authority, with Sleeman's opportunism merely part of a wider trend that he refined.

== Culture and beliefs ==
=== Methods ===
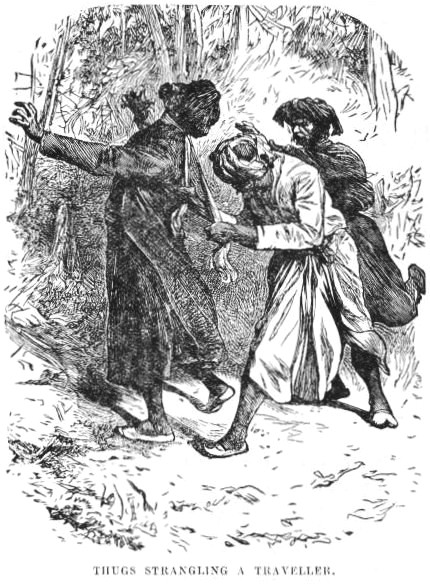
19th-century depiction of Thugs strangling a traveller

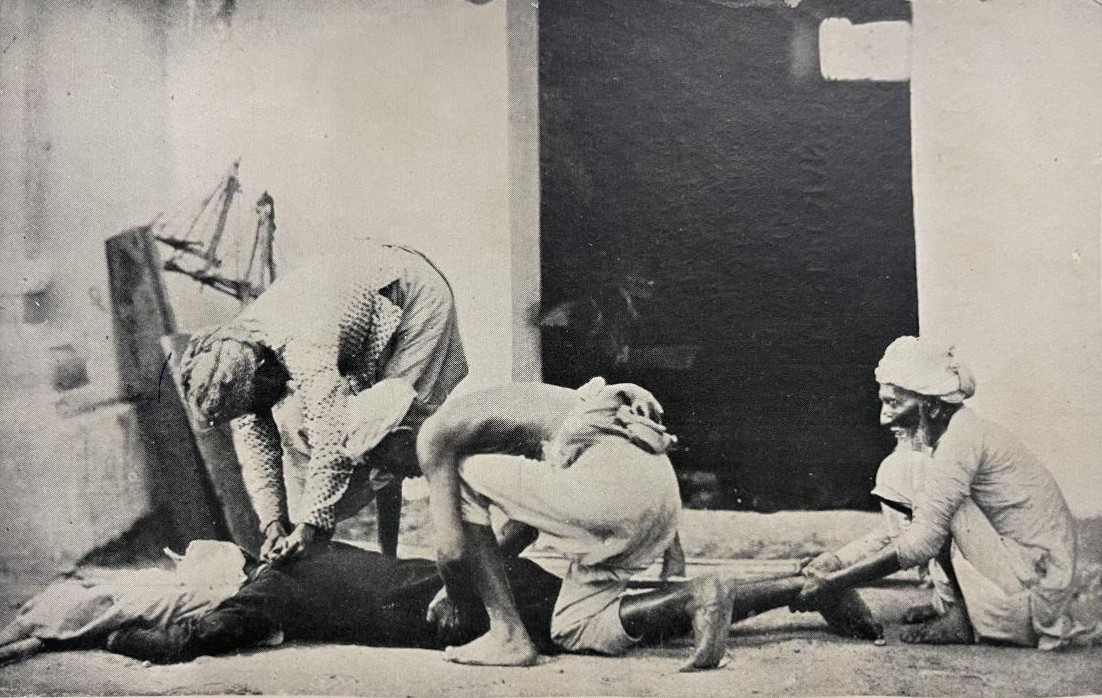
Photograph of captured Thugs, likely in 1858, demonstrating their method of strangulation, as they were occasionally made to do for Western tourists

Thuggee gangs embarked on seasonal expeditions for months at a time, typically leaving in Kartika after the autumn harvest and returning around Asharh at the start of the monsoon season. Among the main victims of thuggee were sepoys, soldiers of native rulers, merchants, and Hindu and Muslim pilgrims. There were reputedly no European victims of thuggee. The Thugs would commonly ingratiate themselves among parties of travellers based on mutual protection, adopting a range of disguises as soldiers in search of work, merchants, mendicants, wealthy people, Brahmins, sepoys, pundits, or travellers. Thugs preferred wealthy victims and used scouts to gather information on travellers and whether the roads were clear.

According to Hussain's testimony, thuggee generally involved strangling a victim using a handkerchief with a knot tied at the end as a sort of handle, with Thugs formerly having used cord or twine. The colonial-era account of thuggee presented the various functions within the practice, such as holding the victim's hands, as specialised roles. Thugs sometimes strangled their victims in the night or woke them up, pretending that it was almost dawn, and took them to a secluded spot along the road. They sometimes administered datura seeds to their victims to incapacitate them before killing them. Thugs also frequently murdered their victims with swords, knives, or poison, whereafter their bodies would be thrown into a well or a nullah, or buried in a hole dug with pickaxes. By the second half of the 19th century, the popular image of Thugs was that they murdered exclusively by strangulation, never shedding blood. Dash notes that Thugs had no objection to shedding blood once their victims were dead. He links the preference for strangulation to the Hanafi school of Islamic jurisprudence prevalent in Mughal India, which treated murder with a weapon (typically associated with bloodshed) more severely. Convicted stranglers were instead flogged, imprisoned, and made to pay blood money to their victim's family.

There were no eyewitnesses, as the Thugs murdered entire parties. Circumstantial evidence was scarce because the killings were carried out by stealth, and common items such as a rumāl, scarf, dhoti, or cord could easily be found on innocent travellers. It was also a recorded practice among Thugs to stab their victims in the eyes to prevent them from being recognised or to ensure they were dead. (Note: According to Hussain's testimony, this was because one strangled victim had recovered and escaped.) Wagner describes thuggee as "very close to being the 'perfect crime'", noting that its inexpensive nature made it accessible to a wide range of people. The 1836 Thuggee Act was later used to prosecute child trafficking and robbers who poisoned their victims. Amid controversy over the jurisdiction of the Thuggee and Dacoity Department, thuggee was defined in Act III of 1848 to include poisoning as a species of thuggee, even if it was not always lethal, and "child-stealing".

=== Religious beliefs ===
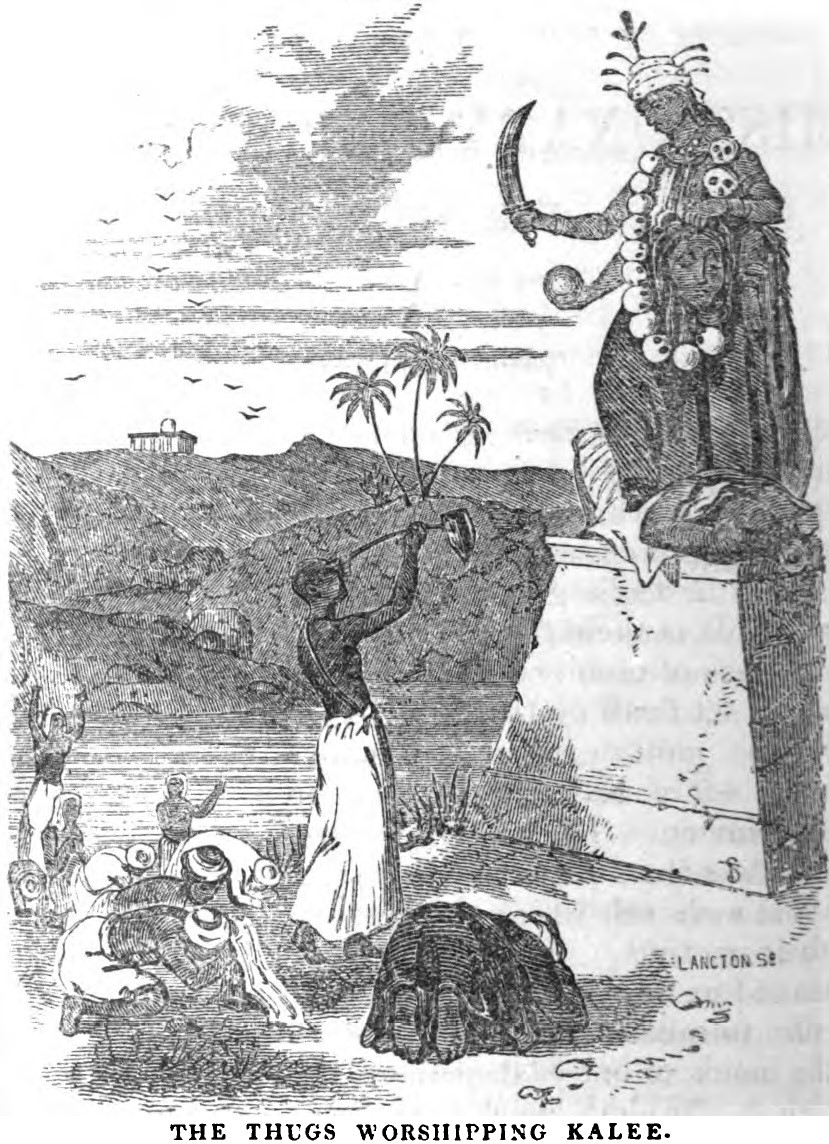
Depiction of Thugs worshipping Kali in a Sunday school missionary magazine, c. 1850

Depositions of Thugs conducted in the 1830s contain accounts of rituals and ceremonies that they partook in during their expeditions. In the interviews, Sleeman's colleague Captain James Paton specifically homed in on the Thugs' religious orientations, asking loaded questions based on Christian thought. When conducting the interviews, Sleeman and Paton were predominantly interested in the goddess-worship of the Thugs, their observance of rules and omens, and the variance between different gangs' customs. Wagner holds their "extreme interest" in matters of religion to "very likely" have influenced how the approvers discussed their own identities. The significance of religion to thuggee has differed between revisionist historians and those of the colonial tradition, epitomised by Jorge Luis Borges in 1923 when, after reading Confessions of a Thug, he posed the question: "Were the Thugs brigands who sanctified their profession with the cult of the goddess [Bhavani], or was it the cult of the Goddess [Bhavani] that turned them into brigands?"

Thugs worshipped different manifestations of Devi, of which Bhavani was most often referred to, reflecting a variety of traditions. The approvers themselves do not mention Kali in the sources, with the only mentions being Sleeman's own comments. According to Wagner and van Woerkens, they believed their actions to be sanctioned by the Goddess. Though the British were fascinated by the fact that Muslims worshipped Hindu deities, religious syncretism in India was common. According to Cynthia Ann Humes, Thug testimony only rarely referred to Bhavani, mostly in response to Sleeman's leading questions, and the Islamic concept of fate was invoked most often. Some Muslim approvers disowned Bhavani upon turning King's evidence, having identified her with Fatima or as an instrument of Allah, and thereby maintained their belief in monotheism. In interviews with Paton, Muslim approvers described Bhavani as "only for thuggee", with another characterising her as "the chief of that trade". Sleeman estimated that about a third of Thugs were Muslims.

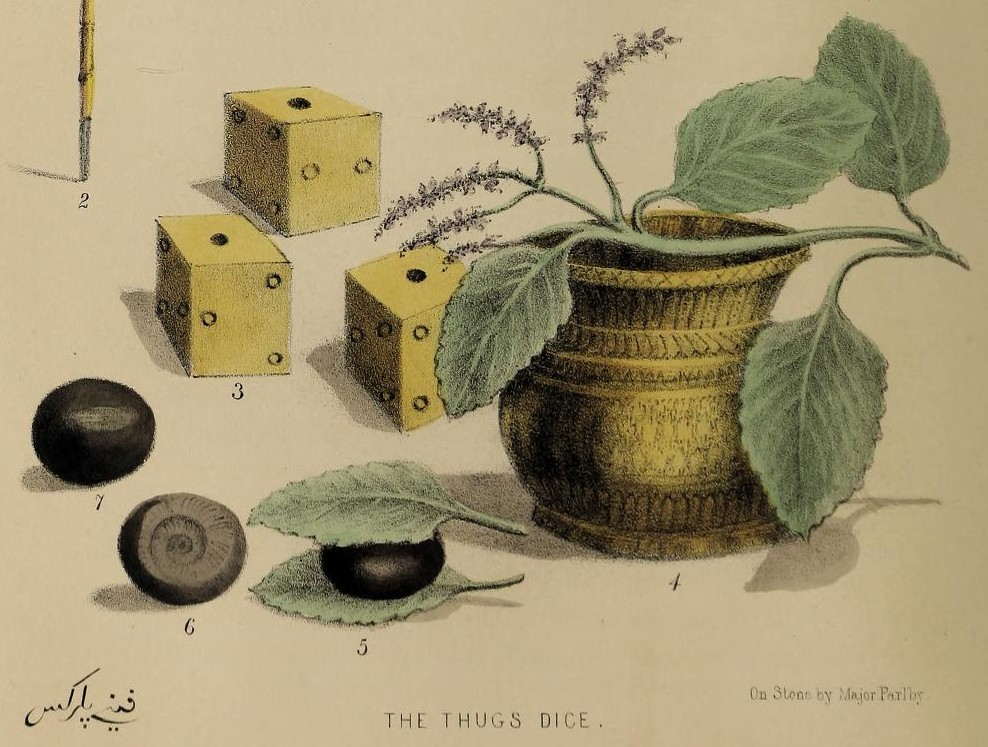
Sketch of The Thugs Dice gifted to Fanny Parkes by a magistrate in October 1830. According to Parkes, they were used during thuggee expeditions to ascertain which days would be lucky or unlucky.

The Thugs also held a myth of divine origins based on a story from the Devi Mahatmya in which Kali fought with the demon Raktabīja, aided by a group of goddesses called Matrikas. In the Thugs' version, they took the place of the Matrikas and the final demons were defeated with strangulation. Sleeman claimed that the myth held "Kalee Davey" to have created the progenitors of Thugs. Thugs ate consecrated goor in honour of Devi and made offerings to her before their expeditions. However, Feringheea, Sleeman's favourite approver, clearly disputed that Thugs had a special relationship with the temples and priests of Devi in a conversation that was published in Sleeman's 1836 book Ramaseeana, which Wagner describes as "the canon of the colonial discourse on thuggee". They followed certain omens, with a bad omen such as the call of a hare being enough to abort a murder.

Richard Sherwood, who authored the first scholarly work on thuggee out of the Madras Presidency in 1816, was the first to mention religion in connection with the phenomenon. Sherwood described the phansigars as highly superstitious, who, though some of them were Muslim, held "Cali or Mariatta" as their tutelary deity. In making an argument for the inadequacy of regulation in 1818, Perry's assistant made the earliest known reference in northern India to thuggee having a religious element, whereby he claimed that they "worshipped and sacrificed a kid to obtain the auspicious protection of their deity". By the early 1830s, the religious elements of thuggee had been sensationalised by Sleeman and brought to the fore.

According to Wagner and Singha, the religious beliefs and practices of those who practised thuggee were common in the wider population. Wagner states that "robbers, who did not worship a tutelary deity, perform pujas or entertain certain beliefs concerning the moral sanction of their acts would have been truly exceptional in an Indian context". Singha asserts that the examining officers of the Thuggee Department were "in fact becoming acquainted with popular religion and culture but refracted through the prism of criminality". Dash similarly surmises that the motives behind thuggee were not religious in nature, concluding that the Thugs' beliefs were closer to folklore than a distinct faith. Wagner notes that ordinary dacoits, who were never assumed to have religious motivations, also made offerings and held a puja before and after robberies. Drawing a parallel to Carlo Ginzburg's study of the benandanti in early modern Italy, Wagner argues that the attention Sleeman and Paton gave to religion served to distort a phenomenon of highway robbers. He surmises that the incentive for thuggee most likely had nothing to do with religion and that the British were drawn to the ritual and religious meaning that the Thugs ascribed to their acts in pursuit of legitimacy and moral or social status. (Note: In a 1984 article, terrorism scholar David C. Rapoport presented thuggee as a prototype of apolitical "religious terrorism", claiming that the Thugs deliberately sought to inflict pain and terror on their victims. Wagner disputes this, citing approver depositions and noting that Sleeman himself wrote: "I have very rarely discovered any instance of what may, perhaps, be termed wanton cruelty; that is pain inflicted beyond what was necessary to deprive the person of life—pain either to the mind or body". [emphasis in original].)

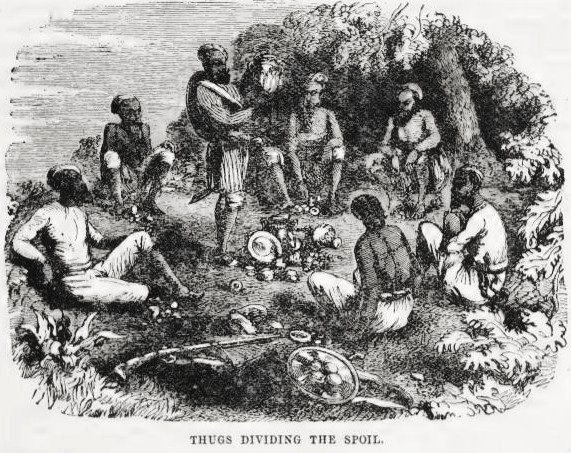
Thugs depicted with their loot, 19th century. According to Dash, thuggee hauls were generally divided among many gang members and most Thugs earned very little from the expeditions.

In contrast to this and based on interviews in which Thugs were asked how it was that they were about to be hanged if they were divinely protected, van Woerkens concludes that the Thugs had once been true shaktas but that their internal belief system had collapsed due to an "unbounded lust for loot". (Note: She places the Thugs in a Tantric tradition. Based on Wilhelm Halbfass's work, she links their supposed beliefs to the Samsaramochaka, religious killers briefly mentioned by Kumārila Bhaṭṭa that believed himsa (antithetical to ahimsa) to be virtuous, and Yoginis in the Netratantra that sacrifice human beings to unite their victims with Shiva.) She theorises that this caused the Thugs' quest for salvation to devolve from ritually controlled violent actions to mass crimes for which the goods they stole no longer constituted divine payments in return for the sacrificial victims. Wagner criticises van Woerkens for deconstructing the colonial representation of thuggee only to ultimately resurrect it using Sleeman's own account.

=== Place in society and customs ===
Local zamindars and rajas retained Thugs in return for a share of the loot or as mercenaries. This practice was part of a wider institutionalised phenomenon that also extended to kazaks and other marauders. (Note: According to Gordon and Wagner, the Thugs were the lowest status group in the hierarchy of these marauders.) According to the daroga of Sindouse in 1810, the locals supported themselves by cultivating the land for eight months of the year and for the remainder by horse trading or committing thuggee. A patwari from Parihara stated in 1812 that the Thugs had been living in the area for generations and never cultivated the land, but brought back valuables from their expeditions. He also stated that the local zamindars took care of their families while they were gone and earned interest on loans given to the Thugs. The Thugs were also commonly and interchangeably referred to by themselves and fellow villagers as sepoys (meaning 'soldier' or 'retainer') and borrowed military terminology in their use of jemadar to mean gang leader and subedar for when several bands joined together. Rather than composing a "counter-society... fully excluded from the 'law-abiding' sedentary society", Wagner asserts that links between thuggee gangs and various communities evidence a loose-knit "itinerant underworld" of overlapping criminal networks.

Thugs commonly spared the children of their victims, and a large number of them were subsequently adopted. Girls were married off to the sons or relatives of their adopter, thus avoiding the costs of a dowry. According to Wagner, boys tended to go to childless parents in the context of high infant mortality rates. Dash states that they were used by their adopted fathers to secure an extra portion of the loot, pointing to how British officials sometimes referred to the adopted children as "slaves". Thugs did not always spare children, and, according to Wagner, only well-off Thugs with a secure home base tended to adopt them. Paton's approvers, such as Buhram, saw themselves as being above common thieves. Wagner states that the Thugs perceived themselves, and wanted to be perceived, as "warrior-gentlemen" with a code of honour resembling that of the order of Kshatriya, inspired by the martial ethos of the local Rajput landowners. Thugs' customs or superstitions forbade them from murdering women or members of certain lower castes, though according to Dash this was not scrupulously observed.

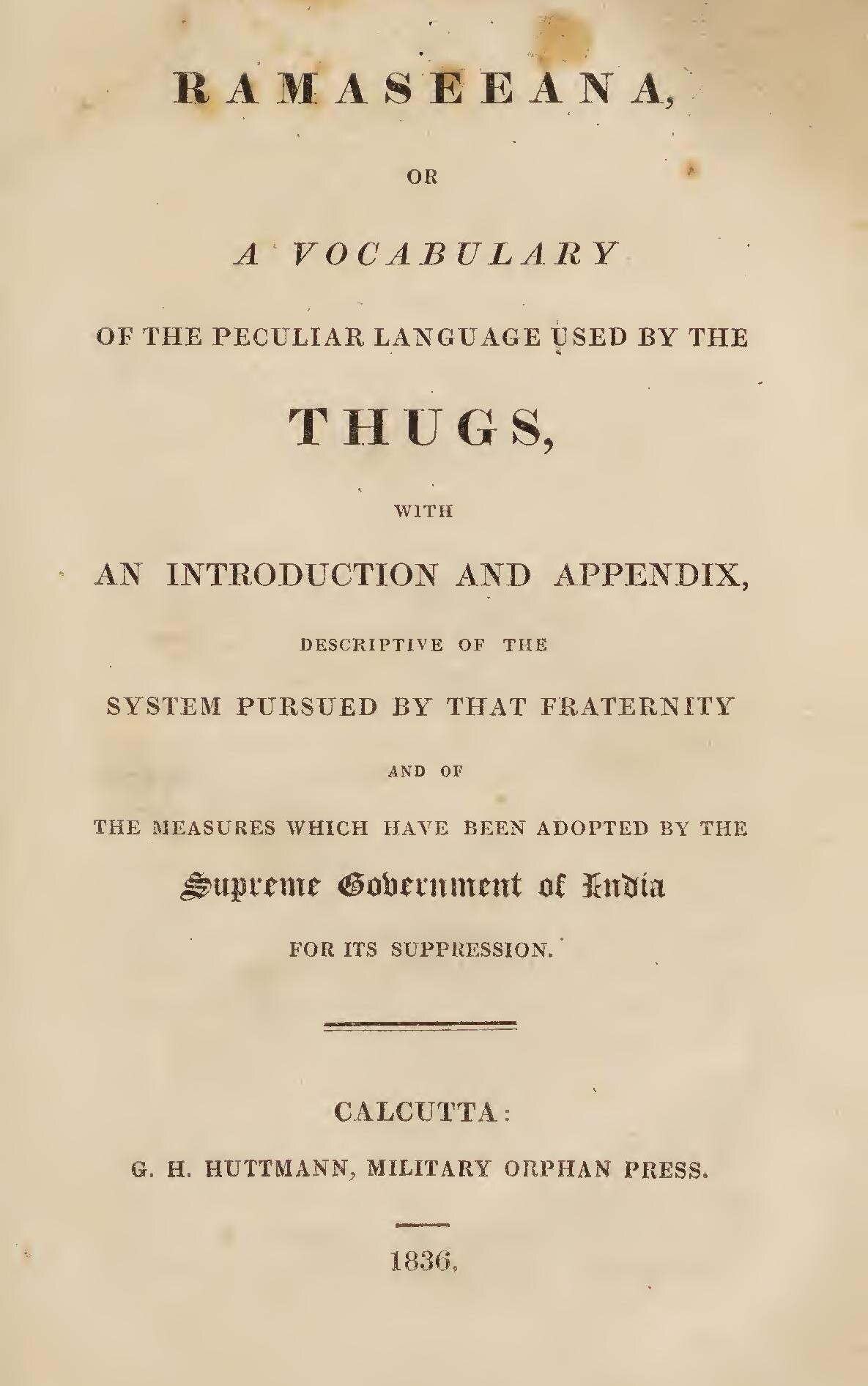
Title page of the 1836 book Ramaseeana

The Thugs used a criminal argot called Ramasee, which Sleeman compiled from interviews with more than a dozen Thugs for his 1836 work, Ramaseeana. Sleeman perceived the "peculiar language" as being the key to uncovering thuggee and collected the vocabulary with a focus on establishing the Thugs as rigidly governed by fixed rituals, rules, and omens. Sherwood had also published in 1816 a list of 57 "slang terms and phrases" from phansigars imprisoned in Madras, 20 of which also appeared in Sleeman's vocabulary derived from Thugs in northern and central India.

Thugs used the argot to communicate in front of their victims, to identify other Thugs, and to define identity and status. The argot involved giving secondary meanings to established words and phrases so as not to arouse suspicion, such as using Tumbakoolao ('bring tobacco') to give the signal for the murders to take place. Similar argots were used by many different groups in 19th-century India as the lingua franca of the itinerant underworld and trading communities, with Wagner surmising that Ramasee was not exclusive to Thugs. Wagner disputes that Ramasee could be thought of as a language, or even as a fixed argot, and asserts that it was also employed by traders, jugglers, and peddlers.

=== Hereditary nature ===
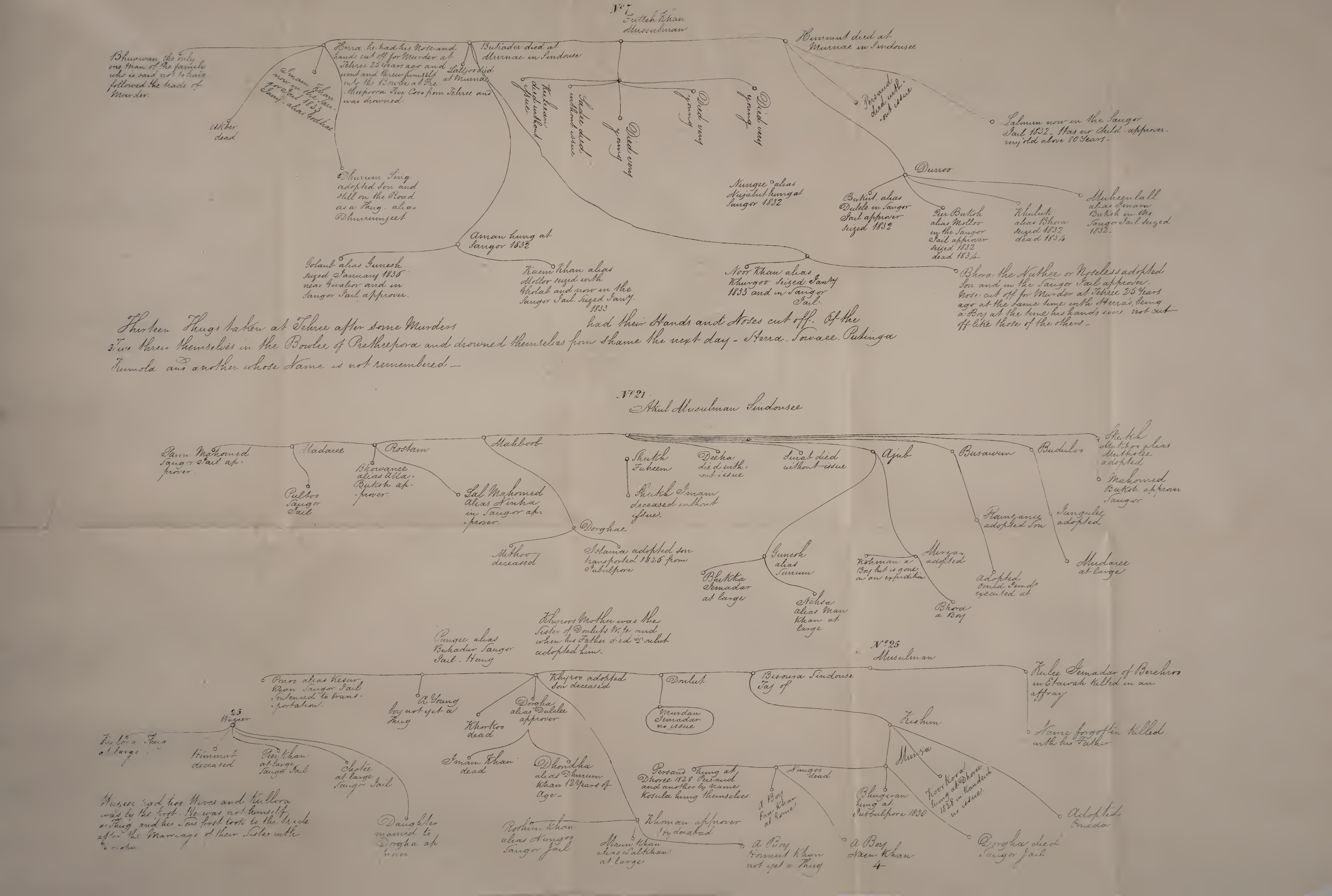
One of Sleeman's genealogical trees, published in Ramaseeana

During the 1830s, British officials propagated an image of Thugs as hereditary, cult-oriented criminals. This representation, reinforced by detailed recording of their beliefs, slang, and superstitions, helped justify special legal procedures. Thuggee was also portrayed as an all-India conspiracy. Though Sherwood described the phansigars as "hereditary murderers and plunderers", he posited that their lack of compassion and ruthlessness was due to their never having known an alternative rather than an inherent evil. According to an 1834 report by the Thuggee Department officer in Rajputana Donald Friell McLeod, the Thugs believed that they all originated from a group 15 generations prior that settled around Delhi under the protection of the Mughal emperor. According to the legend, this group initially committed no crimes but was forced to flee after murdering one of their own, giving rise to seven nomadic Muslim clans. Starting from the 1797 tax list, Sleeman made detailed genealogies of Thugs that he published in Ramaseeana, though they tended not to stretch further back than three generations and included the names of adopted children. The colonial-era portrayal saw thuggee as an ancient practice, with Sleeman arguing that the Sagartii of the 5th century BCE were ancestors of the stranglers described by Thévenot.

According to Wagner and Dash, alongside "hereditary thugs" that followed a family tradition and were rooted in their village, there were also "occasional thugs" that fell in and out of the practice. Wagner asserts that thuggee was not a uniform phenomenon and that there was no uniformity among the individuals who practised it, further stating that the extant sources do not allow for discussion about the existence of thuggee prior to the 17th century. Singha and Lloyd similarly emphasise the diversity of individuals arrested for thuggee, with Singha noting that Thugs' alternative occupations were often dismissed by the colonial authorities as disguises. Singha argues that the extensive material produced by the Thuggee and Dacoity Department on the hereditary nature of Thugs and Dacoits actually masked the colonial regime's failure to develop effective policing and prosecution systems capable of linking specific crimes to individual offenders.

== Notable groups ==
Map of the Indian subcontinent, 1827

British officials recorded extensive lists of subgroupings, and the colonial-era material on thuggee alludes to some 40 different 'classes' of Thugs. Notable groups include:

- Sindouse Thugs: based around the town of Sindouse (modern-day Sindaus, Uttar Pradesh), which as of 1812 was on the British–Maratha border. Feringheea hailed from the area. After the 1812 expedition, the Sindouse Thugs resettled in Maratha territory. Laljee, the head zamindar of Sindouse who had protected the gangs and given them financial advances, was arrested in December 1812 amid a ₨ 5,000 reward for his capture and sentenced to life in prison with hard labour.
- Telingana Thugs: from the Telangana region in the northern Deccan. Other groups of Thugs from the area reportedly refused to mix with them on the basis that they were descended from cattle herders and itinerant tradesmen, and thus of a lower caste.
- Moltanee (Multaneea) Thugs: deriving their name from the city of Multan. They supposedly strangled their victims with the leather thongs they used to drive their oxen, suggesting that their main occupation was cattle herding and transportation.
- Soosea Thugs: recorded as being based in Rajasthan and Malwa, operating in Gujarat, Khandesh, and Rajasthan itself. The largest thuggee spoils have been attributed to a Soosea gang from Rajputana, amounting to ₨ 200,000 seized in Khandesh in the early 19th century.
- River Thugs: operated on the Ganges in Bihar, Bengal, and Orissa. Numbering approximately 300, they tricked passengers onto their boats and strangled them, whereafter they would throw the bodies overboard. Discovered by the British authorities in 1836, they were largely suppressed by 1840.
- Megpunna Thugs: a loose association of thieves discovered in the vicinity of Delhi that included itinerant groups such as the Banjara and Naik, but otherwise shared a similar modus operandi, argot, and religious beliefs to common Thugs. They murdered parents to sell their children, typically strangling them with reins, and were officially classified as Thugs in 1839. According to Dash, the group originated in 1826, never numbered more than 200 people, and operated mostly in the Delhi and Rajputana regions.
- Tashma-baz Thugs: thimble-riggers found on the outskirts of Cawnpore in 1848. They were legally classified as Thugs due to their having murdered and robbed a few travellers that they had met on the roads.

=== Approvers ===
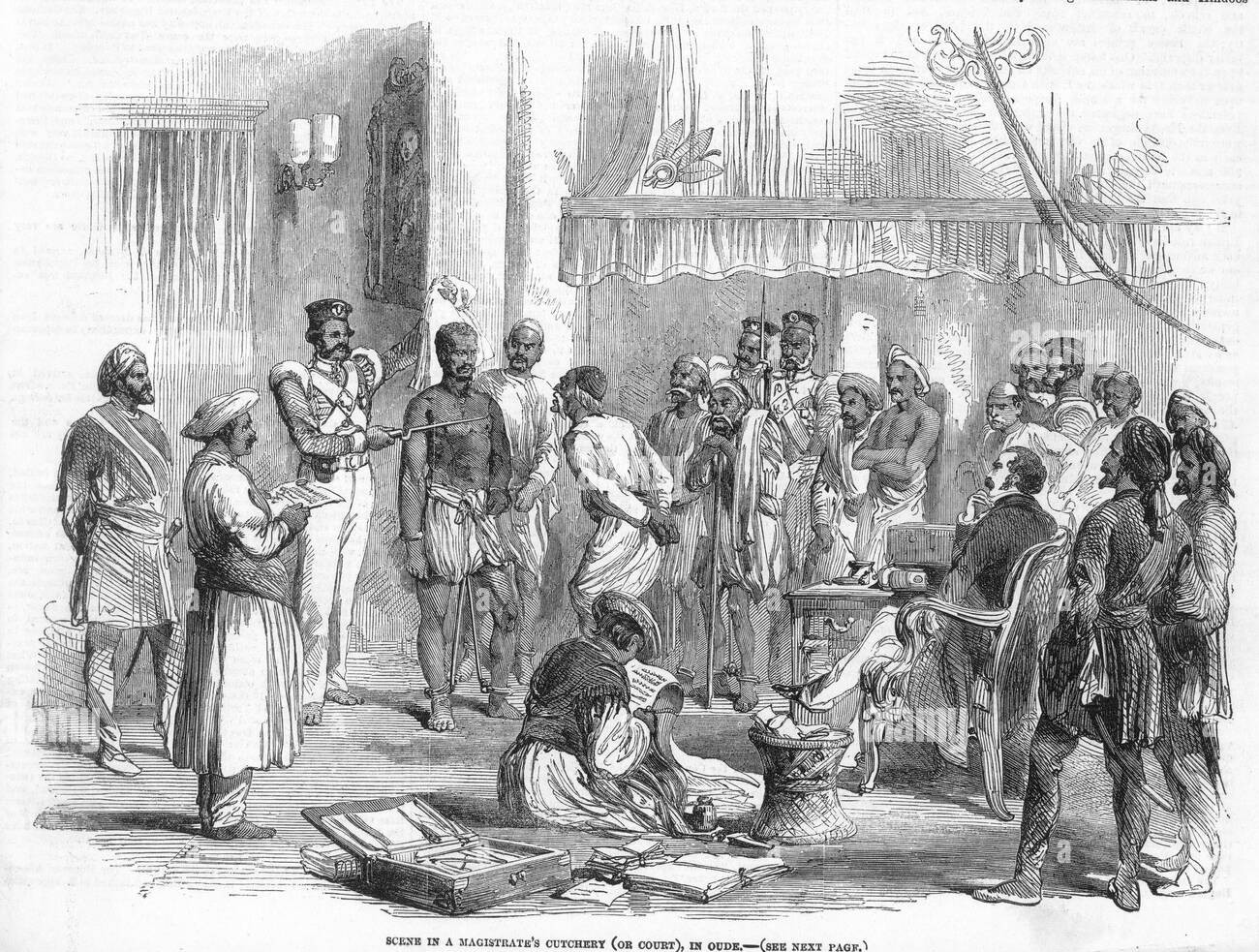
Illustration of an approver testifying against a Thug in Oudh, Illustrated London News 1853

Thugs were motivated to become approvers to avoid the death penalty, whereby they confessed to specific crimes and, after they were conditionally pardoned, provided depositions. Over 100 Thugs were accepted as approvers by Sleeman and his colleagues and approver testimony and interviews served as the British authorities' main source of information on the phenomenon. Wagner notes that, for their initial confession to be accepted, Thugs had to align with the interrogator's preconceived notions about the case.

Feringheea was returned to jail in 1832, while other approvers continued to travel the roads with their nujeeb escorts (mounted militiamen), hunting gangs they had personal knowledge of. They were temporarily freer as long as they remained useful and Dash suggests that at least a few of them might have levelled false accusations against innocent men to prolong this arrangement, as was suspected at the time.

==== Jubbulpore School of Industry ====
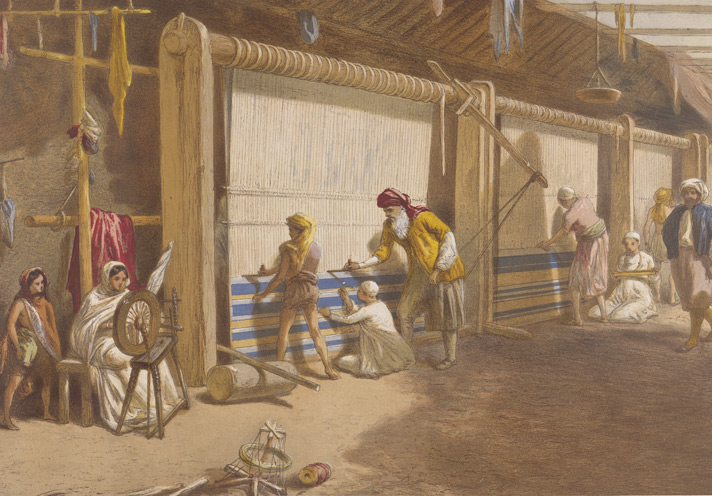
Chromolithograph of the Jubbulpore School of Industry by William Simpson, published in 1867. The School of Industry was presented as an innovative institution.

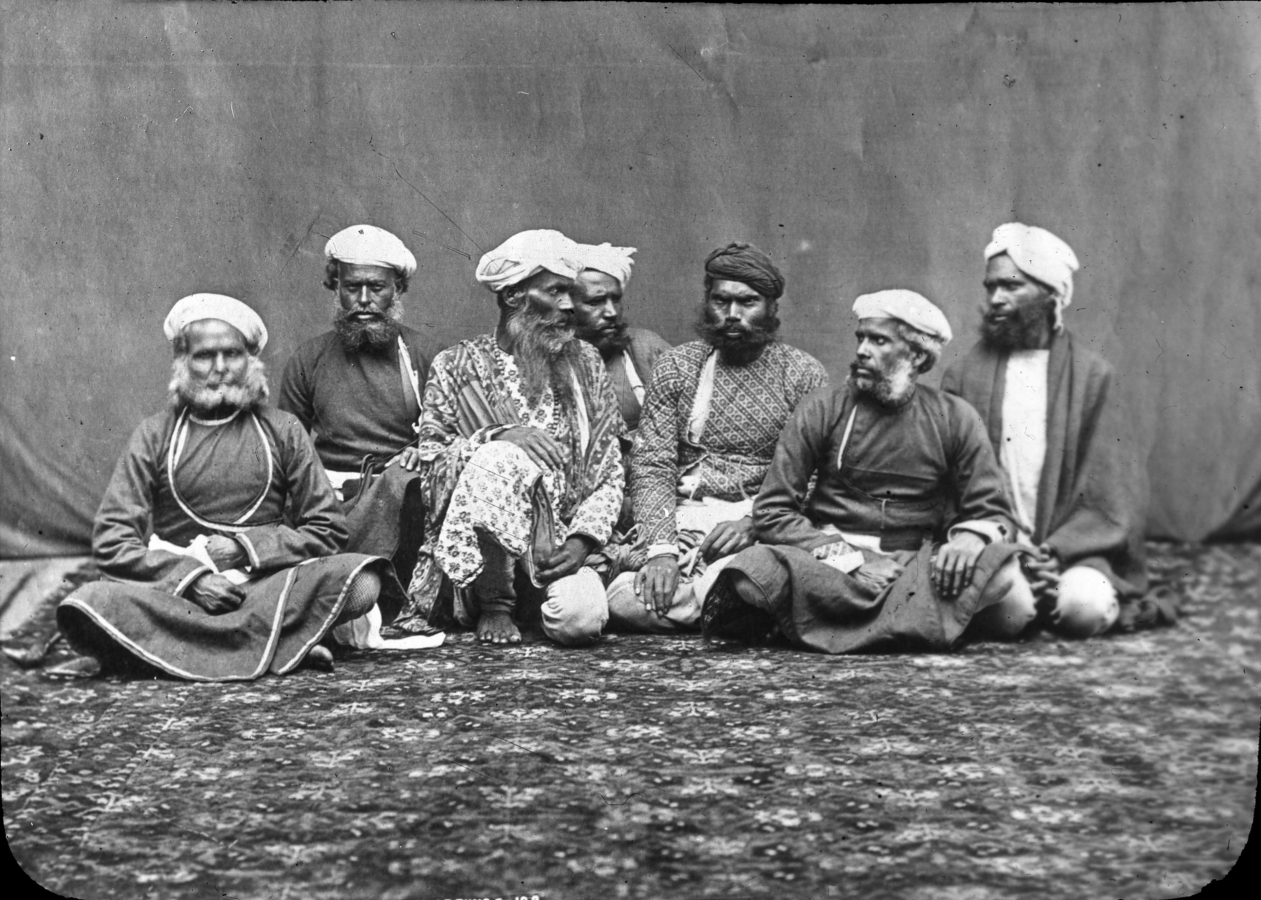
Thug prisoners, probably at Jubbulpore, sitting on a carpet they made, c. 1870

By the late 1830s, 56 approvers had been returned to Jubbulpore Central Jail, where they were kept in a lockup outside the prison gates away from the other inmates. Though the authorities believed that the approvers could not be reformed, the Jubbulpore School of Industry was established in 1837 as a manufactory where they and their families learnt trades. The approvers were employed in the manufactory compound and otherwise confined to a jail, separate from their families who were held under strict surveillance in a small walled village adjacent to the manufactory. They were generally allowed to meet their families only at mealtimes. In return for their work they received allowances that, after deductions for food and clothing, went to their families. Sons of the approvers were often employed with their fathers, while women assisted in spinning textiles. The School of Industry's first products were bricks, and it was able to become self-sustaining, selling into the Central Provinces markets where the cost of importing from elsewhere was prohibitive.

The approvers were later taught by artisans to make tents and carpets, and by 1847 produced 130 tents and 3,300 yards of Kidderminster carpet yearly. A carpet made by the Thugs was exhibited at the Great Exhibition in 1851 and they later made a 40 by 80 feet (12 m × 24 m) carpet for Queen Victoria that, as of 2005, remained on display in the Waterloo Chamber at Windsor Castle. Items made by the Thugs were also exhibited at the 1862 International Exhibition in London and the 1867 Exposition Universelle in Paris.

As of 1870, the institution housed 158 Thugs (mostly arrested in the 1840s and 1850s), 202 Dacoits, and over 1,500 wives and children. The productivity of the School declined heavily as the Thugs aged and by 1888 it was no longer making a profit. According to Sleeman, who visited the School three times between 1843 and 1848, the Thugs were initially keen to talk with visitors about their prior careers, but, following his last visit, he claimed that they had become ashamed of their past lives. By the start of the 20th century, the School of Industry had effectively ceased to exist and became a reformatory school for juvenile offenders.

== In popular culture ==
By the 1860s and 1870s, thuggee had become a fixture of Indian colonial lore and it inspired one of the most potent and longest lasting Orientalist tropes in literature and film. Kim A. Wagner places this within the broader context of exotic fascinations with the Assassins, African leopard men, witch doctors, and cannibals. The Thugs have tended to be portrayed in fiction as a sinister oriental sect, led by a fanatical leader and seeking to expel the British from India. By the latter half of the 19th century, writers such as Philip Meadows Taylor and Eugène Sue had cemented the popular image of Thugs as a religiously motivated cult, devoted to strangling their victims as a form of human sacrifice. In 1920, Sleeman's grandson James L. Sleeman published his book Thug: Or a Million Murders, by which time the Thugs were widely believed to have killed 40,000 to 50,000 people yearly over the course of seven centuries. (Note: In his book, James Sleeman stated: "And it is but right when British rule in India is so unfairly challenged and so unworthily attacked, that the extinction of this ancient religion of murder should be represented as yet another jewel in the crown of Empire.") Later depictions of this stereotype in 20th-century films ensured its popularity well into the postcolonial era. The word thug had made its way into everyday use in the English language by the 1860s and today simply means a violent person.

=== Literature ===
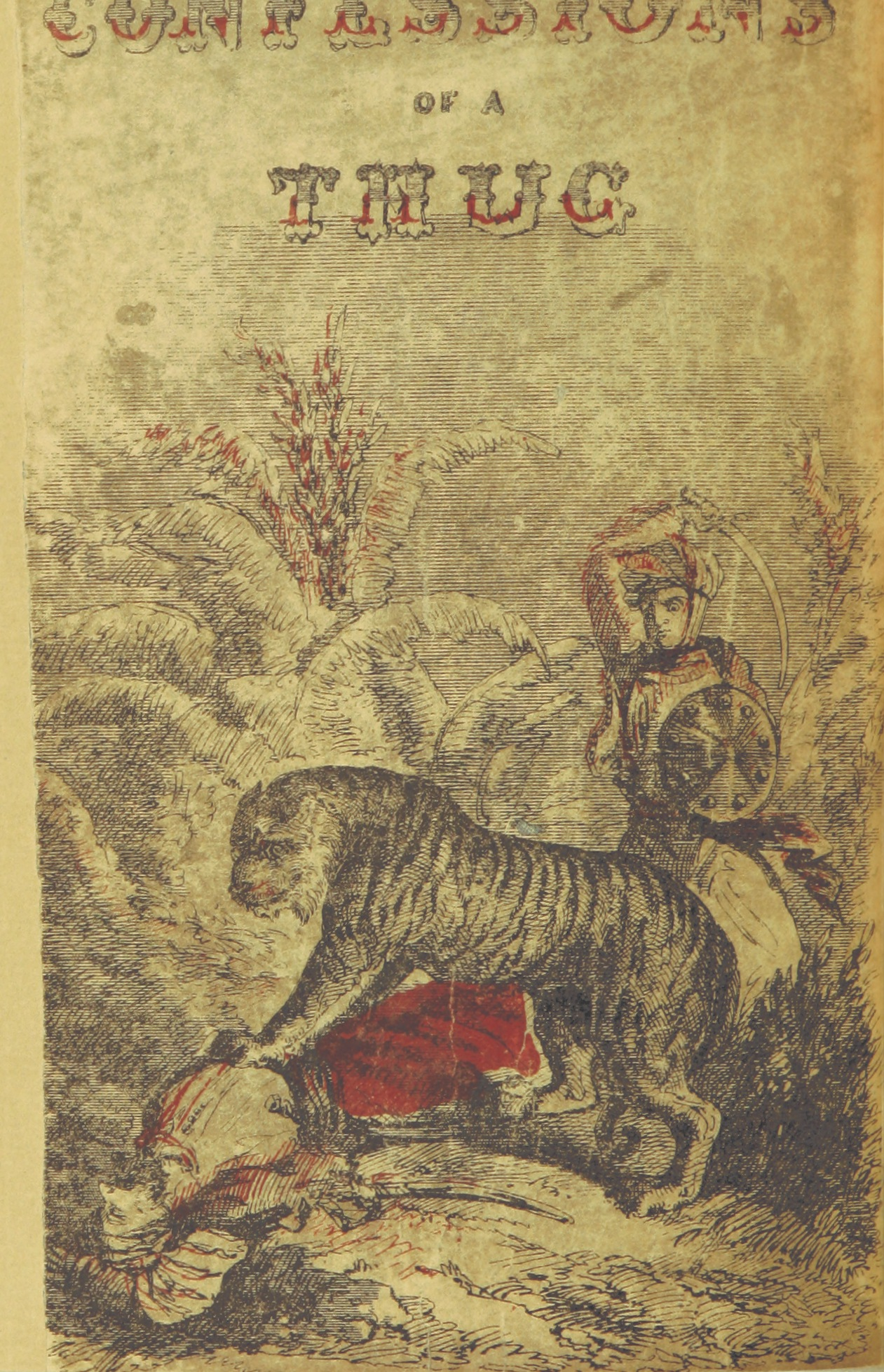
Cover of Confessions of a Thug

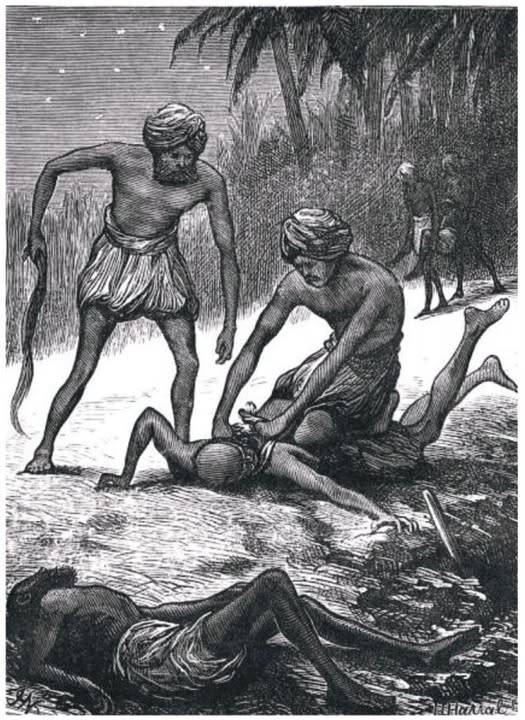
Illustration of thuggee in the 1883 edition

The 1826 novel Pandurang Hari, or Memoirs of a Hindoo by William Browne Hockley possibly constitutes the first depiction of thuggee in an English novel. In it, the Thugs are portrayed as cunning bandits who spare the lives of the protagonist and his companions. Taylor's 1839 novel Confessions of a Thug was largely based on Sleeman's writings and presents itself as a discovered manuscript on the confessions of Ameer Ali, a "real-life" thug-turned-approver. Ameer Ali recounts how he was kidnapped at a young age and initiated into the cult, also detailing thuggee customs and religious practices. The historical Sayyid Ameer Ali gave a deposition before Sleeman at Saugor in 1832, which, according to Wagner, only bears a "very slight resemblance" to Taylor's account. Based very loosely on several historical Thugs, Taylor's work dramatised Sleeman's interviews and, in contrast to depictions of thuggee from the late 19th century onwards, presented the Thugs sympathetically.

The 1844–1845 serial novel The Wandering Jew by Eugène Sue features a fictionalised version of Feringheea as chief of the Thugs, who are presented as products of the tyranny of Indian society and the exploitation of colonisers. The 1857–1858 novel Nena Sahib, oder: Die Empörung in Indien (Nana Sahib, or: The Uprising in India) by Hermann Goedsche sees Nana Saheb ally with the Thugs as a reaction to British greed and tyranny. Francisco Luís Gomes's 1866 novel Os Brâmanes (The Brahmans) centres on a Brahmin antagonist that becomes a Thug and later a mutineer. The 1877 novel Le Procès des Thugs (The Trial of Thugs) by René de Pont-Jest revolves around a spectacular trial of thuggee chief Feringheea, with the Thugs later allying with the Fenians against their British oppressors.

In his 1880 novel The Steam House, Jules Verne depicts Nana Saheb as being found in Bundelkhand among Thugs, Dacoits, and Pindaris. The 1886 novel Kalee's Shrine by Grant Allen and May Cotes sees the Anglo-Indian protagonist initiated into thuggee as a girl whereafter she is sent to England, possessed by Kali. In Sir Arthur Conan Doyle's 1887 short story "Uncle Jeremy's Household", Miss Warrender, the Anglo-Indian governess, is discovered to be a thuggee princess, orphaned after her father was killed during the 1857 uprising. Bram Stoker's 1890 short story "Gibbet Hill" centres on thuggee-like children attacking a traveller in England.

The second and fourth novels in Emilio Salgari's Sandokan series feature Thugs as the antagonists. The Mystery of the Black Jungle (1895) follows a Bengali hunter battling the Thugs to rescue his love interest. The Two Tigers (1904) is set against the backdrop of the Indian Rebellion of 1857. In it, Sandokan rescues his daughter from the Thugs, who have joined forces with the mutineers against the British. John Masters's 1952 novel The Deceivers, later adapted into a 1988 film, follows a British officer who goes undercover in a thuggee cult and participates in acts of thuggee. Phoenix Force had a novel Night of the Thuggee where the Thuggees were reenacted by the KGB to assassinate Americans in India. In the 2014 historical fiction novel The Strangler Vine by Miranda Carter, the protagonists encounter Sleeman's system for reclaiming suspected Thugs at Jubbulpore before becoming suspicious of his treatment of the native population.

=== Film ===
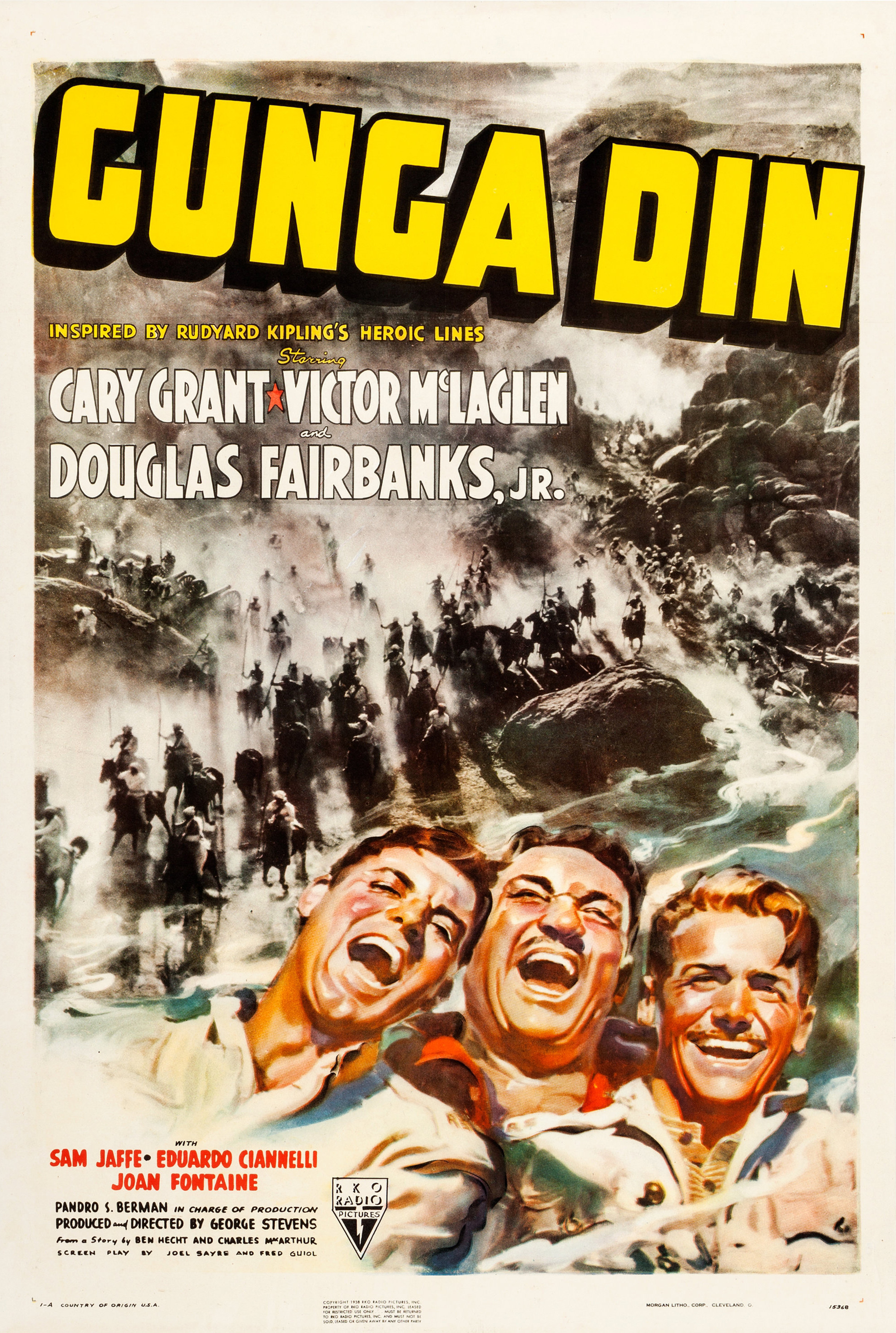
1938 poster for Gunga Din

The 1939 film Gunga Din was the first portrayal of thuggee in film and sees three British soldiers and a waterbearer (Gunga Din) come into conflict with a resurgent sect of thuggee cultists. The film is partly based on Rudyard Kipling's poem of the same name, as well as Soldiers Three, and ends with Kipling penning the first words of the poem after being saved by the three protagonists. The Thugs are depicted as worshippers of Kali and the film culminates in a battle between British troops and a Thug army seeking to overthrow British rule. In the 1959 film The Stranglers of Bombay, an officer of the East India Company investigates missing caravans and discovers and defeats a thuggee sect. The Thugs are depicted as being in conspiracy with a village leader. The film ends with a quote attributed to Sleeman: "If we have done nothing else for India, we have done this good thing."

The 1963 Mario Camerini films Kali Yug: Goddess of Vengeance and The Mystery of the Indian Temple feature Klaus Kinski as the leader of a thuggee cult. In the 1965 film Help!, The Beatles encounter a "Kahili"-worshipping ancient Indian cult, parodying prior portrayals of thuggee. Based on a short story by Mahasweta Devi, the 1968 Hindi film Sunghursh depicts a thuggee family and sees a Kali devotee attempt to pass his mantle on to his grandson, the protagonist.

The 1984 Steven Spielberg film Indiana Jones and the Temple of Doom, drawing inspiration from Gunga Din, features a fanatical thuggee cult based in a subterranean temple and led by the Kali priest Mola Ram. In the film, the "Thuggees [sic]" have stolen a lingam and use kidnapped children for slave labour in their mines. They aim to "massacre the British imperialists, crush the Muslims, and then cause the god of the Christians to crumble into dust". Though they sometimes attempt stranglings, the Thuggees bear no resemblance to the Thugs portrayed by 19th-century writers and rip out the hearts of their sacrificial victims. The 2018 Hindi film Thugs of Hindostan revolves around a band of Thugs that resist Company rule. The Thugs are portrayed as bandits that pounce upon their victims and are not presented as worshippers of Kali.

== Gallery ==
Watercolours prepared for Captain James Paton on the Thugs
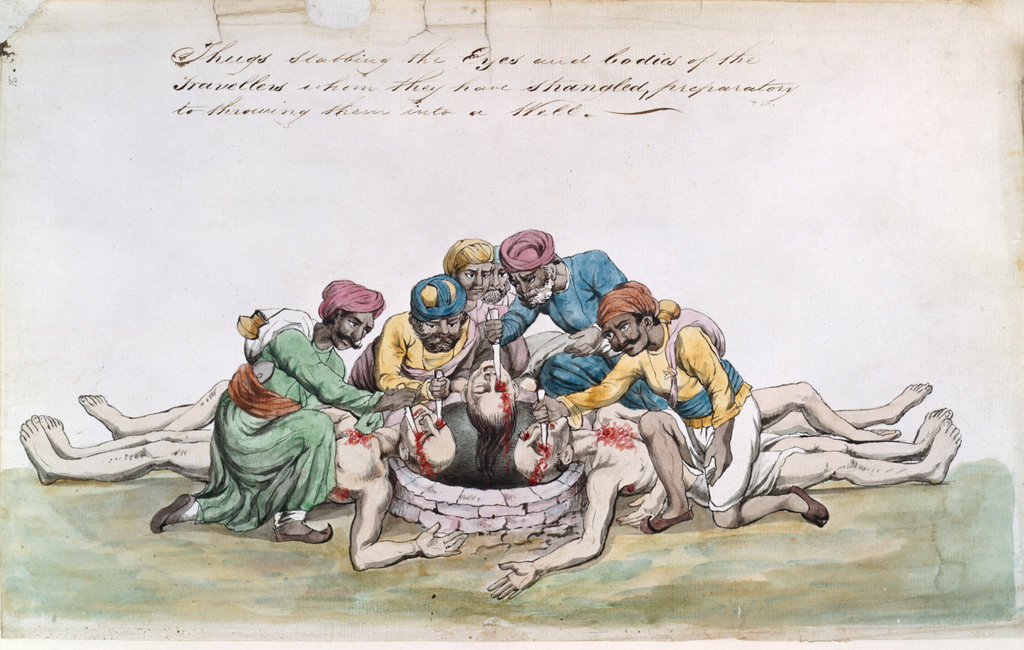
Thugs ensuring their victims are dead, c. 1837. These illustrations were prepared for Captain James Paton by an Indian artist and featured in an unpublished manuscript. According to notes in the margin, Paton had the artist redo another watercolour of Thugs burying their victims to be more gory.

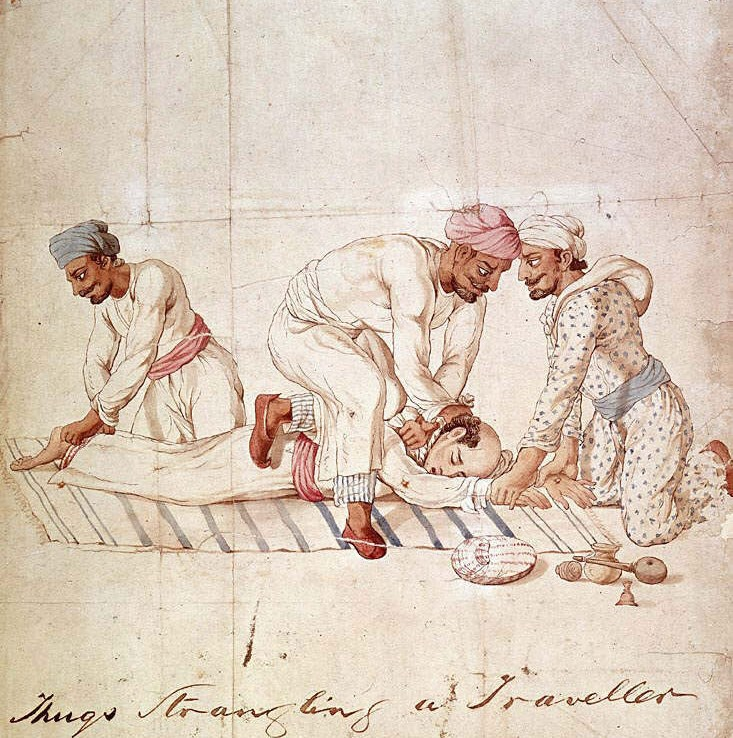
Thugs despatching a sleeping victim, inaccurately portrayed as European. Paton also requested that the victims in the burial watercolour be "made handsome to excite compassion and raise indignation against the assassins". According to Kim A. Wagner, this entailed giving them a lighter skin tone.

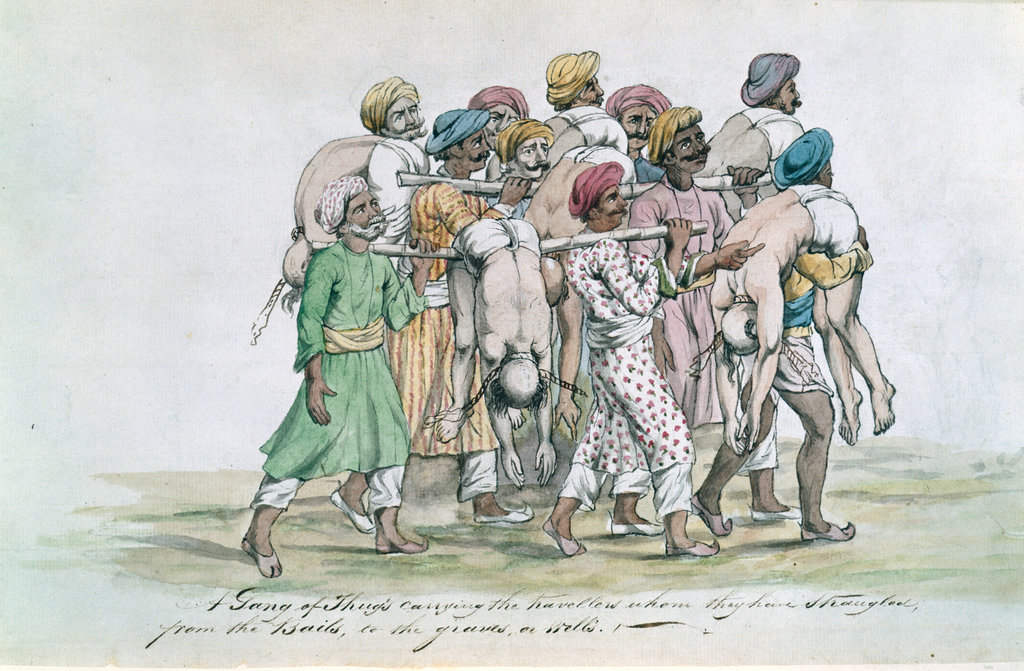
Thugs carrying the bodies of their strangled victims. Paton intended to publish the manuscript, entitled Collections on Thuggee and Dacoitee, and often showed it to visitors that came to Lucknow.

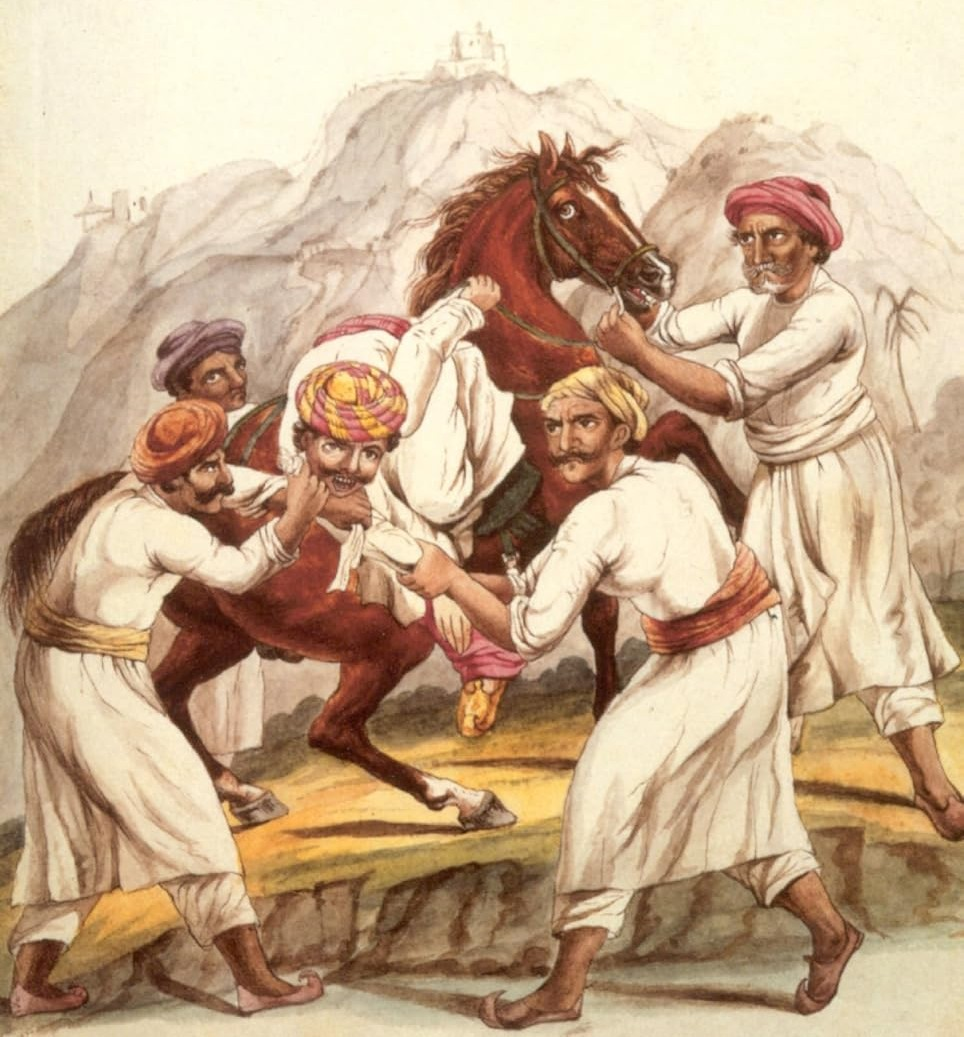
Thugs strangling a traveller on horseback. According to Wagner, the manuscript these watercolours adorned was characterised by an "aggressively Evangelical zeal". The approver interviews within were interspersed with Biblical quotations and lengthy reflections on the moral depravity of man.

== Bibliography ==
- Barkman, Adam; Sanna, Antonio (2022). "Introduction". A Critical Companion to Steven Spielberg. London: Lexington. pp. 1–36. ISBN 978-149-859-361-8.
- Brown, Mark (2003). "Ethnology and colonial administration in nineteenth-century British India: The question of native crime and criminality". The British Journal for the History of Science. 36 (2): 210–219. doi:10.1017/S0007087403005004. JSTOR 4028233.
- Brown, Mark (2014). Penal Power and Colonial Rule. Abingdon; New York: Routledge. ISBN 978-113-894-481-7.
- Browning, John Edgar (2025). "A Note on 'Gibbet Hill' and 'The Hues of [Imperial] Decay'". In McAlduff, Paul S.; Browning, John Edgar (eds.). Bram Stoker's Gibbet Hill and Other Lost Writings: An Anthology. Palgrave Macmillan. pp. xxv–xxxv. ISBN 978-3-031-83075-4.
- Chakraborty, Ayusman (2019). "Baagi or thagi? Representations of the Thugs in some mainstream commercial films". Literary Endeavour. 10 (2): 343–351. ISSN 0976-299X.
- Chakraborty, Ayusman (2020). "'Providential' campaigns: Intertwining thuggee and the Sepoy Mutiny in colonial fictions" (PDF). Rupkatha Journal on Interdisciplinary Studies in Humanities. 12 (4): 1–16. doi:10.21659/rupkatha.v12n4.12.
- Chakraborty, Ayusman (2021a). "Were Thugs of India religious terrorists or mere bandits? The evidence of Hockley's Pandurang Hari". Academia Letters (198): 2–3. doi:10.20935/AL198.
- Chakraborty, Ayusman (2021b). "Thuggee in England: Tracing the origin and development of fantasies of Thug-invasion and reverse colonization in late nineteenth century British fiction". Rupkatha Journal on Interdisciplinary Studies in Humanities. 13 (1). doi:10.21659/rupkatha.v13n1.12.
- Chatterjee, Amal (1998). Representations of India, 1740-1840: The Creation of India in the Colonial Imagination. Basingstoke: Palgrave Macmillan. ISBN 978-023-037-816-2.
- Dash, Mike (2005). Thug: The True Story of India's Murderous Cult. London: Granta. ISBN 978-1-86207-846-8.
- Fhlathúin, Máire ní (2001a). "The Travels of M. de Thévenot through the Thug Archive". Journal of the Royal Asiatic Society. 11 (1): 31–42. doi:10.1017/S135618630100013X. JSTOR 25188082.
- Fhlathúin, Máire ní (2001b). ""That solitary Englishman": W.H. Sleeman and the biography of British India". Victorian Review. 27 (1): 69–85. doi:10.1353/vcr.2001.0003.
- Finkelstein, David (1990). A study of the works of Philip Meadows Taylor (PhD thesis). University of Edinburgh.
- Fujiwara, Chris (2019). "Gothic Journeys: Travel and Transportation in the Films of Terence Fisher". In Bayman, Louis; Pinazza, Natália (eds.). Journeys on Screen: Theory, Ethics, Aesthetics (PDF). Edinburgh University Press. pp. 199–214. ISBN 978-147-442-184-3.
- Griffiths, Percival (1971). To Guard My People: The History of the Indian Police. London; Bombay: Ernest Benn; Allied Publishers. ISBN 978-051-026-942-5.
- Humes, Cynthia Ann (2003). "Wrestling with Kālī: South Asian and British Constructions of the Dark Goddess". In McDermott, Rachel Fell; Kripal, Jeffrey J. (eds.). Encountering Kali: In the Margins, at the Center, in the West (PDF). Berkeley; Los Angeles; London: University of California Press. pp. 145–168. ISBN 978-052-023-240-2.
- Kumar, Mukul (2004). "Relationship of caste and crime in colonial India: A discourse analysis". Modern Asian Studies. 39 (10): 1078–1087. JSTOR 4414739.
- Lloyd, Tom (2006). "Acting in the "theatre of Anarchy": The "anti-thug campaign" and elaborations of colonial rule in early nineteenth-century India" (PDF). Edinburgh Papers in South Asian Studies (19): 1–50. ISBN 978-190-079-520-3.
- Lo Turco, Bruno (2014). "Il cuore nero dell'India: omicidi rituali e stereotipi letterari" [The Black Heart of India: Ritual Murders and Literary Stereotypes]. In Calanchi, Alessandria (ed.). Arcobaleno noir. Genesi, diaspora e nuove cittadinanze del noir fra cinema e letteratura [Noir Rainbow. Genesis, Diaspora, and New Citizenships of Noir in Film and Literature.] (in Italian). Giulianova: Galaad. pp. 203–230. ISBN 978-889-522-796-2.
- Macfie, Alexander Lyon (2008). "Thuggee: an orientalist construction?". Rethinking History. 12 (3): 383–397. doi:10.1080/13642520802193262.
- Perris, Jonathan (2025). ""Thuggee in London!": Metropolitan sensationalism and the invention of the Thug". Victorian Literature and Culture. 53 (2): 207–232. doi:10.1017/S1060150325000014.
- Piliavsky, Anastasia (2013). "The Moghia menace, or the watch over watchmen in British India". Modern Asian Studies. 47 (3): 751–779. doi:10.1017/S0026749X11000643. JSTOR 24494166.
- Piliavsky, Anastasia (2015). "The "criminal tribe" in India before the British". Comparative Studies in Society and History. 57 (2): 323–354. doi:10.1017/S0010417515000055.
- Rawat, Maneesh; Mukherjee, Jenia (2025). "'Discipline and punish': A historical account on the Jubbulpore School of Industry in Central India". Journal of the Asiatic Society. 67 (1): 1–22.
- Roy, Parama (1998). "Discovering India, Imagining Thuggee". Indian Traffic: Identities in Question and Postcolonial India. Berkeley; Los Angeles; London: University of California Press. pp. 41–70. ISBN 987-654-321-0.
- Shumsky, Susan (2022). The Inner Light: How India Influenced the Beatles. New York City: Simon and Schuster. ISBN 978-168-261-978-0.
- Singha, Radhika (1993). "'Providential' circumstances: The thuggee campaign of the 1830s and legal innovation". Modern Asian Studies. 27 (1): 83–146. doi:10.1017/S0026749X00016085. JSTOR 312879.
- Singha, Radhika (1998). A Despotism of Law: Crime and Justice in Early Colonial India. Delhi: Oxford University Press. ISBN 978-019-564-049-6.
- Van Woerkens, Martine (2002). The Strangled Traveler: Colonial Imaginings and the Thugs of India. Translated by Tihanyi, Catherine. Chicago, London: University of Chicago Press. ISBN 978-022-685-086-3. Originally published in 1995 as Le voyageur étranglé: L'Inde des Thugs, le colonialisme et l'imaginaire (in French).
- Wagner, Kim A. (2004). "The deconstructed stranglers: A reassessment of thuggee". Modern Asian Studies. 38 (4): 931–963. doi:10.1017/S0026749X04001258. JSTOR 3876674.
- Wagner, Kim A. (2007a). Thuggee: Banditry and the British in Early Nineteenth-Century India. New York: Palgrave Macmillan. ISBN 978-0-230-59020-5.
- Wagner, Kim A. (2007b). "Thuggee and social banditry reconsidered". The Historical Journal. 50 (2): 353–376. doi:10.1017/S0018246X07006103. JSTOR 4140134.
- Wagner, Kim A. (2012). "'In Unrestrained Conversation': Approvers and the Colonial Ethnography of Crime in Nineteenth-Century India". In Roque, Ricardo; Wagner, Kim A. (eds.). Engaging Colonial Knowledge: Reading European Archives in World History. London: Palgrave Macmillan. pp. 135–162. doi:10.1057/9780230360075. ISBN 978-1-349-31766-0.
- Wagner, Kim A. (2022). ""Thugs and Assassins," "New Terrorism" and the Resurrection of Colonial Knowledge". In Dietze, Carola; Verhoeven, Claudia (eds.). The Oxford Handbook of the History of Terrorism. Oxford University Press. pp. 127–147. doi:10.1093/oxfordhb/9780199858569.013.006. ISBN 978-019-985-856-9.
