= Philip Durham Henderson =

Major-General Philip Durham Henderson, CSI (19 August 1840 – 19 April 1918) was a British Indian Army officer who served as the British Resident in Mysore from 1892 to 1895.

== Biography ==
Henderson was the second son of Major-General R. Henderson, Royal Engineers. He was educated at a private school, and joined the 2nd Madras Cavalry in 1857. He became an attaché in 1870 and Under-Secretary to the Foreign Department of the Government of India in 1872. He was sent to Cashmere on special duty in 1874 and was appointed General Superintendent of operations for the suppression of Thuggee and Dacoity in 1878. He became Resident in Mysore in 1892, and left India in 1895. He died in London in 1918.

He was appointed a CSI for services on the staff of the Prince of Wales (later King Edward VII) during his visit to India in 1875–1876.

He married in 1864 Rose Cherry, second daughter of Lieutenant-General P. Cherry of the Madras Cavalry; they had two sons and two daughters.
