= Department of Criminal Intelligence =

British Indian intelligence agency

Agency overview
- Formed: April 1904
- Preceding agency: Thagi and Dakaiti Department
- Superseding agency: Intelligence Bureau
- Type: Intelligence agency
- Jurisdiction: British India
- Status: Superseded
- Headquarters: Shimla, British India
- Agency executive: Director; Deputy Director
- Parent department: Home Department

The Department of Criminal Intelligence (DCI), originally called Central Criminal Intelligence Department (CCID), was the central foreign and domestic intelligence agency of the Government of India during the British Raj. It was established by Lord Curzon, the then Viceroy of India, based on the Indian Police Commission report submitted on 30 May 1903 under the chairmanship of Andrew Henderson Leith Fraser, which examined and recommended reforms in Indian police system. Sir Harold Stuart was appointed as the first director of DIC. Curzon also established Criminal Investigation Departments (CID) in all provinces of British India.

DCI later became the Intelligence Bureau.
