= George Swinton (botanist) =

Scottish civil servant and botanist

George Swinton FRSE (1780–1854) was a Scottish civil servant who served as Chief Secretary to the British government during their colonial rule of India. During this time he was also a noted botanist.

== Life ==
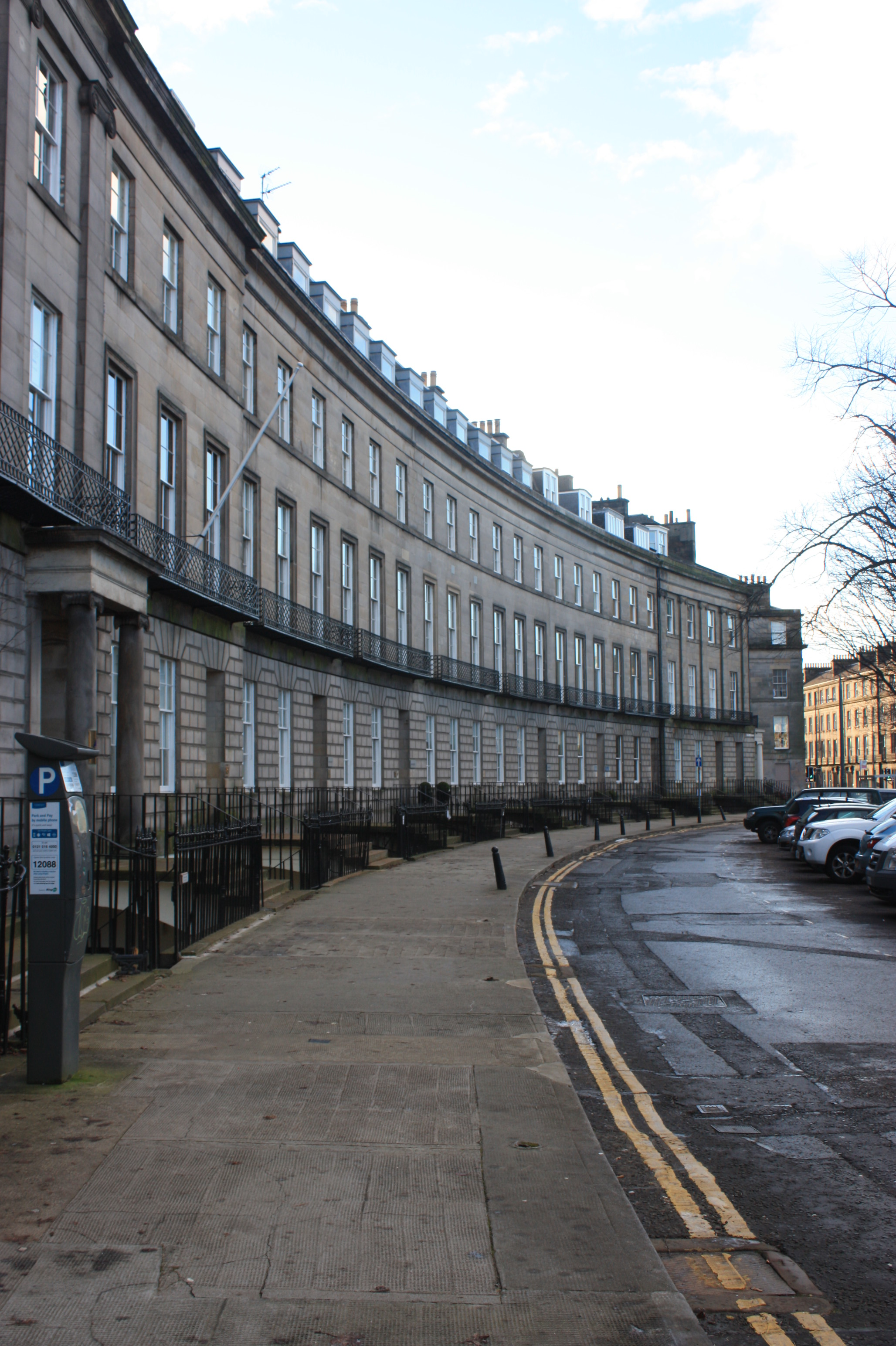
Atholl Crescent in Edinburgh

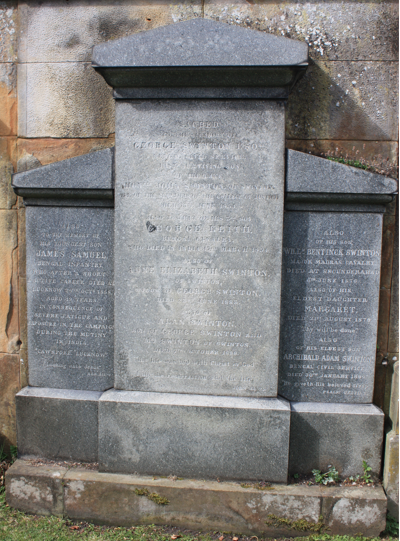
The grave of George Swinton, Dean Cemetery

He was born on 5 November 1780 the fifth son of John Swinton, Lord Swinton and his wife, Margaret Mitchelson of Middleton. They lived at the family estate of Swinton House in Berwickshire.

In 1802 he became a Writer (lawyer) to the East India Company in India. In 1814 he became "Persian Secretary" to the Governor General of India. In 1826 he took on the additional role of caring for the Botanical Gardens and began collecting plants for Nathaniel Wallich. He was made Chief Secretary of Bengal in 1827.

In 1827 he was elected a Fellow of the Royal Society of Edinburgh. His proposer was Sir David Brewster.

From 1827 to 1833 he was Chief Secretary to the Government, based in Calcutta. He was also President of the Indian Board of Trade. In 1833 he donated seven skulls of "thugs and stranglers of central India" to the Phrenological Society of Edinburgh.

He retired in 1833 and lived his later life at 4 Atholl Crescent in Edinburgh's West End. to 13 Great Stuart Street on the Moray Estate in west Edinburgh. He died there on 17 June 1854. He is buried in Dean Cemetery.

== Family ==
He married his cousin, Anne Elizabeth Swinton (d.1883). They had seven children.

His son, James Samuel Swinton, served with the Bengal Infantry and died during the Siege of Lucknow in 1858.

His son, William Bentinck Swinton, was a Major in the Madras Cavalry and died at Secunderabad in 1876.

== Publications ==
- Papa's Keepsake (a private printing as a gift to his children)
