= Percival Griffiths =

British-born Indian businessman and administrator (1899–1992)

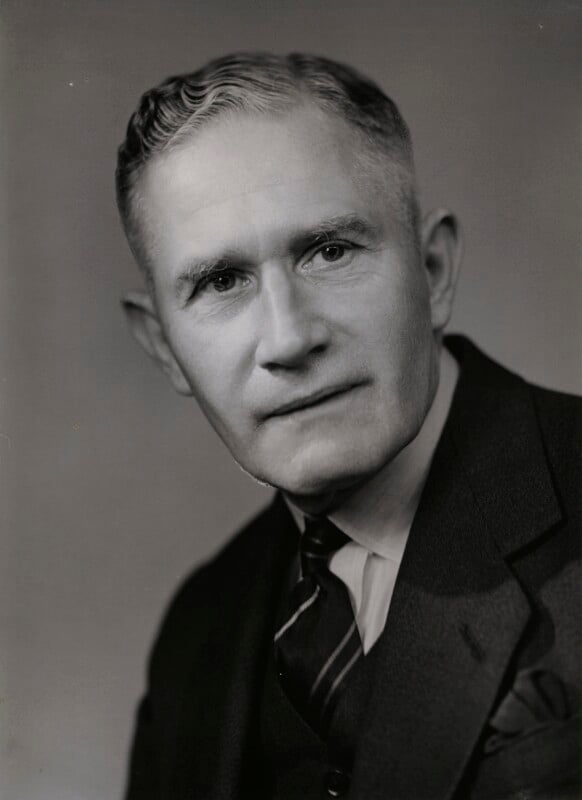
Griffiths in 1951

Sir Percival Joseph Griffiths KBE CIE (15 January 1899 – 14 July 1992) was a prominent businessman who also worked for the Indian Civil Service.

== Career ==
Griffiths passed M.A from Cambridge. A large part of his service career was spent in eastern India. Griffiths took the charge of District Magistrate of undivided Medinipur, West Bengal in 1933. He retired from the service in 1937 while deputy commissioner in Darjeeling. Apart from his working knowledge in European languages, he was fluent in Bengali and also knew Hindi, Urdu, Tibetan, Nepalese, and Sanskrit. After retirement he stayed in India and acted as representative for European businesses. He was knighted in 1947 and became adviser to the Indian and Pakistan Tea Association.

== Books ==
He was a prolific writer and pamphleteer. Some of his prominent publications include:

- The British Impact on India (1952)
- Modern India (1957)
- The History of the Indian Tea Industry (1967)
- To Guard my People (1971)
- A Licence to Trade: A History of the English Chartered Companies (1974)
- A History of the Inchcape Group (1977)
- Vignettes of India (1985)
