= Devonshire (disambiguation) =

Devonshire is a historical name for Devon, a ceremonial county in South West England.

Devonshire may also refer to:

== Places ==
=== Settlements ===
- Devonshire, Blackpool, a district of Blackpool, Lancashire, England
- Devonshire, Dallas, a neighborhood of Dallas, Texas, US
- Devonshire Parish, Bermuda
- Devonshire Quarter, Sheffield, UK

=== Streets ===
- Devonshire Place, City of Westminster, London
- Devonshire Street, City of Westminster, London

=== Structures ===
- Devonshire Buildings, two apartment buildings in Barrow-in-Furness, Cumbria, UK
- Devonshire House, Piccadilly, Mayfair, London, UK
- Devonshire Mall, Windsor, Ontario, Canada
- The Devonshire, a historic apartment building in Indianapolis, Indiana, US
- State (MBTA station), previously Devonshire station, in Boston, Massachusetts, US
- Devonshire Green, a small public park in Sheffield, UK
- Devonshire Park Theatre, a Victorian theatre in Eastbourne, UK

== People ==
=== Nobility ===
- Countess of Devonshire (disambiguation)
- Duchess of Devonshire (disambiguation)
- Duke of Devonshire
- Earl of Devonshire

=== Surname ===
- Alan Devonshire (born 1956), English footballer
- Ben Devonshire (1972–2017), English weightlifter
- Henriette Devonshire (1864–1949), French translator and travel writer
- Jane Devonshire (born 1966), British chef
- John Devonshire (1774–1839), English naval officer
- Les Devonshire (1926–2012), English footballer
- MJ Devonshire (born 2000), American football player
- Pip Devonshire (born 1966), New Zealand weaver

== Ships ==
- Devonshire (East Indiaman), ships of the name
- Devonshire class cruiser (disambiguation), two classes of Royal Navy ships
- HMS Devonshire, ships of the name

== Other uses ==
- Devonshire manuscript, a 16th-century book of verses
- Devonshire Ministry (disambiguation)
- Devonshire Street Cemetery a reclaimed graveyard in Sydney NSW
- Turkey Devonshire, or simply Devonshire, a type of sandwich

== See also ==
- Devon (disambiguation)
