= Thug Behram =

Indian serial killer

- Born: c. 1775
- Other name: Buhram Jemadar
- Occupation: Thuggee gang leader
- Years active: c. 1790s–1832
- Known for: Alleged murder count, turning King's evidence
- Conviction: Thuggee
- Penalty: Life imprisonment in irons
- Reward amount: 100 Rupees
- Wanted by: British East India Company

Details
- Victims: Confessed to 125
- Locations: Oudh State, Indian subcontinent
- Target: Travellers
- Date apprehended: c. 1835–1836

Thug Behram (born c. 1775), contemporarily known as Burham Jemadar, was a thuggee gang leader active in Oudh during the late 18th and early 19th centuries. He holds the Guinness World Record for "most prolific murderer" with over 931 murders, though historians have disputed this figure as improbable and he only confessed to having personally strangled 125 victims.

== Biography ==
By the 1830s, Buhram was a thuggee jemadar (gang leader) and had been active for 40 years. He remained at large as late as 1832, carrying out expeditions in Oudh. According to the 1837 testimony of Ramzan, a Thug-turned-approver captured in 1835 and who had worked under Buhram, he was asked by East India Company officials if he could point out Buhram, upon whom the British had placed a Rs 100 reward. (Note: According to Mike Dash, this would have had a value equivalent to £1,500 in 2004.) That night, Ramzan led eight sepoys to Buhram's house in the village of Sohanee. Buhram came out to greet him and, while warming himself up by a fire that Ramzan had lit, he was surrounded and seized by the guards. He immediately confessed to being a Thug and pledged to cooperate.

In Buhram's first deposition in 1836, Captain James Paton, the Assistant Resident at Lucknow and in charge of the Anti-Thuggee Campaign in Oudh from the mid-1830s, quotes him as confessing: "I may have strangled with my own hands about 125 men, and I may have seen strangled 150 more". A year later, Paton quoted him as having "been present" at 931 murders. Paton described Buhram in 1840 as "a notorious leader of assassins", aged 60 or 70, who for his age and "energy of character is looked up to by all the other Thugs". He further described Buhram as "one of the best approvers". In Buhram's interviews with Paton at Lucknow, he emphasised the status of Thugs: "The Thug is the Badshah! King of all these classes!". On the subject of other robbers, Paton recorded Buhram as responding:

with his usual great animation, 'a chor! a thief! (here he imitated a skulking thief) but a Thug! (rising with animation) rides his horse! wears his dagger! And shews affront! 'choree na! Kubbee nyhen!' thieving! never! never! If a bankers' treasure were before me, and entrusted to my care, though in hunger, and dying, I would spurn to steal! but let a banker go on a journey, and I would certainly, ('albutta') murder him! but not a Mahajun whom I knew; (indignantly) I despise a Dacoit! a robber! ('pajee!') contemptible! let him come before me! 'our Keea!' (what else!)

In 1837, Buhram was tried before Colonel John Low, the Resident at Lucknow, and sentenced to life imprisonment in irons.

=== Number of murders ===
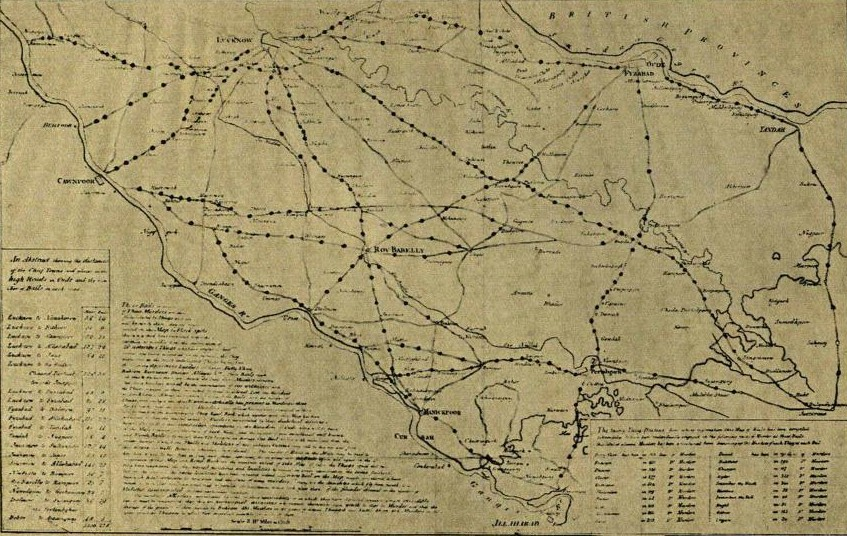
Paton's map of thuggee expeditions in Oudh (Note: Sleeman attributed the map to his grandfather, removing any mention of Paton.)

On an 1838 map of thuggee activity in the Kingdom of Oudh, Paton ascribed to Buhram's gangs "931 Murders in 40 years of actual Thuggee", with an average of "about two murders monthly". James L. Sleeman (grandson of William Henry Sleeman, the General Superintendent of the Thuggee Department) begins his 1933 book Thug: Or a Million Murders with his grandfather learning incredulously of Buhram's supposed murder count of 931. (Note: In his writing, Sleeman suppressed Paton's role in the campaign in favour of his grandfather.) In Sleeman's invented account, which he presented as "fact", Buhram responds: "Sahib, there were many more, but I was so intrigued in luring them to destruction that I ceased counting when certain of my thousand victims". Guinness World Records holds Buhram to be the most prolific murderer in history, claiming that he strangled at least 931 people between 1790 and 1840.

Mike Dash notes that, spread across the four decades of Buhram's career and taking into account that Thugs were rarely active outside the cold season, this would require there to have been 24 deaths a year over four months, or one murder every five days of his career. Taking this together with various thuggee depositions that suggest the whole process of luring and killing their victims often took more than 20 days to complete, Dash finds this improbable. Paton never addressed the discrepancy between this and Buhram's earlier confession to having been involved in 275 murders, personally strangling 125 of them. Kim A. Wagner describes Buhram's claim to have been involved in 931 murders as a brag.

== See also ==
- List of serial killers before 1900
- Feringheea

== Bibliography ==
- Dash, Mike (2005). Thug: The True Story of India's Murderous Cult. London: Granta. ISBN 978-1-86207-846-8.
- Fhlathúin, Máire ní (2001). ""That solitary Englishman": W.H. Sleeman and the biography of British India". Victorian Review. 27 (1): 1–13. doi:10.1353/vcr.2001.0003.
- Paton, James (1840). "Expedition of the Oude Gangs". In Sleeman, William Henry (ed.). Report on the depredations committed by the Thug gangs of upper and central India, from the cold season of 1836-37, down to their gradual suppression, under the operation of the measures adopted against them by the supreme government, in the year 1839. Calcutta: G. H. Huttman, Bengal Military Orphan Press. pp. 126–184.
- Sleeman, James L. (1933). Thug: Or a Million Murders. London: S. Low, Marston & Company Limited.
- Wagner, Kim A. (2007). Thuggee: Banditry and the British in Early Nineteenth-Century India. New York: Palgrave Macmillan. ISBN 978-0-230-59020-5.
- Wagner, Kim A. (2012). "'In Unrestrained Conversation': Approvers and the Colonial Ethnography of Crime in Nineteenth-Century India". In Roque, Ricardo; Wagner, Kim A. (eds.). Engaging Colonial Knowledge: Reading European Archives in World History. London: Palgrave Macmillan. pp. 135–162. ISBN 978-1-349-31766-0.
