= Confessions of a Thug (novel) =

1839 novel by Philip Meadows Taylor

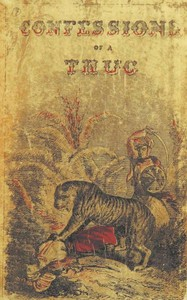
- An 1858 edition cover
- Author: Philip Meadows Taylor
- Language: English
- Genre: Historical fiction
- Publisher: Richard Bentley
- Publication date: 1839
- Publication place: United Kingdom
- Media type: Print (Hardback & Paperback)
- Pages: 552 pp

Confessions of a Thug is an English novel written by Philip Meadows Taylor in 1839 based on the Thuggee cult in India. It was a best-seller in 19th-century Britain, becoming the British Empire's most sensational ethnographic fiction in the first half of the 19th century; its avid readers included Queen Victoria. It was one of the best-selling crime novels of the 19th century, and was the most influential novel about India prior to Rudyard Kipling's Kim (1901). The novel's popularity established the word thug in the English language.

== Plot ==
The plot revolves around a fictional anti-hero protagonist, Ameer Ali, a Shia thug. This book is a tale of crime and retribution in India, beginning in the late 18th century and ending in 1832. The story depicts the practices of the Thugs, or "deceivers" as they were called, who murdered travellers for money and valuables. This work was originally published in 1839 and reprinted in 1873.

== Characters ==
- Ameer Ali: The novel's protagonist, a Pathan (Pashtun) Muslim adopted and raised by a thug. After becoming a prominent jemadar, he and his father relocate to Jhalone and gain the confidence of the local ruler, Raja Govindrao II.
- The Englishman: Ameer Ali's interlocutor and a stand-in for Phillip Meadows Taylor. His interviews of Ameer Ali provides a frame for the narrative of the novel. The Englishman describes the physical appearance of Ameer Ali in his imprisonment and will occasionally express moral outrage at some part of the tale, or otherwise offer criticism.
- Ismail: The adopted father of Ameer Ali. A respected and high-ranking Muslim thug, he is childless and adopts Ameer Ali. During the first half of the story, Ismail and his family live in a small village near Nagpur.
- Bhudrinath: A Hindu thug and early peer of Ameer Ali. He is an expert in the religious ceremonies of the Thuggee faction.
- Peer Khan: A Muslim thug and another close ally of Ameer Ali. He retires from thuggee to become a fakir.
- Gunesha: A prominent Hindu thug of Ismail's generation. He serves as Ameer Ali's antagonist in the second half of the story.
- Cheetoo: A prominent leader of pindari expeditions. Ameer Ali and several thugs join him as mercenary soldiers.

== Historicity ==
Ameer Ali, the fictional anti-hero protagonist of Confessions of a Thug, is a composite of multiple real-life thugs: Feringheea, Ameer Alee, and Aman Subahdar. Feringheea was a jamadar, or gang leader, and led many expeditions before turning into a prolific informer for the British. The historical Ameer Alee, who provided the fictional character's name, was a thuggee gang leader mentioned only twice by William Henry Sleeman in his definitive work on the gangs. Ameer Ali gave a deposition before Sleeman at Saugor in 1832, which, according to Kim A. Wagner, only bears a "very slight resemblance" to Taylor's account. Finally, Aman Subahdar was described by Sleeman as "the foremost thug of his day," but died before the events of the novel conclude. One scene in the novel, in which a thug band led by Ameer Ali suffers a misfortune, is lifted almost word-for-word from Sleeman's book. In the historical version, Aman Subahdar led the expedition. Further, Feringheea and Aman Subahdar were cousins but no such comparable character exists in the novel.

== Publishing history ==
Originally published by Richard Bentley in three volumes in 1839, a second edition followed in 1840 and another in 1858. Henry S. King published a single-volume edition in 1873, and a new edition appeared from Kegan Paul, Trench & Co. in 1885. Oxford University Press first printed it in 1916 for their World's Classics series, with an introduction by C. W. Stewart. Francis Yeats-Brown edited an edition for Eyre & Spottiswoode in 1938. More recently editions have appeared from publisher Anthony Blond in the "Doughty Library" series (1967) and the Folio Society (1974), with illustrations by Clarke Hutton.

== See also ==
- Thug Behram
- Thugs of Hindostan
