= Thugs of Hindostan =

2018 Indian film by Vijay Krishna Acharya

- Theatrical release poster
- Directed by: Vijay Krishna Acharya
- Written by: Vijay Krishna Acharya
- Produced by: Aditya Chopra
- Starring: Amitabh Bachchan; Aamir Khan; Katrina Kaif; Fatima Sana Shaikh
- Cinematography: Manush Nandan
- Edited by: Ritesh Soni; Namrata Rao
- Music by: Songs: Ajay–Atul; Score: John Stewart Eduri
- Production company: Yash Raj Films
- Distributed by: Yash Raj Films (India); Phars Film (International)
- Release date: 8 November 2018
- Running time: 166 minutes
- Country: India
- Language: Hindi
- Budget: ₹200–300 crore (Note: NDTV and Zee Business stated the budget as ₹200 crore. Scroll.in published that the budget varies in the range ₹200–300 crore. Bollywood Hungama mentioned the budget as ₹220 crore. While The Hindustan Times and News 18, reported the budget as ₹300 crore.)
- Box office: est. ₹322.07 crore

Thugs of Hindostan is a 2018 Indian Hindi-language period action adventure film directed by Vijay Krishna Acharya and produced by Aditya Chopra under Yash Raj Films. The film stars Amitabh Bachchan, Aamir Khan, Katrina Kaif (in an extended cameo), Fatima Sana Shaikh, Mohammed Zeeshan Ayyub, Ronit Roy and Lloyd Owen. Set during the period of Company's expansion in India, Firangi Mallah, a small-time thug from Awadh, is sent by an East India Company official to infiltrate and counter a band of thugs.

Produced at an estimated budget of ₹200 crore (US$29.24 million) – ₹300 crore (US$43.87 million), Thugs of Hindostan is one of the most expensive Bollywood films. Initially titled Thug, the film marked the first time Khan and Bachchan featured together as lead actors. The film was the second collaboration between Khan, Acharya and Kaif after Dhoom 3, and between Khan and Shaikh after the latter's debut in Dangal. Principal photography commenced on 5 June 2017 in Malta and continued in Thailand, Morocco and Mehrangarh. It was put on a short hiatus after Bachchan was injured on the set. Filming concluded in March 2018, with the final schedule in Rajasthan. The soundtrack was composed by Ajay–Atul, with lyrics written by Amitabh Bhattacharya, while John Stewart Eduri composed the musical score.

Thugs of Hindostan was released on 8 November 2018, during the week of the Diwali festival, and received negative reviews from critics. The film grossed ₹335 crore ($35 million) at the worldwide box office. The film was released in China on 28 December 2018, where a special edition, edited by Aamir Khan, was released with a shorter run-time than the original version.

== Plot ==
In 1795, when the Indian subcontinent was known as Hindustan or Hindostan, King Mirza Sikander Baig is killed by John Clive. The residents of his kingdom are massacred, and the land is annexed by Lord Clive of the East India Company. The only survivors are his daughter, Zafira Baig, and general, Khudabaksh. Khudabaksh defeats the retreating enemy soldiers, and raises Zafira as his daughter, training her in the arts of warfare.

In 1806 (11 years later), Firangi Mallah is a small-time thug who fools people for money. For instance, he once gives the location of a travelling landlord to some thugs and takes money for it. Then he gives the location of the same thugs to British soldiers for money. Firangi turns into a routine informer for the company. Firangi aims to be a European himself (hence the moniker "Firangi"), and hence dresses up as one in many circumstances.

Khudabaksh, now known as Azaad, leads a band of Indian bandits known as Thugs, who specialise in sea-based warfare and expose a serious challenge to Lord Clive and the expanding East India Company which had, by then, seized control of large parts of India. Lord Clive assigns his right-hand to counter the rising threat posed by the Thugs.

Firangi goes to meet Suraiyya, a dancer and performer and flirts with her. Suraiyya challenges Firangi to confess his feelings during her performance in front of the British officers. Firangi then turns up during her performance, disguised as a Viceroy but Suraiyya removes his prosthetics in the middle of her performance, revealing his disguise. Firangi is arrested and tasked by the East India Company to meet Lord Clive's challenge. He, with the help of his friend, manages to track Azaad at one of Azaad's attack on a British ship. He mistakenly saves Zafira's life by taking a bullet for her and Azaad takes him to their secret location for treatment. He appears before Azaad and asks him for recruiting him. Azaad accepts and begins to show confidence in him.

When Azaad and his men make a stop to pick up muskets from a local ruler who supports their cause, Firangi betrays them and lets the East India Company know about their location. When the forces of the East India Company surround the warehouse where they are meeting with the ruler, Azaad lets Firangi know that he knows Firangi has sold him out but he still believes that Firangi has some good in him. After a short duel, Azaad is about to fall to his death when Firangi saves him. Azaad sees that Firangi is conflicted with his feelings about working for the East India Company and asks him to help with his cause. Azaad then asks him to protect Zafira and then sacrifices himself by confronting the East India Company forces alone so that Zafira and Firangi can escape.

Firangi then goes to Clive for claiming reward and also trades the location of Azaad's remaining thugs. However, this is a trap as Zafira and Firangi attack the incoming ships. Clive, with the help of a prisoner, Bhure Lal attacks them. The thugs survive and then Firangi and Zafira go to Suraiyya who is going to perform on the Dussehra function and asks for her help where Clive will also come so they can kill him there. Initially hesitant to help them, Suraiyya is convinced upon Zafira's request, revealing that there is a revolution in her, too. There before the function, Clive reveals that Azaad is alive and has to be executed. Firangi betrays all the thugs to Clive. However, this is a plan to release all the prisoner thugs including Azaad who survived but was captured by East India Company soldiers.

At the final encounter with the East India Company at an abandoned fort, Zafira fights the EIC soldiers while Firangi stops Clive from boarding his ship. Zafira kills Clive, and justice is served. Azaad looks to the sky and realizes the infertile land has now borne fruit, suggesting that Firangi has now become an empathetic human capable of greatness. The next day, Zafira is crowned the queen and declares her kingdom free of EIC rule. Meanwhile, Firangi along with Suraiyya and Shanichar are shown to have run away with a ship stolen from Zafira to England.

== Cast ==
- Amitabh Bachchan as Khudabaksh Jhaazi (Azaad), a general of the nawab of Raunakpur Mirza Sikander Baig, commander of the Thugs, Zafira's adoptive father.
- Aamir Khan as Firangi Mallah, a small-time Thug from Awadh. Zafira's love interest.
- Katrina Kaif as Suraiyya, a dancer, performer and Firangi's love interest in an extended cameo appearance.
- Fatima Sana Shaikh as Princess Zafira Baig, the daughter of Nawab Mirza Sikander Baig, adopted daughter of Khudabaksh Jhaazi, a warrior-archer Thug, love interest of Firangi Mallah and later Queen of Raunakpur.
- Mohammed Zeeshan Ayyub as Shanichar, Firangi's friend
- Ronit Roy as Mirza Sikander Baig, Nawab of Raunakpur.
- Lloyd Owen as John Clive, a ruthless East India Company officer
- Dev Dave as Young Orderly
- Sharat Saxena as Maharaja Sangram Singh, King of Durgapur.
- Ila Arun as Jaitumbi
- Gavin Marshall as Capt James Powell
- Vikas Shrivastav as Daroga
- Kalida Jan as Ammi, former Queen of Raunakpur, Zafira's mother.
- Deshna Dugad as young Zafira Baig
- Sharad Joshi as Aslam Baig, son of Mirza Sikander Baig, former Prince of Raunakpur, Zafira's brother.
- Shaji Chaudhary as thug Bhure Lal
- Kaivalya Chheda as groom Lala ji
- Abdul Quadir Amin as Azhar Ali

== Production ==
=== Development ===
In September 2016, Yash Raj Films' next project titled Thugs of Hindostan was announced, and would feature Aamir Khan and Amitabh Bachchan. The lead actress was not yet finalised at the time. The film was initially titled only Thug; it was set for a release on Diwali in 2018. Hrithik Roshan, who was initially approached with the film's leading role, suggested some changes to the script. The film producer Aditya Chopra agreed; meanwhile, Acharya approached Khan with the script, who agreed to do the film with no changes to the storyline. Later, in November 2016, Khan also requested that the script be reworked, particularly the character of the leading actress, and put the project on hold. Meanwhile, he grew his hair and beard for his look in the film.

By February 2017, Khan had prepared his look for the film. In the same month, Shraddha Kapoor gave a costume look test and audition for the film. In March 2017, it was reported that Khan suggested Fatima Sana Shaikh's name for a role in the film; while denying rumours of casting, Shaikh expressed her eagerness to work in the project. In May 2017, Shaikh was confirmed to play a role in the film, with her audition look being revealed. She replaced Kapoor. Kaif was confirmed to star in the film on Yash Raj Films' official website. Khan, Bachchan and Acharya met during the month of May to discuss script changes. Contrary to initial reports, the film is not based on Philip Meadows Taylor's 1839 novel Confessions of a Thug (which was about Indian thugs); the film tells a fictional story based on historical events. Acharya links the misunderstanding to the word thug appearing in both works. Khan also denied rumours of Thugs of Hindostan being inspired by Pirates of the Caribbean, stating in May 2017 that they are both simply action-adventure productions, among many others in the action-adventure film genre, such as the Indiana Jones series.

Thugs of Hindostan is Khan's second time collaborating with Vijay Krishna Acharya and Katrina Kaif, after Dhoom 3 (2013). It also marked the first collaboration between Khan and Bachchan. Bachchan and Khan were supposed to star together in the Indra Kumar-directorial Rishta, planned during the late 1990s, but the project was shelved. Besides Roshan, Jackie Shroff, Alia Bhatt, and Deepika Padukone were to be a part of the film, but turned down the role. For his look, Khan also underwent permanent ear and nose piercing.

In making Thugs of Hindostan, Acharya wanted to give a twist to period drama films and thus made what he considered "an irreverent film which has a chapter that is not very noble". He made the film a visual "spectacle", considering the difficulty in bringing audiences to theatres. Khan said his character was someone "who cannot be trusted at all – [so it's the] very opposite of Dangal ... He's a very slippery character. He has no scruples at all – for money he can sell his mother out. He's like that." Kaif said that she does not have much action to do in the film, compared to her previous action roles, in particular Tiger Zinda Hai (2017). Bachchan wore iron armour for playing his character, the second time he did so after his 1988 film Shahenshah. In addition, he also wore a pagri, grew long hair and learned sword-fighting. Most of Bachchan's action sequences were situated in rainy settings.

=== Principal photography ===
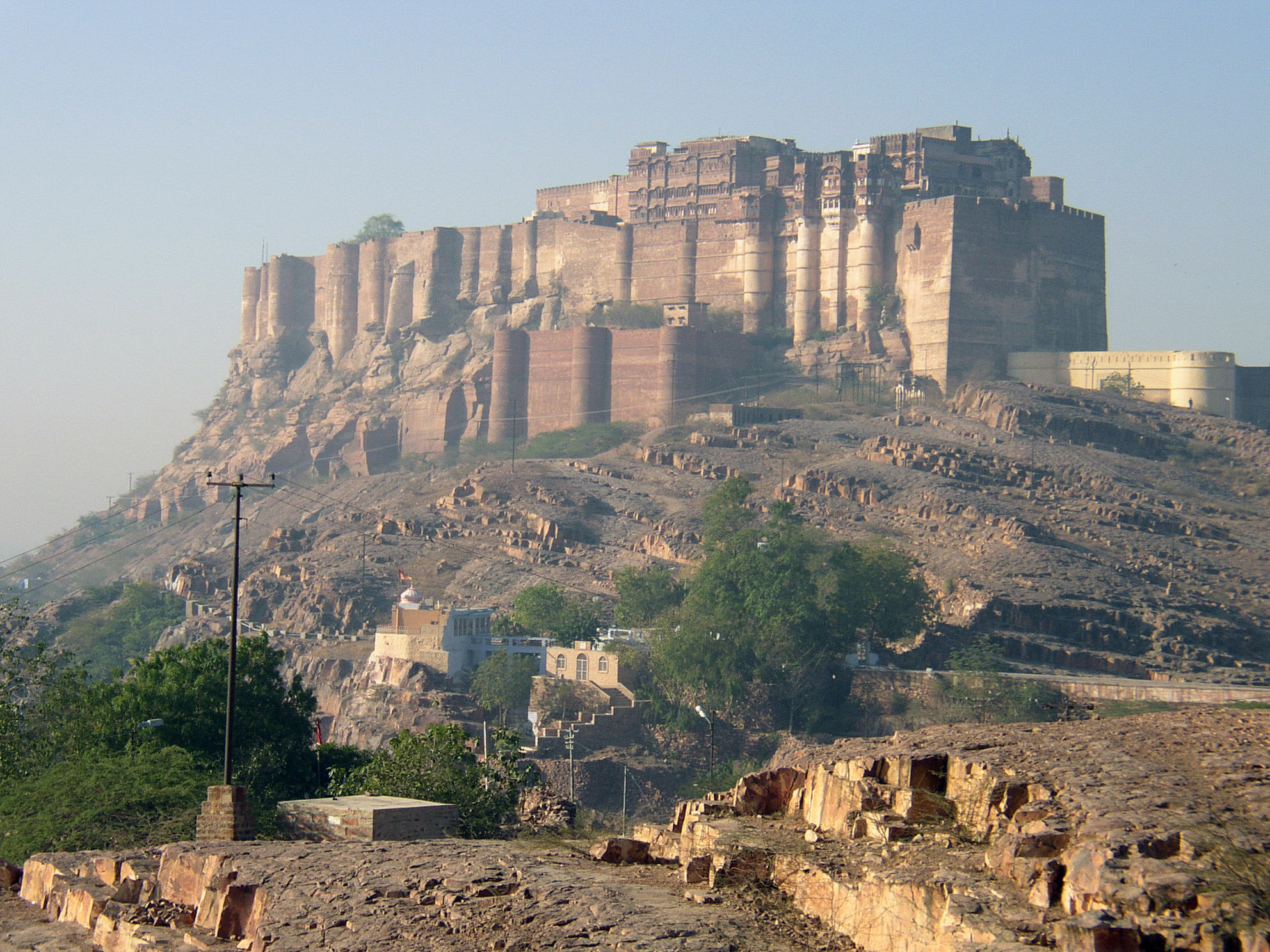
Mehrangarh Fort, situated in Rajasthan, where many sequences were filmed

Thugs of Hindostan's estimated production budget is ₹3 billion (US$43.87 million), making it the most expensive Bollywood film. It was initially planned to be produced on a budget of ₹900 million, but the budget was overrun while filming. Filming commenced on 5 June 2017 in Malta. Two ships were constructed in Malta for the purpose of filming; shooting was heavily guarded to prevent leaks from sets. The ships were built by over 1000 people working together and weighed 200,000 kg each. By 28 June 2017, Bachchan finished filming his first schedule in Malta. In middle July, Khan took a break from filming and went on a vacation to Italy.

Chopra, who was not impressed with the film's action sequences filmed in Malta, had them filmed again in Yash Raj Films' studio. It was reported that busy with filming for Thugs of Hindostan, Khan would be unable to promote his film Secret Superstar (2017) properly. However, in October 2017, Khan took a break from filming to promote his film. In August 2017, Bachchan fractured his rib cage while shooting, but had to continue filming since the schedule was tight. The film's dance sequence, which featured Bachchan, among others, and choreographed by Prabhu Deva was filmed in October 2017. When filming was not taking place, the cast, along with the crew, wore face masks to avoid contracting the common cold. In September 2017, photographers of the Filmfare magazine captured Khan while filming, and leaked his look. An upset Khan increased security surveillance on film sets. The same month, Bachchan's look was also leaked online. Khan stated that "this shouldn't have happened" and it foiled plans for later looking releases.

Filming also took place in Thailand, from 6 December 2017. The schedule was wrapped up on 26 December 2017. Some sequences were also shot in Mehrangarh Fort, Jodhpur. After Bachchan experienced discomfort on set, a team of doctors visited him in Jodhpur. His wife, Jaya Bachchan stated that his heavy costumes hurt his back and neck. The stunts aggravated his pre-existing neck and shoulder pain, which was a result of past injuries from stunts he did for filming in the 1970-80s. Bachchan stated that he was back to normal. The film's shooting was put on a short hiatus as a result of his injury. He resumed filming on 13 March 2018. The film's climax sequence was filmed in Jodhpur, Rajasthan, in late March 2018.

=== China edition ===
A special edition of the film released in China on 28 December 2018, edited by Aamir Khan. It had been heavily re-worked, with significant changes compared to the Indian version. The Chinese edition released with a 120-minute run time, which is 44 minutes shorter than the Indian version's 164-minute run time. Khan reportedly added, removed and re-ordered a number of scenes, made frame-by-frame edits to various scenes, and re-adjusted the narrative structure with a more compact, straightforward plot.

In contrast to the Indian version giving balanced screen time to the three main characters (played by Khan, Bachchan and Sheikh), the China edition instead focuses mainly on Khan's character, with the roles of Bachchan and Sheikh being cut short while Khan's role is extended with deleted scenes that didn't make it into the Indian version. These changes are partly in response to Chinese audience expectations, to capitalise on Khan's popularity in China, and to reduce elements from the film that were not well received in India. The China edition cut a number of slow-motion scenes, but still kept most of the song-and-dance sequences to maintain a festive atmosphere for Christmas.

== Music ==
The film score was composed by John Stewart Eduri, while the original songs featured in the film were composed by Ajay–Atul, with lyrics by Amitabh Bhattacharya. Shankar–Ehsaan–Loy were originally supposed to compose the soundtrack, but were unable to complete their work before the new deadline after the film was reshot, and new tracks were demanded.

== Release ==
Thugs of Hindostan was released in Hindi, Tamil and Telugu with 3D, 4DX and IMAX formats. According to trade analyst Taran Adarsh, the film was initially released in 7000 screens worldwide, including 5,000 in India and 2,000 overseas, the widest for any Hindi film. Thugs of Hindostan released on the same Diwali week with Vijay's film Sarkar.

In Pakistan, the film was released without any cuts, on 120 screens, which is the biggest number of screens for any release in the country. The film was distributed by IMGC, while Geo Films served as a media partner.

=== Marketing ===
In November 2018, the official Hindi trailer crossed 100 million views on YouTube. It became the first Indian trailer to cross 100 million views on the site, and was the YouTube's most-watched Indian trailer of all time, up until it was surpassed by Zero's trailer.

=== China ===
In April 2018, the producers announced plans to release the film in China, where Khan's previous films were successful, including 3 Idiots (2009), PK (2014), Dangal (2016) and Secret Superstar (2017). Chinese distributors decided not to release the film in China on the same day as India. The Chinese censorship process takes about two months, after which Khan plans to release the film there in January 2019. Chinese distribution company E Star Films initially agreed to acquire the theatrical rights, with a minimum guarantee of $20 million (₹145 crore) from China. After the film's Indian release, however, it was later changed to a revenue-sharing deal between E Star Films and Yash Raj Films. The film is released in China on 28 December 2018, with a Chinese title that roughly translates as "Indian Thugs".

For the film's promotion, Aamir Khan toured China for ten days, starting from 16 December 2018. He toured eight major cities, including Sanya, Guangzhou, Xi'an, Nanjing, Chengdu, Wuhan, Shanghai, and Beijing. He was invited to the first Hainan International Film Festival, where he shared the stage with Hong Kong action film star Jackie Chan, Turkish film director Nuri Bilge Ceylan, and Hollywood film stars including Johnny Depp and Mads Mikkelsen. Khan also presented the festival's top prize for Dying to Survive. The film's Chinese premiere was held at the Beijing Film Academy on 24 December 2018.

== Box office ==
Worldwide, the film grossed between ₹202.38 crore ($20.95 million) and ₹211.98 crore ($22 million) in its opening weekend, and it grossed ₹238.4 crore ($25 million) in its opening week. By 26 November 2018, the film had grossed ₹262.8 crore ($27.21 million) worldwide. As of 31 December 2018, Thugs of Hindostan has grossed ₹320 crore ($33 million) at the worldwide box office.

Market(s)	Gross revenue
India	₹151.19 crore ($16 million)
Overseas	$19 million (₹134.21 crore)
China	CN¥62 million – $9.61 million (₹65 crore)
Other territories	$9.5 million (₹69 crore)
Worldwide	₹335 crore ($35 million)

=== India ===
Thugs of Hindostan had the biggest morning occupancy for an Indian film in 2018, with 65-70% of the seats booked. Its first day collection in India was the highest for any Hindi film, at ₹52.25 crore nett (₹63.5 crore gross), surpassing the previous opening day records held by Happy New Year (₹44.97 crore), Baahubali 2 (₹41 crore), and Prem Ratan Dhan Payo (₹40.35 crore). On the second day, the film's nett collection dropped to ₹29.25 crore. Its two-day total was an estimated ₹81.50 crore nett in India, the highest for any Hindi film in its first two days. In three days, the film's domestic collection was ₹105 crore nett, becoming Amitabh Bachchan's first film to net ₹100 crore in India (without taking inflation into account). By the end of its opening weekend on 11 November 2018, the film's domestic collections were ₹123 crore nett and ₹157.69 crore gross. It surpassed Dhoom 3 to become Aamir Khan's biggest opening weekend in India, and surpassed Sanju to become the highest opening weekend grosser of 2018. Thugs of Hindostan also became India's fourth highest opening weekend grosser of all time, after Sultan, Prem Ratan Dhan Payo and Baahubali 2. In its opening week, the film's collections in India were ₹140.4 crore nett, and ₹180 crore gross, becoming the fourth highest opening week grosser of 2018, after Sanju, Padmaavat and Race 3.

The box-office takings, however, dropped significantly after receiving bad reviews, and the film made only ₹145 crore in India after 11 days. It resulted in significant losses for theatre owners, who demanded refunds from the sub-distributor of Yash Raj Films. As of 26 November 2018, the film's collections in India stand at ₹151.19 crore nett and ₹193.83 crore gross.

=== Overseas ===
Overseas, the film grossed US$6.4 million (₹46.66 crore) in its opening weekend, including US$2.22 million in the Arab states of the Persian Gulf, US$1.45 million in the United States and Canada, and £497,663 ($681,730) in the United Kingdom. It had the year's third highest-grossing opening weekend overseas, after Padmaavat and Sanju. In its opening week, the film grossed US$7.8 million (₹56.8 crore) overseas. As of 26 November 2018, the film grossed $9.5 million (₹69.18 crore) overseas.

In China, where it released on 28 December 2018 at 19:00 China time, the film grossed $1.78 million (₹17 crore) within the last five hours of opening day, entering the daily box office chart at number three (behind Chinese film Kill Mobile and Hollywood film Aquaman), but with the second highest per-screen average (behind Kill Mobile). In China, the film grossed $4.78 million in its opening weekend, and $8.21 million in its opening week.

== Reception ==
=== India ===
Thugs of Hindostan received generally negative reviews from critics. While the performances of Bachchan and Khan drew praise, both Acharya's direction and screenplay were criticised.

Rachit Gupta of The Times of India gave the film two and a half stars out of five and shares the sentiments of most reviewers: "[It] looks like a million bucks, [but] it doesn't feel the same way". He praised the production design and cinematography, but criticised the lack of suspense and "the predictable nature of the writing... [which] doesn't help the movie at all". The visual effects were commended, but the pace and running time was criticised. Saibal Chatterjee of NDTV rated the film two and a half stars out of five and called it "big, bloated, [and] bombastic", asserting that it "banks solely upon action and spectacle for impact". He criticised the screenplay and budget's inability to raise the film. He found that Shaikh played some sequences well, while women were overall less represented. He felt it was "ultimately too tacky and unconvincing to lay legitimate claims to being India's answer to Pirates of the Caribbean". Nandini Ramath of Scroll.in labelled Thugs of Hindostan a "trite, uninvolving" film. She felt sequences filmed in the sea were "sluggishly directed", and "the ones on land fare no better". The action scenes were tagged "flat and uninvolving" and the background score as "insistently ponderous."

In a positive review, Rohini Nair of Firstpost appreciated the use of metaphorical allegories in the film and praised Bachchan and Khan's chemistry. She wrote of Kaif: "She writhes and contorts in sequinned hotpants as the plot builds towards its climax". Nair wrote that "all is forgiven in the rip-roaring, all muskets blazing finale sequence of the film". She raises expectations for a sequel. Gupta praised the performances of both Bachchan and Khan; Khan for his "comedy and banter" and Bachchan for his "heroics and the intense dialogues". The ensemble cast, was, however, condemned. Chatterjee commended Khan and Bachchan for bringing "everything that they have", in his review. Commenting on the uneven distribution of screen time, Ramath stated Bachchan "lumbers through the movie and looks exhausted". Khan's chemistry was praised, and the scenes were stated to "came to life" with him with his dialogues.

Harish Wankhede's another positive review in the Indian Express provides a subaltern perspective to the film. He argues that "Thugs of Hindostan thus brings the peripheral, the lumpen proletariat and other degraded groups centre-stage in building the foundations of the new nation. It gives the film a subaltern-satirical Dalit perspective."

Rajeev Masand of CNN-IBN gave 2 stars out of 5, commenting "Not every film needs to be uplifting, inspiring, or even fun. But watching a movie shouldn’t feel like you’re serving a jail term either."

Taran Adarsh, film analyst for Bollywood Hungama, opined the film was "[a] King-sized [d]isappointment." He felt several good moments in the first half of the film, were hindered by the "formula-ridden plot, screenplay of convenience, and shoddy direction". Writing for the Hindustan Times, Raja Sen remarked that the film is “Pirates Of The Caribbean without pirates or Caribbean”. Shubra Gupta of The Indian Express termed the "a massive cherry-picking enterprise from big entertainers of the past, many of them YRF's own", and referred to it as "a boring affair". She criticised the screenplay and the plot, and noted that the characters' interactions with each other felt heavy-handed". Gupta, however, praised Khan: "[W]hile he's around, it's bearable. Just about". Ankur Pathak of Huffington Post India stated that the film "was so awful that it felt like a satire of itself". He termed the film "a vanity project that tries to cash in on the profitable wave triggered by the Baahubali movies". Rahul Desai of Film Companion sums up the retort: "[It is] the Bollywood manifestation of Halloween – an amusing, self-gratifying but altogether pointless fancy-dress ball designed to trick audiences under the guise of treating them".

=== Overseas ===
Among overseas critics, Joe Leydon of Variety gave it a generally positive review, stating the "expensive and exuberant Bollywood masala delivers the goods as a satisfying popcorn epic." Mike McCahill of The Guardian rated the film three out of five stars, referring to it as an enjoyable irreverent romp. Global Times notes that the film has received a mixed reception in China, but that its Chinese reception is generally better than its Indian reception.

== Home media ==
The film has recovered approximately ₹170 crore ($17.6 million) from satellite, digital and music rights. This includes about ₹140 crore for satellite and digital rights, with satellite rights sold to Sony Pictures Networks India and digital rights sold to Amazon Prime Video.

== See also ==
- Thuggee
- Confessions of a Thug
- List of Asian historical drama films
