= Feringheea =

Indian criminal and informant (1800–1855)

- Born: c. 1800; Murnae, Gwalior State
- Died: Late 1855 (aged 54–55); Jubbulpore, Jubbulpore Division, Company Raj
- Years active: 1813 – c. 1817, 1821–1830
- Known for: Turning King's evidence
- Title: Jemadar
- Conviction: Thuggee (conditionally pardoned)
- Penalty: Life imprisonment

Details
- Victims: Confessed to 233 murders over 1827–1830 by various gangs under his leadership
- Span of crimes: 1813–1830
- Location: Indian subcontinent
- Target: Travellers
- Date apprehended: November 1830
- Imprisoned at: Central Jail, Jubbulpore; Jubbulpore School of Industry from 1837

Feringheea, also Feringeea, was a thuggee gang leader who was captured in 1830 and subsequently became a valuable approver (the period term for informant) during the British Anti-Thuggee Campaign of the 1830s.

Feringheea became famous after he was featured as the fictional chief of the Thugs in the 1844–1845 serial novel Le Juif errant, and later appeared as the main character in the 1877 novel Le Procès des Thugs. Popular history works in the 20th century presented Feringheea as a "master criminal" and his capture as the highlight of William Henry Sleeman's career.

== Early life ==
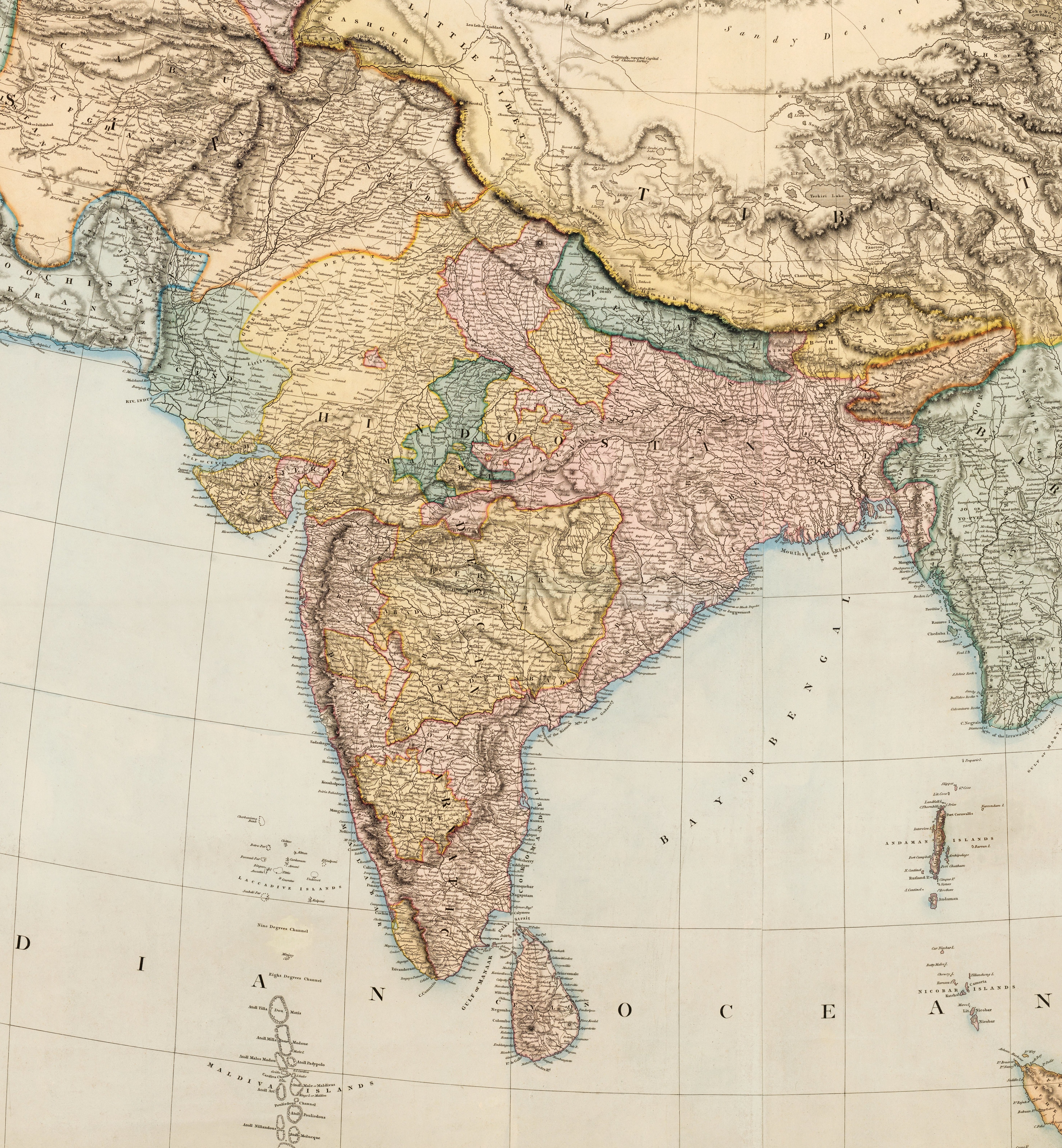
Map of India under Company rule and the Maratha Confederacy in 1827, with the Gwalior State in green

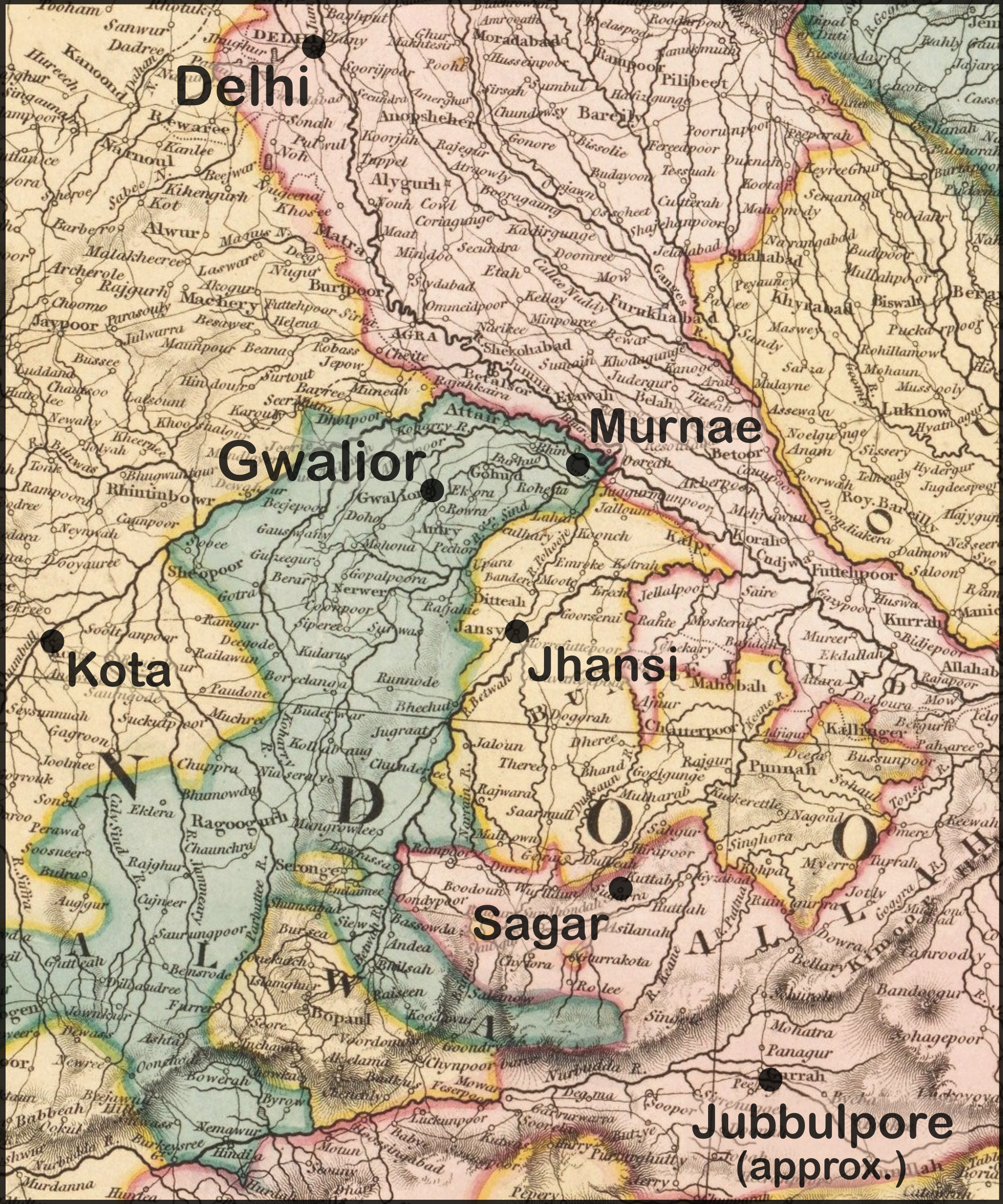
Enlarged view of Northern and Central India

Feringheea was born into a Brahmin family in the village of Murnae, part of the Scindia-ruled Gwalior State. His grandfather and uncle are present in a 1797 tax list of thugs prepared for Maharaja Daulat Rao Scindia, with his grandfather listed as the father of five heads of families. Feringheea himself later claimed be a seventh-generation thug.

The oral history of his birth held that he had been born during his family's flight from Murnae after General Pierre Perron sent a regiment to force his uncle to pay back a debt to the state of Rs 18,000. He was therein purportedly named Feringheea after those leading the attack, feringhee meaning 'foreigners' or 'Europeans'. Another version held that the village was attacked by Colonel Benoît de Boigne because the local zamindars were rebelling against Scindia rule. Kim A. Wagner finds it plausible that the village was attacked as part of a campaign commanded by Perron against a rebellion based in the fortress of Seondha, as sources also mention a Captain Bellasis who may have been the 'Captain Bulust' mentioned in one account. Feringheea's family lived in Murnae until 1812, when it was razed in retribution for the killing of a British officer during an expedition to introduce British law into the area.

Feringheea joined a band of 150 men for his first thuggee expedition to Kota in 1813, where he may have aided in deceiving his first victim. He was present at the killing of a party of treasure bearers near the village of Sujaina in 1814, which netted the 40 thugs Rs 4,500. Feringheea thereafter abandoned thuggee and sought service in the army of the East India Company. (Note: He claimed that this was because of a falling out with his cousin, but Mike Dash surmises that it may have been because the roads had become more dangerous as a byproduct of the 1817–1819 Third Anglo-Maratha War.) By 1821 he had risen to chief of the messenger service under British Resident at Delhi David Ochterlony, though fled after his friend was caught with one of Ochterlony's maidservants. Feringheea resumed his thuggee career, working with the gangs of Rajputana and Telangana as a jemadar (gang leader). In 1822, a gang under Feringheea was caught and had their faces blackened. In the cold season of 1828–1829, Feringheea and his gang strangled 77 men and three women and he spent four months of 1829 imprisoned in Alumpore before escaping.

== Capture and collaboration ==
In December 1829, Feringheea's gang of 40 thugs was ambushed and the majority of them captured by Company sepoys while he was in a village obtaining supplies, with only 12 managing to escape. Seven of the captured thugs agreed to become approvers and, by January 1830, they had informed the British of Feringheea's identity, aliases, appearance, habits, and the location of his home in the village of Gorha, near Jhansi. A patrol of nujeebs (militiamen used by the Thuggee Department as pseudo-police detectives under William Henry Sleeman) attempted a midnight raid on Feringheea's cottage, however he managed to escape out the back. The nujeebs instead arrested the remaining occupants of the house, including his mother, wife, and child.

Feringheea returned to Gorha a few weeks later and formed a smaller gang, setting off in June or July. He was arrested near the Narmada River by the militia of a local rajah, upon which his gang abandoned him, but was able to secure his release after two days and joined another band of thugs near Sagar. The gang was shortly arrested by the local daroga on suspicion of robbery, though Feringheea was again able to secure his release and retired to Bundelkhand.

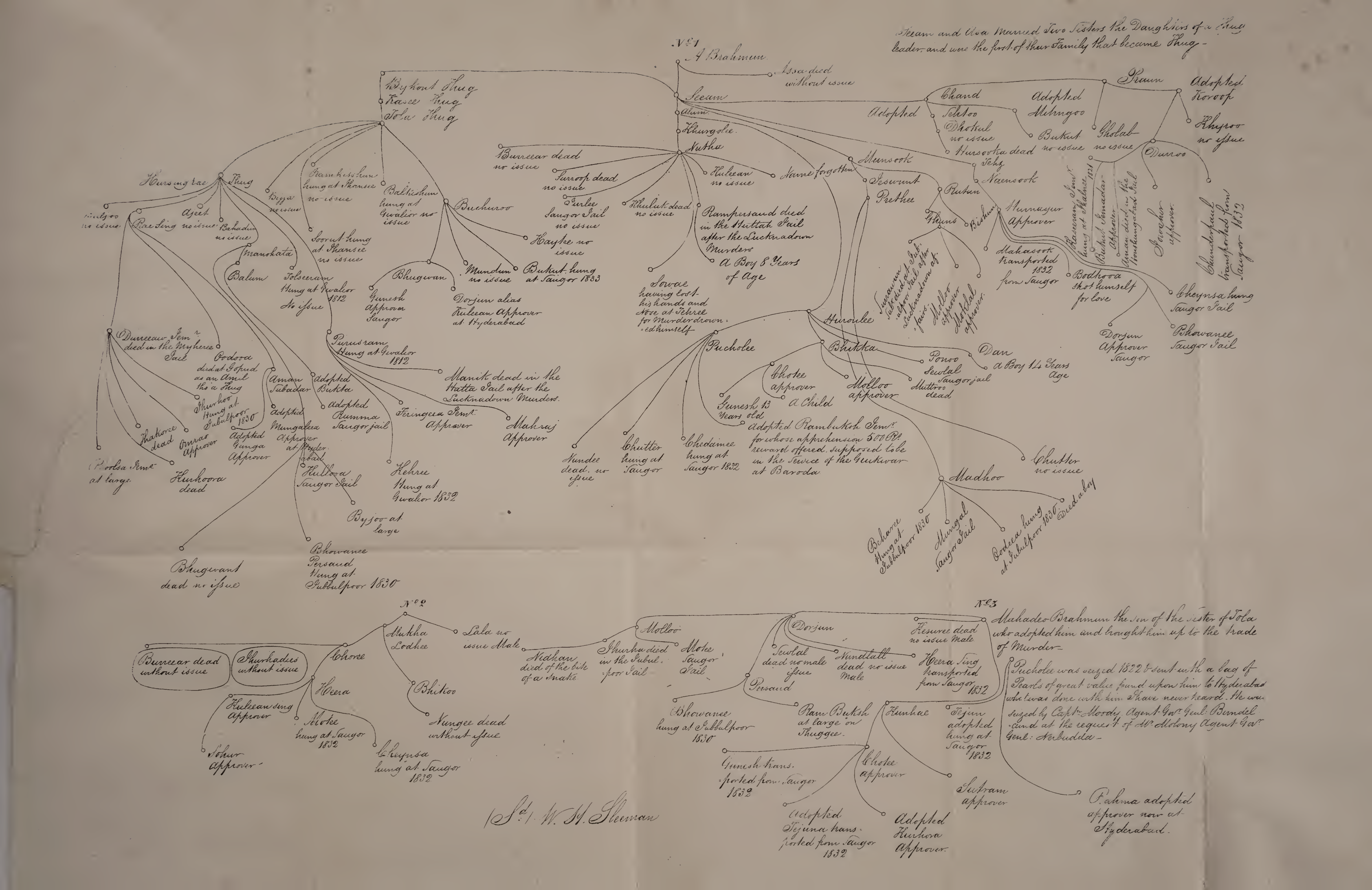
Genealogical tree made by Sleeman of Feringheea's (centre-left) family, published in his 1836 book Ramaseeana.

By this point there was a Rs 500 reward on Feringheea and a group of Sleeman's nujeebs, escorted by approvers, tracked him down and arrested him in the village of Kisrae in November, taking him to Jhansi jail. Upon receiving news of his capture, Sleeman travelled to Sagar to escort Feringheea back to Jubbulpore in person, which they reached in early December. Feringheea convinced Sleeman of his usefulness and was subsequently accepted as an approver.

To prove his reliability in January 1831, he provided the location for where 25 men had been buried over the past ten years in a spot outside the village of Salohda. Feringheea's capture became a publicity coup and his testimony was used by Sleeman and his superior F. C. Smith in February to argue for more resources. Feringheea became Sleeman's favourite approver and assisted investigations. He was the most influential out of the roughly 100 thuggee approvers and his depositions feature more often in the Company's records than any other. After the arrest of 289 thugs following a sweep through the villages surrounding Jhansi, Feringheea identified 283 of them and provided details on most of their careers. Feringheea was returned to jail in 1832 and died in late 1855.

== In fiction ==
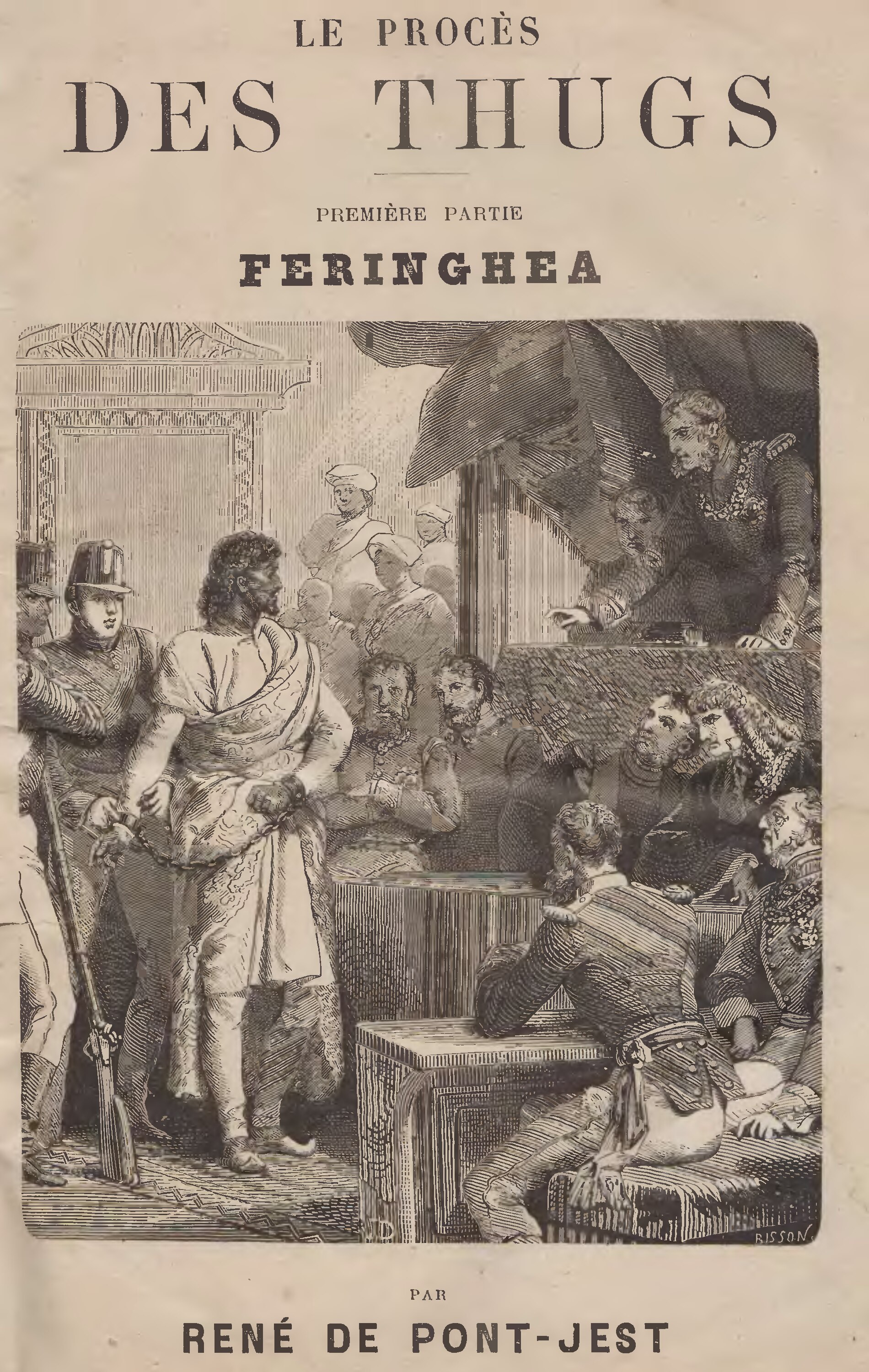
Cover of the first serial in Le Procès des Thugs, depicting the Feringheea character (centre-left)

In the 1844–1845 serial Le Juif errant (The Wandering Jew) by Eugène Sue, Feringheea (spelled Feringhea in the novel) appears as the chief of the Thugs, who are presented as products of the tyranny of Indian society and the exploitation of colonisers. Feringheea escapes India with three Thugs, planning to continue their activities in Java and all countries of oppression, misery, corruption, and slavery.

In the 1877 novel Le Procès des Thugs (The Trial of Thugs) by René de Pont-Jest [fr], Feringheea's name is given to the hero of the book, heavily inspired by Confessions of a Thug, and leader of the Thugs. The book centres around a spectacular trial in Madras focused on the Thugs' depravities, but which reveals the Thugs to be patriots against their British oppressors, later allying with the Fenians. The character of Feringheea testifies that he had been born in a marble palace with servants but had been kidnapped at a young age.

== In popular history ==
In popular history works on the Anti-Thuggee Campaign, Feringheea's capture was exaggerated as the highlight of Sleeman's career. James L. Sleeman (W. H. Sleeman's grandson) describes Feringheea in his 1933 book Thug: or, A Million Murders as the "keystone which, once removed, caused the arch of Thuggee to totter until, stone by stone, it fell and the hideous faith it spanned ceased to exist". In his 1961 book The Yellow Scarf: The Story of the Life of Thuggee Sleeman, Francis Tuker described Feringheea as the "Prince of Thugs" and "the centre of the whole wickedness", also featuring an imagined conversation where Sleeman interrogates Feringheea in the Thugs' "secret slang" of Ramasee. In his 1968 book The Stranglers: The Cult of Thuggee and its Overthrow in British India, George Bruce presented Feringheea's capture as the climax of Sleeman's detective work.

Historian Máire ní Fhlathúin describes these works as detective stories in which Feringheea is cast as the "master criminal" to Sleeman's "master detective". Kim A. Wagner describes them as "historical fiction" verging on colonial hagiography.

== Bibliography ==
- Dash, Mike (2005). Thug: The True Story of India's Murderous Cult. London: Granta. ISBN 978-1-86207-846-8.
- Fhlathúin, Máire ní (2001). ""That solitary Englishman": W.H. Sleeman and the biography of British India". Victorian Review. 27 (1): 1–13. doi:10.1353/vcr.2001.0003.
- Van Woerkens, Martine (2002). The Strangled Traveler: Colonial Imaginings and the Thugs of India. Chicago, London: University of Chicago Press. ISBN 978-022-685-086-3.
- Wagner, Kim A. (2004). "The Deconstructed Stranglers: A Reassessment of Thuggee". Modern Asian Studies. 38 (4): 931–963. doi:10.1017/S0026749X04001258. JSTOR 3876674.
- Wagner, Kim A. (2007). Thuggee: Banditry and the British in Early Nineteenth-Century India. New York: Palgrave Macmillan. ISBN 978-0-230-59020-5.
