= William Henry Sleeman =

British colonial administrator (1788–1856)

Sir William Henry Sleeman KCB
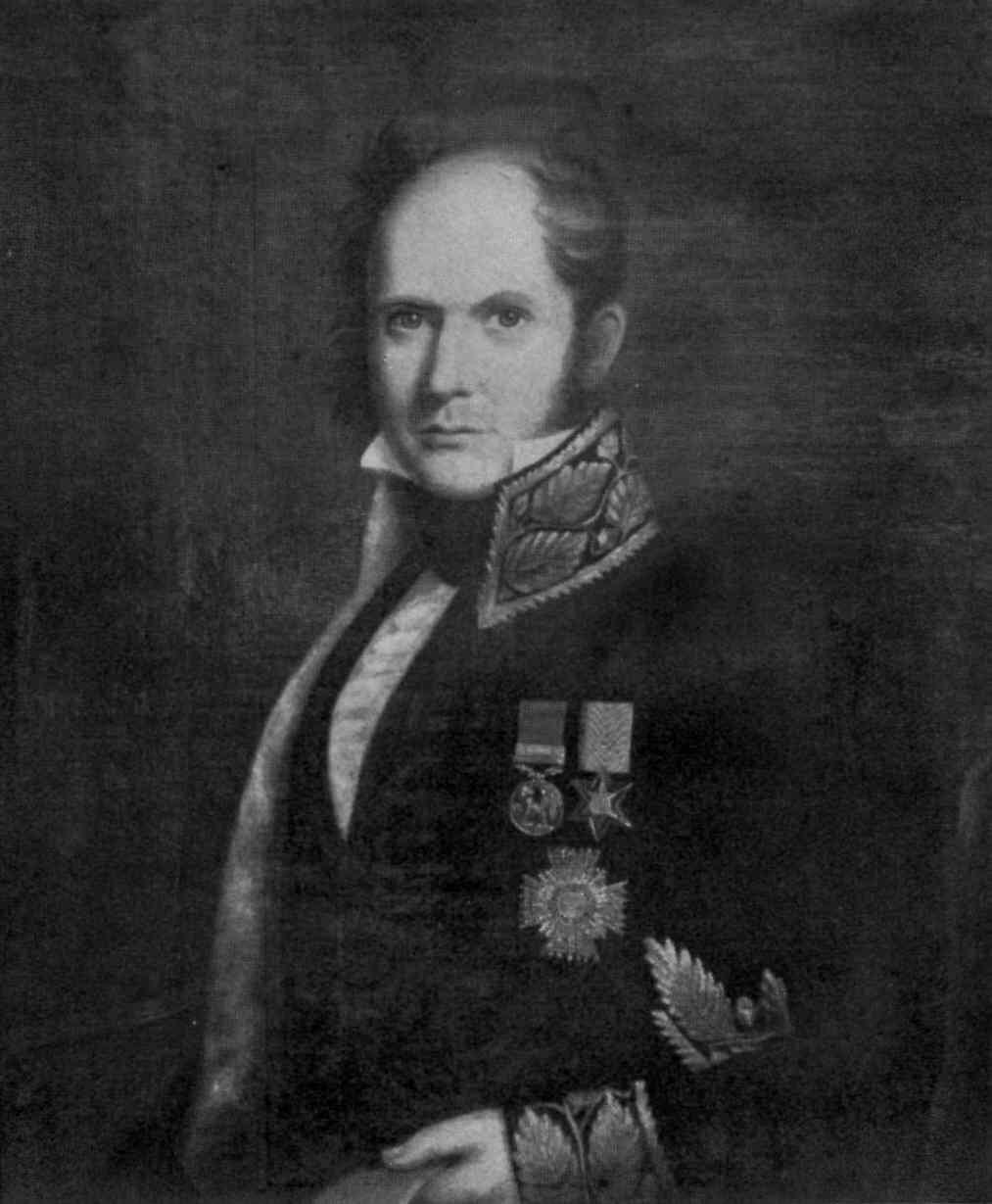

General Superintendent of the Operations for the Suppression of Thuggee (Note: United with the office of Commissioner for the Suppression of Dacoity on 12 February 1839, though dacoity had been added to Sleeman's responsibilities in 1838.)
- In office 5 March 1835 – 1855
- Governors General: Lord William Bentinck; Charles Metcalfe; The Earl of Auckland; The Earl of Ellenborough; William Wilberforce Bird; The Viscount Hardinge; The Marquess of Dalhousie
- Preceded by: Position established
- Succeeded by: James Sleeman

Resident at the Court of Lucknow
- In office 11 January 1849 – November 1854
- Governor General: The Marquess of Dalhousie
- Preceded by: Archibald Fullerton Richmond
- Succeeded by: James Outram

Resident at the Court of Gwalior
- In office 1843–1849
- Governors General: The Earl of Ellenborough; William Wilberforce Bird; The Viscount Hardinge; The Marquess of Dalhousie
- Preceded by: Alexander Spiers

Personal details
- Born: 8 August 1788 Stratton, Cornwall, Great Britain
- Died: 10 February 1856 (aged 67) At sea near Ceylon, 2°22′S 82°51′E
- Spouse: Amélie Josephine de Fontenne (1809/10–1882, m. 1829)
- Relations: James Sleeman (nephew, 1817/18–1899); Sir James Lewis Sleeman (grandson, 1880–1963)
- Children: 7
- Known for: Thuggee suppression

Military service
- Allegiance: British East India Company
- Branch/service: Bengal Army
- Years of service: 1809–1820
- Rank: Major general Lieutenant (active service) (Note: Despite being in civil and political posts, Sleeman retained his right to military promotion in accordance with Company regulations.)
- Unit: 12th Native Infantry Regiment
- Battles/wars: Gorkha War
- Awards: Army of India Medal; Gwalior Star; Nepal Medal

Sir William Henry Sleeman KCB (8 August 1788 – 10 February 1856) was a British officer and administrator in Company-ruled India, best known for his leading role in the Anti-Thuggee Campaign of the 1830s against what he represented as a pan-Indian fraternity of ritual stranglers. Sleeman served as General Superintendent of the Thuggee Department (Note: The Thuggee and Dacoity Department from 1839.) from 1835 to 1855 and published his main work on thuggee, entitled Ramaseeana, in 1836. His writings served as the foundation for the colonial-era representation of thuggee and formed the basis of Philip Meadows Taylor's 1839 novel Confessions of a Thug.

Sleeman joined the Bengal Army of the East India Company in 1809 and served during the Gorkha War from 1814 to 1816. He joined the Company's political service in 1820 as an assistant to the Agent of the Governor-General in the Saugor and Nerbudda Territories, remaining in central India for the Anti-Thuggee Campaign. Sleeman's work saw the extension of policing powers over itinerant communities, which later culminated in the 1871 Criminal Tribes Act.

Between 1843 and 1849, Sleeman served as the British Resident in Gwalior, and from 1849 to 1854 in Lucknow. He toured the Kingdom of Oudh in 1849–1850, and his subsequent report to Governor-General Lord Dalhousie (published in 1858 as A Journey Through the Kingdom of Oude) proved instrumental in justifying its annexation in 1856. Sleeman's health collapsed in 1854 and he died at sea in 1856, en route to London. Sleeman himself strongly argued against the annexation of the native states, cautioning Lord Dalhousie that it could lead the Company's sepoys to mutiny. His correspondence on the matter was published posthumously in The Times in 1857 and together with his 1849–1850 report in 1858.

Sleeman also published works on political economy in which he criticised the Company's high taxes and lack of investment in the local population, viewing the policies as detrimental to British rule. He inadvertently made the first discovery of dinosaur bones on the Indian subcontinent in 1828, proposed in 1877 as Titanosaurus indicus, and his reports on feral children raised by wolves are thought to have inspired the character of Mowgli in Rudyard Kipling's 1894 novel The Jungle Book.

== Early life and education ==
William Henry Sleeman was born on 8 August 1788 in Stratton, into a Cornish gentry family. His parents were Philip Sleeman, who worked at H.M. Excise, and Mary (d. 1818), née Spry. The family moved to Bideford in 1798 for Philip's work but moved back to Cornwall after Sleeman's father died in 1802, leaving the family with financial difficulties.

This prevented Sleeman from becoming an officer in the British Army, which effectively required a sufficient private income, and he instead settled on joining the East India Company. With the help of family connections and the offices of Lord de Dunstanville, Sleeman was accepted into the Bengal Army of the Company as a cadet. In March 1809, he embarked on the Devonshire from Gravesend, arriving in Calcutta in late 1809. (Note: Open and formal exams were yet to be adopted and cadetships at the time were obtained almost exclusively by the English gentry from influence and acquaintances with the directors of the Company.)

== Military career ==
In December, Sleeman began his cadetship in Dinapore and was promoted to the rank of ensign in 1810. He was promoted to lieutenant in December 1814 and served in the Gorkha War from 1814 to 1816. Inbetween the 1814 and 1815 campaigns, the 12th Native Infantry Regiment in which Sleeman served was devastated by an outbreak of malaria. Of the regiment's ten European officers, seven fell ill, with Sleeman among the two that survived. After the war, he was stationed at Allahabad in 1817 and in 1818 at the cantonment of Pratapgarh in the Oudh State. With little prospect of further active service, Sleeman applied to join the Company's political service.

== Civil and political service ==
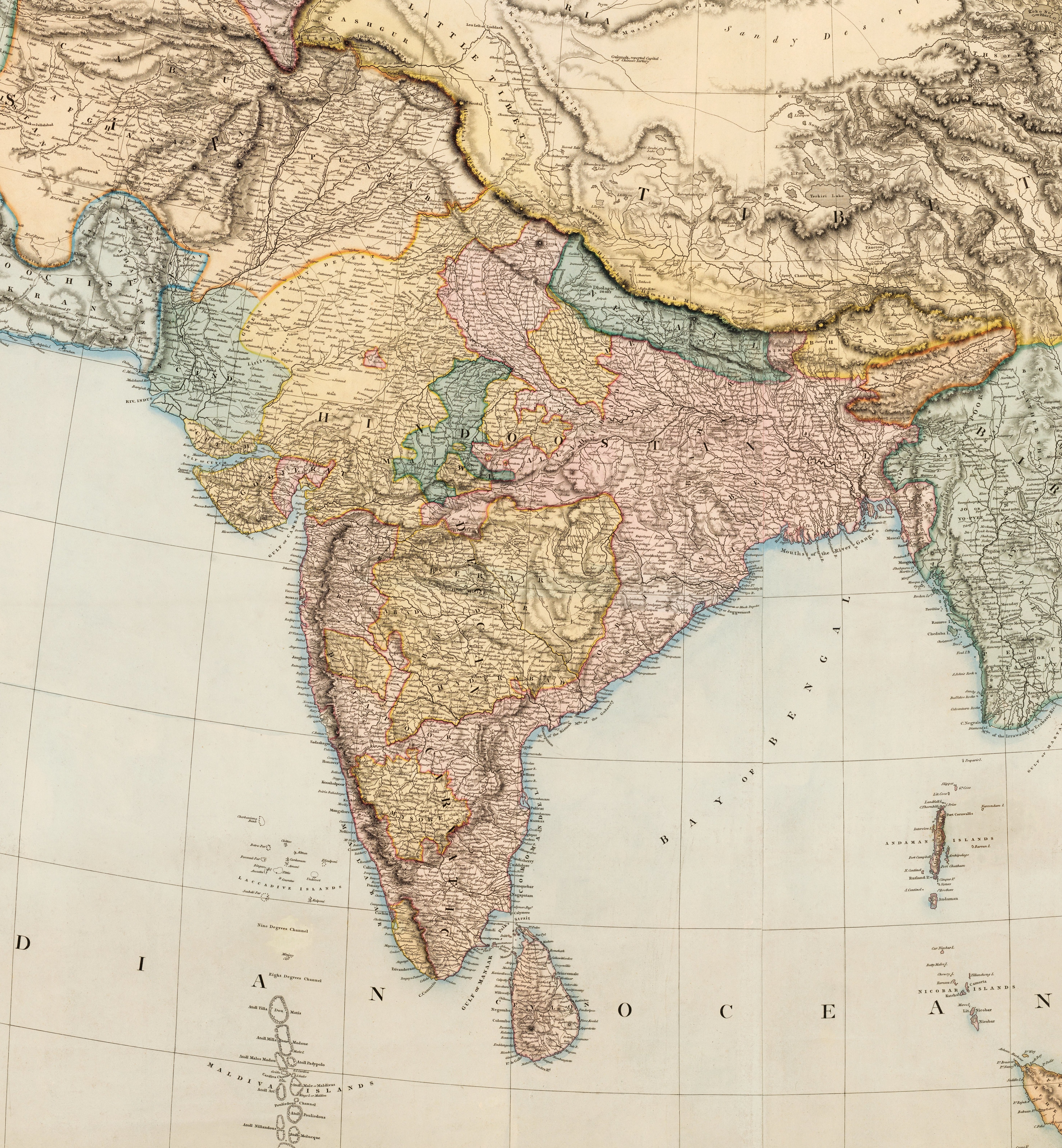
Map of the Indian subcontinent in 1827

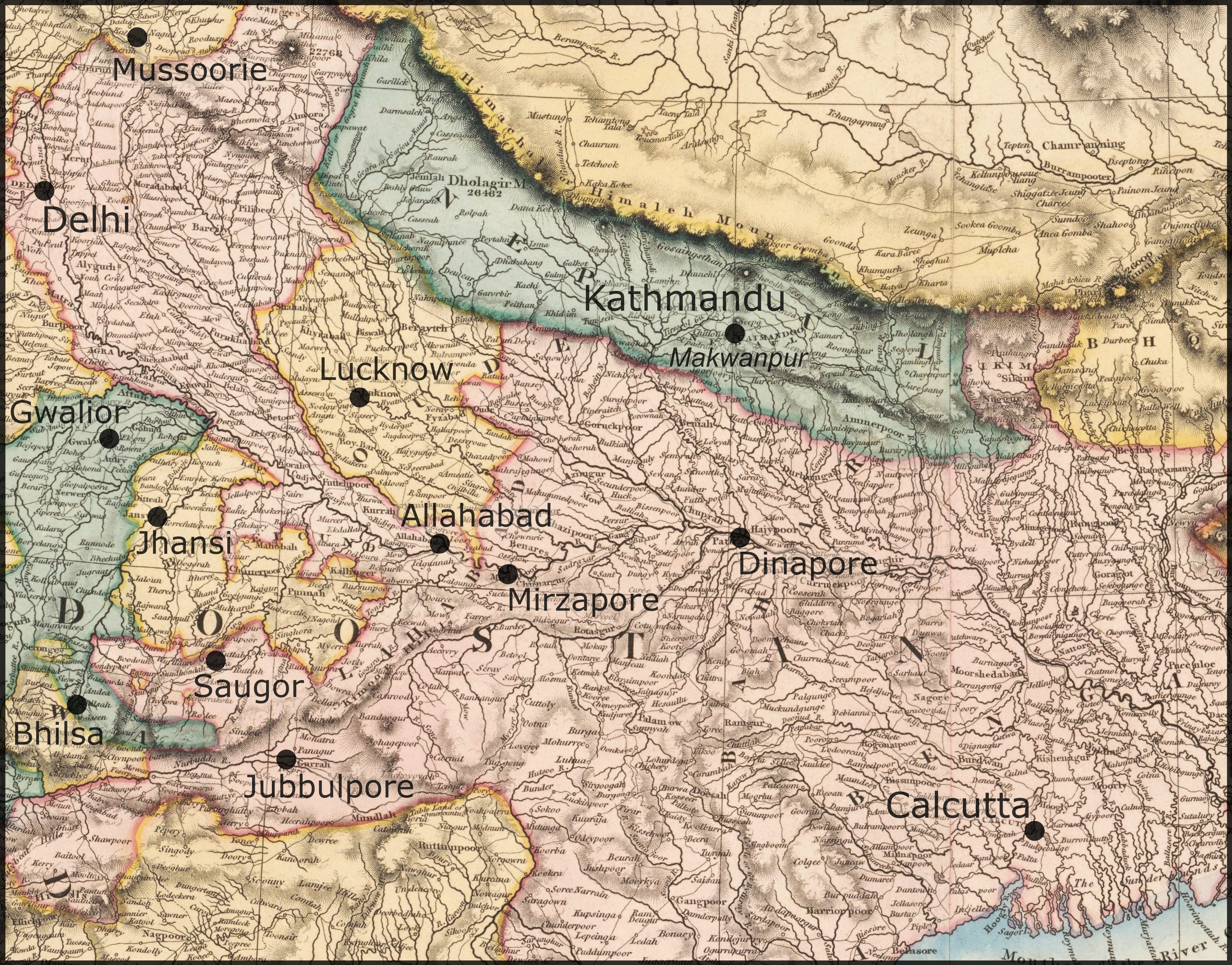
Enlarged view of northern, central, and eastern India

In 1820, Sleeman assumed the position of junior assistant to the Agent of the Governor-General in the Saugor and Nerbudda Territories. In 1822, he was placed in charge of the Narsinghpur District. He was forced to take a period of sick leave in 1826 and was placed in charge of the Jubbulpore district in 1828. On 21 June 1829, Sleeman married Amélie Josephine de Fontenne who was the daughter of Count Blondin de Fontenne, a French nobleman who had escaped the Revolution. In his 1844 book Rambles and Recollections of an Indian Official, Sleeman recounted his involvement with a case of sati in the village of Gopalpur in November 1829, in which a recently bereaved widow convinced him that her wish was to burn with her husband's body.

=== Anti-Thuggee Campaign ===
==== Localised efforts (1829–1830) ====
The British colonial authorities became aware of bands of highway robbers they termed Thugs in 1807–1809, and by 1815 thuggee had been accepted by British officials as specialised and organised crime with the Thugs given a caste-like status. In 1830, Sleeman began assigning approvers (the period term for informants) that he had in captivity to accompany armed patrols along exposed roads, capturing 24 Thugs on two occasions and acquiring more approvers in the process. Though the historian Mike Dash notes that Sleeman had been in India in 1810 when a warning was sent out to the Company's sepoys and was likely to have been aware of a thuggee case in Jubbulpore in 1826, he states that there is no evidence to suggest that Sleeman took a great interest in the matter before 1829. (Note: Sleeman's biographer Francis Tuker claimed that he had possessed a long-term interest in thuggee, whereby he discovered an account by Jean de Thévenot early in his career and an article on thuggee by Dr. Sherwood during his time in Allahabad around 1819. Historian Máire ní Fhlathúin describes the historical accuracy of this version of events as doubtful and holds the evidence to suggest that Sleeman first encountered Sherwood's article, and subsequently Thévenot's account, when it was circulated by the Government in December 1830.) Dash surmises that Sleeman became interested in thuggee in 1829, in the context of Captain Borthwick's success in arresting Thugs and his slow career progression by that point after ten years of service. Sleeman submitted his first report on thuggee in May 1830, writing:

These proceedings are voluminous, but the depredations of these common enemies of mankind, which under the sanction of religious rites, ceremonies and opinions make almost every road in India between the Jumna and the Indus from the beginning of November to the end of May a dreadful scene of hourly murder, are becoming a subject of awful interest, and these proceedings have swelled from my anxiety to collect all the material that would be found to bear upon this particular case... for by discharging certain duties to the priests and temples of their tutelary deity, Bhowanie, they believe that their murders are all perpetrated under her especial sanction and auspices...

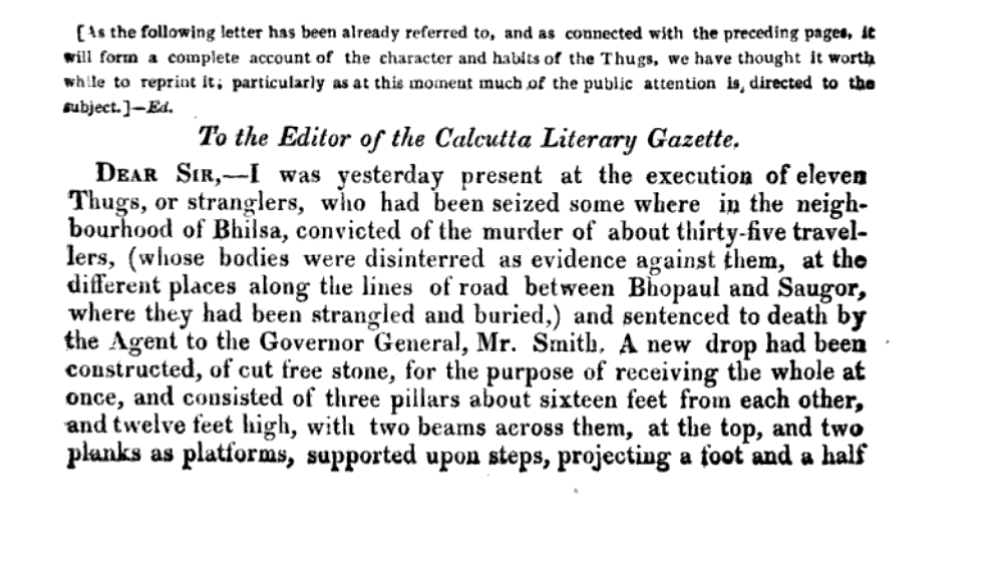
The beginning of the October 1830 letter, reprinted in 1832

Sleeman further asserted that the Thugs could murder freely in Bhilsa and suggested that the district be secured from Scindia rule. Francis Curwen Smith, Sleeman's superior as Agent of the Saugor and Nerbudda Territories, suggested him for the position of Agent at Saugor in September. That year, Sleeman was sent 72 Thugs for trial that had been arrested in 1822 by Commissioner C. A. Molony, but which had been forgotten about after Molony had died. Sleeman argued against capital punishment for the Thugs on the basis that they had already been detained for eight years, during which time 33 of them had died. Smith and the Government disagreed, and 26 were sentenced to be hanged.

On 3 October, Sleeman contributed an anonymous letter to the Calcutta Literary Gazette that recounted the execution of 11 Thugs and asserted that all the Thugs in India congregated at Vindhyachal Temple in Mirzapur, where their expeditions were planned by the temple priests. Sleeman's letter further provided details of ceremonies performed by the Thugs and described Thuggee as:

... an organised system of religious and civil polity, to receive converts from all religions and sects, and to use them to the murder of their fellow creatures under the assurance of high rewards in this world and the next... It is the imperious duty of the Supreme Government of this country to put an end in some way or other to this dreadful system of murder, by which thousands of human beings are now annually sacrificed upon every great road throughout India... You will probably hear from me again on this fearful subject.

==== Centralised campaign (1830–1839) ====
Sleeman's anonymous letter resonated with the Government, prompting Chief Secretary to the Government George Swinton to commission a report from Smith and Sleeman on the feasibility of a wider campaign against thuggee. Swinton appointed Sleeman Agent at Saugor on 13 October and Smith submitted the plan on 19 November, which argued for the establishment of a Superintendent for the Suppression of Thugs that would try Thugs in the Saugor and Nerbudda Territories. Smith argued that Sleeman should be appointed to the office based on his "extensive acquaintance with the habits, haunts, and customs of the Thugs and Phansigars". Governor-General Lord William Bentinck declined to establish a specific office for thuggee, though provided Sleeman with 50 barkandazes (mercenaries) to pursue and apprehend the gangs. Sleeman was appointed Superintendent of the operations, while Smith oversaw the trials, whereby approvers were sent out with troop detachments to disinter the bodies and point out their former associates. Accounts and depositions from Thugs captured around this time would form the basis of Sleeman's writings on thuggee, with the gang leader Feringheea captured by a nujeeb patrol escorted by approvers in November. (Note: Nujeebs were militiamen used by Sleeman as pseudo-police detectives.) Sleeman organised a system of investigation, prosecution, and punishment and institutionalised the use of approvers. To secure approver testimony, he played different factions within the gangs off of one another. Thugs were thereafter convicted based on circumstantial evidence and approver testimony in the Saugor and Nerbudda Territories, which had been established in 1818 outside the scope of the Company's usual regulations.

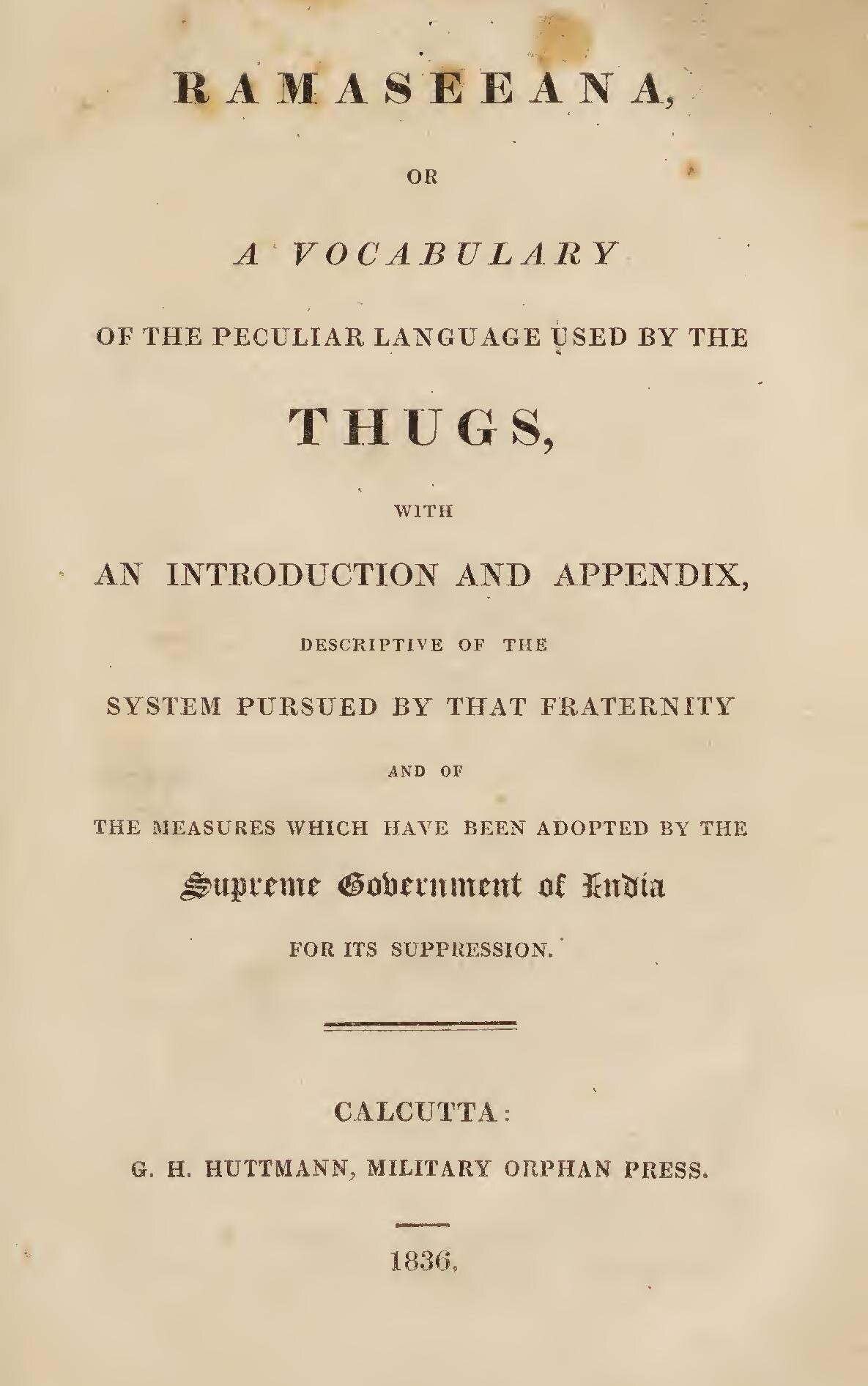
Title page of Ramaseeana

On 5 March 1835, Sleeman was made General Superintendent of the newly established Thuggee Department after Smith declined the post. Sleeman's worsening health forced him to take a period of sick leave in 1835, departing for the Himalayas. He later published his writings made during the November 1835–early 1836 journey in 1844 as Rambles and Recollections of an Indian Official. Sleeman published his main work on thuggee in 1836 entitled Ramaseeana, named after the Thugs' criminal argot 'Ramasee' that he perceived to be the key to uncovering the secrets of thuggee. In it he compiled a vocabulary of Ramasee from conversations with more than a dozen approvers, also printing some of them alongside approver testimony, and published genealogical trees derived from a 1797 Gwalior State tax list of Thugs. During these interviews, Sleeman and his colleague Captain James Paton were predominantly interested in the goddess-worship of the Thugs, their observance of rules and omens, and the variance between different gangs' customs. In the opening lines to Ramaseeana, Sleeman stated: "I am satisfied that there is no term, no rite, no ceremony, no opinion, no omen or usage that they have intentionally concealed from me".

Upon discovering 'river-thugs' operating on the Ganges whose modus operandi left very little circumstantial evidence, Sleeman successfully lobbied for the passage of Act III of 1836 that made simply belonging to a thuggee gang a crime punishable by life imprisonment with hard labour. In March, he recommended that a manufactory be established or found to accommodate the approvers, whereafter the Jubbulpore School of Industry was founded later that year. In a February 1838 letter to his friend Charles Fraser, who had replaced Smith as magistrate of Jubbulpore, Sleeman described their duties as paramount to the interests of humanity and declared: "Believe me Fraser, I would not exchange the share I have had in this work for the most splendid military service that man ever performed in India. I glory in it and ever shall do." Dacoity was added to Sleeman's responsibilities that same year as thuggee activity had been effectively suppressed and in 1839 he coined the term Megpunnaism to refer to the murder of impoverished parents to attain their children for sale, portraying it as a new form of thuggee.

Sleeman initially welcomed his assistants' work in early 1838 arresting bands of religious mendicants, asserting in February that he now had full proof that Gosains and Bairagis were "assassins by profession". However, Sleeman halted the proceedings a couple of months later after the failure of trials against bands of Thoris and Jogis, remarking that had a further case against Jogis gone ahead the evidence was such that "it would have created a feeling of distrust in all that we do which nothing could ever have removed". Sleeman reminded his officers in April 1838 that if they were morally satisfied that the prisoner had belonged to a gang of Thugs but there was not enough evidence to convict them, then it was their duty to detain them indefinitely under Regulation VIII of 1818. In 1839, Sleeman declared that thuggee had been effectively destroyed as an organisation, marking the end of the campaign.

During this period, Sleeman also published works on political economy in which he criticised the economic philosophy of the Company, based on the ideas of utilitarian economists such as David Ricardo, Thomas Malthus, James Mill, Jean-Baptiste Say, and John Ramsay McCulloch. With a view to strengthening British rule, he objected to the accumulation and concentration of wealth in the hands of the Company, perceiving the policies to be undermining law and order. He criticised the Company's economic policy, rooted in the Ricardian theory of rent, for prioritising what he termed "tribute" over expenditure, on the basis that it led to spiralling demand and ultimately an inability to pay into the Company's revenues.

=== Later career ===
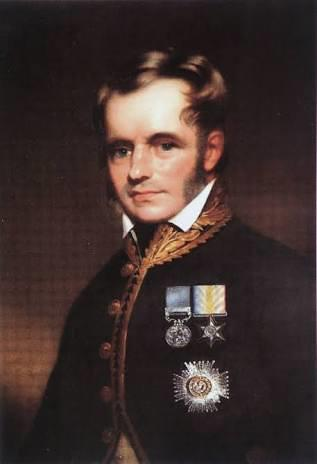
1851 portrait of Sleeman by George Duncan Beechey

In 1842, Sleeman was sent to Bundelkhand to investigate a rebellion under two Bundela landlords, assuming the role of Agent in Bundelkhand. Amid a challenge against the British-backed successor to Maharaja Jankoji Rao Scindia II, Sleeman was appointed Resident at Gwalior in 1843. In the midst of negotiations in December, he counselled Governor-General Lord Ellenborough that marching troops into Gwalior territory would lead to a confrontation. By 1845, and if the Gwalior State is included, Sleeman was responsible for over 100,000 sq mi (260,000 km^{2}) of Indian territory. Sleeman assumed the position of Resident at Lucknow on 11 January 1849, where he was described by the Delhi Gazette in February as being "probably the only British official ever to have addressed the King of Oudh in correct Urdu and Persian". In an 1848 letter to Governor-General Lord Dalhousie, Sleeman argued against the annexation of native states, writing:

If we succeed in sweeping them all away, or absorbing them, we shall be at the mercy of our native army, and they will see it; and accidents may possibly occur to unite them, or a great portion of them, in some desperate act. The thing is possible, though improbable; and the best provision against it seems to me to be the maintenance of native rulers, whose confidence and affection can be engaged, and administrations improved under judicious management.

Sleeman's 1849 Report on Budhuk alias Bagree Decoits set out a methodology for the identification and classification of criminal communities, in which he claimed that Budhuks (Note: Bands of hunters and trappers living in the margins of forests and an alleged class of thieves operating in the Oudh borderlands.) were a pan-Indian cabal under several aliases (which were in reality different jātis). Sleeman toured the Kingdom of Oudh from November 1849 to February 1850, reporting his findings to Lord Dalhousie. In his report, he made clear that Nawab Wajid Ali Shah was an incapable ruler, surrounded by equally incapable administrators, and detailed rampant corruption and exploitation. In his 1852 correspondence with Dalhousie, Sleeman described the King as a "crazy imbecile", stating that the people "want our government". While his characterisation of Oudh's administration proved instrumental in justifying the later annexation of the kingdom, Sleeman himself strongly argued against it, stating in his correspondence to Company chairman Sir James Hogg in 1852–1853:

Were we to take advantage of the occasion to annex or confiscate Oude, or any part of it, our good name in India would undoubtedly suffer; and that good name is more valuable to us than a dozen Oudes... The native States I consider to be breakwaters, and when they are all swept away we shall be left to the mercy of our native army, which may not always be sufficiently under our control. Such a feeling as that which pervaded Bundelcund and Gwalior in 1842 and 1843, must, sooner or later, pervade all India, if these doctrines are carried out to their full extent; and our rule could not, probably, exist under it. With regard to Oude, I can only say that the King pursues the same course, and every day shows that he is unfit to reign... He is neither tyrannical nor cruel, but altogether incapable of devoting any of his time or attention to business of any kind, but spends the whole of his time with women, eunuchs, fiddlers, and other parasites. Should he be set aside, as he deserves to be...

Sleeman favoured the imposition of a British-directed Board composed of members of the Lucknow aristocracy to administrate Oudh in perpetuity or until the heir apparent came of age, upon which they would be bound to govern in accordance with the advice of the British Resident. Historians have since contested Sleeman's characterisation of Wajid Ali Shah and his administration, arguing that his report was based on accounts by people aiming to discredit the King and contained inconsistencies, or that his sympathies with the local population led him to exaggerate the extent of the misrule. Sleeman further asserted to Hogg that the Government had no right to annex the princely states and that these measures were driven by "a school... characterised by an impatience at the existence of any native state."

There are several accounts of attempts on Sleeman's life across his career, including one in Jhansi in 1842 by a dismissed sepoy, an attempt in November 1851 that was allegedly instigated by the Nawab's Munshi, (Note: Writing in 1857, Sleeman's former assistant at Lucknow instead claimed that one of his guards had fallen asleep, fired his musket, and had attempted to conceal the fact.) a bed-stabbing attempt in October 1853, and an incident at his residence with an escaped Thug in 1853. Sleeman's health collapsed in 1854 and he left Oudh to convalesce in the hills, with James Outram taking over the Lucknow Residency in November. In 1855, he was succeeded as General Superintendent for the Suppression of Thuggee by James Sleeman, his nephew. (Note: James had arrived in India in 1827, serving in the Bengal Army before joining the Company's Political Department and participating in the Anti-Thuggee Campaign.) In November, Sleeman wrote to the Government proposing that "predatory tribes", such as the Sansees, Bouriahs, and Kanjars, be subjected to India-wide surveillance, surmising that "petty crime would be considerably diminished". With his health having failed to recover, Sleeman and his wife arrived in Calcutta in January 1856 and embarked on the East Indiaman Monarch to London on 1 February. On the recommendation of Lord Dalhousie, he was formally made Knight Commander of the Order of the Bath on 5 February. Sleeman died on 10 February off the coast of Ceylon, several days after the annexation of Oudh, and was buried at sea.

In 1857, Major R. W. Bird published Dacoitee in Excelsis; or the Spoilation of Oude by the East India Company, in which he accused Sleeman of cynically serving as an instrument in Lord Dalhousie's intentions to annex Oudh. (Note: According to historian Chandni Saxena, Lord Dalhousie also opposed the annexation of Oudh and was overridden by members of his cabinet.) After Oudh rebelled against the Company in May, an 1854–1855 letter by Sleeman protesting the annexation was published in The Times that November. Bird publicly retracted his charges in February 1858 and Sleeman's 1849–1850 report was published later that year as A Journey Through the Kingdom of Oude, together with his correspondence regarding the annexation.

== Legacy ==
In the five years after publication, only 100 copies of Ramaseeana were sold privately, with most of its 750 print run being distributed to Company officials. At least one or two copies made their way to London where it was extensively copied for Edward Thornton's Illustrations of the History and Practices of the Thugs in 1837, while a pirated version was published in the United States in 1839 entitled History of the Thugs or Phansigars of India. In 1839, Phillip Meadows Taylor published the novel Confessions of a Thug, deriving much of his material from Sleeman's writings. Thuggee thereafter became a Victorian sensation, with Ramaseeana forming the basis for the colonial-era account of thuggee. There is a general consensus among contemporary historians against the portrayal of thuggee as a fraternity of ritual stranglers that sacrificed its victims to Kali. Scholars generally agree that Sleeman's representation, derived from his interviews with approvers, was distorted by the prejudices and misinterpretations of the time. The methodology Sleeman set out in his 1849 Report on Budhuk alias Bagree Decoits began to be used in the 1860s to extend special policing measures and penal provisions to various communities, culminating in the passage of the first Criminal Tribes Act in 1871.

Sleeman developed a long-term interest in natural history and in 1828 made the first discovery of dinosaur bones on the Indian subcontinent in the Lameta Formation near Jubbulpore. The fossils were later proposed in 1877 as a new species and genus of dinosaur, Titanosaurus indicus. In his 1844 book Rambles and Recollections of an Indian Official, he described in detail a major 1829 outbreak of neurolathyrism in India. Sleeman provided six accounts in his 1849–1850 report of feral children nurtured by wolves, two he had witnessed himself, which were published separately in 1852 as An Account of Wolves Nurturing Children in Their Dens and are thought to have likely inspired the character of Mowgli in Rudyard Kipling's 1894 novel The Jungle Book. Unusually for British officers at the time, Sleeman took a passionate interest in the lives of Indian peasants and, according to Mike Dash, his detailed writings on Oudh remain the most complete source on the state of the kingdom in the early 19th century. Writing in 2011, the historian Rahul Govind described Sleeman's critique of the Company's economics as "almost unknown".

The village of Sleemanabad, near Jubbulpore, was named in Sleeman's honour, and successive generations of his descendants have continued to visit the village. Sleeman had seven children, two of whom died in infancy, with the remaining five being sent to be educated in England due to the harsh Indian climate. In 1933, his grandson James L. Sleeman published the book Thug: Or a Million Murders in which he described thuggee as an "ancient religion of murder" and the Anti-Thuggee Campaign as "yet another jewel in the crown of Empire". Alongside Thug: Or a Million Murders, popular history books such as Francis Tuker's The Yellow Scarf: The Story of the Life of Thuggee Sleeman in 1961 and George Bruce's The Stranglers: The Cult of Thuggee and its Overthrow in British India in 1968 exaggerated Sleeman's role in the campaign at the expense of his contemporaries. According to historian Máire ní Fhlathúin, they presented Sleeman as a "master detective", with Feringheea often cast as the "master criminal". Kim A. Wagner describes these works as "historical fiction" verging on colonial hagiography and characterises Sleeman as an opportunist who sensationalised thuggee. He also asserts his view that Sleeman did not construct the colonial stereotype and undermine Indians' rights with the aim of expanding British authority. In her 1973 bestseller Heaven's Command: An Imperial Progress, Jan Morris described Sleeman as "a figure of Cromwellian integrity".

=== In popular culture ===
The 1959 film The Stranglers of Bombay centres around the discovery of a thuggee sect and its defeat by an officer of the East India Company. The film ends with a quote attributed to Sleeman: "If we have done nothing else for India, we have done this good thing." In the 1977 Satyajit Ray film The Chess Players, Prime Minister of Oudh Ali Naqi refers to Sleeman and his negative report, the text of which is used for some of James Outram's dialogue. In the 2014 historical fiction novel The Strangler Vine by Miranda Carter, the protagonist, a British officer, encounters Sleeman in Jubbulpore and becomes suspicious of his system for reclaiming Thugs.

== Selected works ==
- Sleeman, W. H. (1829). On taxes, or public revenue, the ultimate incidence of their payment, their disbursement, and the seats of their ultimate consumption. London: Smith, Elder, and Co. Cornhill. Originally printed in Calcutta in 1827.
- ——— (1836). Ramaseeana: Or A Vocabulary of the Peculiar Language Used by Thugs (PDF). Calcutta: G. H. Huttman, Military Orphan Press.
- ——— (1837). Analysis and review of the peculiar doctrines of the Ricardo, or new school, of political economy. Serampore Press.
- ——— (1839). A report on the system of Megpunnaism, or the murder of indigent parents for their young children (who are sold as slaves) as it prevails in the Delhie territories, and the native states of Rajpootana, Ulwar and Bhurtpore. Serampore Press.
- ——— (1840). Report on the depredations committed by the Thug gangs of upper and central India, from the cold season of 1836-37, down to their gradual suppression, under the operation of the measures adopted against them by the supreme government, in the year 1839. Calcutta: G. H. Huttman, Bengal Military Orphan Press.
- ——— (1844). Rambles and Recollections of an Indian Official, Vol. 1. London: J. Hatchard and Son. Both volumes revised and annotated in 1915 by Vincent A. Smith.
- ——— (1849). Report on Budhuk alias Bagree decoits and other gang robbers by hereditary profession and on the measures adopted by the Government of India for their suppression. Calcutta: Bengal Military Orphan Press.
- ——— (1858). A Journey Through the Kingdom of Oude, in 1849–1850: With Private Correspondence Relative to the Annexation of Oude to British India. Vol. 1. London: R. Bentley.
- ——— (1858). A Journey Through the Kingdom of Oude, in 1849–1850: With Private Correspondence Relative to the Annexation of Oude to British India. Vol. 2. London: R. Bentley.

== Decorations and honours ==
- Knight Commander of the Order of the Bath – 5 February 1856
- Army of India Medal (NEPAUL clasp) – 1851
- Gwalior Star
- Nepal Medal

== Bibliography ==
- Bayly, C. A. (1996). Empire and Information: Intelligence Gathering and Social Communication in India, 1780–1870. Cambridge University Press. ISBN 978-052-166-360-1.
- Bhatnagar, G.D. (1968). Awadh Under Wajid Ali Shah. Varanasi: Bharatiya Vidya Prakashan.
- Brown, Mark (2014). Penal Power and Colonial Rule. Abingdon; New York: Routledge. ISBN 978-113-894-481-7.
- Carrano, Matthew T.; Wilson, Jeffrey A.; Barrett, Paul M. (2010). "The History of Dinosaur Collecting in Central India, 1828–1947". In Moody, R. T. J.; Buffetaut, E.; Naish, D.; Martill, D.M. (eds.). Dinosaurs and Other Extinct Saurians: A Historical Perspective. London: Geological Society. pp. 161–173. ISBN 978-186-239-311-0.
- Chakraborty, Ayusman (2021). "Were Thugs of India religious terrorists or mere bandits? The evidence of Hockley's Pandurang Hari". Academia Letters (198): 2–3. doi:10.20935/AL198.
- Cohn, Dan F.; Paleacu, Diana (2001). "Neurolathyrism". In Rose, F. Clifford (ed.). Twentieth Century Neurology: The British Contribution. London: Imperial College Press. pp. 219–225. ISBN 978-1-84816-166-5.
- Dash, Mike (2005). Thug: The True Story of India's Murderous Cult. London: Granta. ISBN 978-1-86207-846-8.
- Dube, Reena (2005). Satyajit Ray's The Chess Players and Postcolonial Film Theory. Basingstoke: Palgrave Macmillan. ISBN 978-140-394-629-4.
- Encyclopædia Britannica (1911). Chisholm, Hugh (ed.). Sleeman, Sir William Henry. Vol. 25 (11th ed.). pp. 237–238.
- Fhlathúin, Máire ní (2001a). ""That solitary Englishman": W.H. Sleeman and the biography of British India". Victorian Review. 27 (1): 69–85. doi:10.1353/vcr.2001.0003.
- Fhlathúin, Máire ní (2001b). "The Travels of M. de Thévenot through the Thug Archive". Journal of the Royal Asiatic Society. 11 (1): 31–42. JSTOR 25188082.
- Fisher, Michael H. (1981). "British Expansion in North India: The Role of the Resident in Awadh". The Indian Economic and Social History Review. 18 (1): 69–82. doi:10.1177/001946468101800104.
- Fujiwara, Chris (2019). "Gothic Journeys: Travel and Transportation in the Films of Terence Fisher". In Bayman, Louis; Pinazza, Natália (eds.). Journeys on Screen: Theory, Ethics, Aesthetics (PDF). Edinburgh University Press. pp. 199–214. ISBN 978-147-442-184-3.
- Govind, Rahul (2011). "Revenue, rent... profit? Early British imperialism, political economy and the search for a differentia specifica (inter se)". Indian Economic and Social History Review. 48 (2): 177–213. doi:10.1177/001946461104800202.
- Herman, Jeanette (2005). "Men and Women of Feeling: Conventions of Sensibility and Sentimentality in the Sati Debate and Mainwaring's The Suttee". Comparative Literature Studies. 42 (2): 223–263.
- Hotchkiss, Jane (2001). "The jungle of Eden: Kipling, wolf boys, and the colonial imagination". Victorian Literature and Culture. 29 (2): 435–449. doi:10.1017/s1060150301002108. S2CID 162409338.
- Iftikhar-ul-Awwal, A. Z. M. (1990). "Anti-Dacoity Drive in Mid-Nineteenth Century Bengal". Journal of the Asiatic Society of Bangladesh. 35 (1): 89–105. SSRN 2588704.
- Luard, C. E.; Sheopuri, Rai Sahib Pandit Dwārka Nāth (1908). Gwalior State Gazetteer. The Central India State Gazetteer Series. Vol. 1. Calcutta: Superintendent Government Printing.
- Lunt, Andrew Paul (2020). Crime, Mobility and State-Building in Western India, c. 1850 – 1920 (PDF). PhD diss. (Thesis). School of History, University of Leeds.
- Mohabey, Dhananjay M. (2011). "History of Late Cretaceous Dinosaur finds in India and current status of their study". Journal of the Palaeontological Society of India. 56 (2): 127. Bibcode:2011JPalS..56..127M. doi:10.1177/0971102320110201.
- Perris, Jonathan (2025). ""Thuggee in London!": Metropolitan Sensationalism and the Invention of the Thug". Victorian Literature and Culture. 53 (2): 207–232. doi:10.1017/S1060150325000014.
- Piliavsky, Anastasia (2013). "The Moghia Menace, or the Watch Over Watchmen In British India". Modern Asian Studies. 47 (3): 751–779. doi:10.1017/S0026749X11000643. JSTOR 24494166.
- Rawat, Maneesh; Mukherjee, Jenia (2025). "'Discipline and Punish': A Historical Account on the Jubbulpore School of Industry in Central India". Journal of the Asiatic Society. 67 (1): 1–22.
- Reeves, P. D. (1971). Sleeman in Oudh: An Abridgement of W. H. Sleeman's A Journey through the Kingdom of Oude in 1849–50. Cambridge University Press. ISBN 052-108-034-7.
- Saxena, Chandni (2016). "Role of William Henry Sleeman in the annexation of Awadh-1856" (PDF). Kanpur: Chhatrapati Shahu Ji Maharaj University.
- Shafique, Muhammad; Ali, Muhammad Yasir; Warraich, Imtiaz Ahmad (2019). "Beyond Utilitarianism: Nineteenth Century South Asian Economic Crises and Sleeman's (1788–1856) Necessitarianism". Review of Economics and Development Studies. 5 (4): 847–851. doi:10.26710/reads.v5i4.916. S2CID 212837831.
- Singha, Radhika (1998). A Despotism of Law: Crime and Justice in Early Colonial India. Delhi: Oxford University Press. ISBN 978-019-564-049-6.
- Smith, Vincent A. (1915). "Memoir of Maj.-Gen. Sir William Henry Sleeman, K.C.B.". In Sleeman, W. H. (ed.). Rambles and Recollections of an Indian Official. London: Oxford University Press. pp. xxi–xxx.
- Smith, Vincent A. (1919). The Oxford History of India: From the Earliest Times to the End of 1911. Oxford: Clarendon Press.
- Stubbings, Matthew (2016). "British Conservatism and the Indian Revolt: The Annexation of Awadh and the Consequences of Liberal Empire, 1856–1858". Journal of British Studies. 55 (4): 728–749. doi:10.1017/jbr.2016.73. JSTOR 26598928.
- Tuker, Francis (1977). The Yellow Scarf: The Story of the Life of Thuggee Sleeman. London: White Lion. OCLC 578826920. Originally published in 1961.
- Van Woerkens, Martine (2002). The Strangled Traveler: Colonial Imaginings and the Thugs of India. Chicago, London: University of Chicago Press. ISBN 978-022-685-086-3.
- Wagner, Kim A. (2004). "The Deconstructed Stranglers: A Reassessment of Thuggee". Modern Asian Studies. 38 (4): 931–963. doi:10.1017/S0026749X04001258. JSTOR 3876674.
- Wagner, Kim A. (2007a). Thuggee: Banditry and the British in Early Nineteenth-Century India. New York: Palgrave Macmillan. ISBN 978-0-230-59020-5.
- Wagner, Kim A. (2007b). "Thuggee and Social Banditry Reconsidered". The Historical Journal. 50 (2): 353–376. doi:10.1017/S0018246X07006103. JSTOR 4140134.
- Wheeler, Stephen Edward (1897). "Sleeman, Sir William Henry". Dictionary of National Biography. Vol. 52. New York; London: The Macmillan Company; Smith, Elder, & Co. pp. 373–374.
- Zingg, Robert M. (1940). "Feral Man and Extreme Cases of Isolation". The American Journal of Psychology. 53 (4): 487–517. doi:10.2307/1417630. JSTOR 1417630.
