= Countess of Devonshire =

Countess of Devonshire may refer to:

- Penelope Blount, Countess of Devonshire (1563–1607)
- Elizabeth Cavendish, Countess of Devonshire (1619–1689)
- Christian Cavendish, Countess of Devonshire (died 1675)
