= The Devonshire =

Historic place in Indiana, United States

- Devonshire
- U.S. National Register of Historic Places
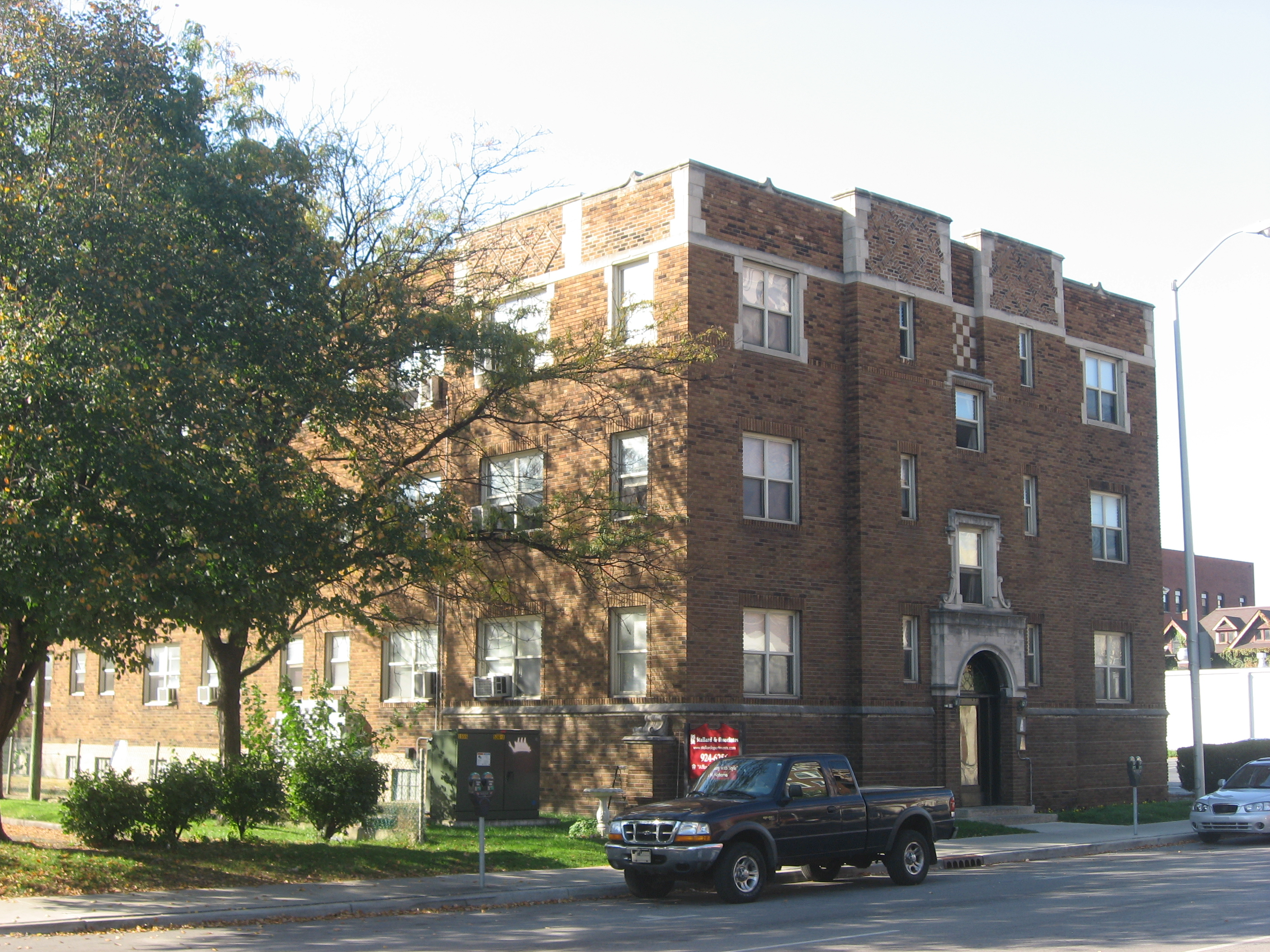
- The Devonshire, October 2010

- Location within Indianapolis Location within Indianapolis Location within Indiana Location within the United States
- Location: 412 N. Alabama St., Indianapolis, Indiana
- Coordinates: 39°46′24″N 86°9′9″W
- Area: less than one acre
- Built: 1929
- Architectural style: Tudor Revival
- MPS: Apartments and Flats of Downtown Indianapolis TR
- NRHP reference No.: 83000067
- Added to NRHP: September 15, 1983

The Devonshire is a historic apartment building located at Indianapolis, Indiana. It was built in 1929, and is a three-story, three-bay-by-nine-bay, Tudor Revival style brown wire cut brick building. It features a recessed central entrance bay, limestone arched entrance, and brick and stone checkerwork at the third floor level.

It was listed on the National Register of Historic Places in 1983.

== See also ==
- Massachusetts Avenue Commercial District
- Apartments and Flats of Downtown Indianapolis Thematic Resources
- National Register of Historic Places listings in Center Township, Marion County, Indiana
