= Philip Meadows Taylor =

British colonial administrator and novelist (1808–1876)

Philip Meadows Taylor CSI
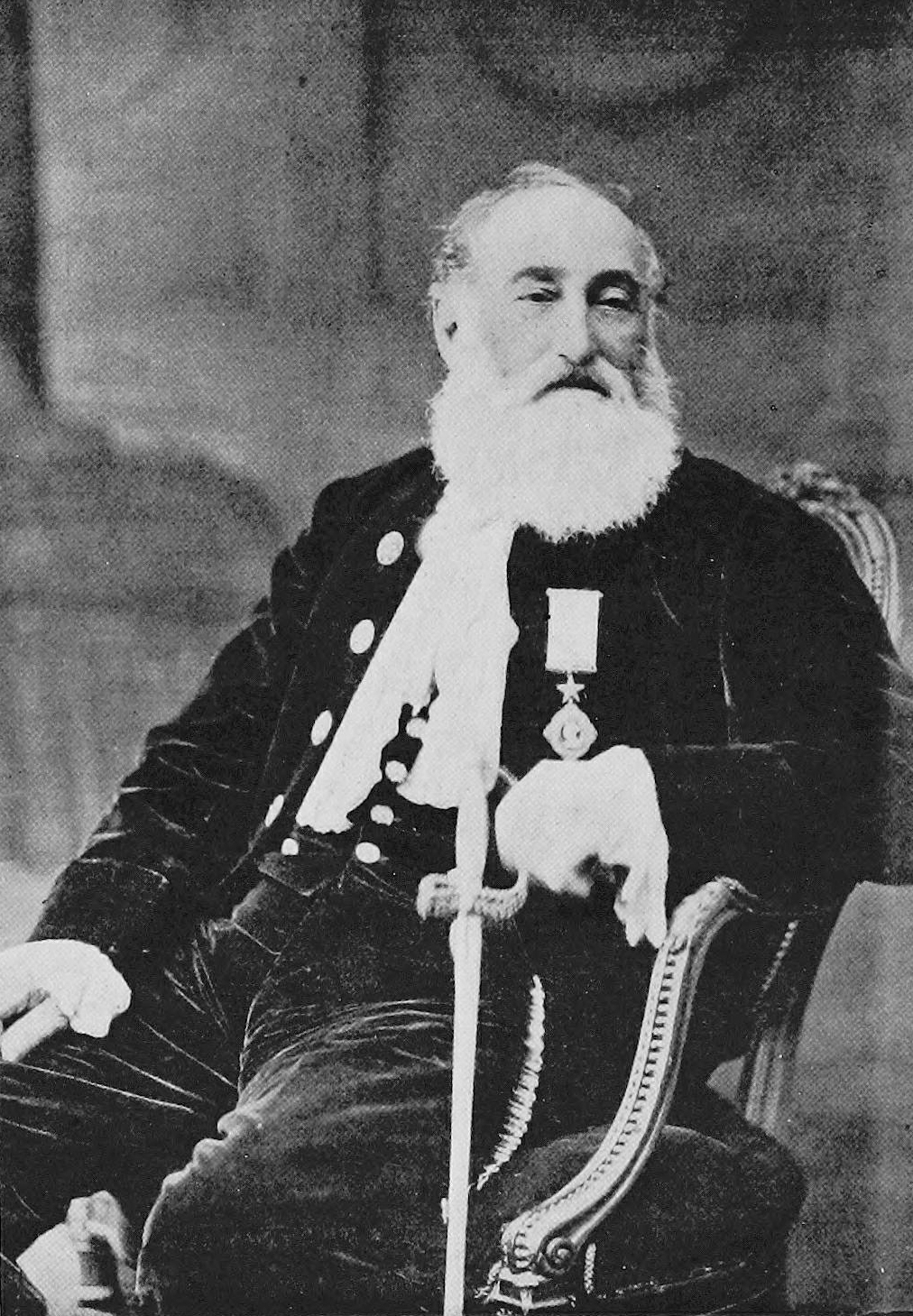
- Taylor in 1873
- Born: 25 September 1808; Liverpool, England
- Died: 13 May 1876 (aged 67); Menton, France
- Notable work: Confessions of a Thug
- Spouse: Mary Palmer (m. 1832, d. 1844)

Philip Meadows Taylor CSI (25 September 1808 – 13 May 1876) was a British officer and administrator in the Hyderabad state, and later British India. He was also a novelist, best known for his 1839 bestseller Confessions of a Thug, and an amateur archaeologist. After Confessions of a Thug, Taylor wrote a series of historical romance novels set against the backdrop of important events in Indian history.

== Biography ==
Taylor was born in Liverpool on 25 September 1808 where his father, Philip Meadows Taylor, was a merchant. His mother was Jane Honoria Alicia, daughter of Bertram Mitford of Mitford Castle, Northumberland.

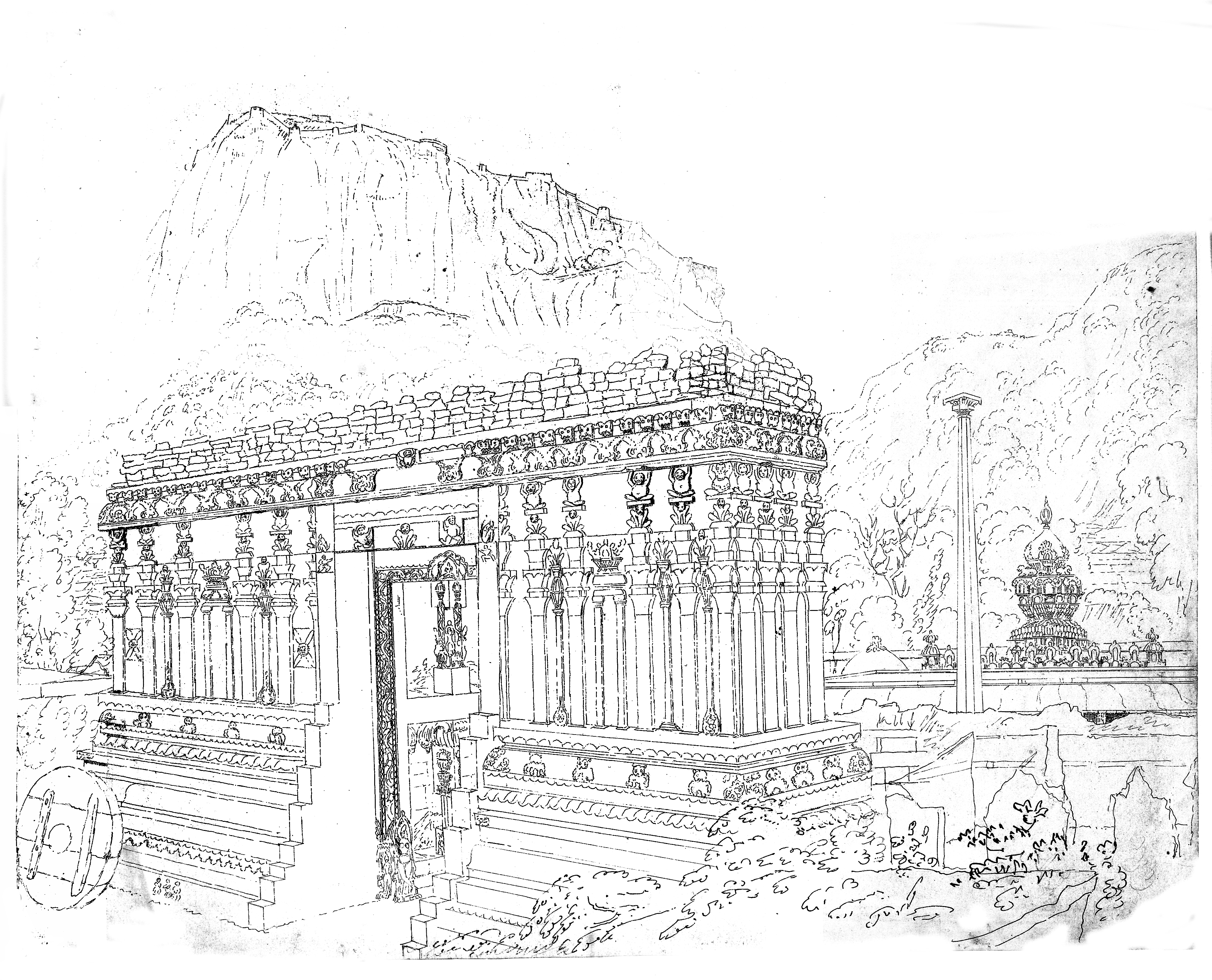
Pen and ink sketch of Bhoga Nandeeshwara Temple by Taylor, c. 1834

In 1824, at the age of 15, Taylor was sent out to India to become a clerk to a Bombay merchant, Mr Baxter. However, Baxter was in financial difficulties and, with the help of family connections, Taylor became a lieutenant in the army of the Nizam of Hyderabad in November. In 1826, he obtained civil employment as Assistant Superintendent of Police for the south-western districts of Hyderabad before returning to the Nizam's infantry in 1830. According to Kim A. Wagner, though Taylor variously presented with the rank of captain or colonel, it remains unclear whether he ever formally held them.

Taylor developed a wide-ranging interest in Indian languages, art, and architecture, and was also an amateur archaeologist and an illustrator. He undertook archaeological explorations of the Hyderabad state between the 1830s and 1850s, and became an influential figure in the early study of megaliths in India. In 1832, Taylor married Mary Palmer of a wealthy Anglo-Indian family.

=== Confessions of a Thug ===
Taylor began writing his first novel in 1837, which was published in 1839 on his return to England on furlough as Confessions of a Thug. The novel drew its material from William Henry Sleeman's 1836 book Ramaseeana on Thuggee (thought at the time to be a religious sect of highway robbers) and presented itself as a discovered manuscript on the confessions of Ameer Ali, a "real-life" Thug informant. Confessions of a Thug humanised Taylor's Thug protagonist and dramatised Sleeman's interviews with thuggee informants. It became an instant bestseller, with Taylor claiming that Queen Victoria requested the pre-publication proofs of the book.

In his autobiography, published in 1877, Taylor claimed that he had been on the verge of uncovering thuggee in 1829 before being recalled to his regiment and forced to abandon his investigation, writing: "Had I been allowed to remain, I should have been the first to disclose the horrible crime of Thuggee to the world; but it fell to the good fortune of Major Sleeman to do so afterwards". He also claimed to have become involved in the Anti-Thuggee Campaign by 1832. According to Wagner, there is no evidence that he was ever part of the operations against thuggee and his name is not present in the archival records. Taylor also claimed to have written an 1833 anonymous letter on the Thugs that was later attributed to a Thuggee Department assistant based in Hyderabad.

=== Later life and writings ===
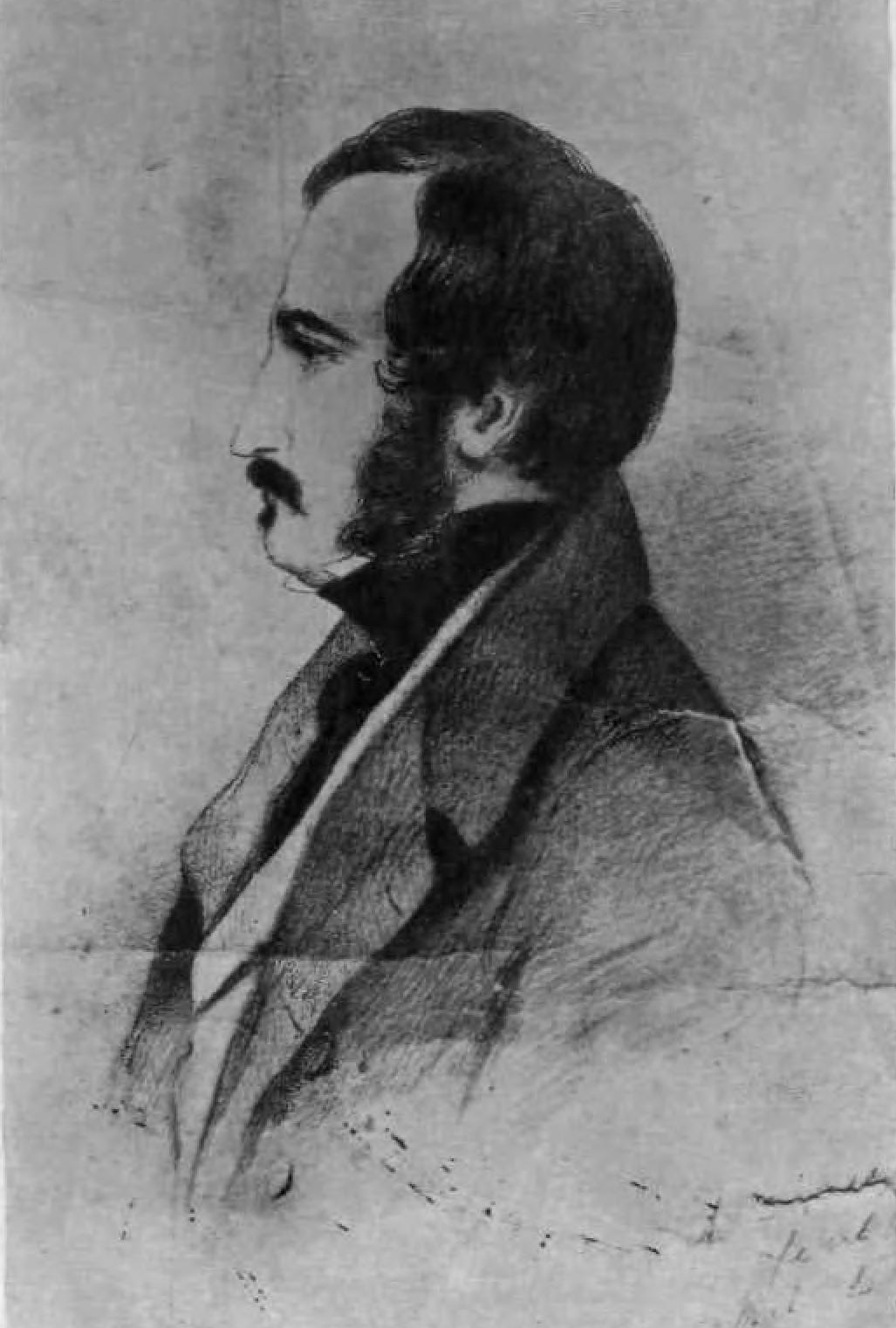
Taylor in 1840

Taylor's second novel Tippoo Sultaun: A Tale of the Mysore War (1840), a historical romance set during the reign of Tipu Sultan, was similarly successful. Taylor was appointed Political Agent at Shorapur in 1841, whereafter he forced the defiant regent and widow of the late raja to abdicate in place of Venkatappa Nayaka, her infant son. Venkatappa acceded to the throne in 1853, with Taylor subsequently appointed Deputy Commissioner of the Nuldrug district, which had been ceded to the British East India Company. Between 1840 and 1853, he acted as a correspondent for The Times. Taylor maintained control of the Buldhana district during the Indian Rebellion of 1857 and was appointed commissioner of Shorapur in 1858, after its confiscation in the aftermath of the rebellion.

Taylor retired to Dublin in 1860 due to ill health. He returned to writing fiction and published a trilogy of historical romances: Tara: A Mahratta Tale (1863), set during the rise of the Marathas in the late 1650s, Ralph Darnell (1865), set against the backdrop of the 1757 Battle of Plassey, and Seeta (1872), on the repercussions of the 1857 rebellion. Though he was self-taught, Taylor also presented papers on engineering, archaeology, and architecture, as well as Indian music and literature, and published A Student's Manual of the History of India in 1871. He was made a Companion of the Order of the Star of India in 1869 and, after being debilitated by an attack of jungle fever, Taylor died on 13 May 1876 in Menton, en route to England. (Note: He had been invited to return to India in 1875 by the Hyderabad minister, with this being his return journey.) His final novel A Noble Queen: A Romance of Indian History, centring on a 16th century Deccan queen defending her state from a Mughal invasion, was serialised in 1875 before being published posthumously in 1878. Taylor completed his autobiography The Story of My Life in 1874, with it being published in 1877, edited by his daughter.

== Legacy ==
After going through two editions in four months, Confessions of a Thug continued to be reprinted into the turn of the 20th century. Its popularity gave birth to a literary tradition, with authors such as Eugène Sue and Mark Twain writing about the subject. Wagner describes it as having remained "the quintessential novel on thuggee". Due to the resemblance of his novels to the historical romances of Walter Scott, Taylor came to be dubbed "the Scott of India". Taylor's novels prominently featured native characters and portrayed Indian scenery and customs sympathetically. They were also characterised by uncommonly liberal views on interracial marriage, race relations, and Indian religious practices. Mortimer Wheeler later described Taylor as the only proper archaeologist of South Asia, commending his sketch-records.

== Selected works ==
=== Fiction ===
- Taylor, Philip Meadows (1839). Confessions of a Thug. London: Richard Bentley. 2005 edition.
- ——— (1840). Tippoo Sultaun: A Tale of the Mysore War. London: Richard Bentley. 1880 edition.
- ——— (1863). Tara: A Mahratta Tale. Edinburgh: William Blackwood & Sons. 1879 edition.
- ——— (1865). Ralph Darnell. Edinburgh: William Blackwood & Sons. 1879 edition
- ——— (1873). Seeta. London: Henry S. King & Co. 1989 edition.
- ——— (1878). A Noble Queen: A Romance of Indian History. London: Kegan Paul & Co. 1892 edition.

=== Non-fiction ===
- ——— (1941). Megalithic Tombs and Other Ancient Remains in the Deccan. The Archaeological Department of Hyderabad. Collection of papers from The Journal of the Bombay Branch of the Royal Asiatic Society (Vols. III–IV, 1851–52) and the Transactions of the Royal Irish Academy (Vol. XXIV, Pt. Ill, 1862).
- ——— (1869). "On Prehistoric Archaeology of India". The Journal of the Ethnological Society of London. 1: 157–177.
- ——— (1871). A Student's Manual of the History of India. Harlow: Longmans. 1906 edition.
- ——— (1877). Taylor, Alice Meadows (ed.). The Story of My Life. Edinburgh: William Blackwood & Sons. 1878 edition.
- ——— (1886). Tobacco: A Farmer's Crop. London: Edward Stanford.
- ——— (1947). Cadell, Patrick (ed.). The Letters of Philip Meadows Taylor to Henry Reeve. London, New York, Bombay: Oxford University Press.

== Arms ==
Coat of arms of Philip Meadows Taylor
| Notes Confirmed 24 January 1870 by Sir John Bernard Burke, Ulster King of Arms. Crest A leopard passant Proper charged on the shoulder with a trefoil slipped Vert. Escutcheon Sable a lion passant Argent in chief a trefoil slipped Or. Motto Incorrupta Fides |

== Bibliography ==
- Chisholm, Hugh, ed. (1911). "Taylor, Philip Meadows" . Encyclopædia Britannica. Vol. 26 (11th ed.). Cambridge University Press.
- Finkelstein, David (1990). A study of the works of Philip Meadows Taylor (PhD thesis). University of Edinburgh.
- Garnett, Richard (1898). "Taylor, Meadows" . In Lee, Sidney (ed.). Dictionary of National Biography. Vol. 55. London: Smith, Elder & Co.
- Guha, Sudeshna (2013). "Photographs and Archaeological Knowledge". Ancient Asia. 4 (4): 4. doi:10.5334/aa.12314. S2CID 140605426.
- Kennedy, Kenneth A. R. (2000). God-Apes and Fossil Men: Paleoanthropology of South Asia. Ann Arbor: University of Michigan Press. ISBN 047-211-013-6.
- Perris, Jonathan (2025). ""Thuggee in London!": Metropolitan Sensationalism and the Invention of the Thug". Victorian Literature and Culture. 53 (2): 207–232. doi:10.1017/S1060150325000014.
- Van Woerkens, Martine (2002). The Strangled Traveler: Colonial Imaginings and the Thugs of India. Translated by Tihanyi, Catherine. Chicago, London: University of Chicago Press. ISBN 978-022-685-086-3.
- Wagner, Kim A. (2007). Thuggee: Banditry and the British in Early Nineteenth-Century India. New York: Palgrave Macmillan. ISBN 978-0-230-59020-5.
- Wagner, Kim A. (2012). "'In Unrestrained Conversation': Approvers and the Colonial Ethnography of Crime in Nineteenth-Century India". In Roque, Ricardo; Wagner, Kim A. (eds.). Engaging Colonial Knowledge: Reading European Archives in World History. London: Palgrave Macmillan. pp. 135–162. doi:10.1057/9780230360075. ISBN 978-1-349-31766-0.
- Wagner, Kim A. (2024). "Introduction". Confessions of a Thug. Oxford World's Classics. Oxford University Press. pp. vii–xxvi. ISBN 978-019-885-464-7.
