= Devonshire class cruiser =

Two classes of cruiser of the Royal Navy are known as the Devonshire class:

- The Devonshire class of six ships launched in 1903–1904
- A subclass of four ships of the County class, launched in 1927–1928
