= Devonshire ministry =

Devonshire ministry may refer to:

- First Devonshire ministry, the British government led by the Duke of Devonshire from 1756 to 1757
- Second Devonshire ministry, the British government led by the Duke of Devonshire from April to July 1757
