= Victorian Review =

- Discipline: Victorian studies
- Language: English
- Edited by: Mary Elizabeth Leighton, Lisa Surridge

Publication details
- Former name(s): Newsletter of the Victorian Studies Association of Western Canada
- History: 1972-present
- Publisher: Johns Hopkins University Press for the Victorian Studies Association of Western Canada (Canada)
- Frequency: Biannually

Standard abbreviations
- ISO 4: Vic. Rev.

Indexing
- ISSN: 0848-1512
- OCLC no.: 680371818

Links
- Journal homepage

Victorian Review: An Interdisciplinary Journal of Victorian Studies is a biannual peer-reviewed academic journal covering Victorian studies, which is published by the Victorian Studies Association of Western Canada. It was established in 1972 as the Newsletter of the Victorian Studies Association of Western Canada, before becoming a peer-reviewed journal in 1989. It publishes research articles, as well as book reviews. The editors-in-chief are Mary Elizabeth Leighton and Lisa Surridge (University of Victoria).
