= Devonshire (East Indiaman) =

Four vessels named Devonshire for the British county of Devon, served the British East India Company (EIC) as East Indiamen:

- Devonshire (1721 EIC ship), of 500 tons (bm), made four voyages for the EIC before she was sold in 1834 and renamed Triumph. Triumph wrecked on the Goodwin Sands in 1737 with the loss of all her complement while sailing to Cadiz for her Spanish owners.
- Devonshire (1736 EIC ship), of 560 tons (bm), was wrecked in 1737 at the mouth of the River Ganges during her first voyage.
- Devonshire (1763 EIC ship), of 637 tons (bm), made four voyages for the EIC before she was sold in 1773 for breaking up.
- Devonshire (1804 EIC ship) made four voyages for the British East India Company (EIC), and was wrecked on her fifth while still outward bound.
