= British Empire in fiction =

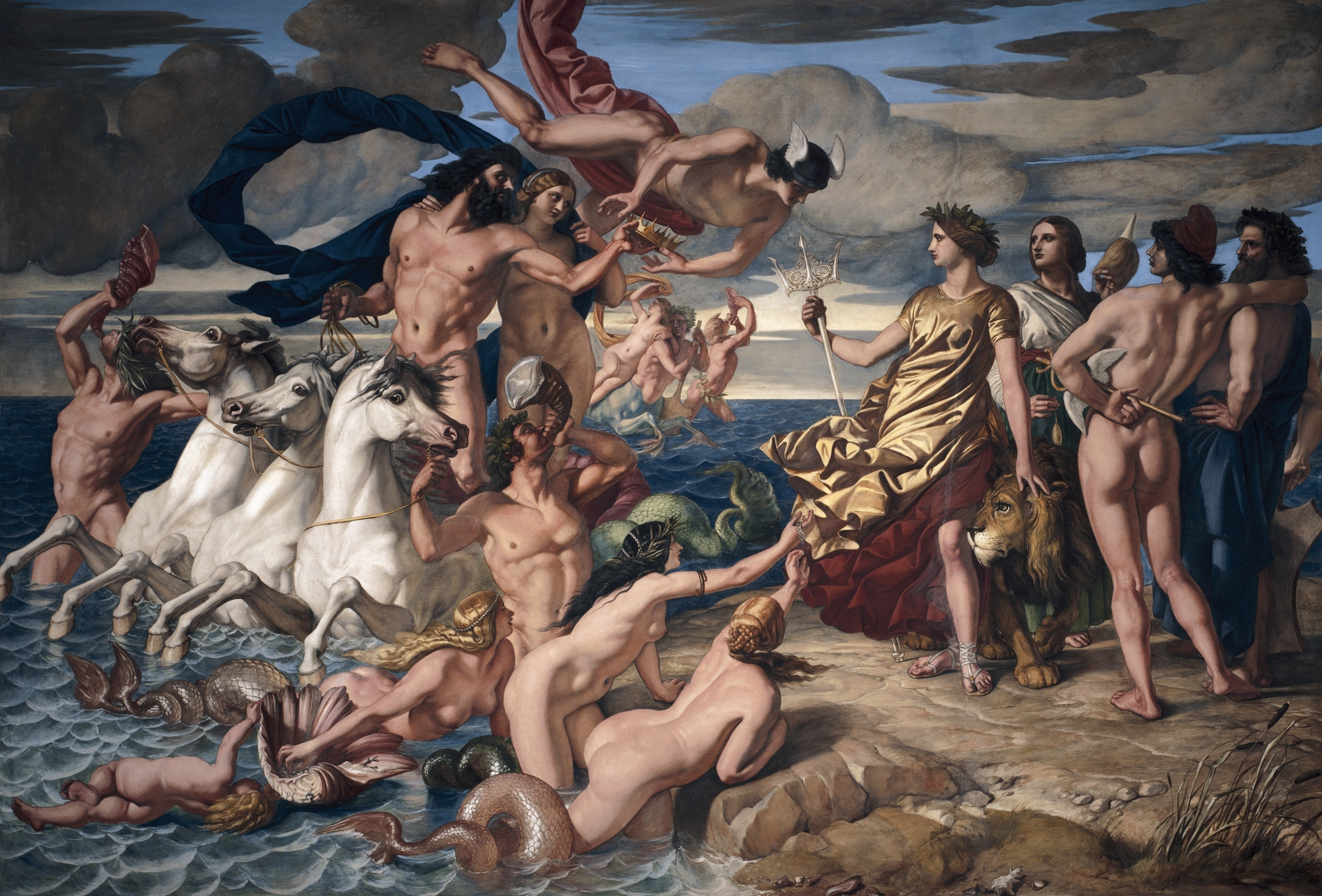
Neptune Resigning to Britannia the Empire of the Sea by William Dyce, 1847.

The British Empire has often been portrayed in fiction. Originally such works described the Empire because it was a contemporary part of life; nowadays fictional references are also frequently made in a steampunk context.

== Historical events ==
This section includes fiction that attempts to re-create historical events.

This is an incomplete list. Please add significant examples in order of date published

=== Prose ===
- The Diamond Rock (1950) by Geoffrey Bennett is set around the garrisoning of Diamond Rock in the Caribbean during the Napoleonic Wars.
- Captain Bligh and Mr. Christian (1972) by Richard Hough is a novel describing the events on the Bounty in 1789.
- Dark Eagle : A Novel of Benedict Arnold and the American Revolution (1999) by John Ensor Harr is a historical account of Benedict Arnold.
- Rise to Rebellion (2001) and The Glorious Cause (2002) are a duology by Jeff Shaara retelling the American Revolution.
- Benedict Arnold: A Drama of the American Revolution in Five Acts (2005) by Robert Zubrin is another historical account of Benedict Arnold, attempting to humanize him and show his multiple dimensions.
- Young Bloods (2006) by Simon Scarrow narrates mostly in alternate chapters, the story of a young Anglo-Irish nobleman Arthur Wesley and the Corsican cadet Naboleone Buonaparte.
- The Generals (2007) by Simon Scarrow sequel to Young Bloods.

=== Films ===
==== Set in Africa ====
- Zulu (1964) is set during the British defence of Rorke's Drift during the Anglo-Zulu War in 1879. Eleven Victoria Crosses were awarded in the action, the most ever awarded to a regiment in a single battle, thus ensuring its place in British military history.
- Khartoum (1966) takes places during the Mahdist War and mainly focuses on the Siege of Khartoum, in which a small Anglo-Egyptian force stationed at Khartoum that was led by General Charles "Chinese" Gordon held out for over ten months against a numerically superior army of Sudanese Rebels before being completely annihilated.
- East of Sudan (1964) is a highly fictionalized story set against the backdrop of the Mahdist War.
- Zulu Dawn (1979) is a prequel to the film Zulu set during the Battle of Isandlwana in 1879 during the Anglo-Zulu War.
- Breaker Morant (1980) is about the court martial of three Australian soldiers during the Second Boer War by the British military authorities.
- White Mischief (1987) film dramatisation of the Happy Valley murder case in Kenya in 1941.
- The Making of the Mahatma (1996) about Gandhi's experiences in South Africa.
- The Four Feathers (2002) directed by Shekhar Kapur. Loosely based on A.E.W. Mason's 1902 novel the movie follows a young man accused of cowardice and his path to redemption during the British army's Gordon Relief Expedition (late 1884 to early 1885) in Sudan. Starring Heath Ledger, Wes Bentley, Djimon Hounsou, Kate Hudson.

==== Set in Australasia ====
- The Mutiny of the Bounty (1916), In the Wake of the Bounty (1933), The Mutiny on the Bounty (1935), Mutiny on the Bounty (1962) and The Bounty (1984) are all film versions of the story of the mutiny on the Bounty in 1789.
- Eureka Stockade (1907), Eureka Stockade (1949) and Eureka Stockade (miniseries) (1984) are about the Eureka Rebellion, during the Victorian gold rush at Ballarat in 1854.
- Botany Bay (1953), a heavily fictionalized story about the First Fleet and convict transportation, set in 1787.

==== Set in Europe ====
- The Charge of the Light Brigade (1936) Set during the Crimean War (although much of the plot is loosely based on the Sepoy Rebellion) and features the titular cavalry charge from the Battle of Balaclava as the film's climax. The infamous charge was also the main subject of a 1968 film of the same name.

==== Set in India ====
- Gunga Din (1939), a George Stevens film based on the poem by Rudyard Kipling.
- Shatranj Ke Khilari (1977), a Satyajit Ray film set in 1856, on the eve of the Indian Rebellion of 1857.
- Junoon (1978), based on the novel A Flight of Pigeons by Ruskin Bond, is set during the backdrop of the Mutiny of 1857.
- Gandhi (1982), about the life of Mahatma Gandhi, leader of the non-violent resistance movement against British colonial rule in India during the first half of the 20th century.
- A Passage to India (1984), based on the 1924 novel of the same name, is a British film about an Indian doctor accused of assaulting an Englishwoman.
- Sardar (1993) a biopic of Vallabhbhai Patel, a political and social leader of India who played a major role in the country's struggle for independence.
- Jinnah (1998), about the life of the founder of Pakistan, Muhammad Ali Jinnah.
- Dr. Babasaheb Ambedkar (2000) about the life of B. R. Ambedkar, an instrumental figure in the Indian Independence movement.
- Veer Savarkar (2000) about the life of Vinayak Damodar Savarkar, an instrumental figure in the Indian Independence movement.
- The Legend of Bhagat Singh (2002), a Bollywood biopic about the life of Bhagat Singh.
- 23rd March 1931: Shaheed (2002), a Bollywood dramatization of the life of Bhagat Singh.
- Mangal Pandey: The Rising (2005) is based on the life of Mangal Pandey and details his role as a leader in the Indian Rebellion of 1857 which led to the downfall of the British East India Company.
- Rang De Basanti (2006), an Indian film with references to, and flashbacks of, the Indian freedom fighters Chandrasekhar Azad, Bhagat Singh, Shivaram Rajguru, Ashfaqulla Khan and Ram Prasad Bismil.

==== Set in the United States ====
- The Scarlet Coat (1955) Film directed by John Sturges, focused on Benedict Arnold.
- John Paul Jones (1959) a biographical epic film about John Paul Jones, the United States Navy officer during the American Revolution.
- La Fayette (1961) Biography of the Marquis de La Fayette, a French diplomat during the American Revolution.
- The Crossing (2000) about George Washington crossing the Delaware River and the Battle of Trenton in 1776.

=== Television ===
- George Washington (1983) TV miniseries starring Barry Bostwick.
- Benedict Arnold: A Question of Honor (2003) is a dramatization of the life of Benedict Arnold who plotted to surrender the American fort at West Point, New York to the British during the American Revolution in 1780.
- John Adams (2008) TV drama series portraying the life of the future president; before, during and after the American Revolution.

== Period fiction ==
This section deals with fictional characters set within the wider backdrop of the British Empire.

This is an incomplete list. Please add significant examples in order of date published

=== Prose ===
==== Set on an isolated island ====
- Robinson Crusoe (1719) by Daniel Defoe: Crusoe finds himself stranded on an isolated Island. From a few belongings he rebuilds English civilization and christens a tribesman. A drama fueled by capitalism, Christian faith and efforts to 'colonialize' and 'civilize' both the island and the tribesman.
- The Coral Island (1857) by R.M. Ballantyne tells the story of three children shipwrecked on a South Pacific island. William Golding parodied the optimism of the book in his satire Lord of the Flies (1954).

==== Set in Africa ====
- King Solomon's Mines (1885) by Sir Henry Rider Haggard introduces Allan Quatermain – a British hunter and explorer, but who displays a remarkably modern attitude to de-colonialization, and shows a great respect for the African cultures. Nevertheless, he is a patriot. Quatermain appears in a total of eighteen stories by Haggard, fourteen of which are novel-length.
- She (1887) by Sir Henry Rider Haggard is the first of four novels featuring Ayesha, also called She-Who-Must-Be-Obeyed, an immortal queen ruling the ruins of the lost African city of Kôr. It features three British adventurers who are captured by Ayesha's subjects. In one of these explorers she recognises the reincarnation of Kallikrates, an ancient Greco-Egyptian priest whom she loved.
- Heart of Darkness (1899) a reflection on the savage Belgian empire compared to Britain's and the many kinds of evil perceived to be in Africa.
- The Four Feathers (1902) by A.E.W. Mason tells the story of British officer Harry Faversham, who resigns his commission from his regiment just prior to the Battle of Omdurman, in the Sudan, in 1898. He questions his own true motives, and resolves to redeem himself in combat, travelling on his own to the Sudan.
- Sanders of the River (1911) by Edgar Wallace, highly popular at the time, and its various sequels – The People of the River (1911), Bosambo of the River (1914), Bones of the River (1923), Sanders (1926), Again Sanders (1928) – focus on the adventures of a British governor in a fictional African colony loosely modeled on Nigeria, where British power in maintained by gunboats sailing up and down a major river. The protagonist is not gratuitously cruel, and by the standards of his time is open-minded towards the culture of the African tribes under his rule. Nevertheless, he (like the author and the general British public at the time) takes for granted the right of Britain to rule over the natives and the necessity of using brute force against any attempt at rebellion.
- Weep Not, Child (1964) by Ngũgĩ wa Thiong'o

==== Set in Asia ====
- "The Sandokan novels" (1888 onwards) by Emilio Salgari portray the eponymous fictional pirate in his struggles against the British Empire.
- Burmese Days (1934) by George Orwell is the somewhat autobiographical story of John Flory and a small, corrupt and bigoted group of British Imperialists living in Burma.
- Tai-Pan (1966) by James Clavell is the second book in Clavell's Asian Saga. It concerns European and American traders who move into Hong Kong in 1841 towards the end of the First Opium War (1839–1842).
- Tournament of Shadows (1978) by Nicholas Carnac, a Great Game adventure set during the 1880s, Captain Mark Aspern finds himself in a private battle with the Tsarist secret agent Colonel Vassily Danin.
- The Singapore Grip (1978) by J. G. Farrell is the final book in Farrell's empire trilogy. It is set in 1939 just before the Japanese invasion of Singapore and is a reflection on the final days of the Empire.
- Noble House (1981) by James Clavell is an epic novel set in Hong Kong in 1963.

===== Set in India =====
- Confessions of a Thug (1839), by Philip Meadows Taylor, a novel about Thuggee cult member Ameer Ali, and his adventures and murders in British India.
- The Man Who Would Be King (1888) by Rudyard Kipling, about two deserters from the British Army discover a hidden kingdom in the mountains and pretend to be gods to control (and rob) the natives.
- The Jungle Book (1894) by Rudyard Kipling, a collection of stories about Mowgli, an Indian feral child in the jungles of 19th-century British India.
- Kim (1901) by Rudyard Kipling portrays an orphan of British descent becoming a spy for Britain. A commentary on how 'British' you can be when you are born overseas.
- King of the Khyber Rifles (1916) by Talbot Mundy. Athelstan King is a secret agent for the British Raj at the beginning of World War I.
- A Passage to India (1924) by E M Forster set against the backdrop of the British Raj and the Indian independence movement in the 1920s.
- Nightrunners of Bengal (1951) by John Masters is set at the time of The Indian Rebellion of 1857. The central character, Captain Rodney Savage, is an officer in a Bengal Native Infantry regiment.
- Bhowani Junction (1952) by John Masters set amidst the turbulence of the British withdrawal from India.
- The Deceivers (1952) by John Masters on the Thuggee movement in India during British imperial rule.
- Raj Quartet (1965 onwards) is a four-volume novel sequence by Paul Scott about the concluding years of the British Raj in India.
- The Ravi Lancers (1972) by John Masters concerns an Indian regiment which is sent to Western Front of World War I.
- The Siege of Krishnapur (1973) by J. G. Farrell is a satirical novel set during the siege of an Indian town during the Indian Rebellion of 1857 from three perspectives: the British, the Indian sepoys and the Indian princes. Its point of view is very much of the early 1970s and, in its dealings with the Empire.
- A Flight of Pigeons by Ruskin Bond (1975) set against the backdrop of the 1857 Sepoy Mutiny.
- The Far Pavilions (1978) by M. M. Kaye is the story of an English officer during the Great Game. Based partly on biographical writings of the author's grandfather.
- Cracking India (1991) by Bapsi Sidhwa details the Indian Independence movement through the eyes of young Lenny Sethna.
- The Piano Tuner (2003) by Daniel Mason is set in 1886, in the jungles of Burma.
- Water (2006) by Bapsi Sidhwa set in 1938 India.
- The Mutiny (2007) by Julian Rathbone set during the 1857 mutiny.
- The Cashmere Shawl (2012) by Rosie Thomas set in pre-WW2 in north-western India during the last years of the British rule in India.

==== Set in Australasia ====
- Picnic at Hanging Rock (1967) by Joan Lindsay is set in Australia in 1900, just before federation. It is about a trip by a party of girls from an exclusive private school, who travel to Hanging Rock in Victoria's Mount Macedon area for a picnic on Valentine's Day.
- Botany Bay (1973) by Charles Nordhoff & James Norman Hall concerning the colonization of Australia in the 18th century.
- The Australians series (1979–1990) by British author Vivian Stuart (writing as William Stuart Long) are twelve novels set during Australia's colonial period from 1788 to 1901 about various characters attempting to establish their place within the British Empire, both at home and abroad.
- Bring Larks and Heroes (1988) by Thomas Keneally winner of the Miles Franklin Award, set in an unidentified British penal colony.
- The Playmaker (1988) by Thomas Keneally set in Australia in 1789 and details a group of convicts staging a play.

==== Set in Canada ====
- The Englishman's Boy Guy Vanderhaeghe (1996) – set on the prairies – then the Northwest Territory and the Cypress Hills Massacre of 1873.

==== Set in Europe ====
- Peter Simple (1834) by Frederick Marryat is about a young British midshipman during the Napoleonic wars. It was originally released in a serialized form in 1833.
- The exploits of Sherlock Holmes (1887 onwards) often involve the Empire. He is asked to save it from treachery in The Adventure of the Bruce-Partington Plans and His Last Bow, where it is revealed that his brother does work for the Foreign Office.
- Death to the French (1932) by C. S. Forester is set during the Peninsula War about a British rifleman behind the French lines.
- The Hornblower Series (1937 onwards) by C. S. Forester chronicle the life of Horatio Hornblower, an officer in the Royal Navy, during the Napoleonic Wars.
- Troubles (1970) by J. G. Farrell is the first novel in Farrell's Empire Trilogy and takes place in Ireland in 1919 around the Irish War of Independence. It involves an Englishman, Major Brendan Archer, who has a prolonged stay in a deteriorating hotel run by a Protestant Anglo-Irish family who stubbornly refuse to leave the country. Winner of the Lost Man Booker Prize

==== Set in the United States ====
- The Leatherstocking Tales (1823 onwards) by James Fenimore Cooper are a series of novels set in colonial North America between 1744 and 1804 featuring the hero Natty Bumppo. The most famous of the series is The Last of the Mohicans set during the French and Indian War.
- The Tree of Liberty (1905) by Elizabeth Page set during the American Revolution.
- Arundel (1933) and its sequel Rabble in Arms (1945) by Kenneth Roberts take place during the campaign to capture Quebec early in the American Revolution.
- Drums Along the Mohawk (1936) by Walter D. Edmonds is set in the Mohawk River Valley during the American Revolution and includes a fictitious representation of the siege of Fort Stanwix.
- Northwest Passage (1937) by Kenneth Roberts centres on the exploits and character of Robert Rogers, the leader of Rogers' Rangers, who were a colonial force fighting with the British during the French and Indian War.
- Oliver Wiswell (1940) by Kenneth Roberts shows American Revolution from a loyalist's perspective.
- Johnny Tremain (1943) Children's novel by Esther Forbes, retells in narrative form the final years in Boston, Massachusetts, prior to the outbreak of the American Revolution.
- April Morning (1961) by Howard Fast depicting the Battle of Lexington and Concord from the perspective of a fictional teenager, Adam Cooper.
- The Kent Family Chronicles (also known as The Bicentennial Series) (1974–1979) Are a series of eight novels by John Jakes written to commemorate the 200th anniversary of the Declaration of Independence of the United States of America. The first two novels, The Bastard (1974) and The Rebels (1975) are set during the American Revolution.

==== Set in various locations ====
- Jules Verne's Around the World in Eighty Days (1873) is in many ways a travelogue of the British Empire as it was at the time of writing – as symbolised by the fact that the protagonists travel halfway around the world and still remain within British territory where British law runs, (and then they go to Japan which at the time of writing was under strong British influence, and from there to the United States, a country created by breakaway British colonists).
- The Aubrey–Maturin series by Patrick O'Brian is a sequence of 20 nautical historical novels, and one unfinished, set during the Napoleonic Wars and centering on the friendship between Captain Jack Aubrey of the Royal Navy and his ship's surgeon Stephen Maturin, who is also a natural philosopher and secret agent. The first novel, Master and Commander, was published in 1969 and the last finished novel in 1999. The 21st novel of the series, left unfinished at O'Brian's death in 2000, appeared in print in late 2004.
- The Light that Failed (1890) by Rudyard Kipling. Most of the novel is set in London, but many important events throughout the story occur in Sudan or India.
- The Flashman Series (1969 onwards) by George MacDonald Fraser shows the British Empire between 1839 and 1891 and from the eyes of the dastardly Flashman – the bully from Tom Brown's Schooldays. Many famous people from the time are mentioned usually in a bad light, or with flaws (e.g. Lord Cardigan, in Flashman and Flashman at the Charge)
- The Thorn Birds by Colleen McCullough (1977) Set in various places including New Zealand at the end of the 18th century.
- The Sharpe Series (1981 onwards) A series of books which follow the career of Richard Sharpe from India, through the Napoleonic Wars and beyond.

=== Theatre ===
- H.M.S. Pinafore (1878) by Gilbert and Sullivan is a comic opera and satire set aboard the (fictional) eponymous Royal Navy vessel.
- The Devil's Disciple (1901) by George Bernard Shaw is the fictional story of Richard Dudgeon, a Patriot in the Revolutionary War.
- 1776 (1969) Broadway musical set during the American Revolution.
- Our Country's Good (1988) by British playwright Timberlake Wertenbaker telling the story of Convictism in Australia in the late 1780s.
- Indian Ink (1995) by British playwright Tom Stoppard, takes place in the British Raj in 1930.

=== Audio ===
- Revolting People (2000–2006) is a BBC Radio 4 situation comedy set in colonial Baltimore, Maryland, just before the American Revolutionary War.
- The Jewel in the Crown (2005) is a BBC Radio 4 adaptation of the first book of The Raj Quartet.

=== Films ===
==== Set in Africa ====
- The Four Feathers (1915 onwards) Seven film adaptations have been made of the M. M. Kaye novel.
- Safari (1956) set in Kenya during the Mau Mau Uprising. Directed by Terence Young, starring Janet Leigh, Roland Culver, John Justin and Earl Cameron.
- Odongo (1956) set in Kenya. A falls in love with a vet. Filmed simultaneously with Terence Young's Safari.
- Guns at Batasi (1964) set in Africa during the last days of the Empire.
- East of Sudan (1964) set in Sudan in the 1880s
- Out of Africa (1985) set in Kenya and based loosely on the autobiographical book of the same name written by Isak Dinesen (the pseudonym of the author Karen Blixen), which was published in 1937.
- Wah-Wah (2005) drama film, written and directed by British actor Richard E. Grant and loosely based on his childhood in Swaziland.

==== Set in Asia ====
- The Planter's Wife (1952) about a family living in British Malaya.
- Tai-Pan (1986) is an adaptation of the novel.
- The Man Who Would Be King (1975), a film of the novel.
- Ip Man 2 (2010), a fictionalized story about Wing Chun master Ip Man in British Hong Kong.

===== Set in India =====
- The Green Goddess (1923 film) and The Green Goddess (1930 film) are two films depicting a group of British citizens who crash in India and are threatened with execution by the local Raja.
- Bonnie Scotland (1935) A comedy which sees Laurel and Hardy join a Scottish regiment and sent to India.
- Gunga Din (1939) loosely based on the poem by Rudyard Kipling combined with elements of his novel Soldiers Three. The film is about three British sergeants and their native water bearer who fight the Thuggee, a religious cult of ritualistic stranglers in colonial India.
- Kim (1950) An adaptation of the Kipling novel starring Errol Flynn.
- King of the Khyber Rifles (1952) A half-caste British officer in 19th-century India battles the prejudices of both his Army colleagues and the local populace while trying to help put down a rebellion led by a greedy local ruler. Adapted from the Talbot Mundy novel.
- Bhowani Junction (1956) is an adaptation of the novel set amidst the turbulence of the British withdrawal from India.
- Carry On... Up the Khyber (1968) is a comedy film starring Sid James as Queen Victoria's Governor in the British India province of Khalabar near the Khyber Pass.
- Shatranj Ke Khilari (1977) based on Munshi Premchand's short story of the same name, set in 1856 and shows the life and customs of 19th-century India on the eve of the Indian rebellion of 1857.
- Junoon (1978) chronicles the period of 1857 to 1858 when the soldiers of the East India Company mutinied and many smaller kingdoms joined the soldiers in the hope of regaining their territories from the British.
- Kranti (1981) A film taking place in 19th-century British India and is the story of the fight for independence from the British in the years spanning from 1825 to 1875. It tells the story of two men who led the war against British Rule, Sanga (Dilip Kumar) and Bharat (Manoj Kumar) both of whom call themselves Kranti.
- A Passage to India (1984) film of the book of the same name.
- Kim (1984) A second adaptation of the Kipling novel.
- The Deceivers (1988) a film of the novel by John Masters on the Thuggee movement in India during British imperial rule.
- Earth (1998) is set in Lahore before and during the partition of India.
- Hey Ram (2000), a film set against the backdrop of the Indian Independence movement.
- Lagaan (2001), set in late 19th-century India, follows a cricket game between British officers and local Indian villagers.
- Kisna: The Warrior Poet (2005) set during the last days of the British in India.
- Water (2005) a film set in 1938 India and a sequel to the 1998 film "Earth".
- Gunga Din(1939) a film about three British sergeants and Gunga Din, their native bhisti (water bearer), who fight the Thuggee, a cult of murderous Indians in colonial British India.

==== Set in Australasia ====
- Picnic at Hanging Rock (1975) adaptation of the 1967 novel.
- Utu (1983) about a Māori soldier in the British army during 1870s New Zealand.

==== Set in the Caribbean ====
- The Black Swan (1942) a fictionalized account of Henry Morgan after he was made Governor of Jamaica, loosely based on the novel of the same name.

==== Set in Europe ====
- HMS Defiant (1962) about a mutiny aboard the fictitious ship of the title during the Napoleonic Wars.
- Gallipoli (1981) Australian film, directed by Peter Weir and starring Mel Gibson, about several young men from rural Western Australia who enlist in the Australian Imperial Force during World War I. They are sent to Turkey, where they take part in the Gallipoli Campaign.

==== Set in the United States ====
- The Last of the Mohicans (1909 and onwards) is one of many a dramatizations of the second of the Leatherstocking Tales series.
- 1776, or The Hessian Renegades (1909) film by D.W. Griffith set during the American Revolution.
- Scouting for Washington (1917) Film set during the American Revolution made by Edison Studios.
- The Spirit of '76 (1917) Film set during the American Revolution.
- Cardigan (1922) Film set during the American Revolution.
- America (1924) D W Griffith's unsuccessful film set during the American Revolution.
- The Buccaneer (1938 and 1958) Two fictionalized films of the pirate Jean Lafitte during the War of 1812.
- Drums Along the Mohawk (1939) An adaptation of the novel.
- Sons of Liberty (1939) Film set during the American Revolution starring Claude Rains and Gale Sondergaard, directed by Michael Curtiz.
- The Howards of Virginia (1940) An adaptation of The Tree of Liberty.
- Johnny Tremain (1957) Film adaptation of the novel starring Hal Stalmaster and directed by Robert Stevenson.
- The Devil's Disciple (1959) An adaptation of the play.
- John Paul Jones (1959) Film directed by John Farrow, starring Robert Stack and Charles Coburn. Set during the American Revolution.
- Chingachgook the Great Serpent (1967) is an East German adaptation of one of the Leatherstocking Tales.
- 1776 (1969) Film adaptation of the Broadway musical.
- Revolution (1985) stars Al Pacino as a New York fur trapper during the American Revolutionary War.
- April Morning (1987) Adaptation of the novel starring Chad Lowe, Tommy Lee Jones, and Robert Urich.
- The Patriot (2000) is a fictional film about a farmer who fights against the British during the American Revolution-based very loosely on Francis Marion.

=== Television ===
- The Buccaneers (1956) A series about a reformed pirate in the early 18th century.
- Hawkeye and the Last of the Mohicans (1957) one of several dramatizations loosely based on the Leatherstocking Tales series. Another well known adaptation is the 1971 BBC version.
- The Swamp Fox (1959–1960) TV series produced by Walt Disney and starring Leslie Nielsen. Nielsen played the role of American Revolutionary War hero Francis Marion.
- Daniel Boone (1964–1970) TV series loosely depicting the life of Daniel Boone.
- The Recruiting Officer (1965 and 1973) Two adaptations of the play.
- The Young Rebels (1970–1971) Television Series about a group of youthful guerrillas fighting on the Patriot side in the American Revolutionary War.
- Sandokan (1976) is a loose adaptations of the novel series, with the hero a prince fighting for independence for his island from the British.
- The Far Pavilions (1983) a three part television adaptation of the book.
- The Jewel in the Crown (1984) is a reflection on Indian independence and the post imperial feelings in Britain when the series was produced. Based on the first book of The Raj Quartet.
- Noble House (1988) is an adaptation of the novel set in the late 1980s.
- Sharpe (1993 onwards) Adventure TV series starring the dashing Richard Sharpe, played by Sean Bean. Set during the Napoleonic Wars, the series regularly attracted high-profile guest stars.
- The American Revolution (1994), TV miniseries starring Kelsey Grammer and Charles Durning; directed by Lisa Bourgoujian.
- Hornblower (1998 onwards) is a series of loose adaptations of the novels.
- All the King's Men (1999) BBC dramatization of the disappearance in action of men of the Royal Norfolk Regiment at Gallipoli in 1915.
- Liberty's Kids (2002 onwards) A 40-part children's animated television series produced by DiC Entertainment set during the American Revolution.

== Other fiction ==
This section also has works with fictional characters set in the Empire, but also include supernatural or fantastical elements.

This is an incomplete list. Please add significant examples in order of date published

=== Prose ===
- The War of the Worlds (1898) by H. G. Wells is a classic novel in which Martian invaders land in the early years of the 20th century, occupy London and much of England for several months and use the inhabitants as food animals.
- The Anubis Gates (1983) by Tim Powers shows the exploits of the empire in Egypt lead to a magical revenge plotted by Egyptian natives, but their failure to destroy the Empire leaves gates in time, which are exploited by businessmen in the twentieth century.
- The Tales of Alvin Maker series (1987 onwards) takes place in an alternate history of the American frontier in the early 19th century, where the United States is much smaller and New England is still a colony of a republican England where the Restoration never occurred. Instead, the House of Stuart is exiled to the Americas, establishing the Crown Colonies in the Carolinas.
- Great Work of Time (1991) by John Crowley, a secret society created by the will of Cecil Rhodes attains time travel, enabling it to prevent the two World Wars and preserve the British Empire until the end of the twentieth century – though creating difficult new problems.
- Anno Dracula (1992) by Kim Newman takes place in a world where Count Dracula was not killed by van Helsing and has gone on to court and marry Queen Victoria, ushering in a new age of vampirism in the world.
- Soldier of the Queen (1996) by Barbara Hambly is a spin-off from the Wells classic The War of the Worlds included in the War of the Worlds: Global Dispatches anthology. It depicts the Martian invasion of India and ends with Gandhi using the situation to gain Indian Independence nearly fifty years ahead of our timeline.
- Dowager Empress of China (1996) by Walter Jon Williams Another story in the War of the Worlds: Global Dispatches collection. It ends with the Chinese using the same situation to successfully shake off British and other European colonial tutelage, and become a major world power already in the early 1900s.
- In Darwinia (1998), by Robert Charles Wilson, Europe (including Britain) suddenly disappears in 1912 and is replaced by a strange land, of roughly the same shape but without humans and with very strange flora and fauna. In the resulting world, Lord Kitchener manages to hold together the British Empire despite the loss of its centre and despite revolts in Egypt and other colonies, and embarks on the re-colonization of Britain (the rebuilt London is mentioned as "a wild frontier town of several tens of thousands' population").
- The Witches of Chiswick (2003) by Robert Rankin is a time-travelling adventure story taking place primarily in the 19th and 23rd centuries.
- The Bartimaeus Trilogy (2003, 2004, and 2005) by Jonathan Stroud is set in an alternate present in which magicians are the ruling-class of Britain and its Empire. Open rebellion at home and in the American colonies takes place in Ptolemy's Gate, the third book of the trilogy.
- Larklight (2006) by Philip Reeve is set in a Victorian era universe, where mankind has been exploring the solar system since the time of Isaac Newton.
- The Temeraire series (2006 onwards) by Naomi Novik is set during an alternate history version of the Napoleonic Wars, in which dragons not only exist but are used as a staple of aerial warfare in Asia and Europe.
- Pirates of the Caribbean: The Price of Freedom (2011), by A.C. Crispin, is set 13–18 years before the first three Pirates of the Caribbean films during Captain Jack Sparrow's young adulthood. The book details Jack Sparrow's life as a merchant seaman for the British East India Trading Company, where he meets Cutler Beckett and captains the merchant ship Wicked Wench, and the circumstances in which he is branded as a pirate, his ship sunk, and makes a deal with Davy Jones to raise his ship from the depths, which he rechristens as the Black Pearl.

=== Comics ===
- "The Wolf of Kabul", a British spy in the North-West Frontier Province, who appeared in story papers and comics from 1930 to the mid-1980s.
- "Fraser of Africa" was a strip in the Eagle in 1960–1961, following the adventures of a white hunter in colonial Tanganyika.
- Waltz in a White Dress (1990–1995), a Japanese manga series set in the 1930s, depicts the British Empire's antagonistic relationship with the Indian independence movement and the Empire of Japan.
- Heart of Empire (1999) by Bryan Talbot is the sequel to The Adventures of Luther Arkwright and is set mostly in a parallel world where due to an extension of the English Civil War, Britain did not gain an Empire until the early 21st century.
- The League of Extraordinary Gentlemen (1999) by Alan Moore depicts an empire protected by Dr. Jekyll, Allan Quatermain and other fictional characters from Victorian fiction.
- Scarlet Traces (2002) and its sequel Scarlet Traces: The Great Game (2006) by Ian Edginton and D'Israeli are Steampunk sequels to H.G. Wells' The War of the Worlds in which Martian technology has been exploited by Britain.
- The 2000 AD comic series contains a character called Harry Kipling published from 2006 and set in an alternate steampunk version of the British Empire called Neo-Britannia.
- H. G. Wells' The War of the Worlds (2006) an adaption of the novel.
- Gutsville (2007) by Simon Spurrier and Frazer Irving chronicles the descendants of colonial settlers living in Gutsville, a shanty town within the belly of this mysterious creature.

=== Audio ===
- Jubilee, a 2003 Doctor Who audio play, is set in an alternate world in which a new "English Empire" emerged after the Doctor defeated a Dalek invasion in 1903.
- The Space 1889 audio dramas (2005 onwards) are based on the roleplaying game where Thomas Edison invented a means of traveling between planets and the major European powers have each established colonies in space.

=== Films ===
- Gunga Din (1939) is set in India in 1880.
- The Pirates of the Caribbean franchise features the British Empire. In the first film, The Curse of the Black Pearl has the Royal Navy forces led by Governor Weatherby Swann and Commodore James Norrington, against pirates Captains Jack Sparrow and Hector Barbossa. The Empire is mentioned by Governor Swann as the East India Trading Company led by Lord Cutler Beckett serve a more villainous role in a war against piracy in the second and third films, Dead Man's Chest and At World's End. The fourth film, On Stranger Tides, features Captain Barbossa serving as a privateer for King George II of Great Britain to find the Fountain of Youth before the Spanish Royal Navy serving King Ferdinand VI of Spain, only to enter an uneasy alliance with Jack Sparrow against Blackbeard and Angelica, leading his British crew to death as well as allow the Spanish to destroy the Fountain. The fifth film, Dead Men Tell No Tales, the British Navy Lieutenant John Scarfield names the British Empire as his goal to kill the "witch" Carina Smyth and acquire the Trident of Poseidon, only to be killed by the Spanish Navy ghost Captain Armando Salazar.
- The League of Extraordinary Gentlemen (2003), a film adaptation of the Alan Moore comic.
- Steamboy (2004) – An anime film which features the British government and Robert Stephenson developing Steampunk machinery to use against a large arm-dealing empire in the heart of London.

=== Television ===
- The Time Tunnel episodes The Last Patrol (1966), The Night of the Long Knives (1966) and Raiders From Outer Space (1967) all feature the protagonists travelling to periods involving the Empire.
- Doctor Who story Pyramids of Mars (1975) is partially set in Egypt in 1911.
- Sandokan (1992 and 1998) are two children's animated versions of the novel series, with the hero a prince fighting for independence for his island from the British.
- The Young Indiana Jones Chronicles (1992–1993) features several episodes set in the British Empire.
- The Secret Adventures of Jules Verne (2000) a science fiction television series depicting the revelation that Jules Verne did not merely write the stories behind his famous science fiction classic books, but actually experienced these adventures personally.
- Doctor Who story Empress of Mars (2017) sees British soldiers occupying Mars in 1881, assisted by an Ice Warrior.

=== Computer games ===
- Age of Empires III (2005) and its expansions feature campaigns set at various stages of British history including the Seven Years' War, American Revolution and Indian Mutiny.
- Assassin's Creed 3 (2012) which is set during the American Revolutionary War.
- Empire: Total War (2009) a strategy game in which players can build the British Empire.

== Alternative histories ==
The alternate history section details books that examine what would have happened if history had unfolded differently. A common feature of stories written by American authors is a British victory in the revolutionary war. For novels in which Britain is defeated by Nazi Germany in 1940, see Axis victory in World War II and Category:Alternate Nazi Germany novels.

This is an incomplete list. Please add significant examples in order of date published

- Anno Domini 2000, or, Woman's Destiny (1889) by former Prime Minister of New Zealand Sir Julius Vogel is set in a speculative future. In the 2000 depicted by Vogel, women have gained full suffrage and hold many positions of high authority, the main protagonist Hilda Fitzherbert becoming Undersecretary for Home Affairs, Imperial Prime Minister and Empress Consort during the course of the novel. Also, the British Empire federated, gained territories in the form of northern France, Belgium and the United States (but lost Ireland) and has a migratory unicameral Imperial Legislature.
- He Walked Around the Horses (1948) by H. Beam Piper features alternate history timeline where the American War of Independence and the French Revolution were both suppressed and there were no Napoleonic Wars.
- Bring the Jubilee (1953) by Ward Moore is set in an alternate reality where the Confederacy became independent in 1864, conquering all of Latin America and becoming a world power by the twentieth century whilst the United States became a backward, impoverished rump state. The British Empire is mentioned in passing several times, being ruled by William V during the early twentieth century and allied to the Confederacy, with British North America never becoming Canada, India being granted self-government in the Nineteen Thirties by a Labour government and a Zionist state being established in Uganda.
- The Warlord of the Air (1971) by Michael Moorcock concerns the adventures of Oswald Bastable, an Edwardian-era soldier stationed in India, and his adventures in an alternate universe wherein World War I never happened and the British Empire, knit together by airships, still dominates the world and acquires new territory. (Ecuador is mentioned as a British colony.)
- A Transatlantic Tunnel, Hurrah! (1972) by Harry Harrison. The American War of Independence fails and mainland America and Britain are joined by a tunnel.
- For Want of a Nail: If Burgoyne Had Won at Saratoga (1973) by Robert Sobel depicts an alternate history in which John Burgoyne emerged victorious from the Battle of Saratoga, ultimately defeating the American rebels.
- In the timeline of Richard C. Meredith's At the Narrow Passage (1973), first volume of his Timeliner Trilogy (1973–1978), the British had suppressed both the American Revolution and the French Revolution, the second leading to their annexation of France. In the 20th century, American colonial troops serve Britain loyally in a decades-long trench warfare waged on French soil against the armies of the centralized Holy Roman Empire. Other Americans support the underground ARA (American Revolutionary Army) and plot rebellion.
- In The Alteration (1976) by Kingsley Amis the Reformation did not happen, with the Catholic Church becoming an international secular power and 'Schismatic' religion being practiced only in the Republic of New England in North America. The English Empire is mentioned to include West England (Ireland), North England (probably Scotland), India and Indochina (which it won from the French in 1815).
- The Difference Engine (1990) by William Gibson and Bruce Sterling posits an alternate reality where Charles Babbage successfully built a mechanical computer, setting the information revolution into full swing by 1855. The British Empire is more powerful in this timeline, having America split into several other countries (namely a rump United States, the Confederate States, the Republic of Texas, the Republic of California and a terra nullius), opening up Japan to Western trade and holding an entente with the Second French Empire.
- The Two Georges (1995) by Harry Turtledove & Richard Dreyfuss depicts an alternate history world in which the American War of Independence did not take place thanks to a constitutional settlement worked out in the early 1770s. By 1995, the North American Union is a self-governing dominion within the British Empire subject to terrorist acts by the nativist and separatist Sons of Liberty. The British Empire also includes Australia, New Zealand, South Africa, India, large sections of West Africa and protectorates over Hawaii, the Ottoman Empire and China.
- The Southern Victory Series (1997–2007) by Harry Turtledove is set in a universe where the Confederate States successfully broke away from the United States in 1862 with the two nations becoming sworn enemies. Throughout the series, the British Empire is allied with the Confederacy.
  - In How Few Remain, Great Britain pressured the United States into recognising Confederate independence in 1862. Later, the British Empire, alongside France, aids the Confederacy in fighting to U.S. by launching naval bombardments against Great Lakes towns and San Francisco and a cavalry attack from Saskatchewan during the Second Mexican War (1881–1882) (albeit on the condition that the Confederacy abolish slavery).
  - In the Great War trilogy, the British Empire and the Confederacy are Entente Powers fighting the Central Powers (including the United States) during the First Great War (1914–1917). Due to a Central Powers victory, the U.S. annexes most of Canada (with George Armstrong Custer as governor-general), Newfoundland, the Bahamas, Bermuda and the Sandwich Islands and forces Britain to recognise the Republic of Quebec and a unified Republic of Ireland.
  - In the Settling Accounts tetralogy, the British Empire, the Confederacy and the other Entente Powers (mostly headed by authoritarian, nationalist governments) fight the Central Powers in the Second Great War (1941–1944). Britain fights the German and Austro-Hungarian Empires on the European continent and attempts to re-annexe Ireland, whilst Canadians fight a guerrilla war against the U.S., employing the use of technicals and people bombs. After Japan failed to capture the Sandwich Islands and Midway from the U.S., it abandoned the Allied war effort and annexed several European colonies in Asia (including British Malaya). The British Empire is ultimately forced to surrender after Germany drops superbombs on London, Norwich and Brighton.
- The Peshawar Lancers (2002) by S. M. Stirling, has a timeline where a heavy meteor falls in 1878 devastating the northern hemisphere, with survivors degenerating into savagery and cannibalism, but the British Empire succeeded in moving its centre to India. With its capital in Delhi, what is now known as The Angrezi Raj is still the dominant world power in the 21st century, controlling India, Australia, New Zealand, Southern Africa, Madagascar, the Batavian Republic and colonial outposts in Britain, Ireland, Northern Europe and North America. In the Viceroyalty of India, the ruling classes increasingly tending to adopt Indian cultural traits such as the taboo on eating beef.
- The Year of the Hangman (2002) by Gary Blackwood, an alternative history in which Washington was killed and the rebels lost the War of Independence.
- The Code Geass anime series (see below) contains the novel Our Days (2006).
- 2012: The War for Souls (2007) by Whitley Stieber: The British Empire is one of four empires in an alternate universe, which also includes the French Empire, the Russian Empire, and a small American Empire.
- Pax Britannia (2007 onwards) by Jonathan Green and Al Ewing is a novel series published by Abaddon Books set in a modern steampunk world where the British Empire, and Queen Victoria, still rule the world.
- TimeRiders: The Eternal War (2011) by Alex Scarrow, in which Britain entered the American Civil War on the side of the Confederacy, turning the war into an unending stalemate. Without the United States to challenge its dominance, the British Empire continued to expand, and by 2001 it controls half the world.
- In the short story "The Charge of Lee's Brigade" by S.M. Stirling, included in Alternate Generals, volume 1, the American Revolution never happened, so Virginia and most of North America remain under British rule; in the mid-19th century, Brigadier General Sir Robert E. Lee and his lieutenants, including Jeb Stuart, fight against the Russians in an analogous Crimean War. The background shows Queen Victoria far more ambitious than in our timeline, having already annexed both the Ottoman Empire and Japan.
- In the post-apocalyptic alternate history Emberverse novels (2004–2018) by S. M. Stirling, where suddenly the laws of nature changed and modern technology stopped functioning, there is a new British Empire consisting of Britain, part of Ireland and Prince Edward Island in Canada, as well as France and Spain (which were less able to adjust to the great change). With modern technologies gone, this Britain reverted in many ways to earlier times, with the Monarch once again wielding real power and knights wearing armor and fighting on horseback.
- The New England series (2018 onwards) (Note: The New England series by James Philip consists of Empire Day (2018), Two Hundred Lost Years (2018), Travels Through The Wind (2019), Remember Lost Achilles (2019), George Washington's Ghost (2020), and Imperial Crisis (2020)) by James Philip is set in North America in 1976 – two-hundred years after the American Revolution was crushed at the Battle of Long Island. The British Empire still rules the waves and North America is a patchwork of twenty-nine squabbling decentralized colonies. Canada, Australia and New Zealand are members of Britain's recently created Commonwealth, while India and its vast holdings in Africa are still treated as colonies. The Pax Britannia that has been in place since the 1860s is beginning to fail and the empires of Spain, France, Germany, Turkey, Russia, and Japan are jostling for position.

=== Comics ===
- Ministry of Space (2001) depicts a world where the British benefited from Nazi technological research instead of the US and Russia, seeing them win the space race and preserving the Empire.
- The Code Geass anime series (see below) contain the manga books Lelouch of the Rebellion, Suzaku of the Counterattack and Nightmare of Nunnally all published in 2006.

=== Audio ===
- The Code Geass anime series (see below) contain the radio series' The Rebellion Diary and Lots about the Rebellion broadcast in 2006.

=== Television ===
- The Sliders episode The Prince of Wails (1995) takes place in an alternate reality in which the American Revolution was won by the British. The British States of America (which includes California) is a heavily taxed, dictatorially-governed colony.
- Code Geass – Lelouch of the Rebellion (2006) is an anime depicting a futuristic British Empire based in North America after being driven out of the British Isles that had conquered one-third of the world's landmass including Japan, Greenland, New Zealand, Philippines, the Americas and parts of the Middle East under absolute monarchy.
- The Futurama episode All the Presidents' Heads (2011) partly takes place in an alternate reality where the American Revolutionary War was won by Great Britain, resulting in the unification of all of North America into West Britannia by 3011.

== Speculative futures ==
There are many examples of speculative fiction were a British empire different from the historical empire is featured, but these cannot be called alternative realities, as they are not written from the point of view of a change in the past but as speculations about the future.

This is an incomplete list. Please add significant examples in order of date published

=== Prose ===
- The Battle of Dorking (1871) by George Tomkyns Chesney established a new genre of fiction relating to the Empire – invasion literature, in which various powers attempt (or succeed) to invade Britain or the Empire. In The Battle of Dorking this is an unnamed power that happens to speak German, catches Britain off guard and leaves Dorking devastated for fifty years.
- The Great War in England in 1897 (1894) by William Le Queux is another invasion literature novel depicting the invasion of Britain by the French with their Cossack allies, with the invading forces penetrating into London – but the British saved in the nick of time by the intervention of their staunch German allies led by the Kaiser...
- Last and First Men (1930) by Olaf Stapledon, a vast vision of humanity's future, mentions the British Empire surviving well into the twenty-first century but becoming increasingly loose, until a cataclysmic war with the United States in which Britain (and the whole of Europe) are destroyed by poison gas. In this war Canada sides with the US; South Africa, India and Australia declare neutrality; while New Zealand remains loyal to Britain and wages a year-long hopeless resistance.
- The Shape of Things to Come (1934) by H. G. Wells, is a future history at the time, The Second World War ends in 1950 with a stalemate and a general collapse of all warring sides. The British Empire retains a shadowy existence (an explicit comparison is made to the last years of the Roman Empire), and until the end of the 1970s sends occasional "Imperial Envoys" to what it still claims as its colonies and protectorates – but exercises little actual power, and is eventually swept away by an emerging world state.
- The Death Guard (1939) by Philip George Chadwick, is a future war story in which a near-invincible army of artificially created soldiers – the flesh guard – falls into the hands of an untrustworthy power, continental Europe forms an alliance and invades Britain. The resulting carnage reduces whole cities and towns in Britain to smoking rubble. The story also features atomic war.
- Warday (1984) by Whitley Strieber and James Kunetka features the United States and Soviet Union devastating each other in a nuclear war in October 1988 as a part of the novel's fictional (then-future) history. Western Europe remains untouched by the war, allowing Britain to step into the vacuum and once again establish itself as the dominant world power (alongside Japan), with the Royal Navy ruling the world's oceans and Britain maintaining an effective tutelage (though no formal rule) over the broken remnants of the US, as well as in other parts of the world (for example Argentina). This is widely regarded as a revival of the British Empire, though the British refrain from using the term.

=== Films ===
- Mutant Chronicles (2008) is a film based on the Mutant Chronicles role-playing game. Set in a distant future, where traditional nation-states of the world have merged into huge corporations. The British faction is called Imperial, and is nominally led by Her Serenity the Queen.
