= Gary Blackwood =

Gary Blackwood may refer to:

- Gary Blackwood (author) (born 1945), American author
- Gary Blackwood (politician) (born 1951), Australian politician
