= The Venus of Konpara =

1960 novel by John Masters

- First edition
- Author: John Masters
- Published: 1960 (Michael Joseph)
- Publication place: United Kingdom
- Pages: 256
- Followed by: The Road Past Mandalay

The Venus of Konpara (1960) is a novel by John Masters which draws on an extreme version of the "Aryan Invasion Theory" model of ancient Indian history, according to which invading Aryan barbarians ruthlessly crushed underfoot the indigenous Dravidian peoples of the country, forcing them into the position of an oppressed underclass.

In 1973 a dramatised version of the novel was broadcast on BBC Radio, starring Liane Aukin and Ian Richardson.

== Plot summary ==
The novel is set in the late nineteenth century, during the British Raj, and follows the adventures of a Rajput prince who is heir to a fictional kingdom based in Deori (roughly comparable to modern Chhattisgarh). He has just returned from his education in England. As a sign of his Anglicisation he plans to build a dam and a cricket pitch on disused land in Konpara, a backward and neglected part of his realm. However, when work begins, a fragment of an ancient statue is recovered. Such is its beauty and sensuousness that it is nicknamed the "Venus of Konpara". He decides to excavate the area in search of other remains. Meanwhile, he has been seduced by a Dravidian dancing girl, who becomes his live-in lover and who seems to have a mysterious control over the local people.

The prince's uncle, however, plans to displace him as successor to the throne and works in tandem with other mysterious hidden factions to disrupt the excavations. The local British administrator assists the prince, though with some reservations. The administrator is deeply resentful of his liberated wife, an artist who works in an avant-garde style similar to Manet. Her creativity disturbs his rigid and sexually repressed personality.

As excavations proceed it becomes clear that there are systematic attempts to misdirect the dig, and even to threaten the lives of the central characters, who are attacked by the local Gond tribesmen. The British administrator is drawn into the plot against the prince, and the dancing girl is abducted. All ends happily for the main characters after the administrator is killed when he accidentally pricks himself with a poisoned arrow meant for the prince. The dancing girl is rescued and marries the prince. The administrator's widow marries another character who admires her work, and she becomes a famous artist.

== Use of Aryan invasion theory ==
The novel is notable for its use of the extreme "invasionist" model of Indo-Aryan migration into India, but for portraying the Aryans in a negative manner characteristic of post-World War II anti-Nazi sentiment and Dravidianist ideology of the era. It turns out that the disruptions to the dig arose from an attempt by a group of Brahmins to conceal evidence of a terrible massacre committed by the Aryan invaders, who had built a monument to their victory and had thrown to their deaths thousands of Dravidian workers who had created it. The monument, dedicated to Indra, is eventually uncovered, containing a large wall-carving depicting the Aryans crushing their enemies, and emphasising the racial differences between the two groups.

The defeated masses were small and squat, their faces somewhat exaggeratedly simian, sometimes beautiful, but always different, with their broad cheekbones and square shapes, from the tall, straight-nosed, lank-haired heroes who destroyed them and their works.

However, further investigation reveals that a later chamber was added in which the merging of the two peoples was celebrated. Again, in tandem with ideas of the time, Aryan culture is presented as authoritarian, while Dravidian culture is portrayed as sensuous. The dancing-girl is revealed to be a modern incarnation of the spirit of Dravidianism, whose marriage to the Indo-Aryan hero represents the reinvigoration of distinctive Indian identity.
