= Nightrunners of Bengal =

1951 book by John Masters

- First edition
- Author: John Masters
- Language: English
- Publisher: Michael Joseph
- Publication date: December 1951
- Publication place: United Kingdom
- Media type: Print (Hardback & Paperback)
- Pages: 381 pp
- OCLC: 2067032

Nightrunners of Bengal is the title of the first novel by John Masters. It is a work of historical fiction set against the background of the Indian Rebellion of 1857. It was published in 1951 in the United Kingdom by Michael Joseph, London, and in the United States (also 1951) by the Viking Press, New York.

The novel at first attracted criticism from reviewers, who objected to the depiction of Indians and what they perceived as overly graphic descriptions of acts of violence. However, it was made the American Literary Guild's Book of the Month on publication, and was widely sold.

== Plot introduction ==
It introduced the fictional Savage family, whose history of service in British India rather resembled that of Masters' ancestors.

== Plot summary ==
The novel is set in the Presidency of Bengal at the time of the Indian Rebellion of 1857. The central character, Captain Rodney Savage, is an officer in a Bengal Native Infantry regiment, stationed in the fictional city of Bhowani (which is in about the same location as the real city of Jhansi). He is restless with garrison life, but is devoted to his regiment and its sepoys (Indian soldiers).

In spite of his empathy with the sepoys, Savage does not realise that fear and resentment are driving them to intrigue with local rulers and other conspirators against the rule of the East India Company. The complacent life of the British community in Bengal is shattered by the Rebellion. Most of the British officers of the Bhowani garrison and their families (including Savage's wife) are killed in the outbreak or are subsequently murdered.

Savage escapes the massacre along with his infant son and an English woman, Caroline Langford. The small group of refugees are sheltered by sympathetic Indian villagers. For some time Savage's sense of betrayal and loss drives him into blind hatred of all Indians and he kills an Indian officer who was his friend. Eventually the humanity and tolerance of the villagers, combined with his growing love for Caroline, enable him to recover from his near insanity. On reaching the British forces gathering to suppress the rebellion, Savage finds that they also have become infected with a desire for violent reprisals.

In a final clash, an emotionally torn Savage fights against his own former regiment. A charge by Indian cavalry who have remained loyal to the British turns the tide of battle. The "nightrunners" in the title are messengers who distributed chapatis shortly before the outbreak of the rebellion. This mysterious historic incident remains unexplained. Though a fictional account the story is based on the events that occurred in the Jhansi State during the Rebellion and several characters are modeled on historical personages.

== Principal characters ==
- Rodney Savage – captain in the fictional 13th Rifles, Bengal Native Infantry
- Caroline Langford – an Englishwoman visiting India who becomes Savage's new love
- Sumitra Devi, Rani (queen) of Kishanpur – female regent of the semi-independent princely state of Kishanapur. Loosely based on the historical Rani of Jhansi.
- Dewan of Kishanpur – chief minister under the Rani
- "The Silver Guru" – revered ascetic holy man (revealed towards the end as an Irish deserter from the British army and leper)
- Dellamain Mr – East India Company commissioner to Kishanapur and senior British civilian official in Bhowani.
- Risaldar Rikirao Purohit – a veteran Indian officer who leads the cavalry charge

== Relations with other books in the series ==
Coromandel! (1955) Takes place in the 17th century, when an English youth named Savage runs away to sea and ends up in India – starting the family's centuries-long history of serving there.

The Deceivers is about Rodney's father, William, who suppresses the Thugee. William's butler, Sher Dil, also appears in Nightrunners of Bengal, now an old man, and working for Rodney. Piroo, an ex-Thug who was one of William's band in The Deceivers also appears in this book. He guides the English survivors to safety, amused at the irony that he is saving the son and grandson of the man who nearly had him hanged.

Rodney Savage appears as a middle-aged colonel, now married to Caroline, in The Lotus and the Wind and in Far, Far the Mountain Peak as an elderly retired general. He also makes a final appearance in The Ravi Lancers as a very old but still vivid man in 1915, who meets his younger relative, one of that book's main two protagonists. The elder Savage speaks then with concern of the conduct of the First World War.

Robin Savage, Rodney's son, features in The Lotus and the Wind, a novel about the Great Game. Emotionally scarred by the trauma of his experiences as a child during the Mutiny of 1857 Robin becomes a secret agent and ultimately vanishes into Afghanistan.

Bhowani Junction, set in 1946–47, seems intended as a counterpoint to "Nightrunners of Bengal", and the two are more closely related to each other than to the other books of the Savage series. The later book also takes place in the fictional Bhowani and its environs, and specific locations are seen again changed by the passage of the century (for example, the metalled road which plays a significant part in Nightrunners has been replaced by the railway which plays an important role in Junction). Moreover, one of the later book's protagonists is also called Rodney Savage (the great-grandson of the central character of Nightrunners) and in many ways seems the same character. He meets the descendants of Sumitra Devi in the same settings where his ancestor had met her.

In the final sequel, To the Coral Strand, this later Rodney Savage decides to stay on after the end of the British Raj and find a place for himself in the independent India.

== Awards and nominations ==
The novel was awarded the American Literary Guild's Book of the Month upon publication.

== Adaptation ==
Film rights were bought by the Rank Organisation. Roy Ward Baker was to direct from an Eric Ambler script and Kenneth More was going to star. Later on Betty Box and Ralph Thomas were to make it.

In the early 1960s John Wayne expressed interest in making the film for Samuel Bronston with Henry Hathaway. However the film was never made.
