= The Shakespeare Stealer =

Book by Gary Blackwood

- First edition
- Author: Gary Blackwood
- Language: English
- Series: The Shakespeare Stealer trilogy
- Genre: Historical fiction, young adult
- Published: 1998 (E. P. Dutton)
- Publication place: United States
- Media type: Hardcover; Paperback; Audio CD; cassette
- Pages: 208 pp (hardcover); 224 pp (paperback)
- Awards: 1998 School Library Journal Best Book of the Year; 1999 ALA Notable Children's Book; 1999 ALA Best Book for Young Adults
- ISBN: 0-525-45863-8
- Followed by: Shakespeare's Scribe

The Shakespeare Stealer is a 1998 historical fiction novel by Gary Blackwood. Taking place in Elizabethan-era England, it recounts the story of Widge, an orphan whose master sends him to steal Hamlet from The Lord Chamberlain's Men. It was an ALA Notable Children's Book in 1999. Blackwood published two sequels, Shakespeare's Scribe (2000) and Shakespeare's Spy (2003).

== Plot summary ==
In the late Elizabethan era, a fourteen-year-old orphan known only by his nickname, Widge, has learned shorthand, a method of rapid writing by means of abbreviations and symbols, from his previous master, a preacher who wants Widge to steal other preachers' sermons. Bass, his new master, wants to use Widge's skill to transcribe William Shakespeare's Hamlet before Shakespeare prints it. Widge sets off to London with Falconer, a ruthless man whom Bass assigns to ensure Widge succeeds. Hamlet's performance so enraptures Widge that he forgets part of his assignment, and when he returns for a second try, his notebook is stolen. Widge eventually settles into the acting troupe by posing as a hopeful player, and The Lord Chamberlain's Men accepts him. For the first time, Widge feels part of a real family. But it's hard for him knowing his duty is to not be a part of this family but to steal from them. Falconer continues to press Widge to steal the play, resulting in a constant cat and mouse chase between them. After Falconer, who turned out to be Bass in disguise, dies in a duel with The Lord Chamberlain's Men shareholder Robert Armin, Widge remains at The Globe to work toward his dream of being a player.

=== Characters ===
- Widge: An orphan who does not know his real name and was born around 1587. He is 14 in the story. Widge's previous master, Dr. Bright, taught him charactery, a shorthand language, to steal other preachers' sermons. His current master, Simon Bass, wants to use Widge's shorthand to acquire Shakespeare's Hamlet, which has not been printed for the public.
- Alexander "Sander" Cooke: Widge's closest friend when he starts his acting career at the Globe Theatre.
- Julia "Julian" Cogan: Widge's second-closest friend. The other players discover at the end that she poses as a boy, dreaming of becoming an actor, to be allowed on stage. After she is exposed, she works as a serving maid for a French wine merchant. By the end of the book, she sets sail for France, where women are allowed to act on stage.
- William Shakespeare: The playwright of the Lord Chamberlain's Men and the ghost in Hamlet; Widge knocks down white paint over his shoulder.
- Simon "Falconer" Bass: Widge's second master who wants him to steal Hamlet. Bass disguises himself as a messenger, Falconer. At the end, Richard Burbage (Mr. Armin) reveals Falconer is Bass, as the latter dies.
- Nick: An arrogant member the Lord Chamberlain's Men with Widge, Sander, and Julian. He does not like playing lower parts (i.e. women's roles) and often comes in drunk and late. A university student nearly kills him, but Widge saves his life. He accidentally pierces Julia's chest which leads to the discovery of her secret.

== Awards and nominations ==
- 1998 School Library Journal Best Book of the Year
- 1999 ALA Notable Children's Book
- 1999 ALA Best Book for Young Adults

== Sequels ==
The novel's popularity led to two sequels, Shakespeare's Scribe (2000) and Shakespeare's Spy (2003). The three novels were published together as a trilogy in a single, 784-page volume in 2004.
