= The Lotus and the Wind =

1953 novel by John Masters

- First edition
- Publisher: Michael Joseph
- Publication date: 1953

The Lotus and the Wind is a spy novel by John Masters published in 1953. It continues his saga of the Savage family, who are part of the British Raj in India, and is set against the backdrop of the Great Game, the period of tension between Britain and Russia in Central Asia during the late nineteenth century.

== Plot summary ==
The story is told through the viewpoints of Lieutenant Robin Savage and the innocent but determined Anne Hildreth, although Savage's viewpoint predominates later in the novel. It begins in 1879, when Britain and Afghanistan are engaged in the Second Anglo-Afghan War.

Anne Hildreth and Robin Savage have met and become attracted to each other before the narrative starts. Anne is the daughter of a Commissariat officer and is travelling with her parents to the military post at Peshawar in the North-West Frontier Province of India. En route, she witnesses the murder of an Afghan stranger. In his last moments, the murdered man writes the word "atlar" (horses) in his own blood.

Meanwhile, Robin is part of a military column in Afghanistan. He is the son of a distinguished soldier and has almost been forced to follow in his father's footsteps, but has no particular thirst for action. As the result of an accident, and a superior officer's bungling, he is accused of cowardice, and is also sent to Peshawar to await a military court of inquiry.

Life threatens to be awkward, but an acquaintance, Major Hayling, connects the murder witnessed by Anne with a trophy recovered from a dead tribesman by Robin in Afghanistan, a jezail with the words "atlar shimal" (horses, north) engraved on it. Realising that Robin's true passion is for solitude and empty spaces, Hayling recruits him into the Secret Service and sends him in disguise into Central Asia. Accompanied by a faithful Gurkha orderly, Robin sets out to discover the motive behind the murder and determine whether it is connected with the ambitions of Tsarist Russia. Before departing he marries Anne.

Ultimately returning to British India, Robin is reunited with his wife and infant children. He is decorated with the Distinguished Service Order in recognition of his achievements, and appears to have achieved conventional success. However, he disappears across the frontier again in pursuit of his semi-mystical goals. Anne is left to accept the unbridgeable divide between herself as the Lotus and Robin as the Wind.

== Relations to other books in the series ==
Robin is the son of Rodney Savage, the protagonist of Nightrunners of Bengal. Robin is around two years old when the Sepoy Mutiny occurs and his mother is murdered. Robin's son is Peter Savage, who features in Far, Far the Mountain Peak.
