= The Dying Sun =

1989 novel by Gary Blackwood

- First edition
- Author: Gary Blackwood
- Language: English
- Genre: Science fiction Young adult novel
- Publisher: Atheneum
- Publication date: March 1, 1989
- Publication place: United States
- Media type: Print
- Pages: 213
- ISBN: 0-689-31482-5

The Dying Sun is a science fiction novel by Gary Blackwood, published in 1989. Set in the mid-21st century, the book depicts a world where the sun's light is actually diminishing over time, cooling the Earth (as opposed to global warming), which causes a mass migration from the U.S. to Mexico. The large influx from the north causes overpopulation and a wave of violence in the south, and James and Robert, two friends, decide to go north to escape the crime-ridden south.

The novel is a 1990 Friends of American Writers Best Young Adult Novel.
