= The Year of the Hangman =

2002 novel by Gary Blackwood

- Gary Blackwood
- Cover artist: Tristan Elwell
- Language: English
- Genre: Alternate history
- Publisher: Dutton Children's Books
- Publication date: February 9, 2002
- Publication place: United States
- Media type: Print (hardback & paperback)
- Pages: 261
- ISBN: 0-525-46921-4
- OCLC: 54471321

The Year of the Hangman is a young adult alternate history novel written by Gary Blackwood and published in 2002. It was one of School Library Journal's Best Books of the Year list in 2002.

== Plot ==
Creighton Brown is an adolescent living in Britain in 1777. He often gets into trouble, much to the concern of his mother. One night, after drinking and gambling with his peers, Creighton is kidnapped by a group of men and taken aboard a boat. He cries out for help, but is struck in the face, and passes out.

Upon waking up, Creighton finds that the ship is already on the open ocean and heading for the Colonies. He is also informed that his mother is behind his kidnapping, having sent a letter to his uncle, requesting that Creighton be raised in the Colonies under his guidance so that he may become a better person.

The ship lands in Charles Town, where the crew meets Creighton's Uncle, Colonel Gower. He is not in his office, and they find the Colonel at the guard post, watching a soldier being whipped. When asked what the man was being punished for, Gower reveals that a copy of the Liberty Tree, a patriotic American newspaper run by the Sons of Liberty, was found in his possession. He also informs Creighton that he has a new post in Florida, and the ship departs again after a few days. While traveling, the ship is attacked by American rebels, led by Benedict Arnold. The rebels capture Gower, planning to use him as leverage in a prisoner exchange for captured American officers. Creighton pretends to be an indentured to avoid being ransomed, earning the sympathy and friendship of Peter, a private in the rebel army. In Creighton's final exchange with his uncle, he is instructed to spy on the Americans for information.

The captured ship changes its course to New Orleans, and Creighton is invited to live with Peter, who has been staying with Benjamin Franklin. Creighton meets Sophie Doucet, a housemaid who is working for Franklin, who runs a print shop behind the house.

Creighton visits Gower as he is being held in a makeshift prison, and Gower instructs Creighton to fetch him a gun. He reluctantly agrees, although he does not know how he will obtain it. During the day, Creighton assists Sophie and Franklin with setting lines of type for the printing press. When Franklin and Sophie leave the printing room one night, Creighton looks at the tray of type Franklin had been setting the night before and sees that they are prints for the Liberty Tree. Creighton secretly prints out a single sheet for himself and takes it with him, planning to share his newfound information with his uncle.

Peter enters the house carrying several pistols, announcing that Arnold has gotten into a duel. Franklin is able to talk both parties into resolving their issues, and the reluctantly settle their conflict. Creighton stumbles while walking back and falls to the ground. Peter rushes to help him and bends down to give him a hand. Creighton lodges out one of the pistols stuck to Peter's waistband, and it falls to the ground without him knowing. Creighton later retrieves it to give to his uncle, along with the information about the print shop.

Later that night, Creighton gives the pistol to Gower, which he uses to subdue the two guards in order to escape. Gower instructs Creighton to stay and continue spying on the Americans, but Creighton insists on leaving with his uncle. Frustrated, the Colonel, strikes Creighton in the head with the pistol, dazing him. When Creighton recovers, he finds that his uncle and the other British prisoners have left, and the guards will likely have recognized him. He runs back to Franklin's house and goes to sleep.

Creighton wakes up the next morning, still feeling dazed. Franklin informs him about the fact that the British prisoners have escaped and asks Creighton if he knows anything about it. Creighton confesses to helping them escape, but Franklin decides to keep his confession a secret and tells him to take the next few days off from work.

Peter takes Creighton to a café the next day to introduce him to some other Americans and play some cards. While discussing politics, the men talk about the “Indian Problem,” and how it is only a matter of time before New Orleans is attacked. It is revealed that Carolina, the British supplied the Cherokee Natives with muskets, and told them that the Americans were their enemy. One of the men mentions that they would have been caught off the guard and wiped out, but a British officer came to warn the colonists about the impending attack. It is mentioned that the officer shared the same surname as Creighton – Harry Brown. Creighton realizes that the officer being discussed was his father who was later captured and taken to be hanged in Florida. He becomes disillusioned from the fact that he had always been told his father died gloriously in battle, serving the British - not as (in Creighton's eyes) a hanged traitor.

Several days later, three men dressed in Native American breechcloths come to the print shop and set it on fire. Creighton manages to tackle one of the men to the ground but is forced to let him go in order to help Sophie and Franklin save the printing types. Part of the shop's roof collapses as Franklin enters the building again to retrieve more types and Creighton rushes into the building to try and save him. Franklin is knocked unconscious and Creighton blacks out shortly after. He comes to shortly after and is informed that Peter dragged both him and Franklin out of the burning shop. He also finds that they caught one of the culprits, who is revealed to be British and likely tied to Gower.

Arnold reveals a new plot to Creighton, Peter, and Franklin: he plans to feign defection to the British and feed them false information while spying on them. He and Creighton leave for Pensacola and meet Gower and the other escapees, among other loyalists. The Colonel initially has his doubts about Arnold and accuses him of being a spy. Enraged, Arnold challenges Gower to a duel, which he accepts. Gower attempts to tamper with Arnold's pistol prior to the fight by coating the gun's lock with resin to prevent ignition. However, the latter had brought a spare pistol, which he uses to fire a fatal shot at the Colonel. Creighton rushes to his uncle's side as he lets out his final words, “St. Marks. Number four.”

Arnold and Creighton leave the town and head to St. Marks, which is a British fort. Creighton speculates that George Washington may be held in cell number four, although Arnold doubts that is the case. Creighton gives him a stolen British corporal's uniform that he obtained on the way out of the town, which he dons in order to gain access into the fort's prison. They open cell number four, and find that the prisoner is not Washington, but Creighton's father. It is later revealed that Washington has already been hanged.

== Characters ==
- Creighton Brown: A British boy who is 15 gets in trouble with the law and who hates the British king. Hoping to cure him of his bad behavior, Creighton's mother sends him to the Colonies to live with his uncle. He is captured with Uncle Gower and Hale during the trip to the Colonies, but is released when he poses as an indentured servant. Creighton is then ordered to spy on his captors by Gower. He later gives himself up to Franklin by telling him his role in the escape of Col. Gower and Lt. Hale. He becomes Franklin's assistant in the print shop alongside Sophie, Franklin's French assistant. In the beginning of the book, Creighton is an arrogant Englishman who thought his only purpose in life was to play card games. In his adventures in the Colonies, he becomes aware of the many things in life besides games and ale. He faces challenges to figure out where his loyalties should lie.
- Benjamin Franklin: American Patriot who publishes The Liberty Tree, an underground rebel newspaper. Franklin takes Creighton in because he believes him to be loyal to the Patriots. He dies after a fire in the print shop started by British soldiers dressed as Native Americans.
- Benedict Arnold: American general who befriends Creighton. Arnold is a fighting man who favors violence over peaceful resolutions. He has a very bad temper and enjoys dueling. His leg was amputated in a battle.
- Peter: A giant who is in the rebel army and is a year older than Creighton. Because of his size, he is sometimes clumsy. Peter's character is based on Peter Francisco, a private in the American army during the Revolution who was sixteen and stood six and a third feet tall. He is Creighton's first true friend, aside from Lieutenant Hale.
- Sophie: A French housemaid, 14 or 15 years of age, works for Franklin. Sophie's family was killed by British soldiers, so she despises most British people. Throughout the book, Sophie works on Franklin's 13 virtues, where she focuses on one per week. She struggles the most with humility. She and Creighton have a seemingly flirty relationship but do not openly show affection to one another. She also works in Franklin's print shop, helping him print the underground newspaper.
- Colonel Gower: He is Creighton's Uncle. Gower is a cruel and a disagreeable man who is made the Lieutenant Governor of West Florida. He invades French Haiti and succeeds in capturing it. He also supervises the execution of George Washington at the end of the story. He abandons Creighton with Franklin and Sophie.
- Lieutenant Harvey Hale: A British Royal Marine officer who is instructed to escort Creighton to America. The two become friends. Hale is imprisoned with Gower. They eventually escape and Hale becomes Gower's assistant.
- Harry Brown: Creighton's father who is jailed for warning American colonists about a forthcoming British-ordered Native American assault, but Creighton, along with Peter and Hale, rescue him.
- General George Washington: The American General in the Revolutionary War, who later is hanged.

The whole book is a historical fiction.

== Reception ==
Publishers Weekly regarded the novel as "adventerous, if somewhat unrealistic."
