= The Deceivers (film) =

1988 film by Nicholas Meyer

- Theatrical poster
- Directed by: Nicholas Meyer
- Written by: Michael Hirst
- Based on: The Deceivers by John Masters
- Produced by: Ismail Merchant
- Starring: Pierce Brosnan; Shashi Kapoor; Saeed Jaffrey; Helena Michell; Keith Michell; David Robb; Tariq Yunus
- Cinematography: Walter Lassally
- Edited by: Richard Trevor
- Music by: John Scott
- Distributed by: Cinecom Pictures
- Release date: 2 September 1988
- Running time: 102 minutes
- Countries: United States; United Kingdom; India
- Language: English
- Budget: $5-6 million
- Box office: $346,297

Not to be confused with The Deceivers (1966).

The Deceivers is a 1988 adventure film directed by Nicholas Meyer, starring Pierce Brosnan, Shashi Kapoor and Saeed Jaffrey. The film is based on the 1952 John Masters novel of the same name regarding the murderous Thugs of India.

== Plot ==
The film takes place in India in 1825. The country is being ravaged by Thuggee, a Kali-worshiping cult also known as "Deceivers", who commit robbery and ritualistic murder. Captain William Savage, an honorable district administrator for the East India Company, is informed by his subjects in Madhya about the Thugs' murder raids, and appalled, he starts an investigation. He captures a Thug named Hussein and wins his cooperation, but Savage's bureaucratic commanding officer and father-in-law, Colonel Wilson, stubbornly adhering to Company protocol, dismisses his report and relieves him of his duty.

Chagrined but determined, Savage decides to disguise himself as an imprisoned native outlaw, Gopal the Weaver, and infiltrate the Thugee cult while aided by Hussein, with only his wife Sarah knowing about his plan. He is accepted, and after a period of training he is forced to participate in their raids. Receiving the consecrated sugar, implied to be LSD, after such a raid awakens in Savage a dark, ecstatic fascination for killing.

One day, however, Gopal appears, revealing himself as a fellow Thugg, and in order to avoid being exposed, Savage kills him. Savage also discovers that senior British officers know about the Thugs' activities but let them pass through their districts in exchange for a share of their ill-gotten plunder.

Fearing for Savage's sanity, Hussein flees to inform Sarah of her husband's situation; but Thuggee moles inside the Company overhear them and capture Hussein before he can return to Savage. While Savage's secret is exposed, the Thugs reveal to his surprise that they are willing to accept him as one of their own; but Savage is first instructed to kill Hussein. Instead taking one of the Thugs' children hostage, he forces his way out of the fortress, but Hussein is shot dead before they can get away. Savage flees into a field of reeds, where the Thugs encircle him; but before a former friend can strangle him, East India Company troops, alerted by Sarah's manservant, arrive and defeat the Thugs. Rehabilitated and promoted to Colonel, Savage receives the official task of eradicating the Thuggee cult throughout India, although he must also struggle with the mental and emotional scars of his time joining the Thugs and participating in their bloodthirsty ways have left on him.

== Cast ==
- Pierce Brosnan as William Savage
- Shashi Kapoor as Chandra Singh
- Saeed Jaffrey as Hussein
- Shanmukha Srinivas as Hira Lal
- Helena Michell as Sarah Wilson
- Keith Michell as Colonel Wilson
- David Robb as George Anglesmith
- Tariq Yunus as Feringea
- Jalal Agha as the Nawab
- Manmohan Krishna as Old Rajput
- Ramesh Ranga as Rajput's Son
- Gary Cady as Lt. Maunsell
- Salim Ghouse as Piroo
- Neena Gupta as Gopal's Wife/the Widow
- Kanwaljit Singh as Gopal
- Nayeem Hafizka as Sepoy
- Bijoya Jena as Harlot
- H.N. Kalla as The Nawab's Servant
- Rajesh Vivek as Priest
- Kammo as Official

== Production ==
=== Development ===
The film is based on John Masters' 1952 novel. In 1957 it was announced John Bryan would produce a film of the novel for the Rank Organization with Masters writing the screenplay. The film was not made. In 1974 Stanley Donen announced he had the rights and wanted to make "the kind of movie I've never made before – a big sprawling epic." He did not make it either.

Film rights passed to Merchant Ivory Productions. "It's completely different for us", said producer Ismail Merchant. "We're known for doing E.M. Forster and Henry James. Deceivers is in the same genre as Raiders of the Lost Ark. Which is certainly a switch." Merchant later said he made it to "keep the production company moving". In 1984 Michael White was reportedly working on the film.

Development took ten years. Original directors were Marek Kanievska and Stephen Frears. Then Merchant approached writer and director Nicholas Meyer—fresh off his work on Volunteers and Star Trek IV: The Voyage Home—through Meyer's agent about directing The Deceivers. Meyer reportedly agreed to a substantial pay cut in order to direct the film, remarking, "Hollywood is making films I have no interest in seeing, machined tooled, packaged, with a lot of numbers after their names. The studios don't just want home runs. They want grand slams. Anything less than $100 million is not interesting to them." "It's strictly action-adventure = a 'cavalry to the rescue' type film", said Meyer.

=== Casting ===
Christopher Reeve and Treat Williams were originally considered for the part of William Savage, but Meyer successfully lobbied to have an actual Englishman in the role. In his memoir The View from the Bridge, Meyer wrote, "'Here's a story about an Englishman who disguises himself as an Indian,' I reasoned. 'If you cast this actor, you will have an American disguising himself as an Englishman, disguising himself as an Indian. We will be lost in the stunt, even if he pulls it off, and not pay attention to the story and the things we want to take for granted, i.e., that it concerns an Englishman.'"

The part ultimately went to Pierce Brosnan, whom Meyer fondly described as "Errol Flynn—with talent." Brosnan had just missed the chance to play James Bond due to his commitments to Remington Steele. His casting was announced in April 1987. "I play an Englishman, a glorified accountant working for the East India Trading Co.", said Brosnan. "He discovers this cult and disguises himself as an Indian. He goes on the road with the Thugs, who kill people by strangulation."

=== Filming ===
Shooting took place over a four-month period in India, in Jaipur, Agra and Khajuraho, while post-production was completed in London. Filming started 21 September 1987.

Filming was marred with difficulties from the onset. According to Meyer, the production was subject to frequent disruption from the local Jaipur mafia for declining to make any dealings with their leader. Meyer wrote, "Scores of hooligans stormed through our sets while we were rolling; equipment was sabotaged or stolen; 'cultural' societies were founded for the sole purpose of suing us, alleging pornographic distortions of Indian culture."

The filmmakers were criticised by social and political groups who felt it distorted Hindu religion and culture. The producers argued it was "a pure and simple thriller".

At one point, Ismail Merchant and co-producer Tim Van Rellim were arrested for "obscenity and misrepresentation of Hindu culture." Among the allegations was that the production filmed a sati as one really happened. Merchant responded to the allegations with disgust, saying, "What happened was a mockery—people taking advantage of democratic principles in order to whip up a frenzy."

Associate producer Paul Bradley said the charge came from a politically well-connected Jaipur businessman who was unhappy at the depiction of Kali and the subplot about suttee. "The script has already been submitted to and passed by the Indian government", said Bradley. "Any film made in India, certainly by a foreign company, has to be vetted and passed by the Ministry of Information and Broadcasting." Bradley said the businessman and some film workers had been "pressuring the production company to employ them at exorbitant rates."

Despite the disruptions, Meyer spoke highly of his Indian production crew, stating, "One day when we needed our tulip crane for a big shot, I was flummoxed to learn that four of its bolts had been stolen, incapacitating a vital piece of equipment. I don't deal well with last minute alterations to The Plan, but my Indian crew managed to mill four new bolts by the time we were ready to roll."

== Reception ==
=== Box office ===
The Deceivers was a box office failure. The film earned only $346,297 in the North American market against an estimated $5–6 million budget.

=== Critical response ===
The Deceivers was released on 2 September 1988 and received mostly negative reviews from film critics. The film has a 33% rating on Rotten Tomatoes based on 6 reviews.

Roger Ebert of the Chicago Sun-Times gave the film a mediocre review and stated that, "Despite the film's claims to be based on fact, I didn't believe it for a moment. I did, however, enjoy it at various moments. Brosnan disappears so completely into the leading role that he hardly seems present in the movie, and the film's portrait of Victorian India is a triumph (the production was designed by the British master of period atmosphere, Tony Adams). It looks great even at its most incredible." Janet Maslin of The New York Times also thought negatively of the film, stating "The tinniness of Michael Hirst's screenplay (It's older than time and just as mysterious) hardly helps bring this material to life, any more than Mr. Brosnan's unconvincing and (despite several episodes in which he proves himself capable of violent killing) rather passive performance." Maslin then went on to say that, "In its own way, The Deceivers is oddly old-fashioned." Hal Hinson of The Washington Post called it "an adventure epic with a pretty measly sense of adventure." He added, "There are a few patches of exotic fun, like the opening murder scene, and there's a seductive campfire dance by a young boy that's creepy enough to send chills (though perhaps inadvertently). But for the most part all we react to is the squandering of a good idea."

Conversely, Jay Boyar of the Orlando Sentinel gave the film modest praise, saying it "casts quite a spell, combining supernatural overtones with scenes of shootings, stabbings and (especially) strangulations. Without being crude or exploitative it tells its story in a modest, old-fashioned way with no reliance on gratuitous gore."

== Home media ==
The Deceivers was released on DVD through The Criterion Collection. In 2021, it was released on Blu-ray by Cohen Media Group.

== See also ==
- List of historical drama films of Asia
