= Bhowani Junction =

Book by John Masters

- First edition cover
- Author: John Masters
- Publisher: Michael Joseph
- Media type: Hardcover

Bhowani Junction is a 1954 novel by British novelist John Masters, which was the basis of a 1956 film starring Ava Gardner and Stewart Granger. It is set amidst the turbulence of the British withdrawal from India. It is notable for its portrayal of the Eurasian (Anglo-Indian) community, who were caught in their loyalties between the departing British and the majority Indian population. The Anglo-Indian characters in the novel, like many members of their community, are closely involved with the Indian railway system.

== Plot summary ==
The book is set between 1946 and 1947, shortly before India gained independence from British rule. Victoria is an Anglo-Indian, the daughter of a railwayman. Patrick Taylor, also an Anglo-Indian, considers himself her boyfriend, but her feelings towards him have become ambivalent since her experience of British Army staff culture (see below). Taylor is represented as a clumsy and resentful personality, tormented by conflicting feelings of social inferiority and racial superiority. In vigorously defending herself from a British officer who is attempting to rape her, Victoria unintentionally kills him. She is persuaded not to report the matter by a subordinate of Patrick's, a Sikh, Ranjit, who hopes to marry her and whose family and friends help her to avoid detection.

Victoria had earlier decided to escape the claustrophobic atmosphere of the Anglo-Indian community by becoming a Women's Auxiliary Corps (India) officer at army headquarters. With the war's end and her return home, however, she is confronted with the problem of her identity all over again. She decides to get engaged to the gentle and serious Ranjit in an attempt to become assimilated in wider Indian society—since British rule is visibly on its way out—but then she realises that such a marriage would require her to give up her name (and, essentially, her identity).

She runs away from the Sikhs and literally into the arms of a veteran British officer, Rodney Savage (commander of a Gurkha battalion who "have come from the war, lots of wars"). Savage is, like John Masters, not only a professional soldier but also a member of a British family who have for generations served in India. Victoria originally dislikes Savage as hard and cruel but eventually becomes both his lover and his unofficial adjutant in the last hectic days of British rule in India. But in the end she realises that she cannot escape her origins, and—rejecting both the Indian man and the British one—chooses Patrick, an Anglo-Indian like herself. Rodney Savage recognises that he is losing out to his social and intellectual inferior, but realises that he is powerless to prevent it. Patrick for his part begins to realise that, in the new India, his children might have a chance of becoming anyone they want to, rather than having to stick to the Anglo-Indians' traditional role of working on the railways.

== Themes ==
The central theme of the novel, epitomised by Victoria's own dilemma between her competing suitors, is the conflicting pressures upon the mixed-race Anglo-Indian community as Independence approaches, not confident of "fitting in" either in a Britain most of them have never seen, or in an independent India.

Another important theme in the novel is the significance of the developing Cold War tensions on a post-independence India. The British are resigned to leaving the country, but are desperate to have an influence on India's future, specifically by averting the threat of a Communist takeover. The Royal Indian Navy Mutiny had been a stark reminder of Communist mutinies in the October Revolution and in post-World War I Germany.

Throughout the book the British are shown striving to support and sustain the Congress Party and its leader Mahatma Gandhi, who for so long they had been opposed to. In one passage the British character Rodney Savage reflects upon the irony of his being charged with protecting Gandhi against a terrorist assassination attempt.

According to Masters, writing in the Glossary to his earlier novel, Nightrunners of Bengal, Bhowani is an "imaginary town. To get a geographical bearing on the story it should be imagined to be about where Jhansi really is - 25.27 N., 78.33 E."

== Series ==
The book is one of a series of historical novels written by John Masters, set in India and involving several generations of the fictional Savage family. It has particular connections to Nightrunners of Bengal, the first novel Masters wrote in the series (though not the earliest in terms of its historical setting), which dealt with the Indian Rebellion of 1857. Both novels were set in Bhowani and its environs. Some locations, such as the Tree of the Silver Guru, appear in both novels (although the railway, which has a major role in Bhowani Junction, was in the earlier book a metalled road). In both books the protagonist is named Rodney Savage, and the WWII colonel is the direct descendant, almost a hundred years later, of the East India Company officer Rodney Savage from Nightrunners of Bengal.

Savage returns in a sequel, To the Coral Strand, where he undergoes a deep personal crisis which ends with his staying on in independent India rather than returning to Britain, and coming to terms with the new reality.

== Translations ==
- Danish: Bhowani-expressen. [198-]
- German: Knotenpunkt Bhowani; Deutsch von Susanna Rademacher. München: Goldmann, 1988 ISBN 3-442-09116-0
- Hebrew: Goralot Nigashim BeBhowani גורלות נפגשים בבוואני (See Hebrew cover)
