= Bhowani Junction (film) =

1956 film by George Cukor

- Theatrical film poster
- Directed by: George Cukor
- Written by: Sonya Levien; Ivan Moffat
- Based on: Bhowani Junction; 1954 novel by John Masters
- Produced by: Pandro S. Berman
- Starring: Ava Gardner; Stewart Granger; Bill Travers; Abraham Sofaer; Francis Matthews; Lionel Jeffries
- Cinematography: Freddie Young
- Edited by: George Boemler; Frank Clarke
- Music by: Miklós Rózsa
- Production company: Metro-Goldwyn-Mayer British Studios
- Distributed by: Metro-Goldwyn-Mayer
- Release dates: 29 October 1956 (UK); 1 May 1956 (USA)
- Running time: 110 minutes
- Country: United Kingdom
- Language: English
- Budget: $3,637,000
- Box office: $4,875,000

Bhowani Junction is a 1956 British adventure drama film based on the 1954 novel Bhowani Junction by John Masters. The film was directed by George Cukor and produced by Pandro S. Berman from a screenplay by Sonya Levien and Ivan Moffat.

The film stars Ava Gardner as Victoria Jones, an Anglo-Indian who has been serving in the British Army, and Stewart Granger as Colonel Rodney Savage, a British Indian Army officer. It also features Bill Travers, Abraham Sofaer, Francis Matthews, and Lionel Jeffries.

The film was shot in England at MGM-British Studios, Borehamwood, Hertfordshire, on the Longmoor Military Railway, and on location in Lahore, Pakistan.

== Plot ==
India, 1947: In the final days of British rule, Victoria Jones, the beautiful daughter of an Indian mother and an English train engineer, is serving in the British Army. She returns on leave after four years to her childhood home in the fictional town of Bhowani, north-western India, where supporters of Mahatma Gandhi are campaigning for Indian independence while communists, led by a revolutionary known as Davay, foment riot and sabotage.

She becomes reacquainted with a childhood sweetheart also of Anglo-Indian heritage, rail traffic superintendent Patrick Taylor, and also with Colonel Rodney Savage, a British army officer whose Indian battalion has been posted to Bhowani to maintain law and order as British rule ends. The protesters disrupt the rail service and Savage places Victoria on duty during the crisis. He disperses the protesters violently and Victoria does not approve of his methods. She begins seriously contemplating her identity and speculates that she should marry a man from India, although clearly Taylor is still in love with her and Savage has become infatuated with her.

Walking home alone one night, Victoria is attacked and nearly raped by Captain McDaniel, one of Savage's men, but in self-defence she strikes him on the head with a steel bar and kills him. Finding her, a Sikh co-worker of Taylor's, Ranjit Kasel, takes her to his home and offers her sanctuary, introducing her to his mother, the Sadani, and to a guest in their home, Ghanshyam, who offers to hide McDaniel's body after the Sadani worries that her son Ranjit will be accused of murdering the officer.

Davay's raids on the military infrastructure continue. He blows up a train, causing numerous deaths and injuries. When an army sentry is found murdered because he saw McDaniel and Victoria together just before she killed the officer, Victoria realizes that the man in Ranjit's home, Ghanshyam, is actually Davay and that the Sadani, once a notorious Indian resistance leader, has been harboring him. Victoria, influenced by her love of India, decides to become a Sikh alongside Ranjit when he recommits himself to the faith. However, during the ceremony, she is overwhelmed by guilt and begins replaying the comments of differing British and Indian voices in her head until it is too much for her and she suddenly flees.

Desperate, Victoria runs to her father and embraces him, telling him she has not become a Sikh. She begs to join him in the cab of his train as he travels to Gondwana, but he says he will be fired for breaking regulations. Just then, Savage appears saying he is also taking the train to negotiate another rifle company. Victoria's father presents a solution: if Savage orders Victoria to go, her father will have to submit. She travels in the cab but finds little relief as the heat overwhelms her. When they arrive, she separates from her father who has a further connection and looks for a seat to go back, before she stumbles on Savage. Savage sees her deteriorated state and asks her into his carriage where she showers and has drinks with him before confessing. In the morning, she realises what she has done, and expects Savage to think her guilty of murder. Instead, he promises to stand by her as long as she tells the truth. There is an inquest and Sadani is arrested. Victoria's case is determined self defence, and a ring is put around the city to try to find Davay before he flees. Victoria starts a relationship with Savage, wherein they visit an Indian restaurant together wearing Western clothing, and join in traditional Indian dances.

One night, Davay kidnaps Victoria, forcing her to exploit her connections as a train driver's daughter to force a train to stop long enough for Davay to climb aboard and drag Victoria with him. At a certain point in the journey, Davay leaves Victoria bound and gagged and jumps off with sticks of dynamite. Taylor hears from his staff that one of the trains stopped unexpectedly earlier that night and that a woman in a red dress and a man boarded. Fearing that Victoria has run away, Taylor goes first to her home only to find her missing, and then to Savage's. When the rivals realise she has been kidnapped, they race to stop the train they believe she is on. Savage and Taylor intercept the train after it goes through a tunnel, rescuing Victoria but finding Davay has gone into the tunnel with dynamite. Taylor recklessly advances into the tunnel to defuse the dynamite but is shot by Davay, who in turn is immediately shot and killed by Savage. Savage, cradling Taylor as he dies, watches the safe passage of the train. On board is Gandhi, whom Davay intended to assassinate, thereby inciting further hostilities and riots.

Savage's duty in India ends and he is summoned back to England, but his love for Victoria has become overwhelming. When she refuses to marry him and live in England, he proposes to marry but remain in India, and she accepts. Savage's superior offers to expedite his early release from military service in acknowledgement for his accomplishments.

== Cast ==
- Ava Gardner as Victoria Jones
- Stewart Granger as Lieutenant-Colonel Rodney Savage
- Bill Travers as Patrick Taylor
- Abraham Sofaer as Surabhai
- Francis Matthews as Ranjit Kasel
- Marne Maitland as Govindaswami
- Peter Illing as Ghanshyam aka Davay
- Edward Chapman as Thomas Jones
- Freda Jackson as the Sadani
- Lionel Jeffries as Captain Graham McDaniel
- Alan Tilvern as Ted Dunphy
- Yousaf D Hamdani as Assistant Director
- Neelo as a 15-year-old girl
- Zohra Mahmood, special appearance

== Differences from novel ==
The film, like the original novel, portrays the Anglo-Indian protagonist, Victoria Jones, as tugged in different directions by three suitors, Col. Rodney Savage, Ranjit Kasel and Patrick Taylor, each representing a different ethnic community: British, Indian (Sikh) and Anglo-Indian, respectively. The film-makers, however, changed the novel's ending and Victoria's fate. Whereas in the novel Victoria finally seeks her future with her fellow Anglo-Indian Patrick, a railway worker, the film-makers instead matched her at the end with the more obviously dashing British officer Rodney Savage, while consigning Patrick to a heroic death. (In the writer's own depiction, in the (unfilmed) sequel "To the Coral Strand", Rodney Savage does stay on in India after the end of British rule – but he does not marry Victoria, but rather goes through many upheavals and eventually finds love with an Indian woman.)

A related issue is that in the book, Victoria Jones is described as having a distinctly brown skin, being of partly Indian ancestry. When she wears a sari, she looks very much like an Indian girl, and much of the theme of the book concerns her attraction to the idea of being exactly that. For the same reason, she is well aware that if she were to marry Savage and go with him to England, she could expect to meet social rejections from his upper class milieu. All of these factors, which have a significant influence on the personality of Victoria as depicted in the book, were profoundly changed in the film by the choice of casting the white American actress Ava Gardner for the role.

== Production ==
The novel was the fourth by John Masters about India. MGM outbid two other studios to buy the film rights, paying more than $100,000. Ava Gardner and Stewart Granger were announced as leads almost immediately; Gardner had been on suspension at the studio for refusing to appear in Love Me or Leave Me.

George Cukor was assigned to direct. He travelled to India in October 1954 to research the movie. "I feel that for the first time India has been presented in this book as it really is, instead of the usual hokey-pokey atmosphere in which it is painted by most authors who write about it", he said.

The Indian government refused to cooperate with the production of the film.

The fictional location Bhowani Junction was in India, most probably Bhusawal. MGM had wanted to shoot the film in location in India; but, as the government of India insisted on script approval and imposed high taxes, MGM decided to film in Pakistan where the government was more welcoming.

As a result of the change in location to Pakistan, the script was altered to show Rodney Savage in command of the 1/13 Frontier Force Battalion (Coke's Rifles), which at that time of filming was part of the 7th (Golden Arrow) Division of the Pakistan Army, rather than in command of a Gurkha Battalion, the 1/13 Gorkha Rifles, as in the book. Pakistan army and police enthusiastically assisted in the making of the film. Several Pakistan army units of the 7 Golden Arrow Division including the 5th Battalion of 13th Frontier Force Rifles (now 10 Frontier Force Regiment), 5th Probyn's Horse, 1st Battalion of 13th Frontier Force Rifles (now 7 Frontier Force Regiment), participated in the making of the film. Colonel Savage in the film is shown wearing the Golden Arrow formation sign of the Pakistan 7 Division.

Also in the movie is the 4th Battalion (Wilde's) 13th Frontier Force Rifles, the band at the Lahore Railway Station with a deer as its mascot, while the troops taking part in the train accident were from the 4/13th. The battalion has a copy of the book and autographed photographs from both Ava Gardner and Stewart Granger.

The future Pakistani film star Neelo appeared in a small role as a reporter in a crowd scene. Neelo was introduced to Cukor by A. H. Rana, the film's production manager and casting assistant in Pakistan, who worked with the film's casting director, Harvey Woods. This was her first role in a movie.

== Box-office ==
The film earned $2,075,000 in North America and $2.8 million elsewhere, making a gross profit of $1,238,000.

It recorded admissions of 1,554,970 in France.

== See also ==
- List of British films of 1956
