= John Masters =

British army officer and novelist (1914–1983)

Lieutenant-Colonel John Masters DSO OBE
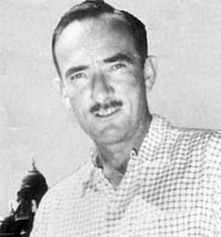
- Born: 26 October 1914; Calcutta, India
- Died: 7 May 1983 (aged 68); Santa Fe, New Mexico
- Education: Wellington College, Berkshire Royal Military College, Sandhurst Staff College, Quetta
- Occupations: Army officer and author
- Spouse: Barbara Phoebe Masters (1910–1998)
- Writing career
- Years active: 1933–1983
- Genres: Historical fiction Memoir
- Military career
- Allegiance: British India; United Kingdom
- Branch: British Indian Army; British Army
- Service years: 1933–1949
- Rank: Lieutenant colonel
- Awards: Distinguished Service Order

Lieutenant-Colonel John Masters, DSO, OBE (26 October 1914 – 7 May 1983) was a British army officer and novelist. During World War II, he served with the Chindits behind Axis lines in Burma, and became the GSO1 (chief staff officer) of the 19th Indian Infantry Division. Masters is principally known for his historical novels set in India notably Bhowani Junction, which was turned into a successful 1956 film. He also wrote a three-volume autobiography, which was positively received by critics.

== Life ==
Masters was the son of a lieutenant-colonel whose family had a long tradition of service in the British Indian Army. He was educated at Wellington College and the Royal Military College, Sandhurst. On graduating from Sandhurst in 1933, he was seconded to the Duke of Cornwall's Light Infantry (DCLI) for a year before applying to serve with the 4th Prince of Wales's Own Gurkha Rifles. He saw service on the North-West Frontier with the 2nd battalion of the regiment, and was rapidly given a variety of appointments within the battalion and the regimental depot.

In 1938, he organised a hunt for a leopard reported to be roaming the depot at Bakloh, only to find himself facing a full-grown tiger (which killed one of the Gurkhas acting as beaters). He later commented that whatever rank and decorations he was awarded, he was always known to the Gurkhas as "The Sahib who shot the Bakloh tiger".

In early 1939, he was appointed the Adjutant of the 2nd battalion of the 4th Gurkhas. During the Second World War his battalion was sent to Basra in Iraq, during the brief Anglo-Iraqi War. Masters subsequently served in Iraq, Syria, and Persia with the battalion, before being briefly seconded as a staff officer in a Line of Communications HQ. In early 1942, he attended the Indian Army's Staff College at Quetta. Here he met the wife of a fellow officer and they began an affair. Even though they later married, there was something of a scandal at the time.

After passing the Staff College, Masters next served as brigade major in the 114th Indian Infantry Brigade before being "poached" by Joe Lentaigne, another officer from the 4th Gurkhas, to be brigade major in the 111th Indian Infantry Brigade, a Chindit formation. From March 1944, the brigade served behind the Japanese lines in Burma. On the death of General Orde Wingate on 24 April, Lentaigne became the Chindit commander and Masters commanded the main body of the 111th Indian Infantry Brigade.

In May 1944, the brigade was ordered to hold a position code-named 'Blackpool' near Mogaung in northern Burma. The isolated position was attacked with great intensity for seventeen days and eventually the brigade was forced to withdraw. Masters felt obliged to order the medical orderlies to shoot 19 of his own men, casualties who had no hope of recovery or rescue. Masters later wrote about these events in the second volume of his autobiography, The Road Past Mandalay. In recognition of his "gallant and distinguished services in Burma", he was in October awarded the DSO.

After briefly commanding the 3rd battalion of his regiment, Masters subsequently became GSO1 (the Chief of Staff) of the 19th Indian Infantry Division, which was involved in the later stages of the Burma campaign. Near the end of the war he was offered command of an Indian airborne brigade but the Japanese surrender intervened. On 17 January 1946 he was awarded an OBE for his service in Burma.

After a spell as a staff officer in GHQ India in Delhi, he then served as an instructor at the British Army Staff College, Camberley. He left the army in 1948 with the rank of lieutenant-colonel, and moved to the United States, where he set up a business promoting walking tours in the Himalayas, one of his hobbies. The business was not a success and, to make ends meet, he decided to write of his experiences in the army. When his novels proved popular, he became a full-time writer.

In later life, Masters and his wife Barbara moved to Santa Fe, New Mexico. He died in 1983 from complications following heart surgery. His family and friends scattered his ashes from an aeroplane over a mountain trail he frequently hiked in. General Sir Michael Rose, the former UN commander in Bosnia, is a stepson of Masters.

== Personality ==
John Masters: A Regimented Life by John Clay was published by Michael Joseph in 1992. Now out of print, it is a sympathetic but not uncritical biography. According to Clay, Masters possessed a strong and sometimes domineering personality, and could be impatient with weakness or incompetence. He could also be extremely warmhearted and generous. His outgoing and boisterous personality flourished during his long residence in the United States. Masters was impatient with the literary establishment, which faulted his Indian novels as unsympathetic to Indians, and he was impatient with editors who wanted to remove the rough edges from his characters. Masters strove for accuracy and realism, resenting it when people mistook his characters' views as his own. He was extremely hard-working and meticulously well-organised, both as a soldier and a novelist. Clay speculates that Masters may have been driven to achieve by rumours that his family was not "pure" English, but Anglo-Indian or Eurasian. In 1962 Masters learned what he had apparently long suspected, that he did indeed have a distant Indian ancestor.

Clay's biography provides details that Masters omitted from the three volumes of autobiography he wrote: Bugles and a Tiger (1956); Road Past Mandalay (1961); and Pilgrim Son (1971). They are nevertheless extremely revealing. Bugles and a Tiger, details Masters's time at Sandhurst and service on India's northwest frontier on the eve of the Second World War. Road Past Mandalay deals mostly with the Burma campaign in the War, while Pilgrim Son chronicles his career as a writer.

== Literary works ==
=== History of the British in India ===
Apart from the autobiographical works, Masters is also known for his historical novels set in India. Seven of these portray members of successive generations of the Savage family serving in the British and Indian Armies in India, in an attempt to trace the history of the British in India through the life of one family. In chronological order of events (but not in order of publication) these novels are:

- Coromandel! (1955): a 17th-century English youth runs away to sea and ends up in India.
- The Deceivers (1952): an English officer goes undercover to root out the ritual murders of Thuggee.
- Nightrunners of Bengal (1951): a tale of the Indian Rebellion of 1857.
- The Lotus and the Wind (1953): a tale of The Great Game of British and Russian agents on the Northwest Frontier.
- Far, Far the Mountain Peak (1957): a tale of mountaineering and the First World War.
- The Ravi Lancers (1972): an offshoot of the series, set in the First World War, with one of the protagonists related to the Savages but having a different name.
- Bhowani Junction (1954): a romance set in a railway town at the time of Indian calls for independence and the Partition of India.
- To the Coral Strand (1962): the story of an ex-officer who refuses to go gracefully after Indian independence.
- The Himalayan Concerto (1976): another offshoot, as the protagonist isn't named Savage, a 1970s Cold War thriller about spying on a planned Chinese invasion of India.

One of Masters's last Indian novels, The Venus of Konpara, is notable for the fact that its principal characters are Indians. The Savage family play no role in the storyline, though it is hinted that a minor unidentified character is a family member. It is set in the nineteenth century during the British Raj, but explores the history of Indo-Aryan and Dravidian identities in the country.

Master's works have come under criticism for their depiction of Indian characters. However, both Nightrunners of Bengal and The Ravi Lancers contain sympathetic portrayals of Indian nationalists and portray irreconcilable tensions between British and Indian characters that mirror the conflicts inherent in British India in a manner comparable to E. M. Forster's A Passage to India. The descendant of the hero of the former novel (who is in practice manifestly the same character) experiences the partition of India with a resigned detachment and later undergoes a deep personal crisis which ends with his staying on in independent India rather than returning to Britain. One Indian novelist (Khushwant Singh) remarked that while Kipling understood India, Masters understood Indians.

=== Adaptations ===
The best-known film is probably Bhowani Junction (1956), which concerns the Partition of India and the Anglo-Indian community. It starred Ava Gardner. Four of the novels (the 2nd, 3rd, 4th & 6th in the series) were adapted for an 18-part serial in BBC Radio 4's Classic Serial slot, being broadcast from October 1984 to January 1985. The Venus of Konpara had also been dramatised for BBC Radio in 1973. The Deceivers was filmed in 1988 and starred Pierce Brosnan.

== Publications ==
=== Fiction ===
- Nightrunners of Bengal (1951)
- The Deceivers (1952)
- The Lotus and the Wind (1953)
- Bhowani Junction (1954)
- Coromandel! (1955)
- Far, Far the Mountain Peak (1957)
- Fandango Rock (1959)
- The Venus of Konpara (1960)
- To the Coral Strand (1962)
- Trial at Monomoy (1964)
- The Breaking Strain (1967)
- The Rock. An Epic (1970)
- The Ravi Lancers (1972)
- Thunder at Sunset (1974)
- The Field Marshal's Memoirs (1975)
- The Himalayan Concerto (1976)
- Now, God Be Thanked (1979)
- Heart of War (1980)
- By the Green of the Spring (1981)
- Man of War (1983) – US title High Command

=== Non-fiction ===
- The Compleat Indian Angler (1938) Country Life, London, with numerous ink drawings and paintings by the author.
- Bugles and a Tiger (1956)
- The Road Past Mandalay (1961)
- Fourteen Eighteen (1965)
- Casanova (1969)
- The Rock (1970) : a mix of fiction & history covering the tale of Gibraltar
- Pilgrim Son: A Personal Odyssey (1971)
