= The Deceivers (Masters novel) =

John Masters book

- First edition (publ. Michael Joseph)
- Author: John Masters
- Language: English
- Publication date: 1952

The Deceivers is a 1952 novel by John Masters on the Thuggee movement in India during the period of British rule during the 19th century. It was his second novel, following Nightrunners of Bengal.

== Synopsis ==
The story shows how British officer and colonial administrator William Savage learns of the thuggee cult, infiltrates their society, learns their ways and code of communication, and destroys them by capturing or killing their key leaders. During his travels with the thuggee, he almost falls prey to the cult's ways as he comes to experience the ecstasy of ritual killings. The story shows how complex the web was in terms of type and stature of people involved with the thuggee cult.

== Analysis ==
The Deceivers portrays the thuggee cult and corruption during Company rule in India. Historically, the East India Company was the world's first joint-stock company — chartered by Queen Elizabeth I of England in 1601.

The main character, William Savage, is an official of the East India Company and tax collector (or, as he would rather view himself, colonial administrator) of the fictional district of "Madhia". He is deeply committed to his duties, which he considers to lie with the people of his district, rather than tax extraction for the East India Company. He is fluent in four dialects and has a highly developed sense of honour. At the beginning of the story, he marries his fiancée Mary Wilson, the daughter of Colonel Wilson and twenty years his junior. In the course of the story, he discovers a mass grave, filled with the remains of travellers, all of whom were evidently strangled to death in ritualistic fashion, among them a recently killed British officer. This leads him to begin an investigation, in the course of which he arrests Hussein, who confesses to being a thug, or deceiver. Colonel Wilson arrives and is furious at the measures that Savage has taken to find those responsible for the mass murders. He refuses to believe Savage's story of the thuggee cult, blaming the murders on dacoits (bandits) instead. Savage then decides to become a thug and infiltrates their society with Hussein's help. His character is loosely based on William Sleeman, who historically started an extensive campaign involving profiling, intelligence, and executions.

== Relations with other books in the series ==
William is the father of Rodney Savage, the protagonist in Nightrunners of Bengal, set during the Indian Rebellion of 1857.

== Reception ==
"It offers color and violence in large gobs" said the Washington Post. The New York Times called it "an unfocused work that never comes to grips with its material".

== Adaptations ==
The novel was adapted for radio by the BBC in 1984.

Film rights were bought by John Davis of The Rank Organisation in the late 1950s. It was adapted in 1988 as the Merchant Ivory Productions film starring Shashi Kapoor, Pierce Brosnan, Bijaya Jena, Saeed Jaffrey, Rajesh Vivek, and Dalip Tahil.
