= The Ravi Lancers =

1972 novel by John Masters

- First edition cover
- Author: John Masters
- Publisher: Michael Joseph
- Publication date: October 27, 1972

The Ravi Lancers (1972) is a novel by British soldier and writer John Masters. It is part of his series of novels portraying the British Raj through the experiences of members of the Savage family.

Many of the incidents portrayed are based on the reminiscences of family-members and veterans in his Gurkha regiment.

== Plot summary ==
The story concerns an Indian cavalry regiment which is sent to France at the outbreak of the First World War. The Ravi Lancers is unusual in that it is part of the army of a semi-independent Hindu state (a Princely state) attached to British India. It accordingly follows different traditions than the regular regiments of the British Indian Army. These include a semi-feudal relationship between the Indian 'sowars' (cavalrymen) and their ruler. It also means that all officers except for the British regiment commander are Indians, which would not have been the case in a regular regiment at the time.

The book centers on the relationship between the regiment's British commander (a member of the Savage family, though with a different family name) and his Indian second-in-command Krishna Ram - heir to the throne of the state of Ravi. The young Indian prince, originally a naive admirer of the British Empire, increasingly discovers its shortcomings and develops his own awareness of being Indian. The British commanding officer Colonel Bateman, originally liberal minded, becomes a harsh and demanding martinet under the stress of trench warfare. The situation is further complicated by Krishna Ram's secret affair with Bateman's sister.

Finally the two divergent characters and their respective sets of values come to a shattering head-on clash in the midst of an assault on the German trenches. The climax involves what is effectively a mutiny when the regiment fighting as infantry is trapped by a German counter-attack. Led by Krishna Ram the surviving Indian soldiers are able to escape back to the British lines. The broken Bateman subsequently commits suicide at his estate in England, leaving Krishna Ram with a sense of guilt.

At the end Krishna Ram decides that he and his men will remain on active service in France, rather than returning to Ravi, because "we gave our word to serve" and out of a form of loyalty to the dead Bateman.
