= Gary Blackwood (author) =

American author

- Born: October 23, 1945 (age 81); Meadville, Pennsylvania, U.S.
- Writing career
- Genres: Children's fiction, historical fiction, science fiction
- Notable work: The Shakespeare Stealer

Gary Blackwood (born October 23, 1945) is an American author who is known for The Shakespeare Stealer trilogy.

== Biography ==
Born in Meadville, Pennsylvania on October 23, 1945, Blackwood sold his first story when he was nineteen.

In 1998, he published The Shakespeare Stealer, a historical fiction novel about an orphan, Widge, who is sent to steal Hamlet from William Shakespeare and The Lord Chamberlain's Men. After it won the 1999 ALA Best Book for Young Adults, Blackwood published two sequels, Shakespeare's Scribe (2000) and Shakespeare's Spy (2003).

Since then, he has continued writing historical fiction, such as Around the World in 100 Days (2010), which the Smithsonian named a 2010 Notable Book for Children and Kirkus Book Reviews one of 2010's Best Books for Teens. In 2017, he branched out into adult fiction with a Victorian mystery featuring Charles Frederick Field, Bucket’s List, and followed it with a sequel, Bucket’s Brigade (2019).

Blackwood is also a widely produced playwright. In 2001, the John F. Kennedy Center for the Performing Arts commissioned him to write a one-act play adaptation of The Shakespeare Stealer; two years later, Seattle Children's Theatre commissioned a full-length version that has since been staged by a number of other professional theatres, including Nashville Children's Theatre and Children's Theatre of Charlotte.

== Awards ==
- 1990 Friends of American Writers Best Young Adult Novel for The Dying Sun
- Ozark Creative Writers Conference 1st prize for Attack of the Mushroom People
- Missouri Scriptworks 1st prize for Dark Horse
- 1999 ALA Best Book for Young Adults for The Shakespeare Stealer
- 2010 Smithsonian's Notable Books for Children for Around the World in 100 Days
- 2010 Best Books for Teens by Kirkus Book Reviews for Around the World in 100 Days

== Works ==
- The Lion and the Unicorn (1983)
- Wild Timothy (1987)
- The Dying Sun (1989)
- Beyond the Door (1991)
- Time Masters (1995)
- The Shakespeare Stealer (1998)
- Moonshine (1999)
- Shakespeare's Scribe (2000)
- The Year of the Hangman (2002)
- Shakespeare's Spy (2003)
- Second Sight (2005)
- The Great Race: The Amazing Round-the-World Auto Race of 1908 (2008)
- Mysterious Messages: A History of Codes and Ciphers (2009)
- Around the World in 100 Days (2010)
- The Imposter (2012)
- Curiosity (2014)
- Bucket's List (2017)
- Bucket's Brigade (2019)
