= Edgar Speyer =

British-American financier and philanthropist (1862–1932)

Sir Edgar Speyer Bt
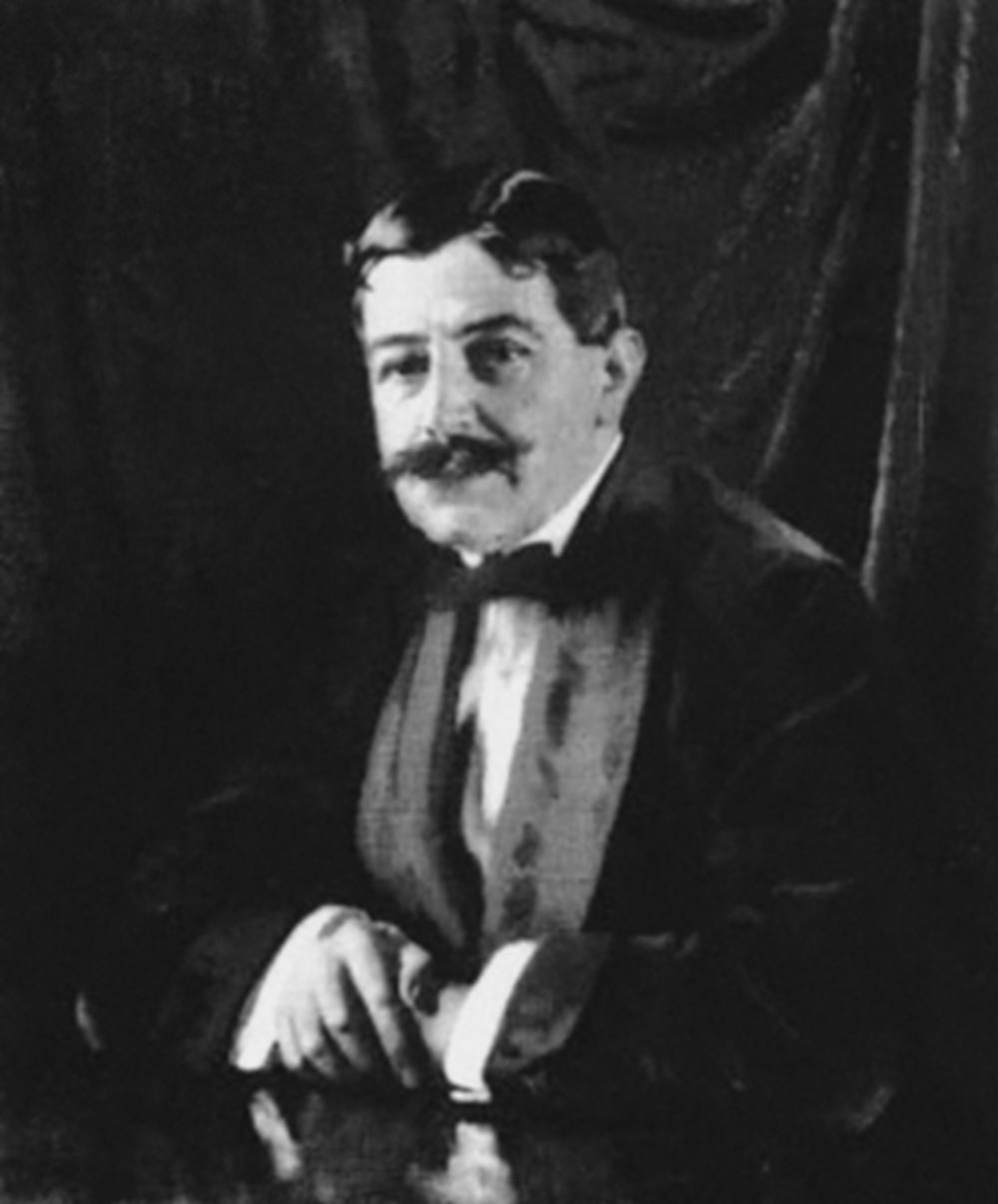
- Sir Edgar Speyer by Sir William Orpen, 1914
- Born: 7 September 1862; New York City, New York, United States
- Died: 16 February 1932 (aged 69); Berlin, Germany
- Occupations: Banker and philanthropist
- Spouse: Leonora von Stosch (m. 1902)
- Children: 3

Chairman of Underground Electric Railways Company of London
- In office 3 January 1906 – 18 May 1915
- Preceded by: Charles Yerkes
- Succeeded by: Lord George Hamilton

Sir Edgar Speyer, 1st Baronet (7 September 1862 – 16 February 1932) was an American-born financier and philanthropist. He became a British subject in 1892 and was chairman of Speyer Brothers, the British branch of the Speyer family's international finance house, and a partner in the German and American branches. He was chairman of the Underground Electric Railways Company of London (UERL, a forerunner of the London Underground) from 1906 to 1915, a period during which the company opened three underground railway lines, electrified a fourth and took over two more.

Speyer was a supporter of the musical arts and a friend of several leading composers, including Edward Elgar, Richard Strauss and Claude Debussy. He was chairman of the Classical Music Society for ten years, and he largely funded the Promenade Concerts between 1902 and 1914. His non-musical charitable activities included being honorary treasurer of the fund for Captain Scott's Antarctic expedition. For his philanthropy he was made a baronet in 1906 and a Privy Counsellor in 1909.

After the start of the World War I, he became the subject of anti-German attacks in the Press. In 1915, Speyer offered to resign from the Privy Council and to relinquish his baronetcy, but the Prime Minister turned down the offer. He resigned as chairman of the UERL and went to the United States.

In 1921, the British government investigated accusations that Speyer had traded with the enemy during the war, and had participated in other wartime conduct incompatible with his status as a British subject. Speyer denied the charges, but his naturalisation was revoked and he was struck off the list of members of the Privy Council.

== Life to 1914 ==
=== Family ===
Speyer was born on 7 September 1862 in New York City, the second son of German Jewish parents, Gustav Speyer and Sophia Speyer (née Rubino) from Frankfurt. His father was an international banker with businesses in Frankfurt, New York and London. Speyer was educated at the Realgymnasium in Frankfurt. On 10 February 1902, in Hamburg, Speyer married the American violinist Leonora von Stosch. (Note: The marriage took place at the English Church, Hamburg. It was later registered in London.) They had met at a concert held by Maude Valérie White at which Leonora performed. They had three daughters: Pamela, Leonora, and Vivien.

=== Financier ===
In 1884, Speyer became a partner in each of his father's businesses. He headed the Frankfurt office before taking control of the London office, Speyer Brothers, in 1887. His older brother, James, headed the New York company. The firm specialised in arbitrage with Europe and the United States, and the financing of railway projects. On 29 February 1892, Speyer became a naturalised British citizen.

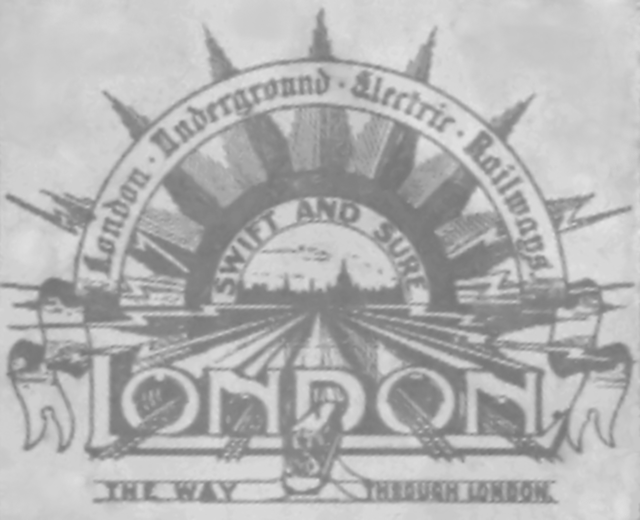
Logo of the Underground Electric Railways of London, 1907

Speyer Brothers' involvement in railway finance brought Speyer into contact with American Charles Yerkes in 1900. In Chicago, Yerkes had led the development of the city's urban transport system, and he went to London to capitalise on the emerging opportunities for new deep-level underground "tube" railways there. He and Speyer headed a consortium of international investors involved in the construction of three of London's underground railways and the electrification of a fourth. (Note: Between September 1900 and March 1902, the consortium purchased the Charing Cross, Euston and Hampstead Railway (CCE&HR), the Great Northern, Piccadilly and Brompton Railway (GNP&BR) and the Baker Street and Waterloo Railway (BS&WR) and the existing District Railway (DR).)

With Yerkes as chairman, the Underground Electric Railways Company of London (UERL) was established in 1902 with a capitalisation of £5 million, the majority of shares sold to overseas investors. (Note: The main investors in the consortium were Speyer Brothers, Speyer & Co. (the New York branch) and Yerkes' old bank, Old Colony Trust Company, Boston.) Further share issues followed, which, by 1903, raised a total of £18 million (£1.89 billion today) to be used across all of the UERL's projects. (Note: Like many of Yerkes' schemes in the United States, the structure of the UERL's finances was highly complex and involved the use of novel financial instruments linked to future earnings.) Yerkes died in December 1905, and Speyer took his place as chairman of the UERL. By 1907, the three new railways had opened and the electrification works had been completed. Despite the UERL's engineering success in carrying out the works in such a short time, the company was in a difficult financial position. The preliminary estimates of passenger numbers proved to be over optimistic and revenues were not covering operating costs. (Note: The UERL had predicted 50 million passengers for the CCE&HR, 35 million for the B&SWR and 60 million for the GNP&BR in their first year of operation but achieved 25, 20.5 and 26 million respectively. For the DR it had predicted an increase to 100 million passengers after electrification but achieved 55 million.)

After bailing out the company, (Note: Yerkes' novel financing had included the sale of £7 million of "profit sharing notes" which matured on 30 June 1908 although the UERL did not have the income to pay off the loans. "By the time the three tube lines had opened, the value of the £100 notes had fallen to a third of their sale price and Speyer had to bail out the company with his bank's money by paying off shareholders who were threatening to launch bankruptcy proceedings.") Speyer, with Managing Director Albert Stanley, struggled for a number of years to restore its finances. This was finally achieved with the purchase of the London General Omnibus Company in 1912, as its profits could be used to offset losses elsewhere in the group. (Note: By having a virtual monopoly of bus services, the London General Omnibus Company was able to make large profits and pay dividends far higher than the underground railways ever had. In 1911, the year before its take over by the UERL, the dividend had been 18 per cent.) In November 1912, Speyer further consolidated the UERL's control of London's underground railways when he negotiated the purchase of London's two other main tube railways, the City and South London Railway and the Central London Railway. (Note: The take-overs were completed on 1 January 1913.)

=== Philanthropist and patron ===
As head of the London arm of the family businesses, Speyer became wealthy. He owned a pair of neighbouring houses at 44 and 46 Grosvenor Street, Mayfair, that he had rebuilt as a single residence at the cost of £150,000 (equivalent to £15.3 million in 2025). The rebuilding work was carried out by Detmar Blow and Fernand Billery in 1910 and 1911; the architects gave the house a "Beaux-Arts" style portland stone façade and lavish interiors including 11 bedrooms and a large music room. Speyer also had a large country house built in 1908, in the fashionable Edwardian resort of Overstrand on the Norfolk coast.

The house was named "Sea Marge" (meaning land that borders the sea) and was designed in the Mock Tudor style, surrounded by gardens. To decorate his homes, Speyer collected works of art, furniture and decorative items from across Europe. He also commissioned art works, including his wife's portrait, painted by John Singer Sargent in 1907, (Note: Sargent also produced a drawing of Edgar Speyer which was reproduced in The Illustrated London News in 1909.) and his own portrait, painted by William Orpen, which was exhibited at the Royal Academy in 1914. (Note: Walter Sickert described Orpen's portrait of Speyer as an "admirable piece of work.")

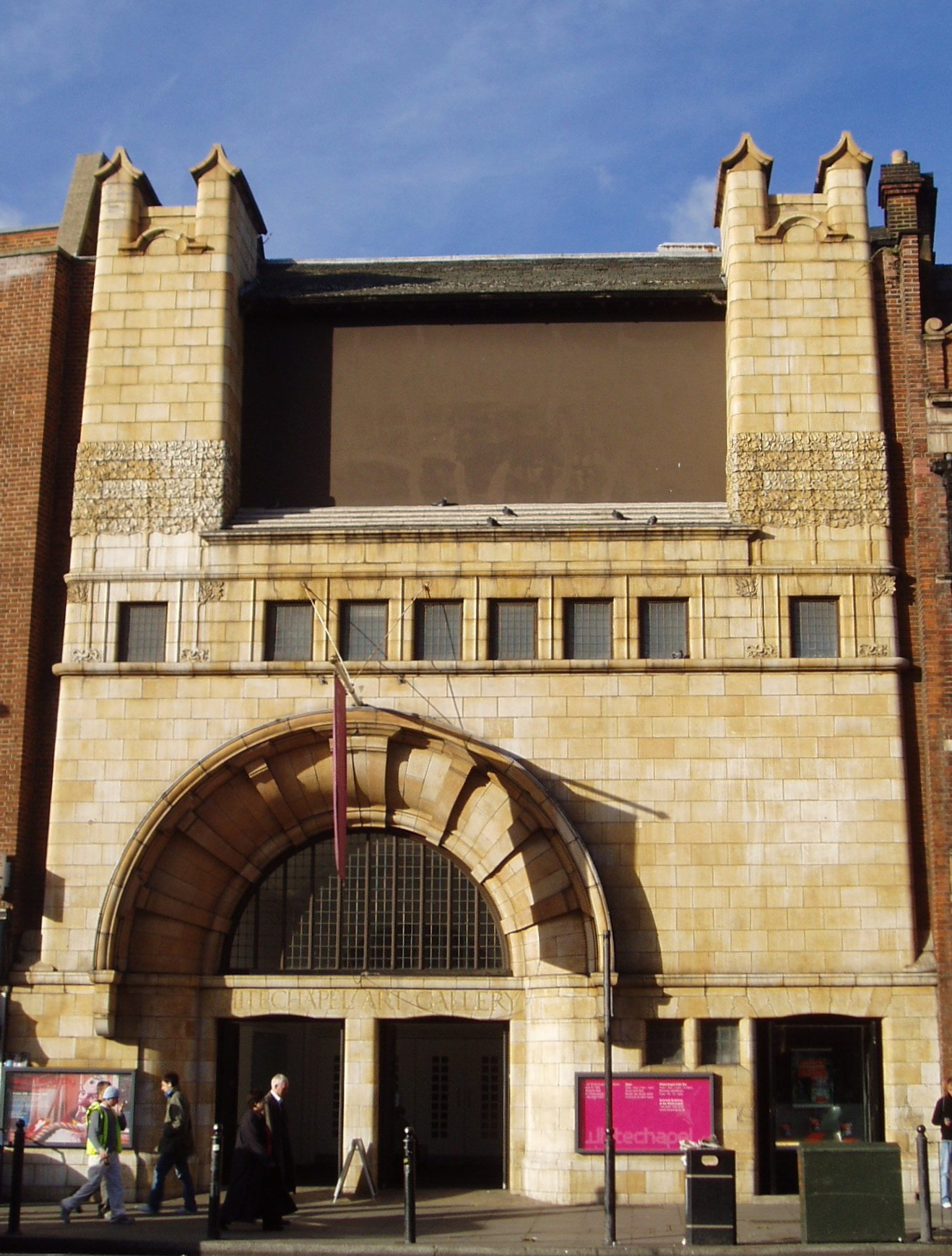
Whitechapel Art Gallery

Like his cousin Edward Speyer, Edgar was a music lover and patron of the arts, frequently holding concerts in his home. He was friends with composers Edward Elgar, Edvard Grieg, Richard Strauss, Claude Debussy and Percy Grainger, and with the German cellist and composer Hugo Becker. Speyer owned violins by Stradivarius and Giuseppe Guarneri, used by his wife in public and private performances. Following financial problems experienced by Robert Newman, Speyer held the position of chairman of the Queen's Hall Concert board from 1902 to 1914, paying £2,000 per year (equivalent to £210,000 in 2025) to underwrite the Promenade Concerts.

Speyer increased rehearsal time for the Queen's Hall Orchestra and was involved in the challenge to the deputy system then operating, stopping musicians from sending under-prepared substitutes to perform in their places. He was described by Bird as "the sole monetary force which kept the Queen's Hall Orchestra afloat". Speyer's control of the Queen's Hall enabled him to attract musicians and composers to perform modern new works at his concerts including Strauss, whom he brought to London to conduct the first English performance of A Hero's Life, and Arnold Schoenberg, whose Five Orchestral Pieces received its première in 1912. Becker dedicated Three Pieces for Cello with Piano Accompaniment to Speyer in recognition of their friendship, and Strauss dedicated his opera Salome to him.

Speyer also contributed £2,500 to the foundation of Whitechapel Art Gallery where he was a trustee for 15 years. He was chairman of the Nervous Diseases Research Fund, president of Poplar Hospital, and sat on the board of the King Edward's Hospital Fund, to which he donated £25,000 in 1902 (equivalent to £2.66 million in 2025). In December 1904, having read of the loss in a newspaper article, Speyer donated £5,700 to replace all of the funds lost by investors in the failure of a penny savings bank at Needham Market, Suffolk.

From 1909, Speyer was honorary treasurer of the fund raised to finance Robert Falcon Scott's 1910 British Antarctic Expedition to which he donated £1,000 of the £40,000 that was required. Speyer was prepared to take personal responsibility for a share of the liabilities of the expedition, although the money raised from public donations was sufficient. Mount Speyer in Antarctica is named in his honour. One of Scott's last letters was written to Speyer. It was found when Scott's body was recovered from his last camp after his unsuccessful return from the South Pole.

On 25 July 1906, Speyer was created a baronet. Politically, Speyer was a Liberal. He was a member of the Reform Club, and a friend of H. H. Asquith, by whose recommendation he was made a Privy Counsellor (PC) in 1909. (Note: Membership of the Privy Council was, largely, a titular honour only, requiring no action or attendance by the majority of counsellors. Council meetings were brief and only the few ministers responsible for the government business being discussed would attend.) In 1911, he was awarded the Order of the Crown, 2nd class by Kaiser Wilhelm II.

Escutcheon of the Speyer baronets

== Life after 1914 ==
=== Anti-German pressure ===
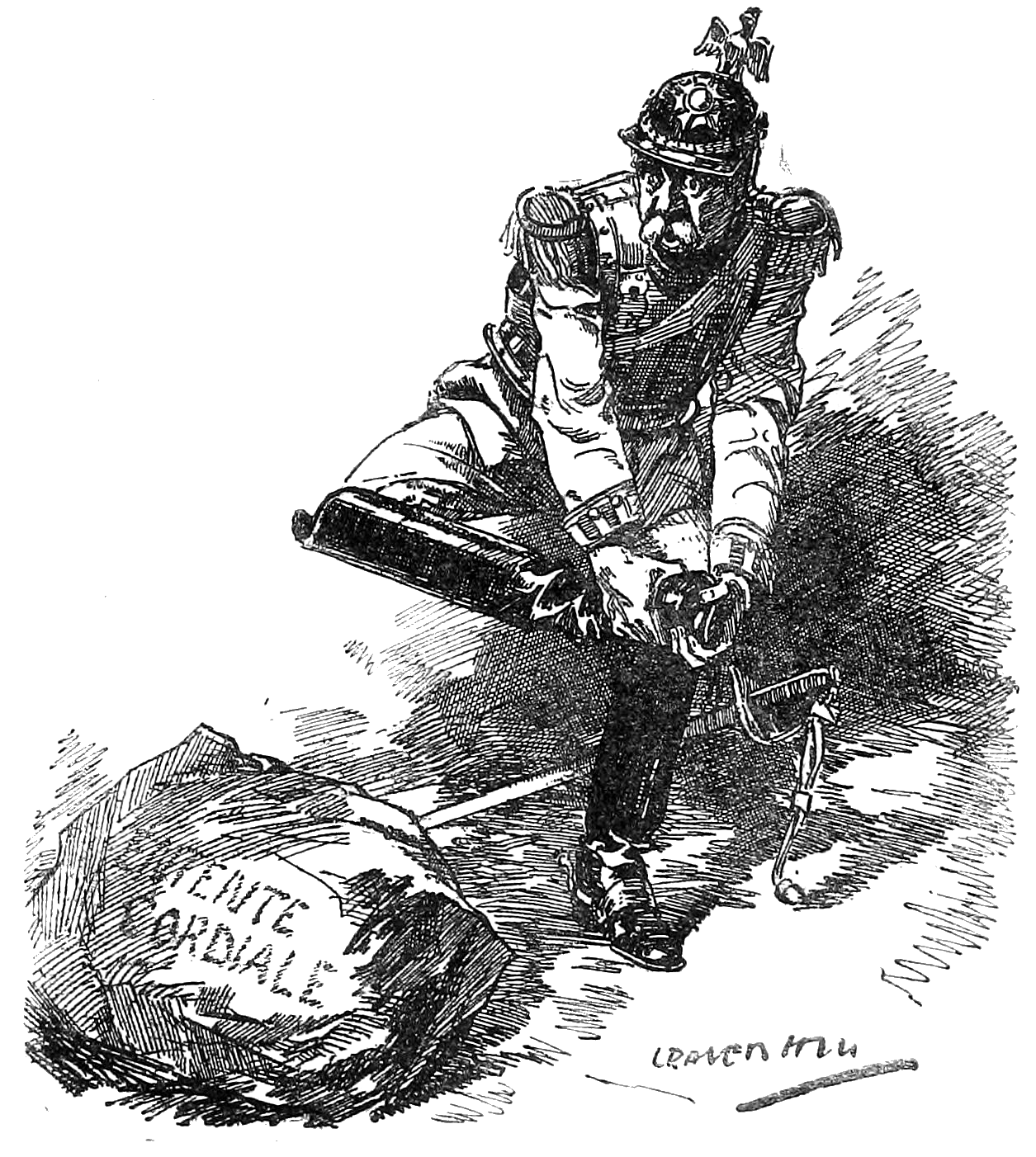
Solid, an anti-German cartoon regarding Germany's opposition to the Anglo-French entente, from Punch, 1911 GERMANY: "Donnerwetter! It's rock. I thought it was going to be paper."

The end of the 19th century and the first decade of the 20th century saw rising anti-German sentiment in Britain. As the naval arms race between Britain and Germany escalated, distrust of Germans and those of German origin was stirred-up by press warnings of the rising military threat from Germany. This was developed further in popular magazines such as the National Review and in novels such as Erskine Childers' The Riddle of the Sands and invasion novels such as William Le Queux's The Invasion of 1910.

Following the British declaration of war with Germany on 4 August 1914, Speyer resigned as a partner of the Frankfurt branch of the bank. After a Royal Proclamation on 11 September 1914 requiring British subjects to have no links with companies doing business with Germany, Speyer resigned as a partner of the American bank. Nonetheless, suspicions regarding Speyer's German parentage led to a hate campaign against him. Crowds gathered outside his home and jeered visitors.

Accusations of his disloyalty and treachery appeared in the Press, and he was accused of signalling to German submarines from his Norfolk house. Lady Speyer was ostracised from societies and associations of which she had formerly been a member. Speyer was asked to resign from the board of the Poplar Hospital due to threats of substantial reductions in donations if he remained. The couple were asked to remove their daughters from school as other parents were threatening to remove their children.

Speyer ignored a call to write one of the "loyalty letters" that Sir Arthur Pinero proposed be provided by prominent naturalised citizens of German origin. Instead, on 17 May 1915, Speyer wrote to Asquith, then Prime Minister, asking him to accept his resignation as a Privy Counsellor and to revoke his baronetcy, stating:

Nothing is harder to bear than a sense of injustice that finds no vent in expression.

For the last nine months I have kept silence and treated with disdain the charges of disloyalty and suggestions of treachery made against me in the Press and elsewhere. But I can keep silence no longer, for these charges and suggestion have now been repeated by public men who have not scrupled to use their position to inflame the overstrained feelings of the people.

I am not a man who can be driven or drummed by threats or abuse into an attitude of justification. But I consider it due to my honour as a loyal British subject and my personal dignity as a man to retire all my public positions.

I therefore write to ask you to accept my resignation as a Privy Councillor and to revoke my baronetcy.

He resigned as chairman of the UERL and from the boards of the King Edward's Hospital Fund, the Poplar Hospital and the Whitechapel Art Gallery.

It is doubtful whether it was possible for Speyer to resign from the Privy Council or as a baronet, there being no normal mechanism to do so, but the Prime Minister's response was supportive: "I have known you long, and well enough to estimate at their true value these baseless and malignant imputations upon your loyalty to the British Crown. The King is not prepared to take any step such as you suggest in regard to the marks of distinction which you have received in recognition of public services and philanthropic munificence." On 26 May 1915, Speyer and his family left for America.

In June 1915, Sir George Makgill, Secretary of the Anti-German Union, applied for permission from the High Court of Justice to issue quo warranto writs against Speyer and Sir Ernest Cassel, a German-born Privy Counsellor, requiring them to prove their right to hold that position. Makgill's claim was that the Act of Settlement 1701 prevented a person born outside Britain or its dominions from being a Privy Counsellor. In December 1915, Lord Chief Justice Lord Reading rejected the application on the grounds that the relevant sections of the Act of Settlement had been repealed by later legislation.

=== Revocation of naturalisation ===
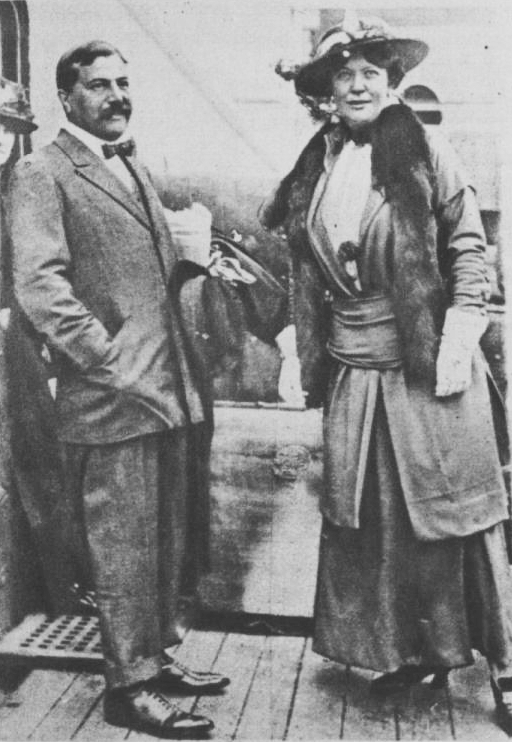
Sir Edgar and Lady Speyer, circa 1921

On 2 August 1918, in a House of Lords debate on the Denaturalisation Bill, the subject of Speyer's membership of the Privy Council was brought up by Lord Lincolnshire, who condemned "the brutal and insolent German manner in which Sir Edgar Speyer had resigned his dignity." Lord Curzon announced that the Home Office was examining his membership of the council. Speyer again offered the Prime Minister, then David Lloyd George, his resignation from the council, but received no response.

Following an investigation into Speyer's wartime conduct held in camera by the Home Office's Certificates of Naturalisation (Revocation) Committee, Speyer's naturalisation was revoked by an order dated 1 December 1921. On 13 December 1921 an order was issued by King George V for Speyer to be struck off the list of the Privy Council. The next person to be struck off the list was Elliot Morley in 2011, though others resigned in the intervening period.

The committee decided that Speyer had "shown himself by act and speech to be disaffected and disloyal to His Majesty; and [had]... unlawfully communicated with subjects of an enemy State and associated with a business which was to his knowledge carried on in such manner as to assist the enemy in such war." The committee's final opinion was "that the continuance of Sir Edgar Speyer's certificate is not conducive to the public good." Lady Speyer and the couple's children also lost their British nationality.

The report of the committee was published on 7 January 1922. The committee had considered nine issues in making its decision:

1. Retirement from Speyer & Co. – it was decided that Speyer had been slow and reluctant to resign as a partner of the American bank of which he was still in partnership with his German brother-in-law, Edward Beit von Speyer.
2. Association with enemy traffic – Speyer Brothers had continued to trade jointly with a Dutch firm, Teixeira de Mattos Brothers, between February and June 1915. As they were based in a neutral country, Teixeira had continued to trade with German businesses. The committee calculated that Speyer Brothers had made £1,000 by these trades, despite an inspection of the company's accounts showing no trade with Germany. It concluded that "Sir Edgar Speyer seems to have preferred his private financial interests to the prompt discharge of his duty to the State."
3. Communication with enemy subjects – Speyer had continued to correspond with his German brother-in-law throughout the war.
4. Evasion of the censorship – in his correspondence with his brother-in-law, Speyer had used various means including aliases and intermediaries to avoid the censor inspecting his letters.
5. Proposed return to Berlin – the contents of intercepted letters from Edward Beit von Speyer suggested that Speyer had proposed living in Germany after the war. Speyer denied this and stated that the meaning of the letters had been misconstrued in the absence of his side of the correspondence being before the committee.
6. Association with Muck – while living in America Speyer had become friendly with Karl Muck, the German conductor of the Boston Symphony Orchestra, who remained strongly pro-German even after the United States entered the war. Unknown to Speyer, who stated that their friendship was based on a shared love of music, Muck was suspected of being a German agent.
7. Association with Koren – in America, Speyer was friendly with John Koren, an American statistician who represented the United States on the International Prisons Commission. In 1916, Speyer had funded a fact-finding trip by Koren to Europe, during which Koren visited Germany and met Speyer's sister and friends. Although the committee considered the trip strange, they drew no inference of disloyalty from the events.
8. The Boston Journal – in April 1917, on the advice of John Koren, Speyer had provided a loan to The Boston Journal newspaper to prevent it from going out of business. The newspaper had printed some articles of a pro-German nature and the committee thought it imprudent but not disloyal of Speyer to have lent the money.
9. Paying money to enemy subjects – some of Speyer's friends had made claims at the Frankfurt bank for payment of sums due to them that were in the hands of Speyer in London. Speyer had authorised the payments, although this was not allowed by the wartime regulations. The committee commented that in similar circumstances it had shown leniency to others doing the same thing, and would not have attached great importance to the matter if it had stood alone.

On 7 January 1922, Speyer's partners published a letter supporting Speyer and rejecting the implications of his correspondence with his German relatives, stating that he was "incapable of any act of treachery against the country of his adoption". Two days later, Speyer also issued a statement responding to the report and rebutting the committee's interpretation of the facts. He stated that he had been advised of the committee's investigation in 1919 and, after considerable delay by the Home Office, had persuaded it to carry out an investigation in America into allegations made against his conduct there. These investigations, he stated, had demonstrated that the allegations were false, but, after he returned to Britain for the formal hearing in 1921, a further series of allegations were presented regarding his business transactions. Speyer stated that the issues involved were of a trivial nature and were similar to those encountered by other British banks which had traded without censure. He stated that "the whole thing is neither more nor less than the culmination of years of political persecution. The Home Secretary simply dared not give me the vindication to which I was entitled." He challenged the government to publish the evidence presented, and "to point to a strip of material evidence that would induce any fairminded man to support the monstrous conclusions of this report".

=== Final years ===
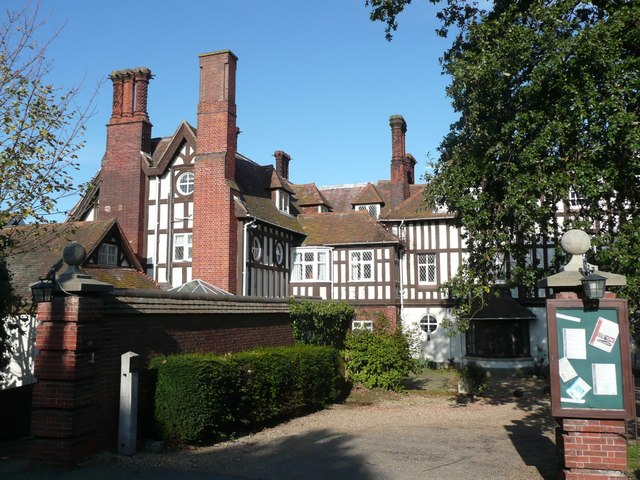
The Sea Marge, Overstrand

In January 1920, Speyer Brothers sold its shareholding in the UERL for approximately £1 million (£38.6 million today). A month later, Speyer put the Grosvenor Street house up for sale although it did not reach its reserve price at auction. On 1 April 1922, Speyer and his remaining partner in the London bank, Henry William Brown, dissolved Speyer Brothers. The Grosvenor Street house was eventually sold in early 1923 and became the American Women's club.

Speyer rejoined the surviving American and German branches of the family bank and continued to live in New York. In 1929, he lived in Washington Square. He died on 16 February 1932 in Berlin, after having travelled there for an operation on his nose. He was buried in Dahlem, Berlin. He had continued to hold his baronetcy, although it became extinct with his death as he had no male heirs.

After his death, Speyer's UK estate was assessed at £3,362 and his US estate at $245,287, equivalent to a net worth of approximately £203,000 and $5.9 million today.

== Legacy ==
Speyer's two principal legacies are the three deep-level tube lines of the London Underground, and the Promenade Concerts. The former might not have been built without the finance he raised with Yerkes, and would have struggled without his chairmanship. The latter may have failed in the early 20th century without his financial support. The tube lines now form the central sections of the Underground's Northern, Piccadilly and Bakerloo lines.

After Speyer's funding of the Promenade Concerts ended, they were taken over by music publishers Chappell & Co. and, in 1927, by the BBC. The characters of Sir Hermann and Lady Aline Gurtner in E. F. Benson's 1919 novel Robin Linnet were based on Sir Edgar and Lady Speyer. Leanne Langley suggests that the character of Appleton, a villainous stockbroker, in John Buchan's 1915 novel The Thirty-Nine Steps may have been based on Speyer.

After the American Women's club moved out, his London home served as the Japanese Embassy for some years and is now the offices of stockbrokers Killik & Co. It is a Grade II* listed building. The Sea Marge was sold after his death and became a hotel in 1935 and, between 1955 and 1990, a home for the elderly. It re-opened as a hotel in 1996 and is listed Grade II. After the Speyers returned to America, Leonora began writing poetry and won the Pulitzer Prize for Poetry in 1927. She died in 1956.

The Speyers' three daughters returned to Britain. Pamela Speyer married Count Hugo Moy in 1926, but was widowed shortly after when he was killed in a hunting accident. She died in Sussex in 1985. Leonora was married for less than a year and then lived with concert pianist Maria Donska and died in Kent in 1987. Vivien came to Britain as a member of the United States Women's Army Auxiliary Corps and died in Norwalk, Connecticut, in 2001.

== See also ==
- Joseph Jonas

== Notes and references ==
=== Bibliography ===
- Adams, Byron (2007). Edward Elgar and His World. Princeton University Press. ISBN 978-0-691-13446-8.
- Badsey-Ellis, Antony (2005) [2005]. London's Lost Tube Schemes. Capital Transport. ISBN 1-85414-293-3.
- Barker, Theo (2004). "Speyer, Sir Edgar, baronet (1862–1932)". Oxford Dictionary of National Biography (online ed.). Oxford University Press. doi:10.1093/ref:odnb/36215. (Subscription, Wikipedia Library access or UK public library membership required.)
- Benson, Edward Frederic (1932). As We Are: A Modern Revue. Longmans, Green & Co.
- Bird, John (1999) [1982]. Percy Grainger. Oxford University Press. ISBN 0-19-816652-4.
- Friedenwald, Herbert, ed. (1911). The American Jewish Yearbook (PDF). The Jewish Publication Society of America.
- Holmes, Colin (1991). "Immigrants and Refugees in Britain". In Mosse, Werner Eugen; Carlebach, Julius (eds.). Second Chance – Two Centuries of German-speaking Jews in the United Kingdom. Mohr Siebeck. ISBN 3-16-145741-2.
- Huxley, Leonard, ed. (1913). Scott's Last Expedition, Vol II. Smith, Elder & Co.
- Jacobs, Arthur (2004). "Wood, Sir Henry Joseph (1869–1944)". Oxford Dictionary of National Biography (online ed.). Oxford University Press. doi:10.1093/ref:odnb/37001. (Subscription, Wikipedia Library access or UK public library membership required.)
- Klein, Maury (2003). Rainbow's End: The Crash of 1929. Oxford University Press. ISBN 0-19-515801-6.
- Langley, Leanne (2007). Banker, Baron, Saviour, 'Spy': Sir Edgar Speyer and the Queen's Hall Proms, 1902–14 (PDF). Archived from the original (PDF) on 2 April 2012.
- Lentin, Antony (2013). Banker, Traitor, Scapegoat, Spy? The Troublesome Case of Sir Edgar Speyer. Haus. ISBN 978-1-908323-11-8.
- Liebmann, George W. (2015). The Fall of the House of Speyer: The Story of a Banking Dynasty. I B Tauris. ISBN 978-1-78453-176-8.
- Northrop Moore, Jerrold (1984) [1984]. Edward Elgar. A Creative Life. Oxford University Press. ISBN 0-19-315447-1.
- Rintoul, M. C. (1993). Dictionary of Real People and Places in Fiction. Taylor & Francis. ISBN 0-415-05999-2.
- Sheppard, F. H. W. (1980). Grosvenor Street: South Side, Survey of London: volume 40: The Grosvenor Estate in Mayfair, Part 2 (The Buildings). English Heritage.
- Turley, Charles (1914). The Voyages of Captain Scott. Smith, Elder & Co.
- Turner, P. M. (September 1904). "The House and Collection of Mr. Edgar Speyer". The Burlington Magazine for Connoisseurs. 5 (18). London: The Burlington Magazine Publications Limited: 544–555.
- Walker-Smith, Derek (1934). Lord Reading and His Cases – The Study of a Great Career. The Macmillan Company. ISBN 978-1-4067-3197-2.
- Wolmar, Christian (2005) [2004]. The Subterranean Railway: How the London Underground Was Built and How It Changed the City Forever. Atlantic Books. ISBN 1-84354-023-1.

Business positions
Preceded by Charles Yerkes	Chairman, Underground Electric Railways Company of London; 1906–1915	Succeeded by Lord George Hamilton
Baronetage of the United Kingdom
New creation	Baronet (of Grosvenor Street); 1906–1932	Extinct
Preceded by Schuster baronets	Speyer baronets of Grosvenor Street; 25 July 1906	Succeeded by Lucas-Tooth baronets
