= Glyn Hughes (British Army officer) =

British Army officer (1892–1973)

Glyn Hughes CBE
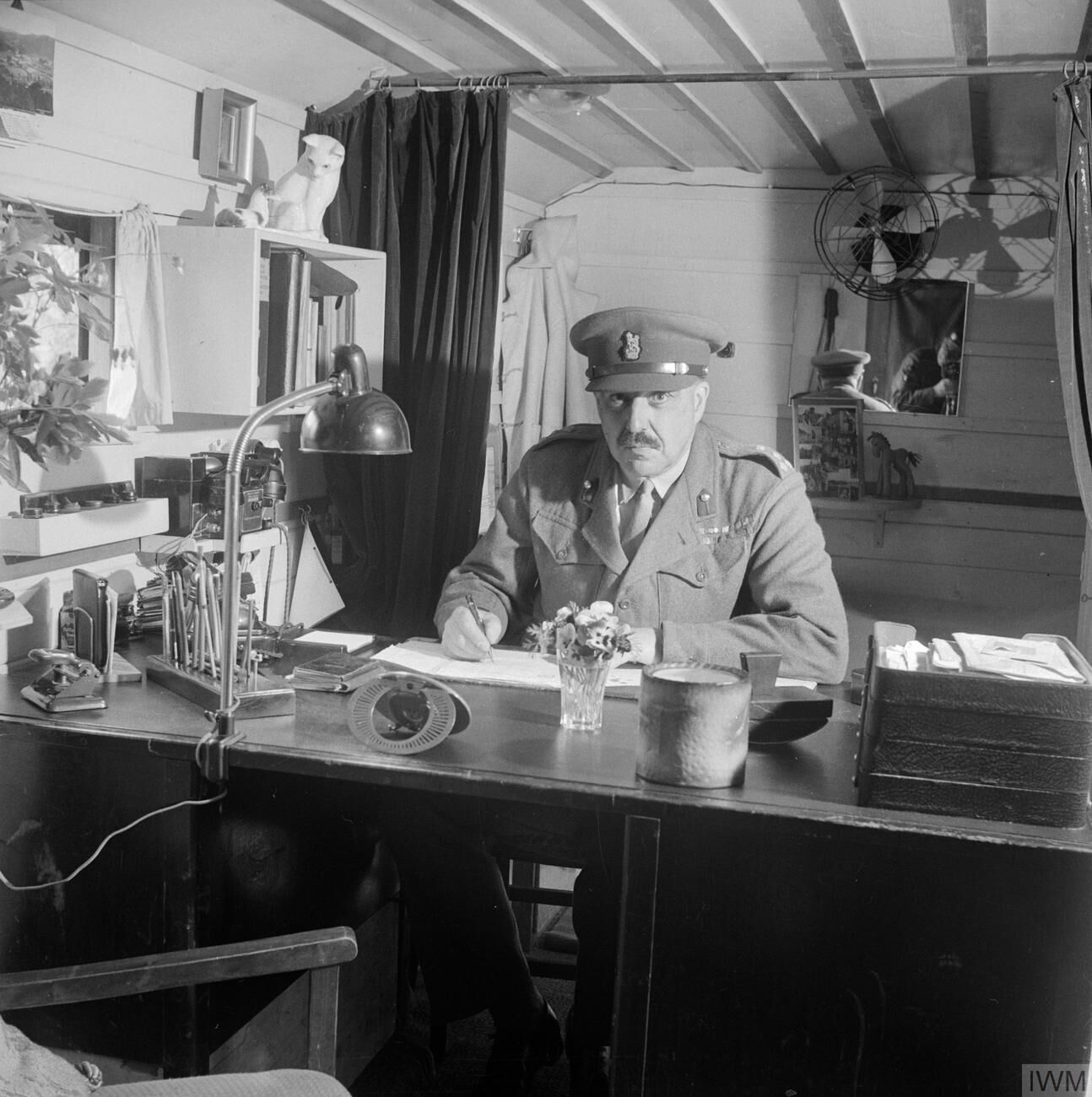
- Brigadier Glyn Hughes at Bergen-Belsen, 1945
- Born: 25 July 1892; Ventersburg, Orange Free State (now South Africa)
- Died: 24 November 1973 (aged 81); Edinburgh, Scotland
- Military career
- Allegiance: United Kingdom
- Branch: British Army
- Service years: 1915–1947
- Rank: Brigadier
- Nickname: "Hughie"
- Service number: 111060
- Units: Wiltshire Regiment; Grenadier Guards
- Commands: Royal Army Medical Corps
- Conflicts: First World War; Second World War
- Awards: Commander of the Order of the British Empire; Distinguished Service Order & Two Bars; Military Cross; Order of St. John of Jerusalem; Mentioned in Despatches; Croix de guerre (France); Legion of Merit (United States)

Hugh Llewellyn Glyn Hughes, CBE, DSO**, MC, MRCS (25 July 1892 – 24 November 1973) was a senior British military officer in the Royal Army Medical Corps and later a medical administrator, educationalist and sports administrator. Hughes served in both the First and Second World Wars and is notable for his role in the care and rehabilitation of the victims of Bergen-Belsen concentration camp.

== Early life ==
Hughes was born in Ventersburg, Orange Free State on 24 July 1892 and spent the first two years of his life in South Africa, after his father emigrated to take a medical post. When Hughes was two his father died from an infection caused during an operation. Hughes and his mother returned to Britain, but at the age of seven Hughes was diagnosed with having curvature of the spine and at one time was confined to a spinal carriage. He was educated at Epsom College and, with his health issues behind him, he threw himself into school life. After leaving school, like his father before him, Hughes decided to become a medical practitioner, and was accepted to University College Hospital in London.

== Military career ==
=== First World War ===
After graduating from college in 1915, Hughes was commissioned into the British Army and served in the First World War as a medical officer. He was attached to the Wiltshire Regiment from 1915 to 1918, and to the Grenadier Guards from 1918 to 1919. He was awarded the Distinguished Service Order (DSO) on 25 August 1916 while a subaltern and, within four months, had been awarded a Bar to his DSO. His DSO citation reads:

Temp. Lt. Hugh Llewellyn Glyn Hughes RAMC. For conspicuous gallantry and devotion to duty during operations. He went out in broad daylight, under heavy fire, and bandaged seven wounded men in the open, lying out in an exposed spot for one and a half hours. At nightfall he led a party through a heavy barrage and brought the seven men back

His Bar citation is as follows:

Temp. Capt. Hugh Llewellyn Glyn Hughes DSO RAMC. For conspicuous gallantry and devotion to duty during operations. On four separate days he showed an utter contempt for danger when collecting and tending the wounded under heavy shell fire.

Hughes was heavily decorated during the First World War, and before its end he was awarded the Military Cross, the French Croix de guerre avec palme and was several times Mentioned in Despatches; he was also seriously wounded on three separate occasions. With the end of the war, Hughes returned to his medical duties, becoming a General Practitioner in Chagford, but remained in the army reserve at the rank of lieutenant.

=== Second World War ===
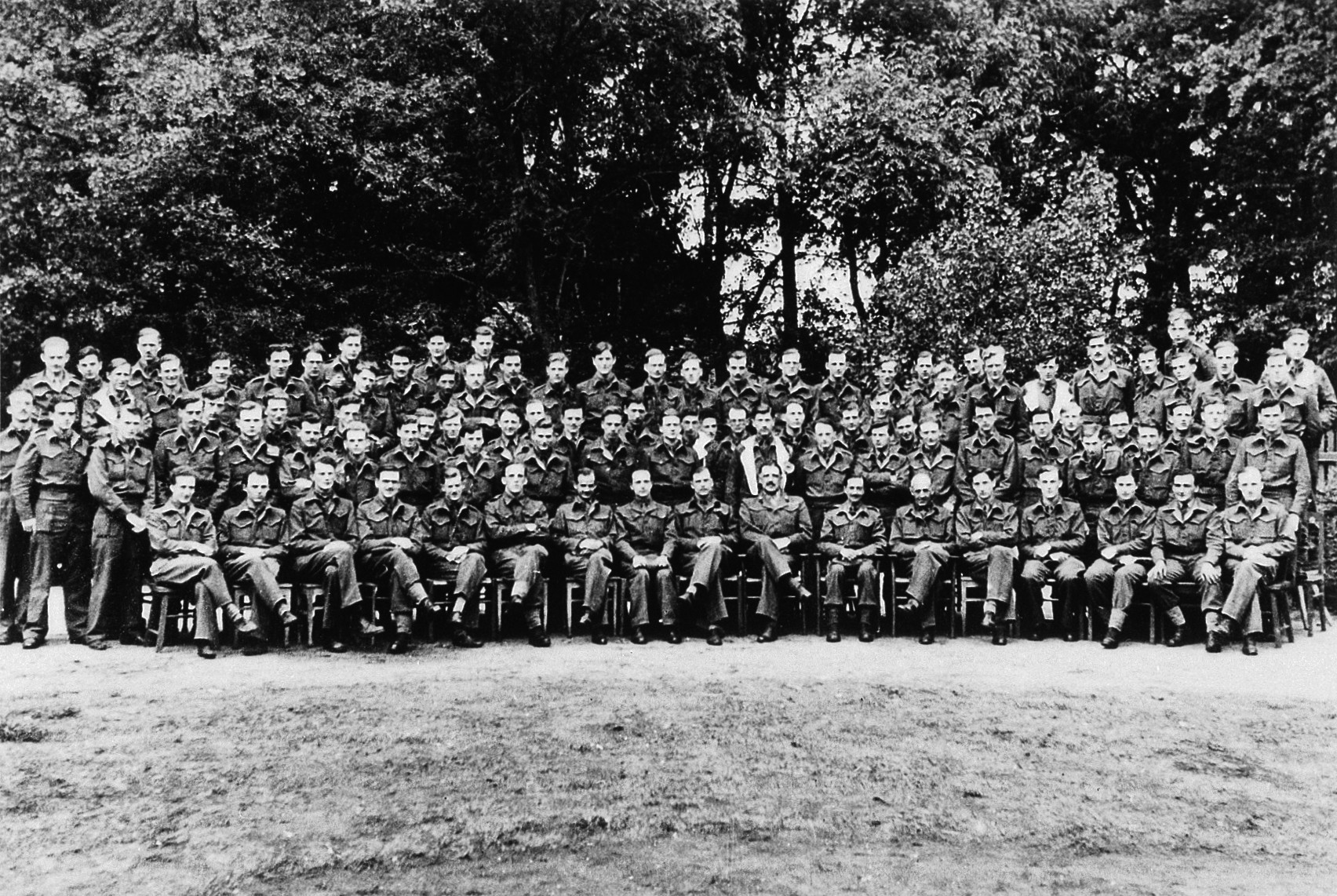
Group photo of London Medical students who went to Belsen Wellcome – Hughes is in the centre of the front row

With the outbreak of the Second World War, Hughes was mobilised in 1939 and sent to France with the 5th Infantry Division. After the fall of France in June 1940, he spent his time training medical units for active service. By 1944 he had been promoted to brigadier and became Deputy Director Medical Services to the VIII Corps and the Second Army, and became the Chief Medical Officer in the advance, serving in this capacity throughout the North West Europe Campaign, including Operation Overlord.

On 15 April 1945, while attached to the 11th Armoured Division, Hughes became the first Allied Medical Officer to enter the concentration camp at Bergen-Belsen. Hughes took control of the camp and the 4,600 German and Hungarian soldiers placed at his command by the German authorities. Hughes' two main issues were the control of disease, after an outbreak of typhus, and the distribution of food. To aid with the general health of the camp victims, Hughes took control of the local hospital, removing the German patients to treat his new charges. The hospital was later renamed the Glyn Hughes Hospital in his honour. The distribution of rations was a far greater problem, and with only 120 British troops, the German soldiers were ordered to assist in the control of food in the camp. On the first night of the liberation a riot broke out among the inmates over limited rations and the German guards reacted by shooting and killing several of them. To ensure this situation did not repeat itself, Hughes threatened to execute a German soldier for every inmate killed. In September 1945, Hughes was one of the main witnesses for the prosecution in the Belsen Trial. For his actions at Belsen, Hughes was awarded the Order of St. John of Jerusalem and the United States Legion of Merit. He also received a second Bar to his DSO, for actions during the attempted relief of Arnhem from the south, earlier in the campaign, where as the most senior surviving officer, he took command of the tanks. In 1945 he was appointed a Commander of the Order of the British Empire.

With the end of the war, Hughes took up the position as Commandant of the RAMC depot in Crookham, with his final military post being an Inspector of Training.

== Later career ==
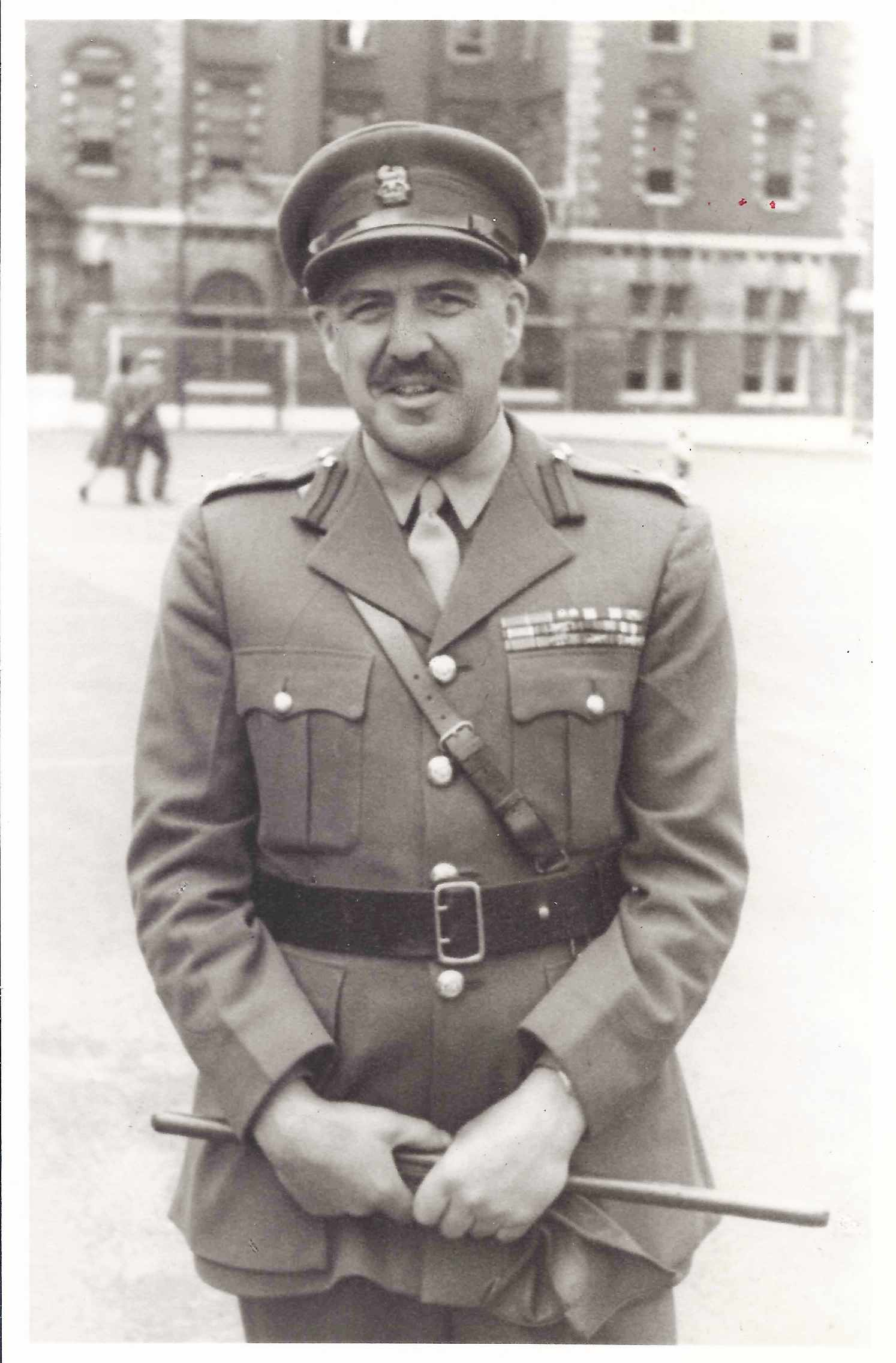
Brigadier Hughes post-war

After leaving the forces in 1947, Hughes took up the first of his senior medical administrative posts, when he became the senior medical officer of the South East Metropolitan Hospital Board. In this position he played a prominent role in the administration of the newly created National Health Service, and again in 1952 with the formation of the Royal College of General Practitioners. He held several titles before his retirement, including Honorary Physician to the Queen, President of the Harveian Society and Medical Officer to the British Red Cross Society. He was the director of a general practice in South East London until his retirement in 1968.

Hughes was the subject of the British television series This Is Your Life in 1959 when he was surprised by Eamonn Andrews at the BBC Television Theatre.

== Rugby career ==
Outside his professional career, Hughes was a very keen sportsman, with his main interest being rugby union. At Epsom College he was captain of the rugby XV, and as an adult played club rugby for Blackheath F.C. During the 1912/13 season he was selected to play for invitational touring team the Barbarians, an association which would continue until his death. His first match for the Barbarians was during the 1913 tour in the traditional tour encounter with Penarth, before playing against Cardiff and Swansea. He played a total of 20 games for the Barbarians over nine tours, scoring a try against Newport in 1925 and captained the team for three matches between 1919 and 1920.

Hughes played for multiple rugby teams, most notably United Hospitals of which the University College Hospital was connected. He also represented several county teams, including Devon, Middlesex, London Counties and captained Exeter. After retiring from playing rugby, Hughes continued his association with rugby as a rugby administrator and referee. In 1936, like Tommy Vile before him in the 1927 tour, Hughes was chosen to act as referee in the Great Britain tour of Argentina. He wore his Barbarian jersey on the field during the tour.

When in 1928, Emile de Lissa was made vice-president of the Barbarians, Hughes was elected as Treasurer, and when Jack Haigh-Smith died suddenly in 1955, Hughes was made President of the club. Hughes remained President until his death in 1973, and held the post when the Barbarians famously beat the 1973 touring "All Blacks" at the Cardiff Arms Park.

It was Hughes who blocked John Taylor from becoming a Barbarian in the 1973 match, branding him a "Communist" for refusing to face the South African rugby team for Wales during apartheid.

Hughes died on 24 November 1973 in Edinburgh, three days after watching an international rugby game between Scotland and Argentina.

== Bibliography ==
- Starmer-Smith, Nigel (1977). The Barbarians. Macdonald & Jane's Publishers. ISBN 0-86007-552-4.
