= Killik =

Killik may refer to:

- Killik, Alaca
- Killik, Döşemealtı, a village in Antalya, Turkey
- Killik & Co, a British retail investment company
  - Killik Cup, a rugby union trophy sponsored by Killik & Co
- Killik Formation, a triassic fossiliferous stratigraphic unit in Turkey
- Killik River, a river in Alaska
- Killik, an insectoid species in Star Wars novel the Dark Nest trilogy
- Kilik Pass, an alternative spelling.

== See also ==
- Kilik (disambiguation)
