= IPPF =

IPPF can refer to

- International Penal and Penitentiary Foundation
- International Planned Parenthood Federation
- International Professional Practices Framework from the Institute of Internal Auditors
