= Sea Marge Hotel, Overstrand =

Sea Marge Hotel
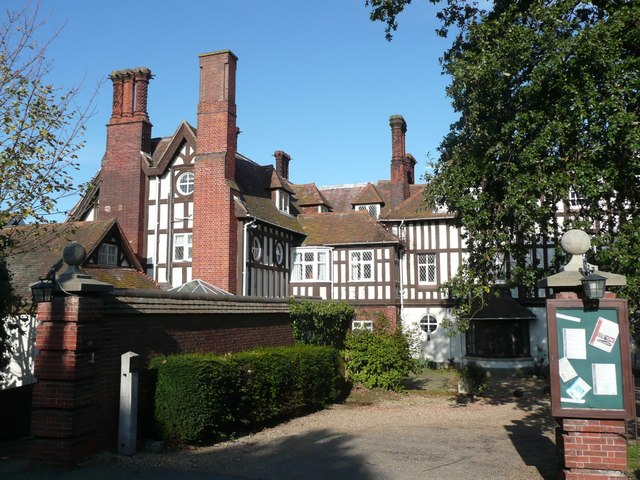

- Norfolk
- Hotel chain: Mackenzie Hotel Group

General information
- Location: Overstrand, North Norfolk, Norfolk, England, 16 High Street; Overstrand; Norfolk; NR27 0AB
- Coordinates: 52°55′1.75″N 1°20′42.06″E
- Opening: 1996

Technical details
- Floor count: 3 floors with connecting lift

Other information
- Number of rooms: 25 en-suite bedrooms
- Number of restaurants: 1 (Frazer’s)
- Number of bars: 1 (Clement Scott bar)
- Facilities: Croquet Lawn
- Parking: 50 spaces

Website
- Hotel Website

Listed Building – Grade II
- Designated: 15 February 1988
- Reference no.: 1170873

The Sea Marge Hotel is an AA 4-star hotel in the English seaside village of Overstrand in the county of Norfolk. The hotel also has 2 AA Rosettes for Food.

== Location ==
The hotel is situated on the cliff tops above Overstrand beach and is on the eastern side of the village centre, 22.9 miles (36.9 km) north of the city of Norwich. The hotel is 2.5 miles (4.0 km) east from the nearest railway station, which is at Roughton Road on the southern outskirts of Cromer. The nearest airport is in Norwich and is 19.0 miles (30.6 km) south of the hotel.

== History ==
The Sea Marge was designed by Architect Sir Arthur William Blomfield and was built between 1908 and 1912 as a country home for Sir Edgar Speyer. Speyer was an American-born financier and philanthropist of German parentage. Speyer was chairman of Speyer Brothers, an international finance house and chairman of the Underground Electric Railways Company of London (UERL, forerunner of the London Underground) from 1906 to 1915. Speyer rescued the Promenade Concerts from disaster and directed the funding of Captain Scott's Antarctic expeditions.

=== Spying accusations ===
Following the outbreak of the First World War and widespread suspicion of people of German descent, accusations of Speyer's disloyalty and treachery appeared in the press. Speyer was accused of signalling to German submarines from the cliff-top gardens of the Sea Marge. Lady Speyer was ostracised from societies and associations in both London and Norfolk, of which she had formerly been a member. Speyer and his family abandoned the house and moved to New York, soon after 1916, never to return to the Sea Marge.

=== Sale ===
On 16 February 1932, Speyer died from complications following an operation on his nose in Berlin. The Sea Marge and five acres of terraced gardens were sold as part of his estate in 1935. Following the sale, the house was turned into a hotel by a Mr Hartsharn and Mr G Varley in 1936. In 1955, the Sea Marge was sold to the local authority and was opened as a care home.

== The hotel today ==
In 1996, the Sea Marge was bought and restored by Marc and Liz Mackenzie. They re-opened it as the historic Grade II listed hotel it remains to this day, with the interior restored with the Edwardian fixtures and features retained respectfully. The hotel retains the gardens and terraced lawns that run down to the coastal path and beach beyond.
