= Emile Vandervelde =

Belgian politician (1866–1938)

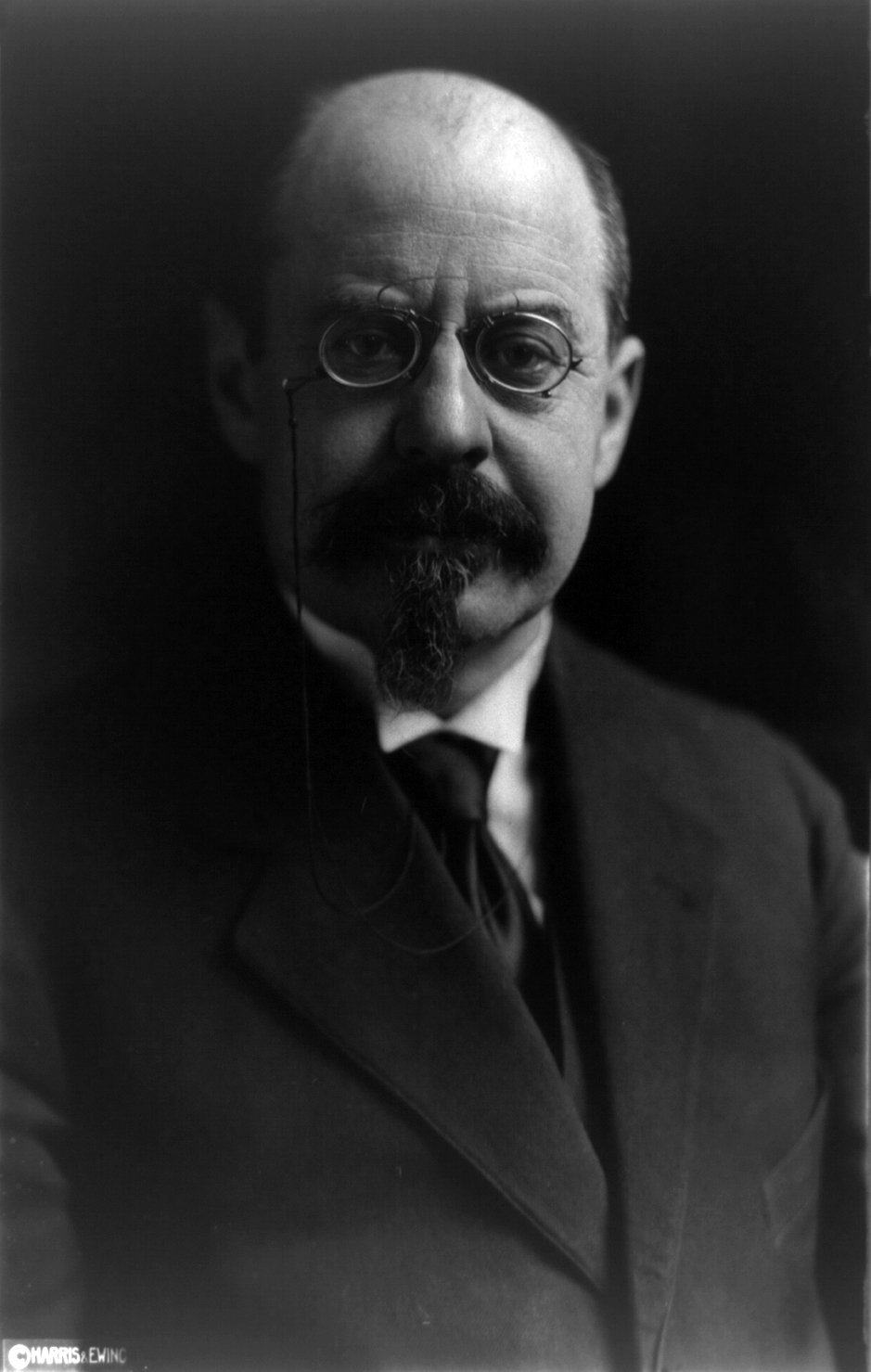
- Vandervelde, pictured in 1919

Minister of Foreign Affairs
- In office 17 June 1925 – 21 November 1927
- Prime Minister: Prosper Poullet; Henri Jaspar
- Preceded by: Paul Hymans
- Succeeded by: Paul Hymans

Minister of Justice
- In office 24 October 1918 – 21 November 1918
- Prime Minister: Gérard Cooreman
- Preceded by: Henry Carton de Wiart
- Succeeded by: Aloys Vande Vyvere

Personal details
- Born: 25 January 1866 Ixelles, Belgium
- Died: 27 December 1938 (aged 72) Ixelles, Belgium
- Party: Belgian Labour Party
- Spouse: Lalla Vandervelde
- Education: Université libre de Bruxelles
- Profession: Politician, economist, professor, lawyer

Emile Vandervelde (25 January 1866 – 27 December 1938) was a Belgian socialist politician. Nicknamed "the boss" (le patron), Vandervelde was a leading figure in the Belgian Labour Party (POB–BWP) and in international socialism.

== Career ==
Emile Auguste Vandervelde was born into a middle-class family in Ixelles, a suburb of Brussels, Belgium on 25 January 1866. Initially attracted by Liberal politics, Vandervelde entered the Free University of Brussels as a law student in 1881. However, he soon became interested in emerging socialist ideas and, in 1885, joined the small Workers' League of Ixelles (Ligue Ouvrière d'Ixelles). In 1886, he joined the newly formed Belgian Labour Party (POB–BWP). He worked as an academic at the Free University. Vandervelde was active in Belgian Freemasonry and was a member of the Lodge Les Amis philanthropes du Grand Orient de Belgique, in Brussels.

Following the extension of universal male suffrage in 1893, Vandervelde proposed a manifesto for the POB, known as the Charter of Quaregnon which would form the basis for Belgian socialist politics until the 1970s. In the 1894 elections, Vandervelde was elected to the Chamber of Representatives for the industrial city of Charleroi. He held the seat until 1890, when he transferred to Brussels which he held from 1900 to 1938. He was a staunch opponent of Leopold II and the absolute power he enjoyed in the Congo during the 1890s and wrote numerous articles against capitalist colonialism.

From 1900 to 1918, he held the position of president of the Second International.

Vandervelde was named Minister of State in 1914 and supported the policy of resistance to the German invasion of Belgium in World War I. As one of the more respected Socialists within Europe, he encouraged other socialists and other parties on the left to support the war against Germany. He wrote a telegram to the socialist party of Russia that called on the socialists to support the war effort. In 1916, he entered the de Broqueville government. He was a delegate for Belgium at the Treaty of Versailles and subsequently involved in the League of Nations. In 1923, he helped to found the Labour and Socialist International of which he held the presidency until 1938.

Vandervelde's principle political aims concerned the extension of universal suffrage and social democracy. As a theoretician, he wrote extensively on the role of the state in socialism. In 1913, he was named a corresponding member of the Classe des Lettres et des Sciences morales et politiques at the Royal Academy of Belgium, later becoming a titular member in 1929 and director of the Classe in 1933. He was an opponent of King Leopold II's attempts to expand his constitutional powers through the creation of the Congo Free State in the period leading up to the Free State's annexation by Belgium in 1908.

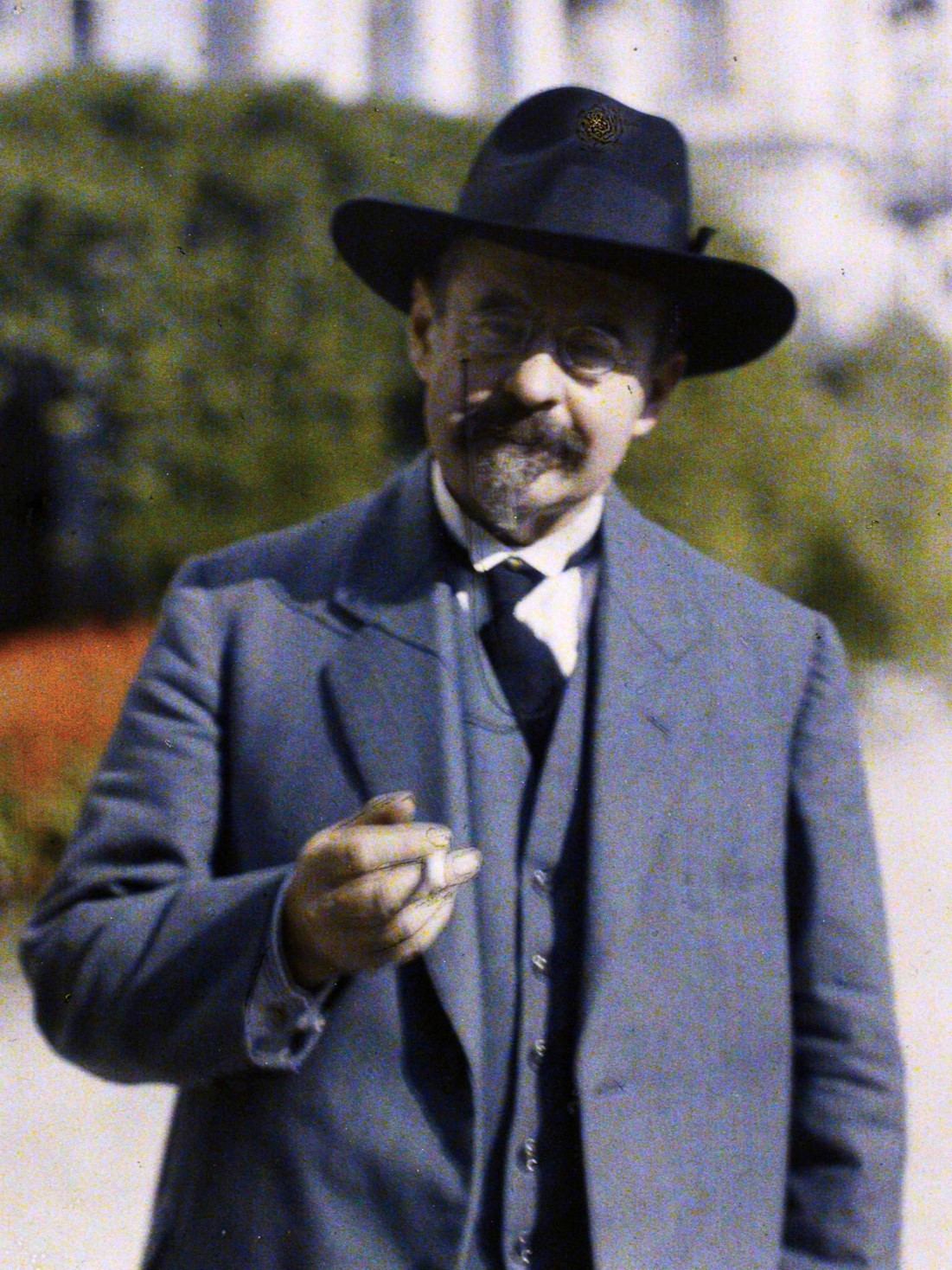
Vandervelde in Locarno, 1925 Autochrome by Roger Dumas

Vandervelde held the portfolio of Minister of Justice between 1918 and 1921 in which role he supported prison reform, measures against alcoholism, trade union rights and women's rights. In 1922, Vandervelde joined a group of socialist lawyers including Arthur Wauters, member of the Belgian Labour Party, Kurt Rosenfeld and Theodor Liebknecht, members of the Independent Social Democratic Party of Germany. They travelled to Russia as a group of socialist lawyers where they defended members of the Socialist Revolutionary Party in the 1922 Moscow Trial of Socialist Revolutionaries. This resulted in his inclusion into a satirical poem "Mayakovsky Gallery" by the Soviet poet Vladimir Mayakovsky. From 1925 to 1927, he held the role of Minister of Foreign Affairs where he contributed to the Locarno Pact. He subsequently held a position on the Council of Ministers (1935–36) and Minister of Public Health (1936–37) in the government of Paul Van Zeeland.

In 1933, Vandervelde became the POB's first president but increasingly found his internationalism and reformism challenged by a new generation of Belgian socialists. During the Spanish Civil War, Vandervelde's desire to intervene to halt the growing threat of fascism was challenged by Henri de Man and Paul-Henri Spaak.

His personal papers are held by the Institut Émile Vandervelde in Brussels.

== Works ==
- Les associations professionelles d'artisans et d'ouvriers en Belgique (1892)
- L'Evolution industrielle et le collectivisme (1896); English translation, Collectivism and Industrial Evolution (1901)
- Le question agraire en Belgique (1897)
- Le Socialisme en Belgique (1898), with Destrée
- L'Alcoolisme et les conditions de travail en Belgique (1899)
- Le propriété foncière en Belgique (1900)
- L'Exode rural et le retour aux champs (1903)
- Le Socialisme et l'agriculture (1906)
- Le Belgique et le Congo (1911)
- Three Aspects of The Russian Revolution (1918) (Archive.org)
- Le pays d'Israel : un marxiste en Palestine (1929) (sammlungen.ub.uni-frankfurt.de)

== Notes ==
Party political offices
Preceded by Arthur Henderson	President of the Labour and Socialist International; 1929–1936	Succeeded by Louis de Brouckère
