= History of rugby union matches between South Africa and the Barbarians =

South Africa and the Barbarians have played each other on nine occasions. The first encounter was in January 1952 and saw South Africa win 17–3 at the Cardiff Arms Park. More recently, the two teams have played in a "Final Challenge" match in the end-of-year rugby union tests, which is often played at Twickenham.

== Overall summary ==
Details	Played	Won by South Africa	Won by Barbarians	Drawn	South Africa points	Barbarians points
In South Africa	2	2	0	0	134	38
Neutral venue	8	3	4	1	150	154
Overall	10	5	4	1	284	192

== Matches ==
Date	Venue	Score	Victor	Notes
26 January 1952	Cardiff Arms Park, Cardiff	3–17	South Africa	
4 February 1961	Cardiff Arms Park, Cardiff	6–0	Barbarians	
31 January 1970	Twickenham, London	12–21	South Africa	
3 December 1994	Lansdowne Road, Dublin	23–15	Barbarians	
10 December 2000	Millennium Stadium, Cardiff	31–41	South Africa	
1 December 2007	Twickenham, London	22–5	Barbarians	2007 end of year test
4 December 2010	Twickenham, London	26–20	Barbarians	2010 end of year test
5 November 2016	Wembley Stadium, London	31–31	Draw	2016 November tests
28 June 2025	Cape Town Stadium, Cape Town	7–54	South Africa	
20 June 2026	Nelson Mandela Bay Stadium, Gqeberha	31–80	South Africa	
