= Lalla Vandervelde =

British-Beligian socialite and writer (1870-1965)

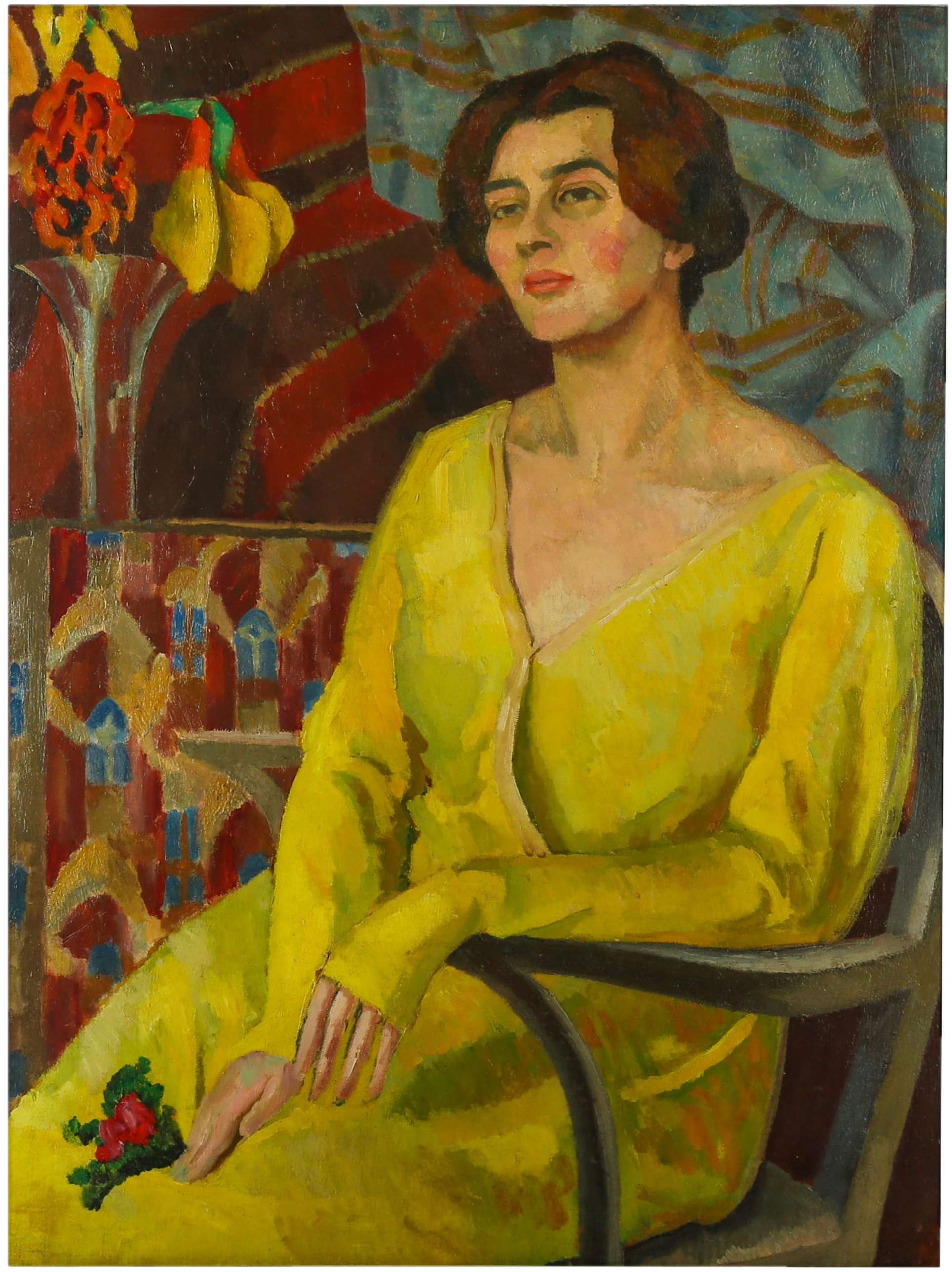
- 1917 portrait of Lalla Vandervelde by Roger Fry
- Born: Charlotte Helen Frederica Maria Speyer; 1870; Camberwell, England
- Died: 1965 (aged 94–95)
- Occupation(s): socialite, art patron
- Spouses: Ferdinand Kufferath (m. 1891; div. 1901); Émile Vandervelde
- Father: Edward Speyer

Lalla Vandervelde (1870–1965), was a British-Belgian socialite and patron of the arts. She was married to Émile Vandervelde, the former minister d'etat of Belgium, and had close relationships with several influential artists and writers of the early twentieth century, including Roger Fry.

== Early life ==
Lalla Vandervelde was born Charlotte Helen Frederica Maria Speyer in Camberwell, England in 1870. Her father, Edward Speyer (1839–1934), was a wealthy businessman and patron of music. Her grandfather, Wilhelm Speyer (1790–1878), was a German-Jewish composer.

Vandervelde's mother, Helen Franziska Forsboom of Frankfurt, Germany, died in 1882, when Vandervelde was twelve years old. In 1885, Edward Speyer remarried to Antonia Kufferath, the daughter of German composer Hubert Ferdinand Kufferath.

Vandervelde lived in Brussels for much of her adult life until the outbreak of World War I.

== Marriage ==
Vandervelde's first husband was Ferdinand Kufferath, the brother of her father's second wife and a Belgian civil engineer, whom she married on 19 January 1891 and divorced on 3 January 1901. The socialite then married Émile Vandervelde, a Belgian socialist politician. Lalla and Émile Vandervelde reportedly had a contentious relationship, with Emile omitting Lalla from his autobiography, Souvenirs d'un militant socialiste. The couple had no children.

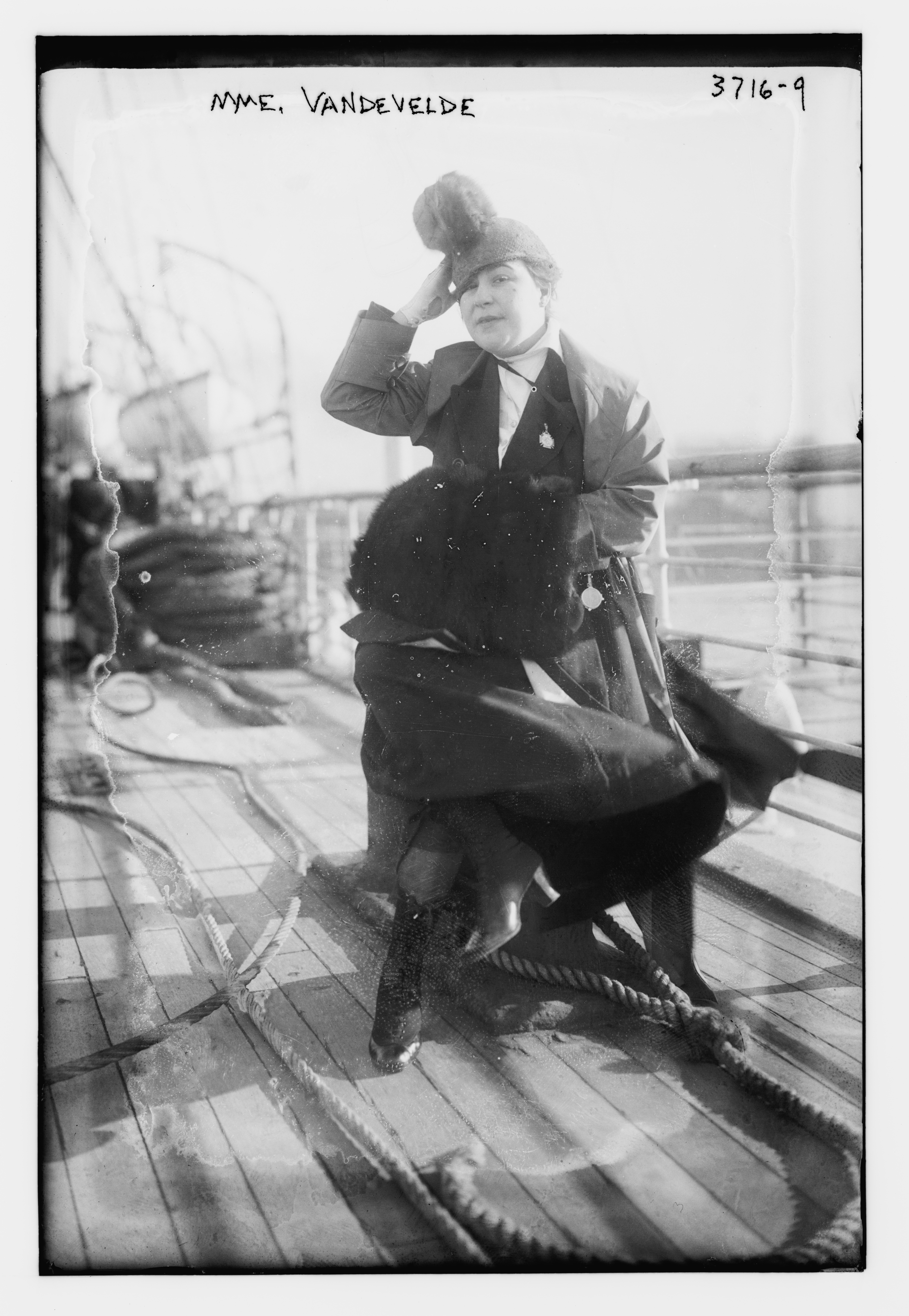
Photograph of Lalla Vandervelde ca. 1910-1920.

During World War I, Vandervelde embarked on a speaking tour throughout the United States with the goal of obtaining money for Belgian Relief.

== Artistic patronage and social influence ==
Vandervelde was acquainted with many of the most influential artists and writers of her day, especially members of the Bloomsbury Group. Her social circle included W.B. Yeats, George Bernard Shaw, Virginia Woolf, Aldous Huxley, Edward Elger, William Rothenstein, Venessa Bell, Roger Fry, and Arnold Bennett. In a 1917 letter, Bennett referred to Vandervelde as "a brilliant, cosmopolitan woman." Woolf and Huxley apparently disliked Vandervelde, with Woolf referring to her in one letter as a "Damned old Jewess" and Huxley calling her "La Grosse Lalla" in another.

In 1916, Vandervelde commissioned Roger Fry and the Omega Workshops to decorate her apartment in Chelsea, London.

Vandervelde also acted as a muse for several influential British artists of the early twentieth-century. William Rothenstein and Roger Fry painted portraits of her in 1916 and 1917, respectively. George Bernard Shaw reportedly wrote the play Augustus Does His Bit especially for Vandervelde, with Vandervelde performing the role of The Lady at the Royal Court Theatre in 1917.

== Later life ==
Vandervelde reportedly took up the hobby of automobile racing in her sixties. She died in 1965 at the age of 94.
