= History of rugby union matches between England and the Barbarians =

The Barbarians and England have played each other a total of 18 times to date. England have won 10 of those, and the Barbarians 8. All 18 matches have been played at Twickenham Stadium in London, but none has been awarded test status by the Rugby Football Union.

== Summary ==
Played	Won by England	Won by Barbarians	Drawn	England points	Barbarians points
18	10	8	0	666	560

== Matches ==
Date	Venue	Score	Winners	Comments
29 September 1990	Twickenham, London	18–16	England	
27 May 2001	Twickenham, London	29–43	Barbarians	
26 May 2002	Twickenham, London	53–29	England	
25 May 2003	Twickenham, London	36–49	Barbarians	
30 May 2004	Twickenham, London	12–32	Barbarians	
28 May 2005	Twickenham, London	39–52	Barbarians	
28 May 2006	Twickenham, London	46–19	England	
1 June 2008	Twickenham, London	17–14	England	
30 May 2009	Twickenham, London	26–33	Barbarians	
30 May 2010	Twickenham, London	35–26	England	
29 May 2011	Twickenham, London	32–38	Barbarians	Rugby World Cup warm-up
27 May 2012	Twickenham, London	57–26	England	2012 mid-year test
26 May 2013	Twickenham, London	40–12	England	2013 mid-year test
1 June 2014	Twickenham, London	29–39	Barbarians	2014 mid-year test
31 May 2015	Twickenham, London	73–12	England	2015 mid-year test
28 May 2017	Twickenham, London	28–14	England	2017 mid-year test
27 May 2018	Twickenham, London	45–63	Barbarians	2018 mid-year test
2 June 2019	Twickenham, London	51–43	England	2019 mid-year test
