= Killik Cup =

The Killik Cup is a rugby union trophy awarded to the winners of matches between the Barbarians and national teams. Killik & Co have sponsored an annual match involving the Barbarians in the UK since 2011. The cup was first contested in 2011 when the Barbarians played Australia, with the Barbarians losing 60–11. Most recently the Barbarians retained the cup, after defeating a World XV on 28 May 2023.

== Results ==
Year	Date	Venue	Home	Score	Away
2024	22 June	Twickenham Stadium, London, England	Barbarians	45-32	Fiji
2023	28 May	Twickenham Stadium, London, England	Barbarians	48-42	World XV
2022	13 November	Tottenham Hotspur Stadium, London, England	Barbarians	35-31	(New Zealand) All Blacks XV
2022	19 June	Twickenham Stadium, London, England	England	21–52	Barbarians
2021	27 November	Twickenham Stadium, London, England	Barbarians	(cancelled)	Samoa
2019	16 November	Twickenham Stadium, London, England	Barbarians	31–33	Fiji
2018	1 December	Twickenham Stadium, London, England	Barbarians	38–35	Argentina
2017	4 November	Twickenham Stadium, London, England	Barbarians	22–31	New Zealand
2016	5 November	Wembley Stadium, London, England	Barbarians	31–31	South Africa
2015	21 November	Twickenham Stadium, London, England	Barbarians	31–49	Argentina
2014	1 November	Twickenham Stadium, London, England	Barbarians	36–40	Australia
2013	30 November	Twickenham Stadium, London, England	Barbarians	43–19	Fiji
2012	27 May	Twickenham Stadium, London, England	England	57–26	Barbarians
2011	26 November	Twickenham Stadium, London, England	Barbarians	11–60	Australia
