= Barbarian F.C. =

British rugby union team

- Full name: Barbarian Rugby Football Club
- Nickname: Baa-Baas
- Founded: 1890; 136 years ago
- Coach: (New Zealand) Robbie Deans
- Most appearances: (Ireland) Tony O'Reilly (30)
- Top scorer: (Ireland) Tony O'Reilly (38 tries)
Team kit

First match
- Hartlepool Rovers 4–9 Barbarians (27 December 1890)

Largest win
- Belgium 10–84 Barbarians (24 May 2008)

Largest defeat
- England XV 73–12 Barbarians (31 May 2015)

Official website
- www.barbarianfc.co.uk

The Barbarian Football Club, known as the Barbarians, is a British-based invitational rugby union club. The Barbarians play in black and white hoops, though players wear socks from their own club strip. Membership is by invitation. As of 2011, players from 31 countries had played for them. Traditionally at least one uncapped player is selected for each match.

Until rugby union became a professional sport, the Barbarians usually played six annual matches: with Penarth, Cardiff, Swansea and Newport at Easter; a game with Leicester on 27 December and the Mobbs Memorial Match against East Midlands in the spring. In 1948, the Barbarians were invited to face Australia as part of the Wallabies' tour of Britain, Ireland and France. Although initially designed as a fundraiser towards the end of the tour, the encounter became a popular and traditional fixture. Initially played every three years, it has become more frequent in the professional era, with the Barbarians now often playing one of the national teams visiting Britain each autumn.

On 29 May 2011, at halftime in the Barbarians' match against England at Twickenham, the Barbarians and their founder William Percy Carpmael were honoured with induction to the IRB Hall of Fame. A women's team was established in 2017.

Many rugby clubs around the world are based on the Barbarians model of an invitational scratch team, including the French Barbarians, Australian Barbarians, New Zealand Barbarians and South African Barbarians.

== History ==
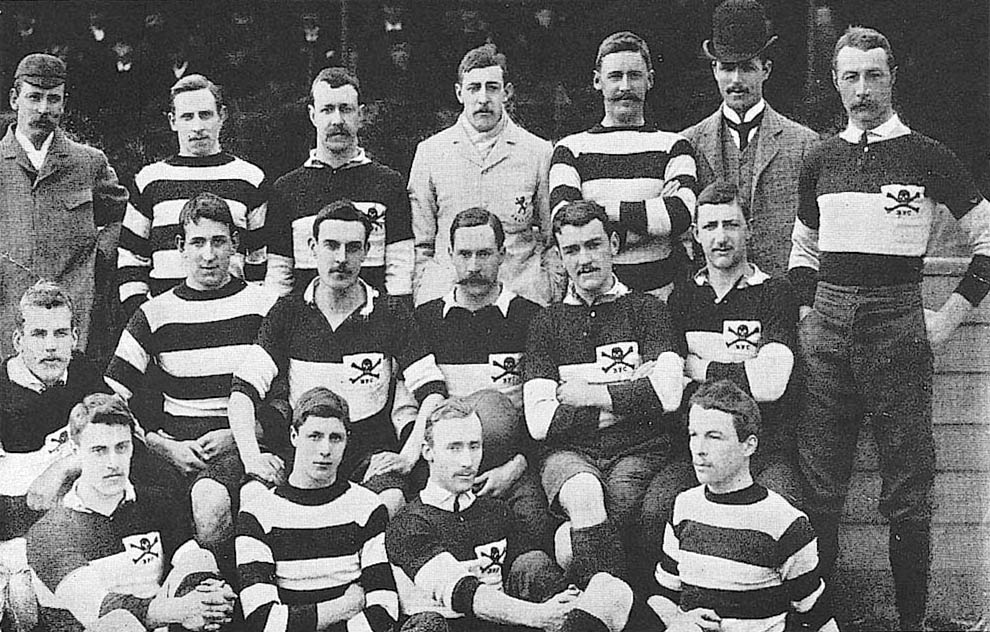
Barbarians team that played Devonshire at Exeter, 1 April 1891

The Barbarian Club was formed by William Percy Carpmael, who had played rugby for Cambridge University, and had been part of the Cambridge team which had undertaken a tour of Yorkshire in 1884. Inspired by the culture behind short rugby tours he organised his first tour in 1889 with Clapham Rovers, which was followed by an 1890 tour with an invitational team calling themselves the Southern Nomads. At the time practically every club ceased playing in early March; there were no tours and players just 'packed up' until the following season. In 1890 he took the Southern Nomads – mainly composed of players from Blackheath – on a tour of some northern counties of England.

His idea – collecting a touring side from all sources to tackle a few leading clubs in the land – received strong support from leading players, particularly ex-university players. On 8 April 1890, in Leuchters Restaurant and later at the Alexandra Hotel in Bradford, the concept of the Barbarians was agreed upon. The team toured later that year and beat Hartlepool Rovers 9–4 on 27 December in their first fixture.

The team was given the motto by Walter Julius Carey, former Bishop of Bloemfontein and a former member of the Barbarians:

Rugby Football is a game for gentlemen in all classes, but for no bad sportsman in any class

=== Penarth ===
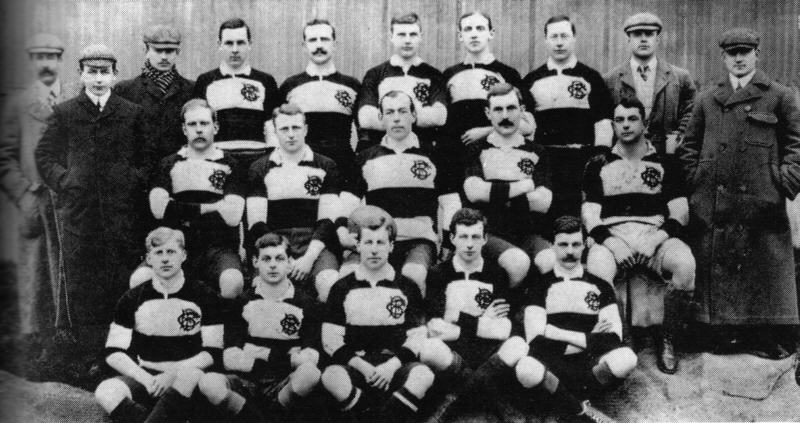
The Barbarians in 1904

The concept took hold over the years and the nearest thing to a club home came to be the Esplanade Hotel at Penarth in South Wales, where the Barbarians always stayed on their Easter tours of Wales. The annual Good Friday game against the Barbarians was the highlight of the Penarth club's year and was always attended by enthusiastic capacity crowds. This fixture marked the start of the Baa-Baas' annual South Wales tour from their "spiritual home" of Penarth, which also included playing Cardiff RFC on the Saturday, Swansea RFC on Easter Monday and Newport RFC on the Tuesday.

The non-match day of Easter Sunday would always see the Barbarians playing golf at the Glamorganshire Golf Club, in Penarth, while the former Esplanade Hotel, which was located on the seafront at Penarth, would host the gala party for the trip, sponsored by Penarth RFC. The first match took place in 1901, and over the next 75 encounters, Penarth won eleven games, drew four and lost 60. Between 1920 and the first Athletics Field game in 1925, the Good Friday games were hosted on Penarth County Grammar School's sports field.

The final Penarth v Barbarians game was played in 1986, by which time the Penarth club had slipped from its prominent position in Welsh rugby. However, a special commemorative game, recognising the 100 years since the first Good Friday match, took place in 2001 and was played at the Athletic Field next to the Penarth clubhouse the day before the Barbarians played Wales at the Millennium Stadium. Gary Teichmann, captain of South Africa and the Barbarians, unveiled a plaque at the clubhouse to mark the event.

=== The Final Challenge ===
After the Second World War, in 1948, the Barbarians were asked by the British and Irish unions to raise a side to play the touring Australia team, to raise funds for the Australians' journey home via Canada. This started the tradition of the "Final Challenge" – played as the last match in a tour of Britain and Ireland by Australia, New Zealand or South Africa.

==== 'The best try ever scored' ====
The Barbarian 'Final Challenge' match with the All Blacks at Cardiff Arms Park on 27 January 1973 is celebrated as one of the best games of rugby union ever played. It was a game of attack and counterattack, and the Barbarians won the match 23–11, handing the All Blacks their fourth defeat of the tour. Gareth Edwards scored a try widely considered to be one of the best ever in rugby union.

Cliff Morgan described Gareth Edwards' try:

Kirkpatrick to Williams. This is great stuff! Phil Bennett covering chased by Alistair Scown. Brilliant, oh, that's brilliant! John Williams, Bryan Williams. Pullin. John Dawes, great dummy. To David, Tom David, the half-way line! Brilliant by Quinnell! This is Gareth Edwards! A dramatic start! What a score!!.....Oh that fellow Edwards....If the greatest writer of the written word would've written that story no one would have believed it. That really was something.

Gareth Edwards said of the match:

People tend only to remember the first four minutes of the game because of the try, but what they forgot is the great deal of good rugby played afterwards, much of which came from the All Blacks. For us after the success of the 1971 British Lions tour, which captured the imagination of the whole country, it was an opportunity to bring a lot of that side together again.

=== Traditional matches ===
The nature of the Barbarians as a touring side made for a diverse fixture list, but at a number of points in the club's history they have settled for a time into a regular pattern. Most of these regular matches have fallen by the wayside, whilst others continue to the present day:

- 27 December game against Leicester Tigers – this began in 1909 as the third and final match of the Christmas Tour. It was played for the last time as a regular fixture in March 2006 but returned in November 2014 when the Barbarians beat Leicester 59–26 in their 125th anniversary season.
- The Edgar Mobbs Memorial Match – held for Edgar Mobbs, who was killed in the First World War. Played at Franklins Gardens against Northampton Saints, Bedford Blues or the East Midlands select XV. The first took place on 10 February 1921, and in later years became a tradition on the first Thursday in March. The last Mobbs Match to feature the Barbarians took place in April 2011. Since then, the invited opposition has been a British Army side instead of the Barbarians.
- Easter Tour – traditionally four matches against Penarth RFC (Good Friday), Cardiff RFC/Cardiff Blues (Holy Saturday); Swansea RFC (Easter Monday) and Newport RFC (Tuesday following Easter Monday). The Penarth match was dropped after 1986 as a regular fixture although in 2001 a special commemorative game, recognising 100 years since the first Good Friday match, was played at the Athletic Field next to the Penarth clubhouse the day before the Barbarians played Wales at the Millennium Stadium. The game against Newport was moved away from Easter after the 1982 fixture due to problems fielding a team for the fourth match of the tour and was played as a midweek game early in the season from September 1982 onwards. The Barbarians last played Newport in November 1996.
- The Final Challenge – played as the last match in a tour of the UK by Australia, New Zealand or South Africa. Initially played every three years, these games have become more frequent in the professional era. The fixture on 3 December 2008 between the Barbarians and Australia was played at Wembley Stadium, the first rugby union match played there since its redevelopment.
- Remembrance Day game against the Combined Services, played in November. The fixture was first played in 1997 and the most recent game, in 2014, resulted in a 31–15 win for the Barbarians.

They typically compete against teams from the home nations (England, Wales, Scotland and Ireland) as well as other international sides. Other matches are played against club teams, often to celebrate anniversaries. The 2014–15 fixture list included matches against Leicester Tigers and Heriot's Rugby Club in addition to the Final Challenge game with Australia and the annual Combined Services match. The Heriot's game celebrated the 125th anniversary of both that club and the Barbarians, while the Leicester game was also part of the Barbarians' 125th anniversary schedule. The Barbarians were also invited to play in the first ever Rugby match at the London Olympic Stadium in 2015 against Samoa.

=== Olympic rugby union centenary celebration match ===
Australia was approached by the British Olympic Association to play the Barbarians at Wembley Stadium on 3 December 2008. The match formed part of the BOA's programme of events to celebrate the centenary of the first London Olympic Games where Australia defeated a Great Britain (Cornwall) side in the final 32–3. In 1908 France were the defending Olympic champions, but when they withdrew from the event, leaving just Australia and Great Britain to contest the gold medal, it was then County champions Cornwall who took to the field to represent the host nation. Cornwall had already been defeated in Australia's earlier 31-match tour. Cornwall's 1908 contribution was also further recognised by the presentation of the Cornwall Cup to the winning 2008 captain at Wembley, with the players of the respective sides receiving gold or silver commemorative medals. The 2008 game was the first rugby union fixture to take place in the new Wembley Stadium. Australia went on to win 18 points to 11.

In a change to the tradition of the Barbarians players wearing their own club socks, in this game, they all wore Cornwall's black and gold socks. The break with the tradition was highly regarded by the secretary of the Cornwall Rugby Football Union, Alan Mitchell, who was said to have been humbled by the honour.

== Matches against national teams ==
The Barbarian F.C. have played men's international matches since 1915 and women's international matches since 2019.

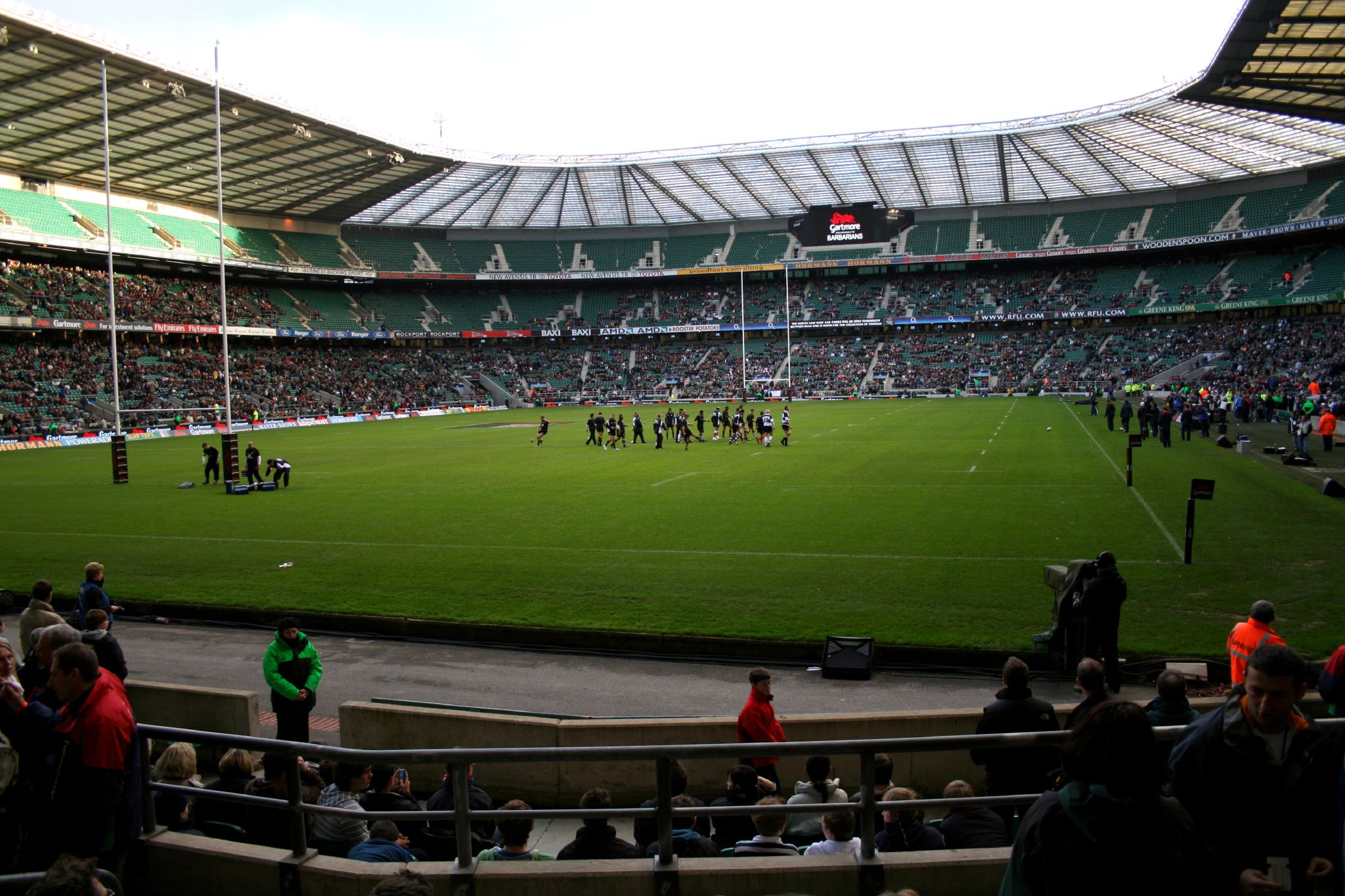
View of the stadium during the match v South Africa, 2007

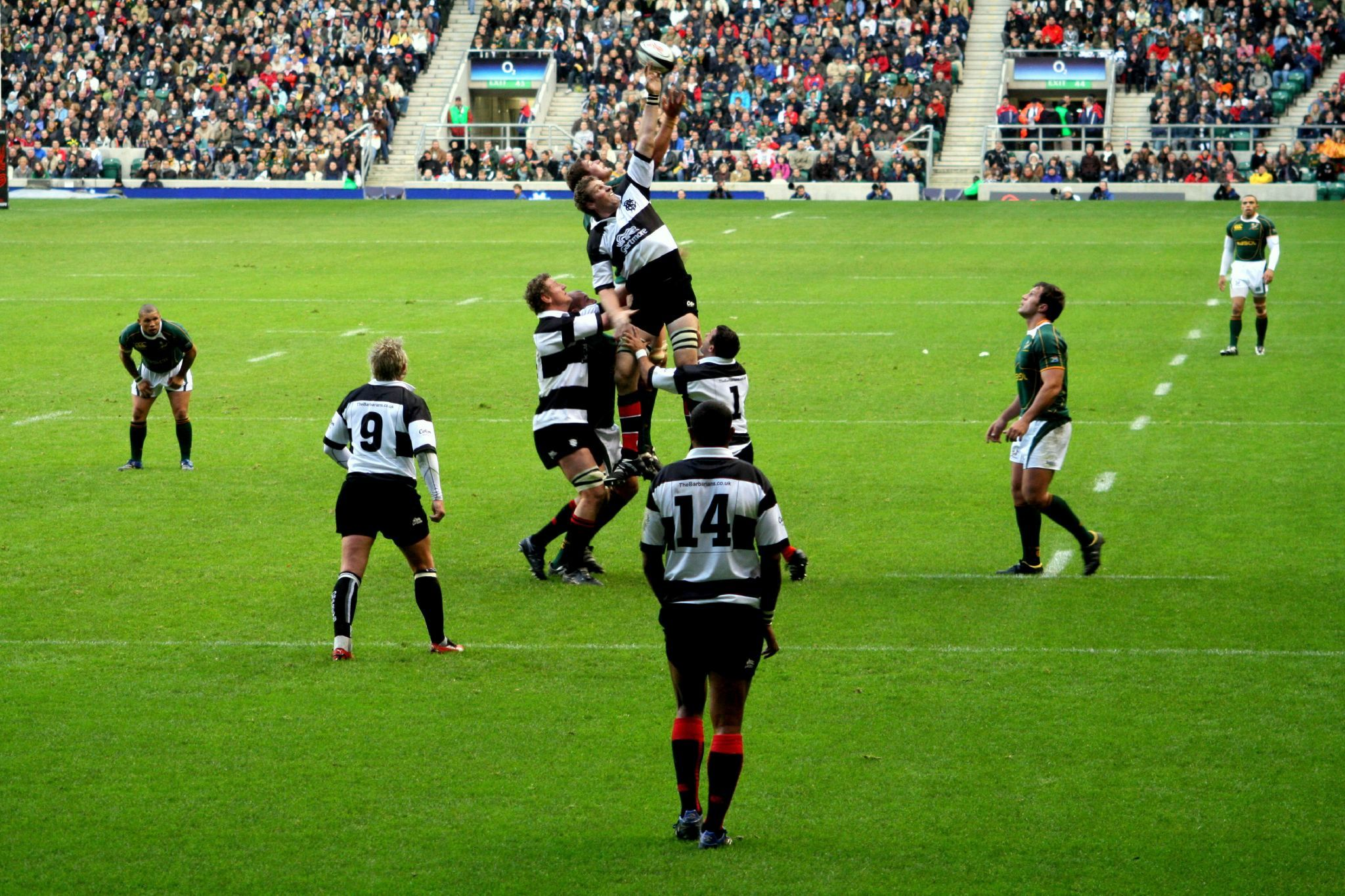
Barbarians v South Africa in 2007

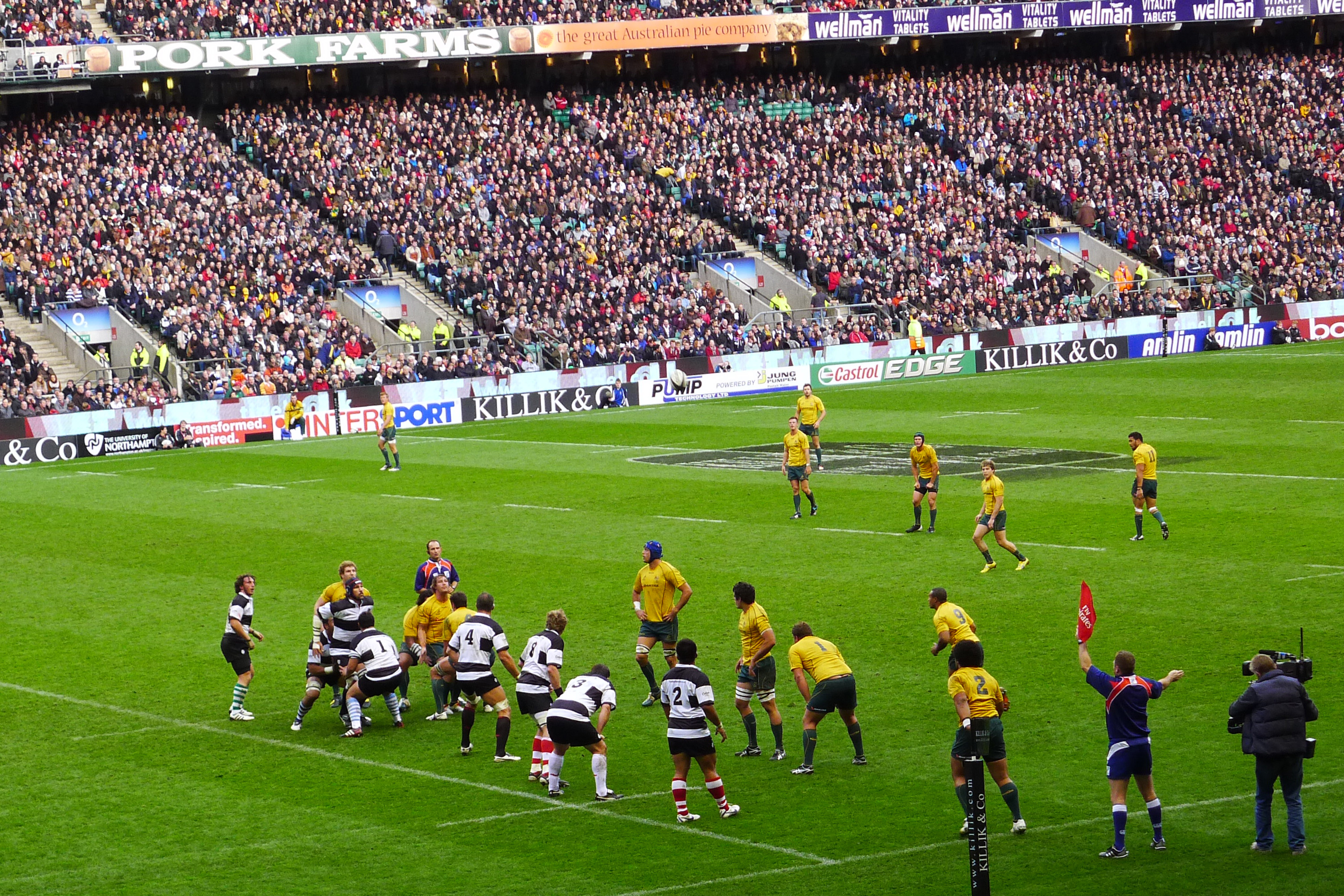
Barbarians v Australia in 2011

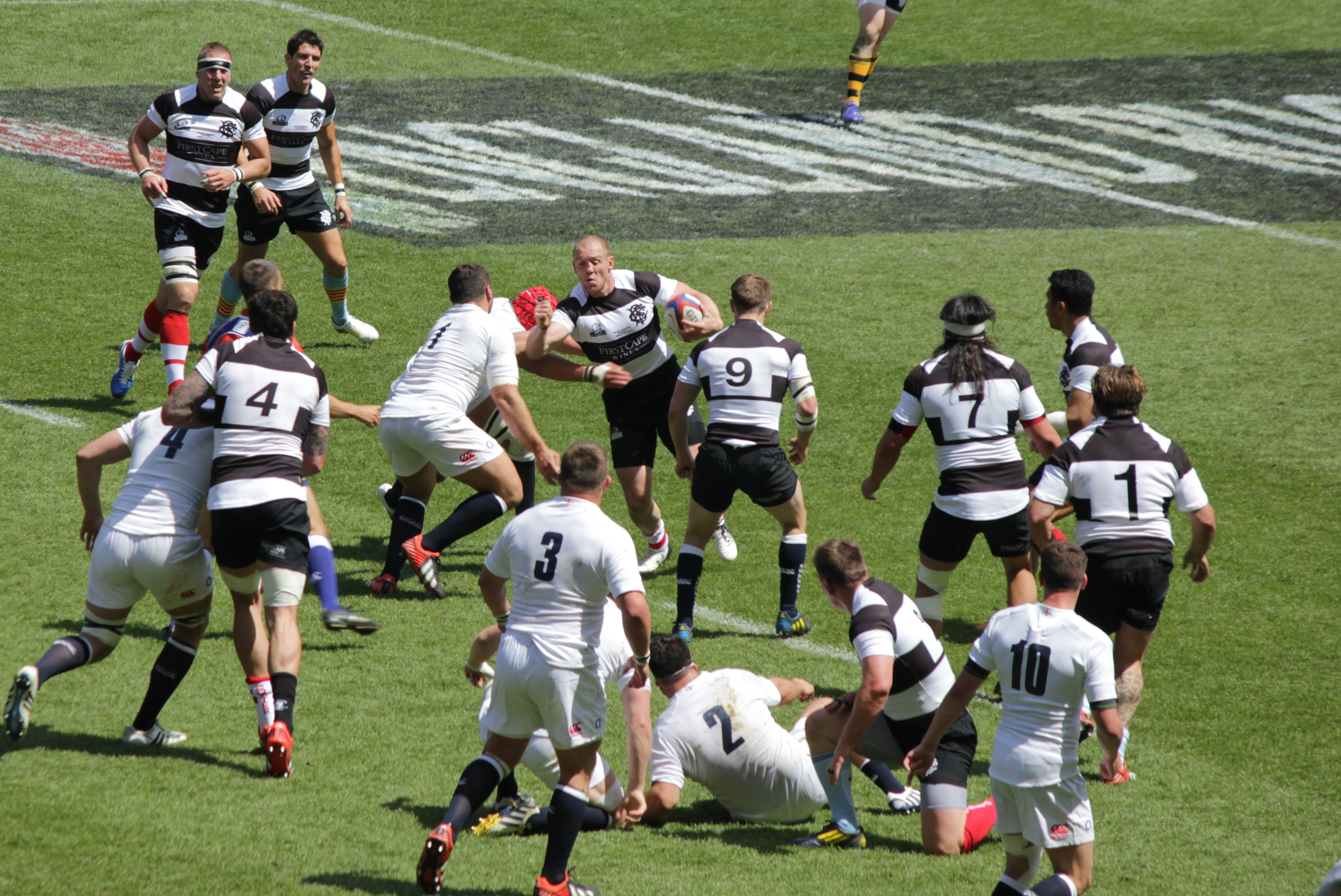
Barbarians v England in 2013

Opposing Teams	For	Against	Result	Date	Venue	City	Competition
Wales	26	10	Won	17 April 1915	Cardiff Arms Park	Cardiff	Tour match To raise 'patriotic funds'
Australia	9	6	Won	31 January 1948	Cardiff Arms Park	Cardiff	Final Challenge
South Africa	3	17	Lost	26 January 1952	Cardiff Arms Park	Cardiff	Final Challenge
New Zealand	5	19	Lost	20 February 1954	Cardiff Arms Park	Cardiff	Final Challenge
Australia	11	6	Won	22 February 1958	Cardiff Arms Park	Cardiff	Final Challenge
East Africa	52	12	Won	28 May 1958	RFUEA Ground	Nairobi	Tour match
South Africa	6	0	Won	4 February 1961	Cardiff Arms Park	Cardiff	Final Challenge
Canada	3	3	Draw	17 November 1962	Gosforth Greyhound Stadium	Gosforth	Tour match
New Zealand	3	36	Lost	15 February 1964	Cardiff Arms Park	Cardiff	Final Challenge
Australia	11	17	Lost	30 January 1967	Cardiff Arms Park	Cardiff	Final Challenge
New Zealand	6	11	Lost	16 December 1967	Twickenham	London	Final Challenge
Rhodesia	24	21	Won	26 May 1969	Police Grounds	Salisbury	Tour match
South Africa	12	21	Lost	31 January 1970	Twickenham	London	Tour match
Scotland	33	17	Won	9 May 1970	Murrayfield	Edinburgh	Tour match In aid of 1970 British Commonwealth Games
Fiji	9	29	Lost	24 October 1970	Gosforth Greyhound Stadium	Gosforth	Final Challenge
New Zealand	23	11	Won	27 January 1973	Cardiff Arms Park	Cardiff	Final Challenge
New Zealand	13	13	Draw	30 November 1974	Twickenham	London	Final Challenge
Australia	19	7	Won	24 January 1976	Cardiff Arms Park	Cardiff	Final Challenge
Canada	29	4	Won	12 June 1976	York Stadium	Toronto	Tour match
British Lions	14	23	Lost	10 September 1977	Twickenham	London	Silver Jubilee Match
New Zealand	16	18	Lost	16 December 1978	Cardiff Arms Park	Cardiff	Final Challenge
Scotland	26	13	Won	26 March 1983	Murrayfield	Edinburgh	Tour match
Australia	30	37	Lost	15 December 1984	Cardiff Arms Park	Cardiff	Final Challenge
Italy	23	15	Won	26 May 1985	Stadio Flaminio	Rome	Tour match
Australia	22	40	Lost	26 November 1988	Cardiff Arms Park	Cardiff	Final Challenge
New Zealand	10	21	Lost	25 November 1989	Twickenham	London	Final Challenge
England	16	18	Lost	29 September 1990	Twickenham	London	Tour match Centenary celebrations
Wales	31	24	Won	6 October 1990	Cardiff Arms Park	Cardiff	Tour match Centenary celebrations
Argentina	34	22	Won	17 November 1990	Cardiff Arms Park	Cardiff	Final Challenge
Scotland	16	16	Draw	7 September 1991	Murrayfield	Edinburgh	Tour match
Russia	23	27	Lost	6 June 1992	Lokomotiv	Moscow	Tour match
Australia	20	30	Lost	28 November 1992	Twickenham	London	Final Challenge
New Zealand	12	25	Lost	4 December 1993	Cardiff Arms Park	Cardiff	Final Challenge
Zimbabwe	21	23	Lost	4 June 1994	Police Grounds	Harare	Tour match
South Africa	23	15	Won	3 December 1994	Lansdowne Road	Dublin	Final Challenge
Ireland	70	38	Won	19 May 1996	Lansdowne Road	Dublin	Tour match Peace International
Scotland	48	45	Won	17 August 1996	Murrayfield	Edinburgh	Tour match Dunblane Disaster Fund Match
Wales	10	31	Lost	24 August 1996	Cardiff Arms Park	Cardiff	Tour match Fully capped match for Wales
Australia	12	39	Lost	7 December 1996	Twickenham	London	Final Challenge
Ireland	31	30	Won	28 May 2000	Lansdowne Road	Dublin	Tour match
Scotland	45	42	Won	31 May 2000	Murrayfield	Edinburgh	Tour match
Germany	47	19	Won	12 August 2000	Eilenriedestadion	Hanover	Tour match German Rugby Federation Centenary Match
South Africa	31	41	Lost	10 December 2000	Millennium Stadium	Cardiff	Final Challenge
Wales	40	38	Won	20 May 2001	Millennium Stadium	Cardiff	Tour match
Scotland	74	31	Won	24 May 2001	Murrayfield	Edinburgh	Tour match
England	43	29	Won	27 May 2001	Twickenham	London	Tour match
Australia	35	49	Lost	28 November 2001	Millennium Stadium	Cardiff	Final Challenge
England	29	53	Lost	26 May 2002	Twickenham	London	Tour match
Wales	40	25	Won	29 May 2002	Millennium Stadium	Cardiff	Tour match
Scotland	47	27	Won	1 June 2002	Murrayfield	Edinburgh	Tour match
England	49	36	Won	25 May 2003	Twickenham	London	Tour match
Scotland	24	15	Won	28 May 2003	Murrayfield	Edinburgh	Tour match
Wales	48	35	Won	1 June 2003	Millennium Stadium	Cardiff	Tour match
Scotland	40	33	Won	22 May 2004	Murrayfield	Edinburgh	Tour match
Wales	0	42	Lost	27 May 2004	Ashton Gate	Bristol	Tour match
England	32	12	Won	30 May 2004	Twickenham	London	Tour match
Portugal	66	34	Won	10 June 2004	Universitário Lisboa	Lisbon	Tour match
New Zealand	19	47	Lost	4 December 2004	Twickenham	London	Final Challenge
Scotland	7	38	Lost	24 May 2005	Pittodrie	Aberdeen	Tour match
England	52	39	Won	28 May 2005	Twickenham	London	Tour match
England	19	46	Lost	28 May 2006	Twickenham	London	Tour match
Scotland	19	66	Lost	31 May 2006	Murrayfield	Edinburgh	Tour match
Georgia	28	19	Won	4 June 2006	Mikheil Meskhi Stadium	Tbilisi	Tour match
Tunisia	33	10	Won	19 May 2007	Stade El Menzah	Tunis	Tour match
Spain	52	26	Won	23 May 2007	Martínez Valero	Elche	Tour match
South Africa	22	5	Won	1 December 2007	Twickenham	London	Final Challenge
Belgium	84	10	Won	24 May 2008	Stade Roi Baudouin	Brussels	Tour match
Ireland	14	39	Lost	27 May 2008	Kingsholm	Gloucester	Tour match
England	14	17	Lost	1 June 2008	Twickenham	London	Tour match
Australia	11	18	Lost	3 December 2008	Wembley Stadium	London	Final Challenge / Cornwall Cup
England	33	26	Won	3 May 2009	Twickenham	London	Tour match
Australia	7	55	Lost	6 June 2009	Sydney Football Stadium	Sydney	Tour match
New Zealand	25	18	Won	5 December 2009	Twickenham	London	Final Challenge
England	26	35	Lost	30 May 2010	Twickenham	London	Tour match
Ireland	29	23	Won	4 June 2010	Thomond Park	Limerick	Tour match
South Africa	26	20	Won	4 December 2010	Twickenham	London	Final Challenge
England	38	32	Won	29 May 2011	Twickenham	London	Tour match
Wales	31	28	Won	4 June 2011	Millennium Stadium	Cardiff	Tour match Celebration of 130th anniversary of the WRU; fully capped match for Wales
Australia	11	60	Lost	26 November 2011	Twickenham	London	Final Challenge
England	26	57	Lost	27 May 2012	Twickenham	London	Tour match
Ireland	29	28	Won	29 May 2012	Kingsholm Stadium	Gloucester	Tour match
Wales	21	30	Lost	2 June 2012	Millennium Stadium	Cardiff	Tour match Fully capped match for Wales
England	12	40	Lost	26 May 2013	Twickenham	London	Tour match
British & Irish Lions	8	59	Lost	1 June 2013	Hong Kong Stadium	Hong Kong	Lions tour match
Fiji	43	17	Won	30 November 2013	Twickenham	London	Tour match
England	39	29	Won	1 June 2014	Twickenham	London	Tour match
Australia	36	40	Lost	1 November 2014	Twickenham	London	Tour match
Ireland	22	21	Won	28 May 2015	Thomond Park	Limerick	Tour match
England	12	73	Lost	31 May 2015	Twickenham	London	Tour match
Samoa	27	24	Won	29 August 2015	Olympic Stadium	London	Tour match
Argentina	31	49	Lost	21 November 2015	Twickenham	London	Tour match
South Africa	31	31	Draw	5 November 2016	Wembley Stadium	London	Tour match Killik Cup
Czech Republic	71	0	Won	8 November 2016	Markéta Stadium	Prague	Tour match Celebration of 90th anniversary of the Czech Rugby Union
Fiji	40	7	Won	11 November 2016	Ravenhill Stadium	Belfast	Tour match
England	14	28	Lost	28 May 2017	Twickenham	London	Tour match Old Mutual Wealth Cup
Australia	28	31	Lost	28 October 2017	Sydney Football Stadium	Sydney	Tour match
New Zealand	22	31	Lost	4 November 2017	Twickenham	London	Tour match
Tonga	27	24	Won	10 November 2017	Thomond Park	Limerick	Tour match
England	63	45	Won	28 May 2018	Twickenham	London	Tour match Quilter Cup
Argentina	38	35	Won	1 December 2018	Twickenham	London	Tour match
England	43	51	Lost				
Fiji	31	33	Lost	16 November 2019	Twickenham	London	Tour match
Brazil	47	22	Won	20 November 2019	Estádio do Morumbi	São Paulo	Tour match
Wales	33	43	Lost				
England	Cancelled	Cancelled	Cancelled	25 October 2020	Twickenham	London	Quilter Cup Moved from June fixture due to COVID-19 Pandemic; Cancelled on 23 October 2020 due to players breaking COVID rules
Samoa	Cancelled	Cancelled	Cancelled				
England	52	21	Won	19 June 2022	Twickenham	London	Quilter Cup
Spain	26	7	Won	25 June 2022	El Molinón	Gijón	
(New Zealand) All Blacks XV	35	31	Won	13 November 2022	Tottenham Hotspur Stadium	London	Killik Cup
World XV	48	42	Won	28 May 2023	Twickenham	London	Killik Cup
Samoa	14	28	Lost	18 August 2023	Stade Amédée-Domenech	Brive-la-Gaillarde	Tour match
Wales	26	49	Lost	4 November 2023	Millennium Stadium	Cardiff	Tour match
Fiji	45	32	Won	22 June 2024	Twickenham	London	Tour match
South Africa	7	54	Lost	28 June 2025	Cape Town Stadium	Cape Town	Tour match Qatar Airways Cup
South Africa	31	80	Lost	20 June 2026	Nelson Mandela Bay Stadium	Gqeberha	Tour match
Wales	31	33	Lost	27 June 2026	Twickenham	London	Tour match

=== Overall ===
Match summary as of 28 June 2025
Against	Played	Won	Lost	Drawn	Win %
Argentina	3	2	1	0	66.66%
Australia	14	3	11	0	21.43%
Belgium	1	1	0	0	100.00%
Brazil	1	1	0	0	100.00%
Canada	2	1	0	1	50.00%
Czech Republic	1	1	0	0	100.00%
East Africa	1	1	0	0	100.00%
England	19	9	10	0	47.37%
Fiji	5	2	2	0	40.00%
Georgia	1	1	0	0	100.00%
Germany	1	1	0	0	100.00%
Ireland	6	5	1	0	83.33%
Italy	1	1	0	0	100.00%
British & Irish Lions	2	0	2	0	0.00%
New Zealand	11	2	8	1	18.18%
Portugal	1	1	0	0	100.00%
Russia	1	0	1	0	0.00%
Samoa	2	1	1	0	50.00%
Scotland	11	8	2	1	72.73%
South Africa	10	4	5	1	40.00%
Spain	2	2	0	0	100.00%
Tonga	1	1	0	0	100.00%
Tunisia	1	1	0	0	100.00%
Wales	12	6	6	0	50.00%
Zimbabwe (& Rhodesia)	2	1	1	0	50.00%
Total	112	56	51	4	50.00%
TOTAL	112	56	51	4	50.00%

=== Men ===
Men's Barbarians squad to play South Africa on 20 June. Sintu Manjezi was a late call-up to the squad ahead of the South African match.

On 22 June, the Barbarians confirmed several additions to the squad ahead of their match against Wales on 27 June.

Head coach: (New Zealand) Scott Robertson

Note: Bold denotes players that have represented the Barbarians in previous international matches. Italics represents uncapped players.

Note: Flags indicate national union under World Rugby eligibility rules.

Player	Position	Date of birth (age)	Club/province	Union
Elliot Dee	Hooker	7 March 1994 (age 32)	(Wales) Dragons	Wales
Leonel Oviedo	Hooker	16 February 1998 (age 28)	(Australia) Western Force	Argentina
**Harry Thacker**	Hooker	18 February 1994 (age 32)	(England) Bristol Bears	England
**Paul Alo-Emile**	Prop	22 December 1991 (age 34)	(France) Stade Français Paris	Samoa
Pedro Delgado	Prop	1 September 1997 (age 29)	(England) Harlequins	Argentina
Jack Iscaro	Prop	4 August 1997 (age 29)	(France) Stade Français Paris	United States
D'Arcy Rae	Prop	21 December 1994 (age 31)	(Scotland) Edinburgh	Scotland
Oli Kebble	Prop	18 June 1992 (age 34)	(South Africa) Stormers	Scotland
Giorgi Kharaishvili	Prop	13 February 1999 (age 27)	(France) Racing 92	(Georgia (country)) Georgia
Vincent Koch	Prop	13 March 1990 (age 36)	(South Africa) Sharks	South Africa
D'Arcy Rae	Prop	21 December 1994 (age 31)	(Scotland) Edinburgh	Scotland
**Kyle Sinckler**	Prop	30 March 1993 (age 33)	(France) Toulon	England
Mayco Vivas	Prop	2 June 1998 (age 28)	(France) Oyonnax	Argentina
Franco Molina	Lock	28 August 1997 (age 29)	(Australia) Western Force	Argentina
Sintu Manjezi	Lock	7 April 1995 (age 31)	(South Africa) Bulls	South Africa
Alexander Moon	Lock	6 September 1996 (age 30)	(France) Bayonne	England
Izack Rodda	Lock	20 August 1996 (age 30)	(France) Provence	Australia
Guido Petti	Lock	17 November 1994 (age 32)	(England) Harlequins	Argentina
Lukhan Salakaia-Loto	Lock	19 September 1996 (age 30)	(Australia) Queensland Reds	Australia
Romain Taofifénua	Lock	14 September 1990 (age 36)	(France) Racing 92	France
**Lachlan Boshier**	Back row	16 November 1994 (age 32)	(Japan) Saitama Wild Knights	New Zealand
Miracle Faiʻilagi	Back row	21 August 1999 (age 27)	(New Zealand) Moana Pasifika	Samoa
Nathan Hughes	Back row	10 June 1991 (age 35)	(France) Racing 92	England
Jordan Joseph	Back row	31 July 2000 (age 26)	(France) Racing 92	France
Liam McConnell	Back row	24 June 2004 (age 22)	(Scotland) Edinburgh	Scotland
Yoan Tanga	Back row	20 November 1996 (age 30)	(France) Stade Français Paris	France
**Santiago Arata**	Scrum-half	2 September 1996 (age 30)	(France) Castres Olympique	Uruguay
Faf de Klerk	Scrum-half	19 October 1991 (age 35)	(Japan) Yokohama Canon Eagles	South Africa
TJ Perenara	Scrum-half	23 January 1992 (age 34)	(Japan) Black Rams Tokyo	New Zealand
Tomás Albornoz	Fly-half	17 September 1997 (age 29)	(France) Toulon	Argentina
Harry Plummer	Fly-half	19 June 1998 (age 28)	(France) Clermont	New Zealand
Tuidraki Samusamuvodre	Centre	16 February 1998 (age 28)	(Fiji) Fijian Drua	Fiji
**Virimi Vakatawa**	Centre	1 May 1992 (age 34)	(Fiji) Fijian Drua	France
Alex Nankivell	Centre	25 October 1996 (age 30)	(Ireland) Munster	New Zealand
Jeremy Ward	Centre	20 January 1996 (age 30)	(France) Stade Français Paris	South Africa
**Andrew Kellaway**	Wing	12 October 1995 (age 31)	(Australia) Waratahs	Australia
George North	Wing	13 April 1992 (age 34)	Retired	Wales
Duhan van der Merwe	Wing	4 June 1995 (age 31)	(Scotland) Edinburgh	Scotland
Warrick Gelant	Fullback	20 May 1995 (age 31)	(South Africa) Stormers	South Africa
Tom Spring	Fullback	26 September 2002 (age 24)	(France) Bayonne	France

== Presidents ==
The club's current president is former England and Barbarians player John Spencer, who was named in the position in December 2019.

The office was first instituted in 1913. The previous six presidents were:

- W. P. Carpmael, held office 1913–1936; the founder of the Barbarians
- Emile de Lissa, 1936–1955; associated as Secretary, Treasurer, vice-president and President from 1901 to 1955
- Jack "Haigho" Smith, 1955; his term lasted for only a few weeks before his death, having previously given devoted service as Honorary Secretary for more than 30 years.
- Brigadier Glyn Hughes, 1955–1973
- Herbert Waddell, 1973–1988
- Micky Steele-Bodger, 1988–2019

== Honours ==
- Middlesex Sevens
  - Champions (3): 1934, 1997, 1998
- Hong Kong Sevens
  - Champions (1): 1981
- Melrose Sevens
  - Champions (1): 2001

== See also ==
- Australian Barbarians
- French Barbarians
- New Zealand Barbarians
- South African Barbarians
- World XV
- Nomads Women

== Bibliography ==
- Starmer-Smith, Nigel (1977). The Barbarians. Macdonald & Jane's Publishers. ISBN 0-86007-552-4.
- Evans, Alan (2005), The Barbarians, the United Nations of Rugby, with a foreword by Sir Anthony O'Reilly, Mainstream Publishing Company, Edinburgh ISBN 1-84018-970-3
