= History of rugby union matches between New Zealand and the Barbarians =

New Zealand and the Barbarians have played each other 11 times. The first encounter was in February 1954 and saw New Zealand win 19–5 at Cardiff Arms Park, while the last was in November 2017, when New Zealand won 31–22 at Twickenham. All the matches have been played at Cardiff Arms Park or Twickenham. New Zealand have won 8 of the 11 matches.

== Overall summary ==
Details	Played	Won by New Zealand	Won by Barbarians	Drawn	New Zealand points	Barbarians points
Neutral venue	11	8	2	1	250	154
Overall	11	8	2	1	250	154

== Matches ==
Date	Venue	Score	Winner	Comments
20 February 1954	Cardiff Arms Park, Cardiff	5–19	New Zealand	
15 February 1964	Cardiff Arms Park, Cardiff	3–36	New Zealand	
16 December 1967	Twickenham, London	6–11	New Zealand	
27 January 1973	Cardiff Arms Park, Cardiff	23–11	Barbarians	Featured The greatest try ever scored
30 November 1974	Twickenham, London	13–13	Draw	
16 December 1978	Cardiff Arms Park, Cardiff	16–18	New Zealand	
25 November 1989	Twickenham, London	10–21	New Zealand	
4 December 1993	Cardiff Arms Park, Cardiff	12–25	New Zealand	
4 December 2004	Twickenham, London	19–47	New Zealand	2004 end of year test
5 December 2009	Twickenham, London	25–18	Barbarians	2009 end of year test
4 November 2017	Twickenham, London	22–31	New Zealand	2017 end of year test
