= History of rugby union matches between Scotland and the Barbarians =

Scotland and the Barbarians have played each other on 11 occasions. The Barbarians have won eight matches, Scotland two and one match drawn. All but one of the matches have been played at Murrayfield, Edinburgh, the home of Scottish rugby.

== Overall summary ==
Details	Played	Won by Scotland	Won by Barbarians	Drawn	Scotland points	Barbarians points
In Scotland	11	2	8	1	143	379
Neutral venue	0	0	0	0	0	0
Overall	11	2	8	1	343	379

== Matches ==
Date	Venue	Score	Victor
9 May 1970	Murrayfield, Edinburgh	17–33	Barbarians
26 March 1983	Murrayfield, Edinburgh	13–26	Barbarians
7 September 1991	Murrayfield, Edinburgh	16–16	Draw
17 August 1996	Murrayfield, Edinburgh	44–48	Barbarians
31 May 2000	Murrayfield, Edinburgh	42–45	Barbarians
24 May 2001	Murrayfield, Edinburgh	31–74	Barbarians
1 June 2002	Murrayfield, Edinburgh	27–47	Barbarians
28 May 2003	Murrayfield, Edinburgh	15–24	Barbarians
22 May 2004	Murrayfield, Edinburgh	33–40	Barbarians
24 May 2005	Pittodrie, Aberdeen	38–7	Scotland
31 May 2006	Murrayfield, Edinburgh	66–19	Scotland
