= History of rugby union matches between Ireland and the Barbarians =

Ireland and the Barbarians have played each other six times to date. The Barbarians have won five of these matches while Ireland has only won once. Ireland's sole victory came in 2008 by a score of 39–14. The most recent encounter between the two teams was during the 2015 mid-year rugby union internationals, with the Barbarians winning by a score of 22–21. Three of the Barbarians' victories, in 2000, 2012 and 2015, have been by a single point.

== Summary ==
=== Overall ===
| Details | Played | Won by Ireland | Won by Barbarians | Drawn | Ireland points | Barbarians points |
|---|---|---|---|---|---|---|
| In Ireland | 4 | 0 | 4 | 0 | 112 | 152 |
| Neutral venue | 2 | 1 | 1 | 0 | 67 | 43 |
| Overall | 6 | 1 | 5 | 0 | 179 | 195 |

=== Records ===
Note: Date shown in brackets indicates when the record was or last set.

| Record | Barbarians | Ireland |
|---|---|---|
| Longest winning streak | 3 (4 Jun 2010–present) | 1 (27 May 2008) |
Largest points for
| Home/Neutral | 29 (29 May 2012) | 38 (18 May 1996) |
| Away | 70 (18 May 1996) | 39 (27 May 2008) |
Largest winning margin
| Home/Neutral | 1 (29 May 2012) | — |
| Away | 32 (18 May 1996) | 25 (27 May 2008) |

=== Attendance ===
Up to date as of 12 September 2023

| Total attendance* | 95,365 |
| Average attendance* | 19,073 |
| Highest attendance | 25,600; Ireland 23–29 Barbarians; 4 June 2010 |
*Excludes one match in which no attendance was reported

== Matches ==
| Date | Venue | Score | Victor | Comments | Match Report | Attendance |
|---|---|---|---|---|---|---|
| 18 May 1996 | Lansdowne Road, Dublin | 38–70 | Barbarians | Peace International | | 30,000 |
| 28 May 2000 | Lansdowne Road, Dublin | 30–31 | Barbarians | | | |
| 27 May 2008 | Kingsholm Stadium, Gloucester | 14–39 | Ireland | 2008 mid-year match | | 12,000 |
| 4 June 2010 | Thomond Park, Limerick | 23–29 | Barbarians | 2010 mid-year match | | 25,600 |
| 29 May 2012 | Kingsholm Stadium, Gloucester | 29–28 | Barbarians | 2012 mid-year match | | 11,654 |
| 28 May 2015 | Thomond Park, Limerick | 21–22 | Barbarians | 2015 mid-year match | | 16,111 |
