= Kilik =

Kilik may refer to:

- Kilik (Air Gear), a character in the Air Gear anime/manga series
- Kilik (Soul Calibur), a character in the Soulcalibur video game series
- Kilik Pass, a mountain pass between China and Pakistan

== See also ==
- Killik (disambiguation)
