= Hamilton Smith (cricketer) =

English cricketer

Personal information
- Full name: Hamilton Augustus Haigh Smith
- Born: 21 October 1884; Sandown, Isle of Wight, England
- Died: 28 October 1955 (aged 71); Paddington, London, England
- Batting: Right-handed
- Bowling: Leg break googly

Domestic team information
- Years: Team
- 1909–1914: Hampshire

Career statistics
| Competition | First-class |
|---|---|
| Matches | 27 |
| Runs scored | 327 |
| Batting average | 10.54 |
| 100s/50s | –/– |
| Top score | 43* |
| Balls bowled | 759 |
| Wickets | 14 |
| Bowling average | 41.00 |
| 5 wickets in innings | – |
| 10 wickets in match | – |
| Best bowling | 3/95 |
| Catches/stumpings | 9/– |
- Source: Cricinfo, 29 January 2010

Hamilton Augustus Haigh Smith (21 October 1884 – 28 October 1955) was an English first-class cricketer, rugby union player and administrator.

The son of Augustus Smith, he was born on the Isle of Wight at Sandown in October 1884. Smith was educated at Marlborough College, where he played for the college rugby union team. Following the completion of his education, Smith joined the Hampshire Regiment as a second lieutenant in July 1903. He was promoted to lieutenant in July 1904, before resigning his commission in the regiment in May 1908. He made his debut in first-class cricket for Hampshire against Somerset at Southampton in the 1908 County Championship. He played intermittently for Hampshire over the next six seasons, making 27 appearances. In these matches, he scored 327 runs at an average 10.54, with a highest score of 43 not out. With his leg break googly bowling, Smith took 14 wickets at a bowling average of exactly 41, with best figures of 3 for 95. Smith also played minor matches for Hampshire, touring Ireland in 1909 and 1911 and playing matches against Woodbrook Club and Ground and Dublin University.

Smith returned to the Hampshire Regiment as a second lieutenant in August 1914, at the beginning of the First World War. In October 1914, he was made a temporary lieutenant, before being promoted to captain in May 1915. After the war, Smith served as Honorary Secretary of Barbarians Rugby Football Club for more than 30 years and in the last few weeks of his life serving as club president. In his early days he was a keen rugby union player, representing Blackheath F.C., Trojans and the Barbarians, while at county level he played for Hampshire. He was the assistant-manager of the British Lions tour to South Africa in 1938. He returned to military service during the Second World War with the Royal Army Service Corps, and was associated with the Army Sport Control Board from 1942 to 1945. Smith died at Paddington in October 1955.
