= Edward Speyer =

German-born patron of music (1839–1934)

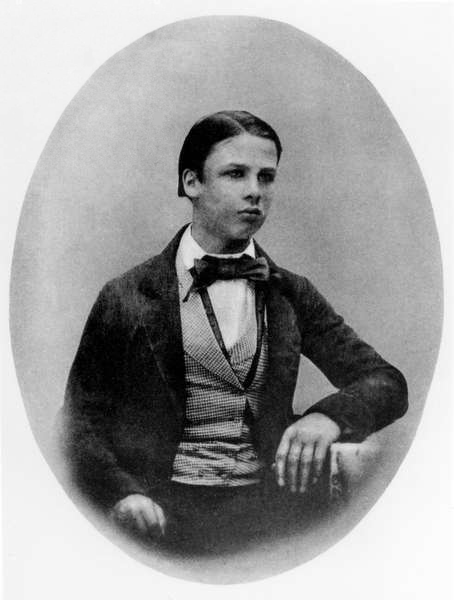
- Speyer at age 15
- Born: 14 May 1839; Frankfurt
- Died: 8 January 1934 (aged 94); Shenley, England

Edward Speyer (14 May 1839 – 8 January 1934) was a German-born banker and patron of music in London.

== Biography ==
Edward Speyer was born on 14 May 1839 in Frankfurt. His father was Wilhelm Speyer, a Jewish merchant from Frankfurt and amateur composer who was a friend of Carl Maria von Weber, Louis Spohr, Franz Liszt, Giacomo Meyerbeer, and Gioachino Rossini. Edward settled in London in 1859, and either became a naturalized subject in 1869 or 1885. In London, he became a distinguished patron of musical performances. Speyer's first wife was Helen Franziska Forsboom, with whom he had would have his first daughter Lalla Vandervelde. His second wife was Antonia Kufferath, a concert singer. Speyer died in 1934 in Shenley, England.

== Bibliography ==
- Speyer, Edward (1937). Edward Speyer: My Life and Friends. Cobden-Sanderson.
