= John Koren =

American statistician

John Koren (March 3, 1861 in Decorah, Iowa–1923) was an American clergyman and statistician.

== Education and career ==
John Koren was born in Iowa as one of nine children of the Norwegian-American church leader Ulrik Vilhelm Koren. He was an 1879 graduate of Luther College in Decorah, Iowa, and an 1882 graduate of Concordia Seminary in St. Louis, Missouri, with a degree in divinity. Most of his later life, he spent in public service as a government employee for the U.S. Department of Labor, the U.S. Bureau of the Census, and the City of Boston's statistics department.

As a statistician, Koren's interests lay in social welfare and the description of societal problems, e.g. prison inhabitants, crimes, and alcoholism.

Koren served as president of the American Statistical Association in 1913–14. To commemorate the 75th anniversary of this association in 1914, he edited a book about the history of official statistics in various countries. The volume was delayed due to World War I and was finally published in 1918.

In 1923, shortly before his death, Koren completed a concise history of the City of Boston, Massachusetts, at the occasion of the centennial celebration of the city. He committed suicide by jumping overboard the Holland-America liner Nieuw Amsterdam.

== Recognition ==
He was named a Fellow of the American Statistical Association in 1914.
