= Emile de Lissa =

Australian rugby union player

- Born: Emile Ernest Vere de Lissa; 30 January 1871 Sydney, Australia
- Died: 16 August 1955 (aged 84)
- School: Sydney Grammar School; University College School

Rugby union career
- Position: unknown
Senior career
Years	Team	Apps	(Points)
- Blackheath F.C.

Emile Ernest Vere de Lissa (30 January 1871 – 16 August 1955) was a British rugby union official who became the second president of the Barbarians.

== Personal history ==
De Lissa was born in Sydney, Australia in 1871 and was educated at Sydney Grammar School. At around the age of 11 his family moved to England, continuing his schooling at University College School. He was a keen sportsman, and although he was a member of Blackheath F.C., he was not a player of note and his career was ended by a foot injury followed by a long sojourn to Germany. De Lissa also played croquet and won the Croquet Association Silver Medal in 1909, and was selected as one of the country's ten best players when he was entered for the Beddow Cup in 1923.

== Bibliography ==
- Starmer-Smith, Nigel (1977). The Barbarians. Macdonald & Jane's Publishers. ISBN 0-86007-552-4.
