= International Penal and Penitentiary Foundation =

Swiss foundation

- Abbreviation: IPPF, FIPP
- Predecessor: International Penal and Penitentiary Commission
- Formation: 1950; 76 years ago
- Founded at: Bern, Switzerland
- Type: IGO, NGO
- Legal status: Foundation
- Purpose: Promotes studies in the field of the prevention of crime and the treatment of offenders
- Headquarters: Bern, Switzerland
- Region served: Worldwide
- Methods: Scientific research, publications and teaching
- Fields: Prison reform, Prisoners' rights, Human rights
- Members: 25 Member States (2024)
- Secretary General: Mary Rogan
- President: Stephen Shute
- Main organ: Council of the Foundation
- Website: https://www.ippf-fipp.org/

The International Penal and Penitentiary Foundation (IPPF; French: Fondation internationale pénale et pénitentiaire, FIPP) is an international organisation with quasi-governmental status. It promotes studies on crime-prevention and treatment of offenders, focussing on research, publications and teaching. It has been approved by the General Assembly of the United Nations and holds consultative status at the United Nations and the Council of Europe.

== History ==
The IPPF can trace its origin to 1872, when the International Prison Commission (according to some sources the International Penitentiary Commission) was set up to make recommendations for prison reform. This commission later became the International Penal and Penitentiary Commission (IPPC) and is considered the oldest intergovernmental agency in the correctional field. The IPPC was affiliated with the League of Nations and organised conferences on crime control every five years.

It produced the first set of minimum rules for the treatment of detainees (the Standard Minimum Rules for the Treatment of Prisoners), which were adopted by the League of Nations in 1934 and approved in 1955 at the first United Nations Congress on Crime Prevention and the Treatment of Offenders.

After World War II, the IPPC was dissolved and its role transferred to the United Nations. The International Penal and Penitentiary Foundation in its current form was established in 1950 as a foundation officially based in Switzerland, and has been approved by the General Assembly of the United Nations.

== Current role ==
The IPPF promotes studies on crime-prevention and treatment of offenders through research, publications, teaching and international meetings. The IPPF's members are experts in penal and penitentiary matters from around the world such as judges, officials in the prison system, and academics.

The IPPF holds consultative status at the UN Commission on Crime Prevention and Criminal Justice, the United Nations Economic and Social Council, and the Council of Europe. It provides recommendations and advice on safeguarding human rights and improving treatment under the penal system. Among its current priorities are a revision of minimum rules for the treatment of prisoners for Latin America and the Caribbean, and prison policy and prisoners' rights.

== Organs ==
=== Council of the Foundation (IPPF Board) ===
The Council is the supreme body of the IPPF and is responsible for its administration. The Council also represents the Foundation with respect to third parties. It is composed of five members:

- Prof Stephen Shute, President
- Dr Mary Rogan, Secretary-General
- Dr Veronique Jaquier Erard, Treasurer
- Prof Dr José Luis Díez Ripollés, Vice President
- Arch. Alejo García Basalo, Vice President

=== Committees ===
The work of the IPPF is split among three committees whose members are persons who have distinguished themselves in the field of crime prevention and the treatment of offenders. The Committees are as follow:

The Principal Committee (1st Committee)

- This Committee comprises 75 seats and plays an advisory and consultative role with respect to the Council on the activities of the Foundation
- Members of this Committee must come from one of the 25 Member States that were represented on the IPPC (see below)
- There can be a maximum of three members from each member state on this Committee

The Associates Committee (2nd Committee)

- This Committee comprises not more than 75 seats and plays an advisory and consultative role on subjects submitted to it by the Council related to the Foundation's activities
- Members of this Committee are: a) from a non-member country; or b) are affiliated with a public or private international organisation that is relevant to the field of crime prevention and the treatment of offenders
- There can be a maximum of three members from each non-member country or organization on this Committee

The Fellows Committee (3rd Committee)

- This Committee comprises an unlimited number of seats and plays an advisory and consultative role on subjects submitted to it by the Council relative to the Foundation’s activities
- Members of this Committee are former members of the Principal or Associates Committees who have expressed a wish to stay involved in the work of the Foundation

=== Auditing body ===
The Council appoints this external and independent body to audit the accounts of the Foundation and the submit a detailed report to the Council for its approval. This body has the authority to report any defects it discovers to external surveillance authorities if the Council does not rectify them in a reasonable time.

== Members ==
The following countries were original members of the IPPC, and as such are granted the right to be represented in the First Committee:

Argentina	Austria	Belgium	Chile	Denmark
Egypt	Finland	France	Germany	Hungary
Ireland	Italy	Japan	Luxembourg	Norway
The Netherlands	New Zealand	Poland	Portugal	South Africa
Spain	Sweden	Switzerland	United Kingdom	United States of America
