= Killik & Co =

- Type: Independent partnership
- Industry: Financial services
- Founded: 1989
- Founder: Paul Killik (co-founder Matthew Orr)
- Headquarters: London, United Kingdom
- Area served: United Kingdom
- Products: Financial advice, wealth management
- Website: killik.com

Killik & Co is an independently-owned, award-winning wealth management Partnership, providing saving, planning and investment advice to retail clients throughout the UK. In addition to its Mayfair headquarters, Killik & Co has a network of high street branches across the UK. As of 2025, the company manages assets on behalf of over 27,000 clients across the UK.

Killik & Co's services include advised and managed investing, wealth planning, will writing and tax and trusts advice.

== History ==
Killik & Co was founded on the 30th January 1989 as a stockbroking firm by entrepreneurs Paul Killik and Matthew Orr, moving its head office to Grosvenor Street in Mayfair in 2000. It is one of the few remaining independently-owned Partnerships in the UK retail investing market, following consolidation amongst European, Japanese and American investment banks after the Big Bang in the late 1980s.

Killik & Co is headquartered on Grosvenor Street, Mayfair, with high street branches in Hampstead and Kensington. In addition to its branches, Killik & Co runs a network of Houses of Killik - modern spaces built to meet the financial needs of families, where a "no appointment necessary" philosophy allows investors at any stage to initiate a conversation about their personal finances with a professional.

In 2024, Killik & Co was awarded a B Corp certification.

In 2024, Paul Killik became Senior Partner & Chairman of Killik & Co, appointing Sarah Threadgould and Clem MacTaggart as Managing Partners. Georgie Killik became Deputy Senior Partner & Chief Strategy Officer.

== Awards ==
The company is consistently award-winning, its most recent accolades being:

Investors' Chronicle & Financial Times 2024: Wealth Manager, Selective ISA Provider, Selective SIPP Provider, Selective Platform, Stockbroker

City of London Wealth Management Awards 2025: Family Office of the Year

Investors' Chronicle & Financial Times 2023: Best Full SIPP Provider, Best Discretionary / Advisory Service

City of London Wealth Management Awards 2024: Best Advisory Service, Family Office of the Year
