= Timeline of the Jallianwala Bagh massacre =

The following timeline presents a chronological overview of the key events before, during, and immediately after the Jallianwala Bagh massacre in Amritsar, India, on 13 April 1919, collectively known as the Punjab disturbances.

An early chronology is published in appendix I of the first Hunter Committee report to Edwin Montagu on 8 March 1920.

== Early 1919 ==
According to Lieutenant Governor of Punjab since 1913, Sir Michael O’Dwyer, the World War 1 recruitment quota increased from one man in every 150 in 1917 to one in every 44 in 1918 in Gujranwala alone. In April 1919, the chief cities involved in the disturbances in Punjab include Amritsar, with a population of 160,000, Lahore, with 250,000, Gujranwala, at 30,000, Kasur, with 24,000, Wazirabad, at 10,000-15,000, and Lyallpur, at 15,000, in addition to several villages including Akalgarh, Chuhar Kara, Gojra, Hafizabad, Jalalpur Jattan, Malawakal, Manianwala, Moman, Nawan Pind, Patti and Kem Karn, Ramnagar, Sangla Hill, Sheikupura, and Tarn Taran, all with a combined population of under 10,000.

Date	Notes
6 February - 21 March 1919	Rowlatt Act passed by the Imperial Legislative Council on the recommendation of the Sedition Committee. (Note: Intended to extend wartime emergency powers on the basis of a perceived threat from revolutionary nationalism in India, enabling authorities to suppress political opposition by restricting or deporting influential Indian leaders.); Saifuddin Kitchlew, a lawyer, and Satyapal, a physician, emerge as key leaders in Amritsar, opposing the Rowlatt Bill and anticipated Turkish peace terms, and join Gandhi's civil disobedience movement through the proposed satyagraha vow. Following two years of absence from Punjab, Miles Irving is newly appointed Deputy Commissioner of Amritsar.
1 March 1919	Gandhi publishes a pledge to "refuse civilly to obey these [Rowlatt] laws", and calls for a nationwide complete cessation of economic activity.
23 March 1919	Gandhi calls for a nationwide hartal to be held on 6 April.
29 March 1919	Kitchlew and Satyapal address a crowd with proposals of non-violent passive resistance.
29 March 1919	11 a.m.: Satyapal is issued with a Punjab Government order under the 1915 Defence of India Act prohibiting him from speaking at public meetings or leaving Amritsar.

== 30 March - 6 April 1919 ==
According to volume six of the unpublished 1920 British inquiry into the disorders, roughly one-third of all hartals against the Rowlatt Act in India between 30 March and 6 April 1919 took place in Punjab. (Note: Volumes VI and VIII of the Hunter Inquiry Report were not published for wide viewing, but appeared at the O'Dwyer vs Nair trial in 1924 when C. Sankaran Nair brought them to court. They contain several testimonies taken in camera. Volume VI contains oral evidence of J. P. Thompson and Michael O'Dwyer, written statements of the Punjab Government and Michael O'Dwyer, and evidence of Malik Umar Hayat Khan. Volume VII contains the confidential evidence of the Government of India and of Sir Havelock Hudson. Publishing parts was not considered as it was felt that may cause people to pressure the release of the full documents.) On 30 March, hartals are carried out in Amritsar and Multan for the whole day, and partially at Fazilka and Panipat. The Arya Samaj party secured hartals in Mukerian and Kot Adu, and hartal posters are reported at Karnal. At Mukerian, the hartal is stopped following orders by the District Commissioner.

=== 30 March - 4 April ===
Date	Time	Notes
30 March (Sunday)	Afternoon	Hartal and meeting at Amritsar led by Kitchlew at Jallianwala Bagh passes peacefully. (Note: By this time, satyagraha committees had formed in different parts of India.) Chaired by Kitchlew, other speakers include Kotu Mal, Swami Anubhavanand, and Dina Nath, and Satyapal remains silent. The meeting is recorded by CID. During the hartal in Delhi, scuffles break out between appx. 1 p.m. and 2.30 p.m. Around eight people are killed, and around a dozen injured. Reginald Dyer, then commanding 45th (Jalandhar) Brigade drives through Delhi.
31 March		Hartal planning meeting held at Sialkot. Kitchlew and Dina Nath address a mass meeting at Jalandhar, and women anti-Rowlatt protestors hold a meeting at Ludhiana.
2 April		Hartal planning meeting held at Ambala. Swami Satya Deo visits Amritsar to cascade a message from Gandhi to preach non-violence ("soul force") for an upcoming hartal on 6 April. Kitchlew and Dina Nath address a meeting at Jalandhar. Superintendent of police at Lahore bans street processions for one month.
3 April		Hartal planning meetings held at Rupar, Batala, Gurdaspur, Rewari, Hoshiarpur, Ludhiana, and Sialkot.
4 April		O'Dwyer applies for Gandhi to be deported to Burma under Regulation III of 1818. Kitchlew, Kotu Mal, Dina Nath, and Swami Anubhavanand are issued with a Punjab Government order (dated 3 April) under the Defence of India Act, prohibiting them from speaking at public meetings or leaving Amritsar. Hartal planning meetings held at Hoshiarpur, Lahore, Karnal, and Sialkot.

=== 5 - 6 April ===
On 5 April hartal planning meetings are held at Amritsar, Jampur, Ferozepore, Gujranwala, Hafizabad, Hoshiarpur, Lahore, Ludhiana, Lyallpur, Montgomery, and Karnal. Aubrey J. O'Brien, Deputy Commissioner at Gujranwala, tells the meeting organisers in his district that resulting violence would lead to arrests.

Date	Time	Notes
5 April	Afternoon	Amritsar Congress Committee agree a hartal for the next day. Irving receives intelligence that the planned hartal for the 6th is not taking place.
5 April	5 p.m.	Hans Raj, Kitchlew and other Satyagrahis are at Amritsar's Aitchison Park watching cricket, when they decide that the hartal for the next day will take place.
5 April	Late evening	Hans Raj and others walk through the streets of Amritsar beating a drum to announce a hartal for the following day. Irving notes feeling betrayed by the intelligence he received from the Khan Bahadurs and Rai Sahibs. (Note: Indians with honorific titles who by 1919 were generally out of touch with common politics and the general population.)
6 April (Sunday)	Early morning	The garrison at Jalandhar dispatches Indian troops to Amritsar, giving the city a significant military presence with pickets at the railway station and outside the banks. Armed soldiers line the route from the European quarters to the church.
6 April (Sunday)	Afternoon	Wife of Khalsa College's Principal Gerard Wathen, Melicent Wathen, notes in her diary rumours of an imminent rebellion and they decide to bring forward their summer break to the hills. Hartal passes peacefully. Indian barrister Badrul Islam Ali Khan addresses a meeting of 50,000 delegates at Jallianwala Bagh, passing a resolution to revoke the orders issued to Kitchlew and Satyapal.

== 8 - 9 April 1919 ==
Date	Time	Notes
8 April		Convinced that Kitchlew and Satyapal are part of a larger conspiracy, Irving writes to his superior, Commissioner of the division of Lahore, A. J. W. Kitchin, requesting a larger military presence.
9 April		Government of India informs O’Dwyer that Gandhi would not be deported, but his activities would be confined to Bombay. A copy of Irving's letter dated 8 April and addressed to Kitchin reaches O’Dwyer.
9 April		O’Dwyer consults with civil surgeon Lt.-Col. Henry Smith who had come from Amritsar, about the likely impact of deporting the political leaders Kitchlew and Satyapal, and is assured that it would not provoke any disturbance. Hartal, largely organised by Satyapaal, Kitchlew, Dr. Bashir, and Hans Raj, on Ram Naumi passes peacefully. Irving watches it from the porch of the Allahabad Bank and notes that the crowds played him "God Save the King", in addition to chanting for Kitchlew, Satyapal and Gandhi.
9 April	7 p.m/Evening	Irving receives a letter from O'Dwyer ordering the removal of Kitchlew and Satyapal to the furthest end of Punjab. Irving holds a meeting at his house with Superintendent of police in Punjab, John F. Rehill, Deputy Superintendent of police, Plomer, officer commanding the military station at Amritsar, Captain J. W. Massey, and Smith.
9 April	8.30 p.m.	On his way to Amritsar, at Kosi Kalan, near Delhi, Gandhi is given an order dated 4 April requesting that he does not enter Punjab. He carries on and reaching Palwal, he is arrested and taken to Mathura and then back to Bombay.

== 10 April 1919 ==
Date	Time	Notes
10 April	8 a.m.	At the instruction of O'Dwyer, Irving summons Kitchlew and Satyapal to his residence for 10 a.m.
10 April	10 a.m.	Kitchlew, Hans Raj, and Jai Ram Singh arrive at Irving's house, followed shortly by Satyapal. The two leaders are met by Irving, Rehill, and Assistant Commissioner Ronald B. Beckett, and are secretly arrested under the Defence of India Act 1915 while Hans Raj and Singh wait outside with the Somerset Light Infantry on guard.
10 April	10.30 a.m.	Rehill, drives Satyapal and Kitchlew to Dharamshala. Massey arranges pickets at key entry points to Amritsar's European quarters; Rego Bridge, Hall Gate Bridge, and the Hospital level crossing. (Note: At the start of the day (10 April) the garrison at Amritsar consisted of one company of Somerset Light Infantry commanded by Massey, half a company of garrison artillary, and the 12th Ammunition column commanded by Captain John T. Botting.)
10 April	11 a.m.	Around half an hour after Rehill leaves Irving's house, Irving instructs Hans Raj and Singh to deliver letters from the two leaders to their families, after which they proceed to Bashir's residence.
10 April	11.30 a.m.	The annual horse and cattle market result in a larger than usual crowd in Amritsar. Bashir instructs Hans Raj and Jai Singh to visit the telegraph office to inform the Press, Gandhi, and the Satygraha Committee in Bombay, before calling for a city-wide hartal, and informing the local leaders Ratto and Bugga, who gather a large unarmed crowd. News of the deportation spreads rapidly through the city, shops close, and crowds gather, with a large procession forming in Hall Bazaar.
10 April	12 p.m. - 12.45 p.m. (appx.)	Unarmed, head shaven, and barefoot procession heads towards Hall Bridge and Irving's house with the aim of delivering an oral petition (faryad) to Irving to bring their leaders back. They pass the police station without trouble. Unharmed Mr Stewart and Mr Scott are seen at the National Bank, before the crowd approach Hall Gate. Beckett and his officers attempt to hold the civil lines as the procession advances, with some in the crowd agitating the horses. The civilians at the front sit down and beat their chests. An officer opens fire, and some in the crowds pick up stones and rubble and throw them at the officers. (Note: Extra military later arrive from Lahore with one company from the 2-6th Sussex Regiment and a company of the 1-124th Baluchis, commanded by Major Donald. Other troops include 2nd Lancers commanded by Captain Macmillan, and the 25th Londons from Jalandhar.)
10 April	1-5 p.m.	Plomer arrives at the foot-bridge and road-bridge with 24 policemen and seven horse-mounted soldiers. Casualties are noted outside Madan's shop. Around 36m away, armed police position themselves. Two local lawyers successfully disperse the crowd towards the Telegraph Office. The peaceful crowd that was seen approaching Hall Gate are seen returning to the city with lathis and shouting that "they have killed two of us". In addition to the Hall gate crowds, groups of people approaching the city include crowds coming through Hathi Gate, Logarh Gate, and Aithinson Park. Between 1 p.m. and 1.30 p.m. the post office in the Town Hall is demolished, followed by further damage to the Town Hall. Stewart and Scott are beaten and burnt, and the National Bank is looted and destroyed. Mr Thomson of the Alliance Bank shoots his revolver at the crowd, kills some before being thrown onto the road and killed, followed by the burning of the Bank. (Note: Other Europeans killed on 10 April were the cantonement electrician, Sargeant Rowlands, and the railway guard and ex-Northumberland fusilier, Robinson.); Crowd moves to the Chartered Bank, where the police rescue J. W. Thomson and Mr Ross, who then with other rescued Europeans stay at the police station until midnight. At 1.30 p.m. Irving sends a telegram to Kitchin. At around 1.30pm lady physician to the Zenana Hospital, Mary Easdon, avoids capture by hiding in a toilet and at around 3.40pm escapes disguised in a burkha. Between 1 p.m. and 2 p.m. Captain Gerald Philip Crampton, Lieutenant Frank McCallum, and 260 unarmed Gurkhas, en route to Peshawar from Dehradun, make a stop at the train station in Amritsar. There, 100 of his men are issued rifles from the Fort. Marcella Sherwood, an English missionary with the Church of England Zenana Missionary Society, is assaulted. She is rescued by Lala Halvai and friends and hidden in Badri Nath's old haveli. By 2 p.m. all the telegraph wires out of Amritsar had been cut and Mr Robinson of the telegraph office was dead. 3.30 p.m. news of the days events reach Lahore. By 4 p.m., European women and children arrive at the Fort.
10 April	At 4 p.m.	Dyer receives a coded message from Amritsar requesting military aid including guns and an aeroplane.
10 April	4.30 - 5 p.m.	Police arrive at the Alliance Bank.
10 April	5 p.m.	Kitchin, arrives at Amritsar from Lahore by car, accompanied by Deputy Inspector General of Provincial Police, Douglas Donald. (Note: Furneaux cites Deputy Inspector General of Police Central Range, C. G. Farquhar, as accompanying Kitchin.)
10 April	6.30pm	Captain Jarad of the recruiting office has congregated women and children at the residence of Mr Jeffries.
10 April	7 p.m.	Melicent Wathen notes in her diary that an aeroplane arrived at 7 p.m.
10 April	8 p.m. onward	Kitchin and Douglas arrive at the railway station. Irving is informed that Dyer is to send 400 men from Jalandhar later that night. Irving requests reinforcements and briefs Kitchin on the day's events, in the presence of Massey, Rehill, Donald and Plomer. Kitchin assumes charge over civil and military control.
10 April	10 p.m. - 11 p.m.	181 men of the 1/124th Baluchis and 130 men of the 2/6th Royal Sussex Regiment, commanded by Major MacDonald, arrive at Amritsar train station. There, without written orders, reference to higher authority, or informing Irving, Kitchin replaces Massey with MacDonald to be in charge of both civil and military control of Amritsar, and gives him permission to act as he sees fit. Martial law is assumed without proclamation.
10 April	Midnight (appx.)	MacDonald, Plomer and the Sussex Regiment march down Hall Bazaar to the police station, from where they meet the rescued Europeans.

== 11 April 1919 ==
Date	Time	Notes
11 April	1 a.m.	Easdon arrives at the Fort. 100 British and 200 Indian troops arrive at Amritsar from Jalandhar in the early hours.
11 April	1.30 a.m.	Rescued Europeans at the police station arrive at the Fort; the men wearing turbans.
11 April	2 a.m.	2nd Lancers commanded by Captain Macmillan arrive at Amritsar.
11 April		At the request of Kitchin, M. H. L. Morgan, then based in Lahore, is selected and recruited by Sir William Beynon to take military command of Amritsar. O'Dwyer declines a proposal to meet with Indian leaders of the anti-Rowlett campaign.
11 April	Afternoon	The five Europeans who were killed on the 10th are buried
11 April	9 p.m.	Before Morgan reaches Amritsar, Dyer arrives there, accompanied by F. C. C. Briggs and Anderson. Dyer meets Irving and takes formal command of civil and military authority.

== 12 April 1919 ==
O'Brien is transferred from Gujranwala on 12 April 1919.

Date	Time	Notes
12 April	Early morning	Dyer marches through Amritsar with 50 troops.
12 April	10 a.m.	Observation by air reports a crowd of thousands at Sultanwind Gate. Dyer, Irving, and Massey take 125 British troops, 310 India troops, and two armoured vehicles to disperse the crowd of people returning from funerals. McCallum marches to the police station through roads covered in flowers.
12 April		Arrest of Bugga. McCallum is placed at the police station to supervise those arrested.
12 April	4 p.m.	Hans Raj arranges a meeting at the Hindu Sabha School, where it is announced that Lala Kanhaiya Lal will address a meeting on 13 April at Jallianwala Bagh.

== 13 April 1919 ==
The 16th Indian Division leaves Ferozepore 13 April and heads towards Amritsar.

Date	Time	Notes
13 April	9 a.m.	Dyer conducts a three-hour march through Amritsar, making 19 stops to proclaim a citywide curfew, excluding the areas of the Golden Temple and Jallianwala Bagh. He is accompanied by the mounted police officers Ashraf Khan and Obadullah, followed by Malik Farid Khan and the town crier, with a large military escort and senior officers Irving, Rehill, and Plomer travelling with him in open cars, and followed by two armoured vehicles. The procession sets out from the town hall, passes through Hall Bazaar and Hall Gate, follows the line of the western city wall, and concludes after several stops in the southwestern quarter of the city.
13 April	1 p.m.	Hans Raj sees to the completion of the sweeping of Jallianwala Bagh, arranges the platform construction and drinking water, and is noted to confer with two CID officers.
13 April	Before 4 p.m.	Hans Raj addresses the crowd from a makeshift platform, displaying a portrait of Kitchlew, calls for a repeal of the Rowlatt Act, and claims that those shot on 10 April had been unjustly killed while on their way to present a complaint to Irving. Brij Gopi Nath Bekal, a bank clerk, recites a poem expressing the people's grievances, followed by speeches from Dina Nath, editor of the local Waqt newspaper, and Dr Gurbaksh Rai. Two resolutions are passed; a call to repeal the Rowlatt Act, and a condemnation of the shootings on 10 April.
13 April	4 p.m. (appx.)	A funeral procession passes just before an aeroplane is seen flying above. Rehill informs Dyer that a meeting at Jallianwala Bagh is taking place, with at least 1,000 people already gathered. In addition to political speakers and holidaymakers, the crowd at the Bagh includes traders following the early closure of the annual horse and cattle fair, and local and village people who had come to celebrate Baisakhi.
13 April	4.15 p.m. (appx.)	Girdhari Lal and friends go to Ram Bagh to see Irving, who by now has left, and sees Rehill and Dyer's troops.
13 April	4.30 p.m. (appx.)	Dyer, Briggs, Morgan, and Dyer's two bodyguards, Anderson and Pizzey, travel in the same car to Jallianwala Bagh. In front are the Gurkhas, following the 54th Frontier Force and 59th Scinde Rifles. Behind Dyer is an armoured vehicle followed by a car with Plomer and Rehill in, and the second armoured vehicle at the rear. (Note: In Amritsar 1919 (2019) by historian Kim A. Wagner, Dyer's detachment is described as including 50 armed infantry, 25 from the 9th Gurkhas and 25 from the 54th Frontier Force and the 59th Scinde Rifles, mostly Baluchis or Pathans. The Gurkhas were mostly inexperienced, whereas the 54th had already seen action during the 10 April disturbances. The two armoured vehicles were from Lahore; a Napier, essentially an armoured lorry with a mounted Vickers machine gun, and a heavier, fully enclosed Jeffrey-Russell armoured car with a turret mounted Vickers. Both were manned by four person crews. Another 40 Gurkhas were armed with kukris.)
13 April	5 p.m. (appx.)	Durga Das Vaid, editor of Waqt, speaks after seven previous speakers. Girdhari Lal takes his position on an adjacent roof, becoming a key eyewitness.
13 April	5.05 p.m. (appx.)	On reaching the narrow entrance from Hathi Gate to Jallianwala Bagh, Dyer and his troops encounter a crowd of more than 20,000 unarmed civilians, and within about 30 seconds, without issuing a warning, he orders his men to open fire, while the armoured cars remain outside. Neither Plomer nor Rehill are in the Bagh at the onset of the firing. During the Jallianwala Bagh shooting, Plomer stands just to Dyer's left and Briggs to his right, with Anderson positioned a few paces behind and slightly to the right. The firing of approximately 1,650 rounds continues for around 10 minutes.
13 April	Between 5.20 p.m. and 8 p.m.	Khalsa College is visited by a squadron of 11th Lancers, who order remaining Europeans to move to Ram Bagh. There, Wathen and Dyer arrive almost simultaneously. Having escaped earlier, Lal Gian Chand returns to the Bagh to find his 17 year old nephew full of bullets and with a broken skull. Girdhari Lal clears the building of all those that have taken refuge there and visits the Bagh twice, noting that many lay dead in the adjoing streets. Attar Kaur, 25 year old pregnant resident of Amritsar, becomes an eyewitness to the aftermath when she goes to search for her husband, Bhag Mal Bhatia, and finds his dead body. Ratan Devi becomes an eyewitness to the aftermath and chooses to remain in the Bagh beside her dead husband beyond the 8 p.m. cufew. Irving arrives at Ram Bagh at around 7 p.m.
13 April	10 p.m.	Dyer visits his pickets accompanied by Morgan.
13 April	11.15 p.m.	Deputy Inspecter-General Police, Farquhar, phones J. P. Thompson in Lahore.
13 April	Midnight	Captain John T. Botting of the Royal Field Artillery and in charge of the Amritsar's permanent garrison, inspects the city and notes "their was not a soul about".

== 14 April 1919 ==
On 14 April 1919 Punjab officials seek compensation for Europeans affected by injury or property damage, relying on the revised Police Act, 1861, Police Act of 1881, which permits charges to be imposed on localities deemed responsible for disturbances. (Note: In 1861, the colonial government merged executive and police authority in India and required residents, under the Police Act, to cover the cost of extra policing during disturbances.) On the same day around 100 lawyers are ordered by Dyer to enrol as special constables to patrol streets, and report back at 10 a.m., 1 p.m., and 5 p.m.

Date	Time	Notes
14 April	1 a.m.	At Wathen's request, Irving writes a detailed letter to Kitchin and O'Dwyer, summarising Dyer's actions the day before. Wathen and civil servant Jacob drive to Lahore to deliver the letter.
14 April	3 a.m.	On reaching Lahore, Wathen meets with O'Dwyer, Kitchin, and J. P. Thompson. Kitchin is sent back to Amritsar.
14 April	7 a.m.	Police receive a report that a dead calf is hanging near the railway station at Gujranwala.
14 April	8 a.m.	Kitchin arrives in Amritsar to meet Dyer. Gurukul Bridge in Gujranwala is set on fire. Subsequently, shops close, crowds throw stones at a train arriving from Lahore, telegraph wires are cut and the bridge is set on fire.
14 April	11 a.m.	Police arrive at Gujranwala railway station, where Superintendent Heron shoots into the crowd. The crowd disperse and set fire to the post office. Europeans in Gujranwala are sheltered in the treasury.
14 April	12.30 p.m. - 1 p.m.	Having discussed and agreed with the potential use of aeroplanes with Beynon and Colonel Minchin two days earlier, O'Dwyer receives a situation report from Gujranwala and by 1.30 p.m. sends the recently transferred Aubrey J. O'Brien back to Gujranwala.
14 April	3 p.m.	Three Royal Air Force aircraft, piloted by Douglas Carbery, Oddie, and Second-Lieutenant Vincent, equipped with bombs and machine guns, drop bombs on Gujranwala, aiming at people in a farm, on a village road, in a school courtyard and boarding house, and in the town itself. Beynon receives Dyer's report on events from 11 to 13 April and, after consulting O’Dwyer by telephone, replies "your action correct," adding that the "Lieutenant Governor [O'Dwyer] approves". Carbery returns to Lahore around 3.50 p.m.
14 April	6 p.m.	2nd (Rawalpindi) Division War diary entry by Lieutenant Kirby notes he successfully fired at Gujranwala.
14 April	8.30 p.m.	Captain Harrison arrives at Gujranwala by train with the Durham Light Infantry.

== 15 April - 9 June 1919 ==
Martial law is introduced in Punjab at midnight between 15 and 16 April 1919, and backdated to 30 March 1919 on 21 April. Under martial law, whippings are undertaken at Lahore, Kasur, Chuharkam, Gujranwala, Gurat, and Amritsar. Other punishments carried out during some of this time include the orders to salute, fancy punishments, and orders to crawl. The streets of Amritsar are patrolled daily from 17 to 20 April. Telegraph wires are cut at Jalandhar on 17 and 18 April. Between 18 and 19 April, 86 arrests are made. On 21 April, 150 arrests are made. On 22 April, 75 year old Lala Kanhyalal Bhatia is ordered to carry out duties of a coolie. From 20 April to 24 April, people ordered to crawl through Kucha Kaurianwala include a pregnant woman, a blind man (Kahan Chand), and some who are disabled. 350 arrests are made by 30 April. In total, during the period of martial law, more than 600 people are detained or arrested without charge or trial. Of the known 573 detainees, 91 are imprisoned for between four weeks and 79 days, 134 for 14 to 28 days, 108 for 7 to 13 days, and 240 for less than one week.

Date	Time	Notes
15 April		A train with British troops and machine guns is sent from Lahore to Sheikhupura, where Indian defence force officer, Lala Sri Ram Sud, Extra assistant commissioner of Sheikhupura boards the train.
15 April	Midnight	Martial law introduced in Punjab at midnight between 15 and 16 April 1919.
16 April	Early morning	Lala Sri Ram Sud orders his troops to shoot its machine guns towards anyone it sees between Sheikhupura and Chuharkana.
16 April	Midnight	Civilians at Barhoa sever Shahdara-Lahore telegraph lines.
18 April		India Office issues a statement on the disturbances in Punjab. Gandhi suspends civil disobedience for the day. Irving issues an Urdu proclamation of the events in Amritsar, to date. (Note: This note was not disclosed to the later Hunter Committee.)
19 April		The Gurkhas are permitted to return to Peshawar.
19 April		Dyer visits Sherwood at the Fort. Administrative practiclities of martial law are completed by Major S. R. Shirley.
20 April		Dyer imposes the Crawling Order. Reginald Mortimer Howgego of the 25th Cyclist Battalion, known for his photographs, holds a picket at one end of Kucha Kaurianwala, where Sherwood was assaulted.
20 April		O'Dwyer travels with Kitchin to Amritsar.
21 April		Martial law backdated to 30 March 1919 by the Viceroy, Lord Chelmsford, at the request of O'Dwyer. Dyer, accompanied by Irving, set out to Gurdaspur with one of three mobile columns.
22 April	9 a.m.	Dyer's first column reaches Dhariwal, where five men are arrested, before heading on to Batala.
22 April	Evening	Dyer's column returns to Amritsar with the collected prisoners.
By 23 April		Malcolm Hailey assumes responsibility for writing the official Punjab Government report on the massacre, while simultaneously working on the Islington Commission report.
24 April		Crawling Order ends, after around 50 people having been forced to crawl through the lane.
25 April		Dyer relaxes curfew from 8 p.m. to 10 p.m.
26 April		30 men are arrested in Chheharta.
29 April		Dyer and Briggs are alerted to a large quantity of wooden sticks that have arrived at Amritsar train station.
22 May		Montagu contemplates setting up an enquiry.
26 May		O'Dwyer publishes a farewell note as he is to retire.
28 May		British parliamentarians debate the use of bombing and mass shootings in Punjab as they consider the level of force needed to sustain imperial rule in India.
31 May		Rabindranath Tagore writes to the British Viceroy condemning the massacre and renounces his knighthood, awarded in 1915 following his 1913 Nobel Prize in Literature.
9 June		Martial law ends.

== Post martial law (1919) ==
Date	Notes
18 June	Montagu telegrams the Viceroy insisting on an enquiry.
8 July	Letter read out in House of Commons by Sir W. Joyson-Hicks stating that Sherwood was "convinced that there was a real rebellion in the Punjab, and that General Dyer saved India and us from a repetition of the miseries and cruelties of 1857".
18 July	Kapil Deva Malaviya, journalist. for the Abhyudaya, visits the Bagh to begin writing reports.
25 August	Dyer submits his statement to Beynon.
19 September	Dyer's actions are considered at the Imperial Legislative Council meeting.
25 September	Indemnity Act, 1919, Act No. XXVII, receives the assent of the Governor-General.
11 October	Chelmsford receives official Punjab authorities report.
14 October	Disorders Inquiry Committee is appointed, with William Hunter as its chairman.
29 October	First hearing of Disorders Inquiry Committee.
12 November	Hunter Committee visits Amritsar.
19 November	Dyer appears before the Hunter Committee in Lahore.
23 November	Briggs dies at Bannu; in his possession are Dyer's personal notes on the massacre.
December	The crawling lane appears in a David Low cartoon in a British newspaper. J. C. Wedgewood brings up the massacre in the House of Commons on 22 December. There, he told the House that "In the ordinary English primer the only thing the ordinary person learns about British rule in India is about the Black Hole of Calcutta and the massacre of Cawnpore, where there was a well choked with corpses. Centuries hence you will find Indian children brought up to this spot. Just as they visit now the Cawnpore Well, and you can imagine the feelings of these Indians for generations over this terrible business".

== 1920 ==
In 1920 J. P. Thomson is furloughed to shield him from Indian nationalists. In the same year, while exiled in England, B. G. Horniman publishes Amritsar And Our Duty To India. Pearay Mohan, Indian lawyer, senior assistant editor of The Tribune, publishes An Imaginary Rebellion and How It was Suppressed (1920), shortly after the release of the Indian Congress report on the Punjab disturbances of 1919, and in which includes a foreword by Lala Lajpat Rai.

Date	Notes
20 February	Congress inquiry completed, after interviewing and taking statements from over 1,700 witnesses.
8 March	Hunter Committee presents its report to the Government of India.
10 March	After the Viceroy's Executive Council examines the Hunter Committee report, a detailed note on it is written by William Vincent, accepting the majority report.
25 March	Congress Report published.
27 March	Dyer submits his resignation.
4 May	Dyer arrives at Portsmouth.
26 May	In a note to Chelmsford, Montague publishes the British Government's official stance on Dyer, and refers Dyer to the Army Council.
28 May	The Hunter Report, in five volumes, is published. Volumes six and seven are not published.
8 July	The Morning Post establishes a subscription for funds for Dyer under the title "the man who saved India". Dyer's case is discussed in the House of Commons, with O'Dwyer and Dyer present. There, Winston Churchill singles out the violence at Amritsar as "absolutely foreign to the British way of doing things", and Wedgewwod agrees with Gandhi that "we do not want to punish General Dyer; we have no desire for revenge; we want to change the system that produces General Dyers".
14 July	H. J. Creedy informs Dyer that, although no disciplinary action would be taken, he could not be cleared of an error in judgement. Dyer was therefore required to retire on half pay, would not be promoted, and would not be offered further Army employment either in India or elsewhere.
17 July	Dyer officially resigns.
19 July	Dyer is discussed in the House of Lords.
6 December	Dyer thanks readers of the Morning Post for the £26,000 raised for him.

== 1921 ==
In May 1921 the Compensation Committee organised by the Government of Punjab completes the collection of claims from Indians. In the same year, Dyer has a stroke.

== 1922 - 1946 ==
Date	Notes
1922	C. Sankaran Nair publishes Gandhi and Anarchy.
1924	O'Dwyer sues Nair for libel.
1925	O'Dwyer publishes India as I Knew It.
23 July 1927	Dyer dies.
1936	Bugga and Ratto are released from prison after spending 17 years of hard labour in the Andaman Islands.
1940	O'Dwyer is fatally shot in London by Udham Singh. Gerard Wathen's letter to the editor of The Times, dated 25 March 1940, concludes "He [O'Dwyer] was right and I was wrong".

== Post independence ==
Date	Notes
1 May 1951	With the Jallianwala Bagh Memorial Act, the Bagh becomes a memorial of national importance.
1956	Hailey submits his Indian papers to the India office Library.
1965	Hailey adds two notes to his report on the disturbances in Punjab in 1919.
1978	Howgego writes a complaint letter to the Sunday Express.
1986	Alfred Griffith, RAF despatch rider at Lahore in 1919, is interviewed.
2005	Nigel Collett'sThe Butcher of Amritsar is published.
2011	The Amritsar Massacre: The Untold Story of One Fateful Day by Nick Lloyd is published.
2013	David Cameron visits Jallianwala Bagh and quotes Churchill's remarks of 8 July 1920 in the visitors book.
2019	The centenary of the massacre. The Jallianwala Bagh Memorial Act is amended to remove the President of the Indian National Congress as a permanent trustee of the Jallianwala Bagh National Memorial Trust. Several history books based on the massacre are published including Anita Anand's The Patient Assassin and Kim A. Wagner's Amritsar 1919.

== Sources ==
=== Books ===
- Brown, Judith M. (1972). Gandhi's Rise to Power: Indian Politics 1915-1922. Cambridge University Press. p. 240. ISBN 978-0-521-08353-9.
- Cell, John W. (1992). Hailey: A Study in British Imperialism, 1872-1969. Cambridge University Press. ISBN 0-521-41107-6.
- Collett, Nigel (2007). The Butcher of Amritsar: General Reginald Dyer. A&C Black. ISBN 1-85285-575-4.
- Copland, Ian (1997). The Princes of India in the Endgame of Empire, 1917-1947. Cambridge University Press. ISBN 0-521-57179-0.
- Dalal, Chandulal Bhagubhai (1971). Gandhi: 1915-1948, a detailed chronology. New Delhi: Gandhi Peace Foundation.
- Datta, V. N.; Datta, Nonica (2021). Jallianwala Bagh: A Groundbreaking History of the 1919 Massacre. Gurugram: Penguin Books. ISBN 978-0-143450337.
- Devi, Rameshwari; Pruthi, Romila (1998). Women and the Indian Freedom Struggle: Madame Bhikhaji Cama. Pointer Publishers. ISBN 978-81-7132-163-6.
- Fein, Helen (1977). Imperial Crime and Punishment: The Massacre at Jallianwala Bagh and British Judgment, 1919–1920. Honolulu: University of Hawaii Press. ISBN 0-8248-0506-2.
- Furneaux, Rupert (1945). Massacre At Amritsar. London: George Allen & Unwin.
- Horniman, B. G. (1920). Amritsar And Our Duty To India. London: T. Fisher Unwin.
- Mohan, Pearay (1920). An Imaginary Rebellion And How It Was Suppressed. Lahore: Khosla Brothers.
- Mohan, Pearay; Bakaya, Ravi M. (1999). Bakaya, Ravi M. (ed.). The Punjab "rebellion" of 1919 and how it was Suppressed: An Account of the Punjab Disorders and the Working of Martial Law. Vol. 1 & 2. New Delhi: Gyan Publishing House. ISBN 81-212-0687-1.
- Ram, Raja (1969). The Jallianwala Bagh Massacre. Chandigarh: Punjab University.
- Perkins, Roger (1989). The Amritsar Legacy: Golden Temple to Caxton Hall, the Story of a Killing. Chippenham: Picton Publishing. ISBN 0-948251-44-1.
- Sen, Siba Pada (1977). Historical Writings on the Nationalist Movement in India. Institute of Historical Studies. p. 100.
- Swinson, Arthur (1964). Six Minutes to Sunset: The Story of General Dyer and the Amritsar Affair. London: Peter Davies. ISBN 978-81-939094-3-0.
- Wagner, Kim A. (2019). Amritsar 1919: An empire of fear & the making of a massacre. New Haven & London: Yale University Press. ISBN 978-0-300-24546-2.

=== Book chapters ===
- Condos, Mark (2017). "Introduction: fear, panic, and the violence of Empire". The Insecurity State. Cambridge University Press. pp. 8–9. ISBN 978-1-108-41831-7.
- Ilahi, Shereen (2015). "Punjab disturbances". Imperial Violence and the Path to Independence: India, Ireland and the Crisis of Empire. London: Bloomsbury Academic. pp. 29–70. ISBN 978-1-350-15306-6.
- Karki, Meghal (2025). "2. Towards an aesthetics and atmosphere of remembrance: memorialising the trauma of Jallianwala Bagh". In Malhotra, Simi; Assad, Sheikh Sana; Tasnim, Farhana; Pahadi, Somya Charan; Bidani, Sango (eds.). Trauma and Memory Studies: Responses from India and Beyond. Springer. pp. 15–30. ISBN 978-981-96-6373-6.
- Mitra, Sabaree (2023). China's May Fourth Movement: New Narratives and Perspectives. Taylor & Francis. ISBN 978-1-000-82983-9.
- Wani, Javed Iqbal (2023). "1. Invoking exception and defining enemies; extraordinary legislation and the colonial war terror in early twentieth-century India". Sovereign Anxiety: Public Order and the Politics of Control in India, 1915–1955. Cambridge University Press. pp. 41–86. ISBN 978-1-009-33793-9.

=== Journals ===
- Barrier, Jerry (1 October 1977). "V. N. Datta, New Light on the Punjab Disturbances in 1919: Volumes 6 and 7 of Disorders Inquiry Committee Evidence". The American Historical Review. 82 (4): 1053–1054. doi:10.1086/ahr/82.4.1053-a.
- Collett, Nigel A. (2011). "The O'Dwyer v. Nair Libel Case of 1924: New Evidence Concerning Indian Attitudes and British Intelligence During the 1919 Punjab Disturbances". Journal of the Royal Asiatic Society. 21 (4): 469–483. doi:10.1017/S1356186311000435. ISSN 1356-1863. JSTOR 41490046.
- Cross, Wallace (1 January 2006). "The Butcher of Amritsar: Brigadier-General Reginald Dyer". History: Reviews of New Books. 34 (2): 61. doi:10.1080/03612759.2006.10526821. ISSN 0361-2759.
- Datta, V. N. (2005). "General Dyer and Jallianwala Bagh". Economic and Political Weekly. 40 (47): 4911–4913. ISSN 0012-9976.
- Dhillon, Hardeep (June 2024). "Imperial Violence, Law, and Compensation in the Age of Empire, 1919–1922". The Historical Journal. 67 (3): 512–537. doi:10.1017/S0018246X23000560. ISSN 0018-246X.
- George, Joppan (1 December 2024). "Gujranwala, 14 April 1919: Terror from air and airmindedness in late colonial India". The Journal of Transport History. 45 (3): 445–467. doi:10.1177/00225266241262473. ISSN 0022-5266.
- Hunter, William Hunter; Datta, V. N. (1975). New light on the Punjab disturbances in 1919: volumes VI and VII of Disorders Inquiry Committee evidence. Simla: Indian Institute of Advanced Study. "Comprises the final two suppressed vols. of the evidence presented before the committee headed by William Hunter; the report and five vols. of evidence published in London, 1920"
- Jaffe, James (September 2017). "Gandhi, Lawyers, and the Courts' Boycott during the Non-Cooperation Movement". Modern Asian Studies. 51 (5): 1340–1368. doi:10.1017/S0026749X1600024X. ISSN 0026-749X.
- Llewellyn-Jones, Rosie (8 August 2019). "The Patient Assassin: A True Tale of Massacre, Revenge and the Raj". Asian Affairs. 50 (4): 643–645. doi:10.1080/03068374.2019.1662181. ISSN 0306-8374.
- Naidis, Mark (1958). "Amritsar Revisited". The Historian. 21 (1): 1–17. ISSN 0018-2370 – via JSTOR.
- Sayer, Derek (May 1991). "British Reaction to the Amritsar Massacre 1919-1920". Past and Present (131): 130–164. doi:10.1093/past/131.1.130.
- Wadhwa, Mrinalini Sisodia (13 September 2022). "Reclaiming Humanity, Removed in Space and Time: Rabindranath Tagore's "Letter Renouncing Knighthood" in 1919 British India". The Morningside Review. 18: 23. ISSN 2333-6536.
- Willcock, Sean (2 January 2019). "Guilt in the Archive: Photography and the Amritsar Massacre of 1919" (PDF). History of Photography. 43 (1). Taylor & Francis: 47–59. doi:10.1080/03087298.2019.1613791. ISSN 0308-7298. Archived from the original on 5 September 2025.

=== Primary sources ===
- Punjab disturbances, April 1919; compiled from the Civil and Military Gazette. Lahore: Civil and Military Gazette Press. 1919.
- Hunter, William (8 March 1920). Disorders Inquiry Committee (DIC Report): report addressed to Edwin Montagu (PDF). Calcutta: Superintendent Government Printing.
- Hunter, William (1920). Disorders Inquiry Committee (DIC Evidence). Vol. I–III. H.M. Stationery Office.
- Joynson-Hicks, William. "Army Council and General Dyer (Hansard, 8 July 1920)". api.parliament.uk. Hansard. Archived from the original on 16 May 2026.
- Malaviya, Kapil Deva (1919). Open rebellion in the Punjab : with special reference to Amritsar. Allahabad: Abhyudaya Press.
- Nair, Chettur Sankaran (1922). Gandhi and Anarchy. Madras: Tagore.
- Nair, C. S. (1966). Autobiography of Sir C. Sankaran Nair. Madras: Lady Madhavan Nair.
- Nehru, Motilal; Malaviya, Madan Mohan (1920). Report Of The Commissioners appointed by the Punjab sub-committee (Congress Party Inquiry). Vol. I & II. Lahore: K. Santanam.
- O’Dwyer, Michael (1925). India as I knew it 1885-1925. London: Constable & Co.
- Rowlatt, Sidney (1918), Sedition Committee Report, Calcutta: Superintendent Government Printing
- Ministry of Culture (1951). "Jallianwala Bagh Act, 1951" (PDF). Government of India. Archived from the original (PDF) on 22 June 2026.
- Ministry of Culture (2006). "Jallianwala Bagh Act (amendment), 2006" (PDF). Government of India. Archived from the original (PDF) on 22 June 2026.
- Ministry of Culture (2019). "Jallianwala Bagh Act (amendment), 2019" (PDF). Government of India. Archived from the original (PDF) on 10 December 2025.
