= Reginald C. A. Plomer =

- Born: 1864; Delhi
- Died: 24 June 1944 (aged 79–80); Cuttack
- Occupation: Deputy Superintendent of Punjab Provincial Police

Reginald Charles Albert Plomer (born 1864 - 24 June 1944) was Deputy Superintendent of Police in Amritsar, India, between 1914 and 1921. There, on 10 April 1919, he led a small body of police in forcing back a crowd of protestors attempting to enter the European residential quarters via the railway footbridge and held them there until military pickets arrived. Three days later he escorted Reginald Dyer to Jallianwala Bagh and witnessed the massacre there.

For his conduct during the disturbances of 1919 in Amritsar, Plomer was awarded the King’s Police Medal in the New Year Honours of 1 January 1920.

== Early life ==
Reginald Plomer was born in Delhi. He joined the Punjab Provincial Police as a sergeant in 1889 and rose steadily through the ranks, taking no leave during his first ten years of service. In 1909 he was gazetted as Deputy Superintendent, Grade III. He served in Amritsar, Multan, and Jalandhar.

== Amritsar ==
Plomer returned to Amritsar in 1914 as Deputy Superintendent in charge of the city’s police establishment. He was awarded the King’s Police Medal in the New Year Honours of 1 January 1920 for his conduct during the disturbances of 1919 in Amritsar. There, on 10 April 1919, he led a small body of police in forcing back a crowd of protestors attempting to enter the European residential quarters via the railway footbridge and held them there until military pickets arrived.

CITATION
DEPUTY SUPERINTENDENT R. C. A. PLOMER

On 10 April 1919, when the mob from Amritsar city attempted to make its way into the civil lines by the footbridge over the railway, Mr Plomer, at the head of a small body of police, succeeded in forcing the crowd back down and holding them in check until the arrival of military pickets, thereby undoubtedly saving the civil lines. During the investigation into the crimes committed by the mob, Mr Plomer's unrivalled knowledge of the city and its inhabitants has been of the very greatest value.

According to accounts by Reginald Dyer's brigade-major Captain Briggs, Plomer's Superintendent John F. Rehill, and the Indian businessman, Girdhari Lal, Plomer travelled to Jallianwala Bagh on 13 April 1919 in a car with Rehill, following an armoured vehicle and a lead car carrying Dyer, M. H. L. Morgan, Briggs, and Dyer’s two bodyguards, Anderson and Pizzey. Plomer was subsequently witness to the Jallianwalla Bagh Massacre. He later told Chimanlal Harilal Setalvad at the official inquiry that the firing at the crowd that day had already began before he walked in.

Regarding allegations of police corruption in 1919, Nigel Collett notes in The Butcher of Amritsar that J. P. Thompson recorded in his diary on 29 July 1919 that Kesho Ram, whom he described as "a loyal pleader of Amritsar", strongly criticised the conduct of the police and alleged that Plomer "is said to have made a lakh", reflecting allegations that Plomer had amassed substantial wealth through corruption.

== Later life ==
Plomer continued to serve in Amritsar during the period of martial law and throughout the Hunter Committee inquiry. In early 1921 he went on leave.

== Death and legacy ==
Plomer died at Cuttack on 24 June 1944. (Note: Collector of campaign and gallentry awards Roger Perkins notes in his book The Amritsar Legacy that Plomer went on leave in 1921, after which his whereabouts become unknown, with no further record of him in India or the United Kingdom, nor any indication that he ever claimed a pension or left a will or burial record. Plomer's son submitted his father's death notice in July 1944.)

According to writer John Lennard, Plomer appears particularly pertinent to the character of policeman Ronald Merrick in Paul Scott's The Raj Quartet.

== Bibliography ==
- Collett, Nigel (2007). The Butcher of Amritsar: General Reginald Dyer. A&C Black. ISBN 1-85285-575-4.
- Datta, V. N.; Datta, Nonica (2021). Jallianwala Bagh: A Groundbreaking History of the 1919 Massacre. Gurugram: Penguin Books. ISBN 978-0-143450337.
- Perkins, Roger (1989). The Amritsar Legacy: Golden Temple to Caxton Hall, the Story of a Killing. Chippenham: Picton Publishing. ISBN 0-948251-44-1.
- Swinson, Arthur (1964). Six Minutes to Sunset: The Story of General Dyer and the Amritsar Affair. Life Span Publishers and Distributors. ISBN 978-81-039094-3-0.
- Wagner, Kim A. (2019). Amritsar 1919: An empire of fear & the making of a massacre. Yale University Press. ISBN 978-0-300-24546-2.
