= John Ferguson Rehill =

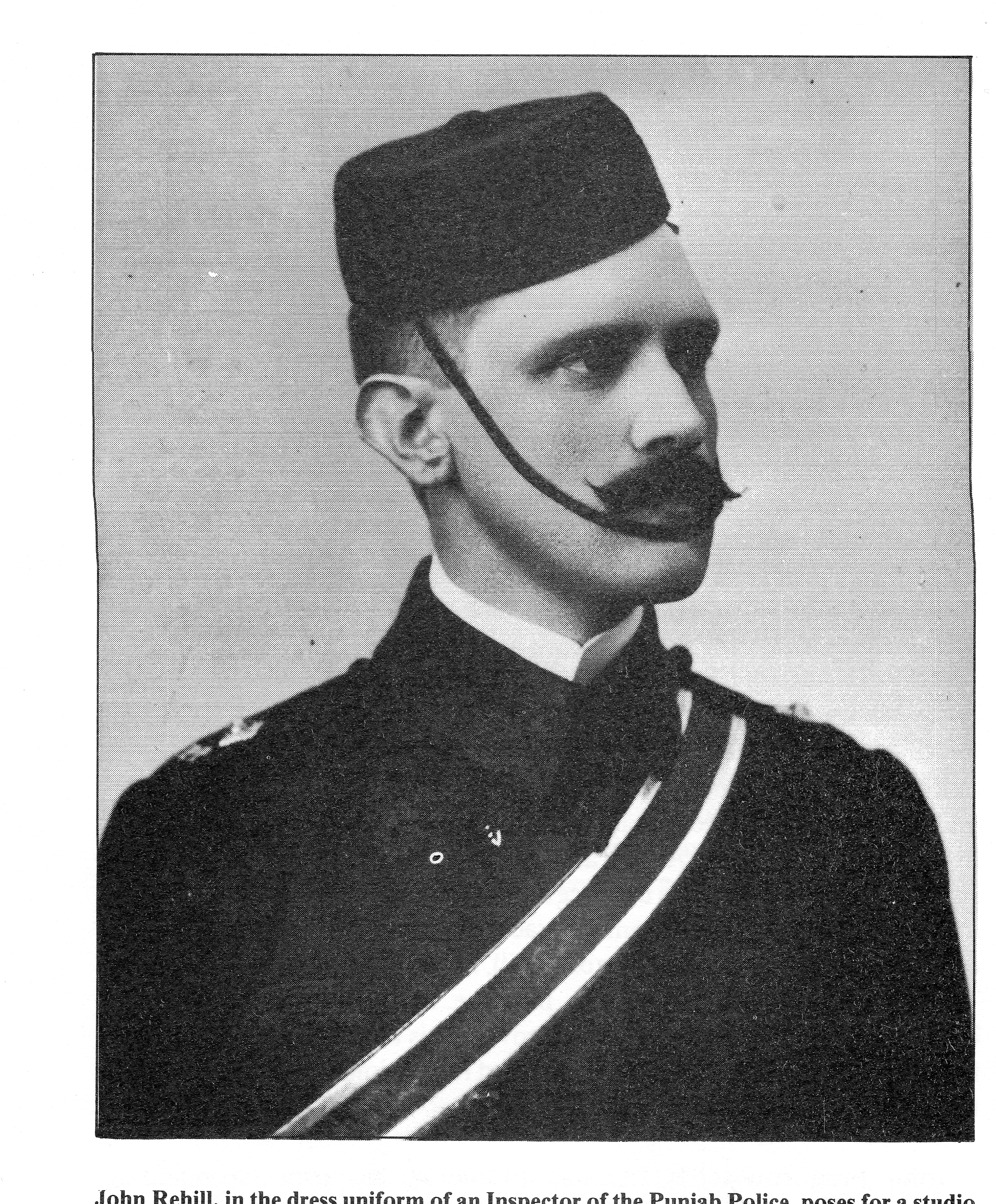
- Born: 14 July 1868; Multan
- Died: 1946 (aged 77–78); Newton Abbott
- Occupation: Superindendent Indian Imperial Police

John Ferguson Rehill (14 July 1868 - 1946) was a British superindendent of police in Punjab, India, known for escorting Satyapal and Saifuddin Kitchlew to Dharamshala on 10 April 1919, and Reginald Dyer to Jallianwalla Bagh three days later. Answering the later Hunter Inquiry, Rehill claimed he heard the shooting of the Jallianwala Bagh massacre, did not enter the Bagh and saw nothing.

== Biography ==
John Rehill was born in Multan on 14 July 1868. He was the second of three sons of John Rehill, an apothecary who served with the army during the 1857 rebellion. His grandfather had travelled to India from Ireland in the 1830s. In 1892 Rehill joined the Indian Imperial Police and became superintendent in 1906.

As superindendent of police in Punjab, and being familiar with the route, Rehill was assigned to transport Satyapal and Saifuddin Kitchlew to Dharamshala on 10 April 1919.

At around 4 p.m. on 13 April 1919, Rehill informed Reginald Dyer that a meeting at Jallianwala Bagh was taking place, with at least 1,000 people already gathered. According to accounts by Dyer’s brigade-major Captain Briggs, Rehill's deputy R. Plomer, and an Indian eyewitness to the Jallianwalla Bagh Massacre, Girdhari Lal, Rehill travelled to Jallianwala Bagh that day in a car with Plomer, following an armoured vehicle and a lead car carrying Dyer, M. H. L. Morgan, Briggs, and Dyer’s two bodyguards, Anderson and Pizzey. According to Lal, Rehill "could not bear to see the firing through and went outside the garden to avoid the sight". Answering the subsequent Hunter Inquiry, Rehill claimed he heard the shooting, did not enter the Bagh and saw nothing.

Rehill continued to work in the police at Gurdaspur for a few more years, and retired in January 1924. According to his niece "After the massacre he took to the bottle and several times was the worst for wear on duty. His colleagues covered up for him. He became depressed and moody... He completely lost his zest and, for very many years had the most appalling nightmares. As a youngster, they tell me, he had been a bold and daring man, but when I knew him, he was a shadow of that former self." After retirement he moved to England, returning to India three years later before spending his last years in Newton Abbott.

== Death ==
Rehill died in 1946 in Newton Abbott. (Note: Collector of medals, Roger Perkins, gives Rehill's year of death as 1952, though it was officially registered in 1946.) He never married.

== Bibliography ==
- Datta, V. N.; Datta, Nonica (2021). Jallianwala Bagh: A Groundbreaking History of the 1919 Massacre. Gurugram: Penguin Books. ISBN 978-0-143450337.
- Furneaux, Rupert (2022). Massacre at Amritsar. Taylor & Francis. ISBN 978-1-000-68932-7.
- Perkins, Roger (1989). The Amritsar Legacy: Golden Temple to Caxton Hall, the Story of a Killing. Chippenham: Picton Publishing. ISBN 0-948251-44-1.
- Wagner, Kim A. (2019). Amritsar 1919: An Empire of Fear & the Making of a Massacre. Yale University Press. ISBN 978-0-300-24546-2.
