= James W. Massey =

James William Massey (born 1877) commanded 184 troops of the 1st garrison battalion, Somerset Light Infantry, at Amritsar in 1919.

== Career ==
James Massey was born in 1877. He was at first commissioned in the Hampshire Regiment. In early 1900 he sailed to South Africa, where he served with the East Griqualand Mounted Rifles during the Boer War and received a brevet rank of captain in 1901. In 1915 he rejoined the Hampshire, and was appointed captain in October of that year.

In February 1917 Massey sailed from Plymouth to India with the Somerset Light Infantry. By the end of 1918, he was stationed in Amritsar, commanding a small garrison of 184 troops from the 1st Garrison Battalion. On 11 April 1919, upon Reginald Dyer's arrival at Amritsar, Massey was replaced with Major MacDonald.

Having served in the army throughout the Punjab disturbances and martial law, though not present at Jallianwalla Bagh on the 13th April, Massey testified at the Hunter Inquiry. After Reginald C. A. Plomer's testimony and before Henry Smith's, Massey told the committee that Amritsar remained largely calm before the Rowlatt Bill, with only politically conscious and educated Indians showing concern, while the wider population became agitated only after the arrests of Saifuddin Kitchlew and Satyapal on 10 April 1919. In November 1920 he was noted Captain with the 3rd Hampshire. (Note: According to medal collector Roger Perkins, Massey did not return to his regiment but moved to Bahawalpur to join in the service of Nawab Sir Sadiq Muhammad Khan Abbasi V. There, he converted to Islam. By 1933, he had been promoted to Colonel, commanding the 1st Bahawalpur Sadiq Battalion, and several of his medals were inscribed with his new name, Abdul Rahman Massey. He died in 1936 and was buried at Dera Nawab.)

== Bibliography ==
- Collett, Nigel (2007). The Butcher of Amritsar: General Reginald Dyer. A&C Black. ISBN 1-85285-575-4.
- Datta, V. N.; Datta, Nonica (2021). Jallianwala Bagh: A Groundbreaking History of the 1919 Massacre. Gurugram: Penguin Books. ISBN 978-0-143450337.
- Perkins, Roger (1989). The Amritsar Legacy: Golden Temple to Caxton Hall, the Story of a Killing. Chippenham: Picton Publishing. ISBN 0-948251-44-1.
- Swinson, Arthur (1964). Six Minutes to Sunset: the story of General Dyer and the Amritsar Affair. Life Span Publishers and Distributors. ISBN 978-81-939094-3-0.
- Wagner, Kim A. (2019). Amritsar 1919: An empire of fear & the making of a massacre. Yale University Press. ISBN 978-0-300-24546-2.
