= Hans Raj (approver) =

Witness in a 1919 case in British India

- Born: 1896; Amritsar, British India
- Died: Unknown
- Occupation: Unemployed/political activist
- Known for: Evidence given (approver) at the Amritsar Conspiracy Case Trial of 1919

Hans Raj (born 1896) was a young Indian from Amritsar, British India. In June 1919, he became an approver for the British government during the Amritsar Conspiracy Case Trial. In exchange for his own freedom, he testified for the Crown and identified fellow Indian revolutionaries.

In early 1919, Hans Raj became active in the non-violent disobedience or Satyagraha movement and began to participate in protests against British rule in India. He was appointed the joint secretary of the Satyagraha organisation in Amritsar and worked to help local Indian leaders Saifuddin Kitchlew and Satyapal, whose arrests and deportation on 10 April 1919 triggered riots. He subsequently arranged a meeting at Jallianwalla Bagh on 13 April 1919, and was present during the Jallianwalla Bagh Massacre. Having survived that day, he was soon arrested but became an approver for the British, providing evidence which led to the sentencing of Kitchlew and Satyapal to two years imprisonment.

Shortly after the trial, he was transferred by the British to Mesopotamia, Iraq. Historians have debated whether he was an agent for the police all along or simply took the opportunity to save his own skin by testifying for the British.

== Early life ==
Hans Raj was from the Katra Bagh Singh area of Amritsar. In 1911, he passed the university entrance exam. His first job was with the North Western State Railway as a ticket inspector, after which he unsuccessfully tried to join the police force and the Indian Defence Force. He subsequently took a job as a correspondence clerk for a Municipal Commissioner at Amritsar, became a banker and then a medical and stationary agent, but was frequently found to be unable to hold down employment due to his dishonesty.

Both his mother and his wife were rumoured to be prostitutes, and were said to provide for him. It was also rumoured that he had close associations with the police.

== Political activities ==
In 1917, Hans Raj joined the Home Rule League and was relatively quiet and unknown until early 1919, at the age of 23, when he began to participate in the protests against the Rowlatt Acts, British repressive legislation set to continue specific wartime powers for use against conspiracies and terrorist activities by revolutionaries. He became the joint secretary of the non-violent disobedience or Satygraha organisation, frequently attended their events and was aware of who had signed its pledge.

On 10 April 1919, the Indian political leaders Saifuddin Kitchlew and Satyapal were summoned to deputy commissioner Miles Irving's home on the orders of Michael O’Dwyer, the Lieutenant Governor of Punjab. They were accompanied by Hans Raj, who waited outside with his colleague Jai Ram Singh. Satypal and Kitchlew were secretly arrested under the Defence of India Act 1915 and deported to Dharamasala, at the foot of the Himalayas, where they were kept under house arrest. The incident triggered a petition for their release and subsequent local riots, where a number of both Europeans, including the school teacher Marcella Sherwood, and Indians were injured and killed, and official buildings defaced.

== Jallianwala Bagh ==
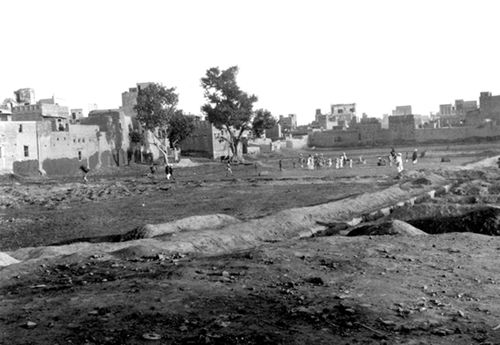
The Jallianwala Bagh in 1919

On the evening of 12 April 1919, as a result of the deportations of Kitchlew and Satypal, in addition to the protests over the Rowlatt Acts and the exclusion of Mahatma Gandhi from entering Punjab, Hans Raj arranged a meeting to be held the next day on 13 April at Jallianwala Bagh grounds. Seth Gul Mohammed, the son of a glassware merchant, helped Hans Raj organise the meeting.

On 13 April, upon arrival of General Dyer and his troops, Hans Raj pleaded to those gathered to sit down. He attempted to assure the crowds that the troops would not shoot. Subsequently, 1650 rounds of ammunition were fired over ten minutes, in what came to be known as the Jallianwala Bagh massacre. Dyer had ordered the troops to fire at the unarmed crowds, resulting in many wounded and "most were shot in the back as they tried to run away. Many were trampled in the panic". An eye-witness statement by Girdhari Lal, who watched the event from a window which overlooked the Bagh described "there was not a corner left of the garden facing the firing line where people did not die in large numbers…blood was pouring in profusion". Having survived the massacre, the following day Hans Raj, now in hiding, warned Mohammed that they were both under the threat of arrest should they be found. Mohammed later recalled that a week later, while he had been arrested and tortured, Hans Raj was being treated favourably at the police station.

== Amritsar Conspiracy Case Trial ==
O'Dwyer declared martial law on 15 April 1919 and backdated it to 30 March 1919. Subsequently, trials of Amritsar conspiracy cases began on 9 June 1919 with the aim of proving that the Amritsar troubles were a pre-meditated plan by local Satyagraha leaders, later found to be untrue. Hans Raj provided the fabricated evidence and "carefully coached" statement as the prime witness, "Prosecution Witness No. 1". As a result of his evidence, Satyapal and Kitchlew were found guilty of conspiracy and "waging of war against the King". They were convicted with 13 others and sentenced to two years imprisonment. Hans Raj's final statement had included an amended version of the account of the summoning of Satyapal and Kitchlew to Irving's house on 10 April, claiming that the two had told him to seek revenge should the summoning lead to an arrest. Despite this sequence of events being not possible, his statement formed the basis of the sentence.

According to historian Kim A. Wagner, Hans Raj "became integral to the effort to implicate as many of the local nationalists and Satyagraha volunteers as possible, first identifying people and subsequently coaching their confessions". A system long established in British India, an approver such as Hans Raj was a suspect who provided a testimony which identified their associates in return for his own freedom. Where there was insufficient evidence to obtain a conviction, the testimony of an approver could be considered satisfactory.

Hans Raj's house in Punjab was burned down on 24 May 1919, before the start of the trial. Shortly after the trial, he was transferred by the British to Mesopotamia.

== Controversy ==
The circumstances surrounding Hans Raj's transformation into an approver are unclear. Historians have disputed whether he had been a police agent all along. He was questioned by Jowahar Lal of the Criminal Investigation Department, whose reputation for torture and threats was well known. According to the lawyer Pearay Mohan, who wrote a book on the Punjab of 1919, titled An Imaginary Rebellion (1920), Hans Raj was a secret agent for the police all along and disclosed his testimonies without expectation of any reward. In addition, he noted that Hans Raj had attended every political meeting in the two months preceding the Amritsar troubles. Various extents of Hans Raj's involvement with police were also noted by Charles Freer Andrews, M. R. Jayakar, Madan Mohan Malaviya, and historian V. N. Datta who wrote that Hans Raj assisted General Dyer in planning the massacre and expected the shootings on 13 April, going as far as to build a wooden platform designed to provide himself with a hiding place during the shooting.

However, Anita Anand's research, published in 2019, found no evidence that Hans Raj had any prior connections with the police. Being in the crowd on 13 April and going into hiding afterwards, according to Kim A. Wagner, suggests that there was no conspiracy and that Hans Raj was not an "agent provocateur" as some have concluded. Wagner states that Raj may not have testified for the British voluntarily. Edmund Candler described Hans Raj as a "pariah of fortune". The secretary of the local Congress Committee described him as "a man of no character". Pearay called him a "rudderless youth of an extremely dubious character".
