= Mahasha Rattan Chand =

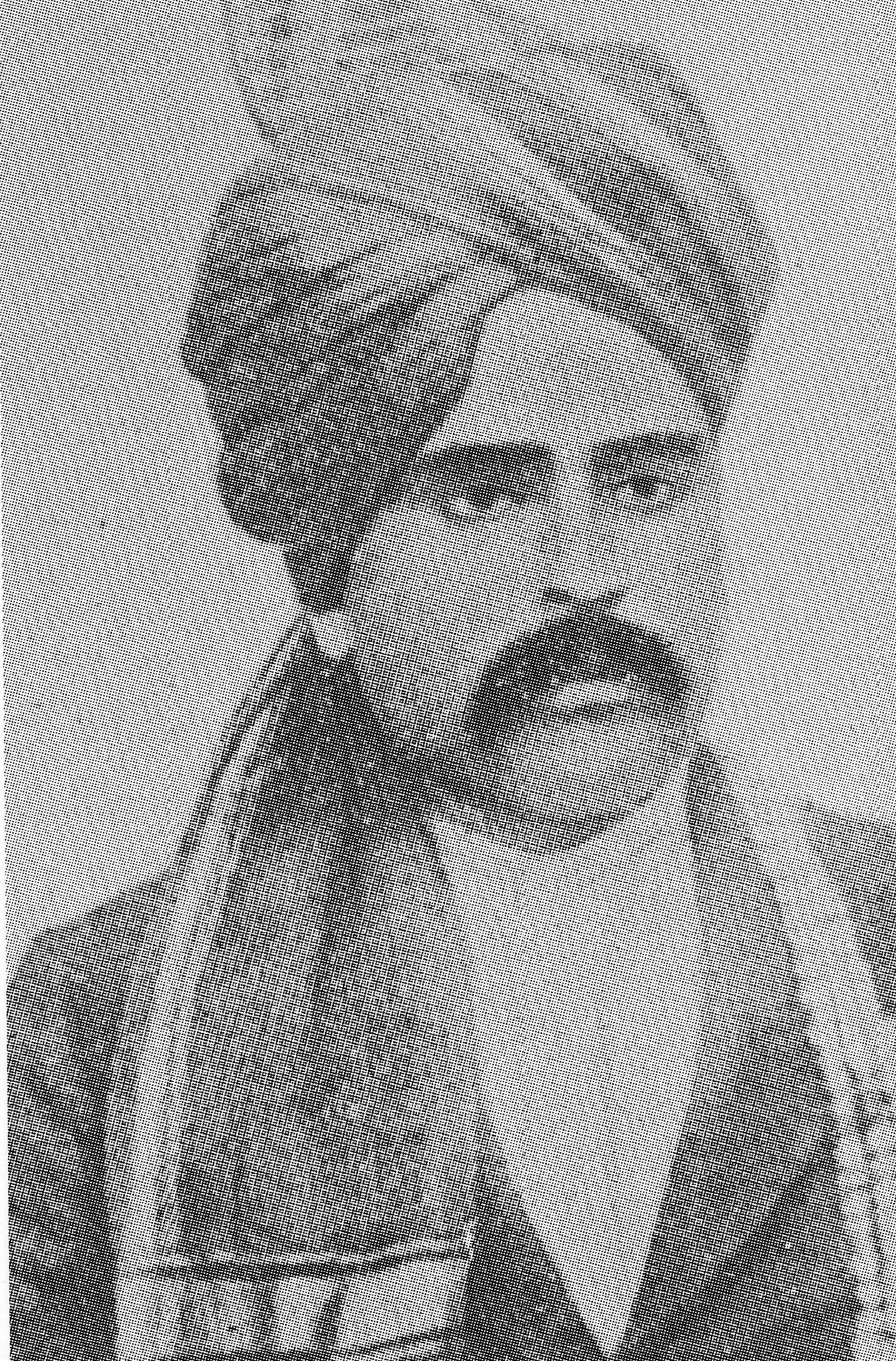
- Died: 1964
- Occupation: Broker

Mahashe Rattan Chand (1875 - 1964), also spelled Mahasha Rattan Chand, and popularly known as Ratto, was an Indian broker, principal of the Shining Club, and anti-Rowlatt Bill campaigner.

== Early life ==
Mahashe Rattan Chand, popularly known as Ratto, was born in 1875 in Ludhiana, son of Lala Sita Ram Khanna, a middle class businessman working in Jalandhar. Although he held no formal qualifications, he became proficient in Urdu and contributed articles to the Lahore based publication Pratap. He worked in the textile trade as a piece-goods broker in Amritsar. There, he lived in the area called Ahluwalia.

Following the death of his first wife, Lakshmi Devi, Chand remarried Puran Devi, who had herself been widowed. From an early age, he showed a talent for singing and became known for performing patriotic and nationalist songs at public meetings. His performances of Pagri Sambhal Jatta during the 1907 Punjab agrarian agitation brought him widespread recognition and contributed to the dissemination of the peasant movement’s message across rural and urban areas.

Politically, Chand joined Sardar Ajit Singh's Bharat Mata Society and later became associated with the Indian National Congress, actively supporting its activities and contributing both financially and through mass mobilisation. He was at one time the principal of the revolutionary organisation called the Shining Club.

== Amritsar 1919 ==
Chand played a prominent role in the political agitation preceding the events of April 1919. According to the charges later brought against him by the martial law authorities, he recited a patriotic poem at a public meeting on 30 March 1919, addressed another meeting on 6 April, and helped organise the hartals and mass gatherings held on 5 and 6 April in protest against British policies.

On 9 April, Chand led the Ram Naumi procession in Amritsar and organised the distribution of free drinking water and refreshments to participants. The following day, he headed a procession towards the Civil Lines demanding the release of Saifuddin Kitchlew and Satyapal. After troops opened fire on demonstrators at the railway bridge, widespread violence erupted in the city. Chand subsequently took a leading role in attacks on Europeans and on British banking institutions. He was arrested, tried by a martial law court, and initially sentenced to death. The sentence was later converted to transportation for life. In his testimony about the events on 10 April 1919 in Amritsar, he said "There at the bridge the object of the people was not to use any force or violence. Its object was to make a request to Deputy Commissioner to try for the release of Kitchlew and Satyapal, and the show was made to make impression on Deputy Commissioner."

== Imprisonment and later life ==
Following his conviction, Chand was transported to the Andaman Islands, where he remained until around 1928. He was subsequently transferred to prisons at Multan, Lahore and Attock. In total, he spent around 17 years in prison before his release in 1936.

== Legacy ==
His portrait appears in Jallianwala Bagh's Martyr Gallery.

== Bibliography ==
- Datta, V. N.; Datta, Nonica (2021). Jallianwala Bagh: A Groundbreaking History of the 1919 Massacre. Gurugram: Penguin Books. ISBN 978-0-143450337.
- Ram, Raja (1969). The Jallianwala Bagh Massacre. Chandigarh: Punjab University.
- Swinson, Arthur (1964). Six Minutes to Sunset: The Story of General Dyer and the Amritsar Affair. Life Span Publishers and Distributors. ISBN 978-81-039094-3-0.
- Wagner, Kim A. (2019). Amritsar 1919: An empire of fear & the making of a massacre. Yale University Press. ISBN 978-0-300-24546-2.
