= Ronald Brymer Beckett =

English civil servant and historian

- Born: 17 January 1891; Rawdon, Yorkshire
- Died: 1 December 1970 (aged 79); Northmoor, Oxfordshire
- Occupation: Indian Civil Service

Ronald Brymer Beckett (17 January 1891 - 1 December 1970) was a British administrator in the Indian Civil Service and later an art historian.

== Early life and education ==
Ronald Beckett was born on 17 January 1891 in Rawdon, Yorkshire, to James Robertson Beckett, a wool and silk merchant, and his wife Annie Bertha Murray, a schoolteacher. At the age of four, his family relocated to Pocklington. Two years later, following an episode of measles, he was sent to Talbot Heath School for Girls in Bournemouth, before continuing his education at Highbury House School in St. Leonards and subsequently at Woodbridge School. In 1907, he attained the highest grades nationally in his Higher Certificate examinations, securing his admission to Lincoln College, Oxford, from where he graduated with third class in Classics, before joining the Indian Civil Service in 1914.

== Career ==
In November 1914 Beckett arrived in India, where he was appointed Assistant Commissioner in Punjab. Having been declared unfit for military service in 1917, he entered the Middle Temple to read for the Bar. After recovering from influenza he was posted to Amritsar. In 1919, Beckett, then assistant commissioner at Amritsar, was present alongside Miles Irving, deputy commissioner, and John F. Rehill, deputy superintendent of police, at the arrest of the Indian political leaders Saifuddin Kitchlew and Satyapal on 10 April that year. When in response a large Indian crowd proceeded to Irving's residence to request their release, Beckitt was assigned to prevent their entry into the European residential quarter. Later that year he gave testimony to the official British inquiry into the Punjab disturbances, the Hunter Committee.

During his career in India Beckett's posts included being guardian to the Nawab of Mamdot, and Judge at the High Court of Lahore.

Beckett returned to England after October 1946 and took to art history. Artists he studied include John Constable, William Blake, Thomas Gainsborough, Thomas Rowlandson, J. M. W. Turner, Peter Lely and Richard Wilson.

== Personal and family ==
Beckett married Norah Ford Anderson in 1918. She would later return to England on two occasions to give birth to their two daughters. He wrote two novels and became a collector of stamps, Indian miniatures, and sculptures.

== Death ==
Beckett died on 1 December 1970 in Northmoor, Oxfordshire.

== Bibliography ==
- Wagner, Kim A. (2019). Amritsar 1919: An Empire of Fear & the Making of a Massacre. Yale University Press. ISBN 978-0-300-24546-2.
