= William J. Anderson (bodyguard) =

- Military career
- Allegiance: United Kingdom
- Branch: (British Raj) British Indian Army
- Commands: 25th Cyclist Battalion
- Conflicts: Third Anglo-Afghan War
- Awards: India General Service Medal (1908)

William John Anderson, was a British Sergeant attached to the 25th Cyclist Battalion, and the personal bodyguard to Reginald Dyer.

== Career ==
On 13 April 1919 Anderson became eyewitness to the Jalianwalla Bagh Massacre. That day he had travelled to Jallianwala Bagh in Reginald Dyer's car along with Captain Briggs, M. H. L. Morgan, and Dyer's other bodyguard, Arthur William Pizzey.

From 23 May 1919 to 20 September 1919, Anderson served in the Third Anglo-Afghan War, for which he was awarded the India General Service Medal (1908).

== Recollection ==
Just after completing his book, Six Minutes to Sunset, Arthur Swinson was contacted by Anderson and interviewed. Anderson confirmed that he was a sergeant in the 25th Cyclist Battalion and was Dyer's personal bodyguard. He recalled that on 11 April 1919, he accompanied Dyer from Jalandhar to Amritsar by car, and that on 13 April, during the Jallianwala Bagh Massacre, he stood a few paces behind Dyer as the firing began. He described how the crowd first fell and then scattered, and that the shooting paused intermittently, with "low moans" audible from the crowd. Dyer targeted the fire at specific areas, while Anderson noticed Captain Briggs tugging at Dyer's sleeve, as Dyer remained calm and composed. Anderson reported feeling no fear and saw no immediate threat from the crowd.

== Bibliography ==
- Collett, Nigel (2007). The Butcher of Amritsar: General Reginald Dyer. A&C Black. ISBN 1-85285-575-4.
- Wagner, Kim A. (2019). Amritsar 1919: An Empire of Fear & the Making of a Massacre. Yale University Press. ISBN 978-0-300-24546-2.
