= The Bombay Chronicle =

Indian English-language newspaper

.

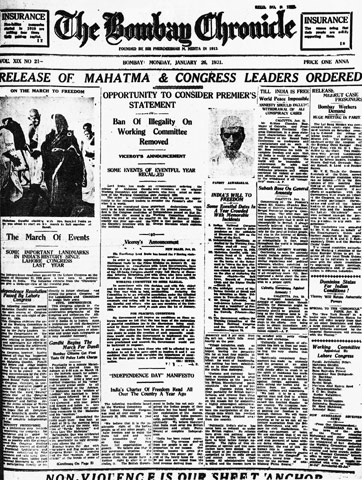
Bombay Chronicle 26 January 1931

The Bombay Chronicle was an English-language newspaper, published from Mumbai (then Bombay), started in 1910 by Sir Pherozeshah Mehta (1845–1915), a prominent lawyer, who later became the president of the Indian National Congress in 1890, and a member of the Bombay Legislative Council in 1893. J. B. Petit had assisted Mehta in launching the newspaper and later went on to control the Indian Daily Mail. From 1913 to 1919 it was edited by B. G. Horniman.

It was an important Nationalist newspaper of its time, and an important chronicler of the political upheavals of a volatile pre-independence India.

The newspaper closed down in 1959.
