= Ratan Devi (witness) =

- Born: c. 1891
- Known for: Witness testimony of Jallianwala Bagh Massacre aftermath

Ratan Devi, sometimes spelled Rattan Devi (born c. 1891), was an Indian eyewitness to the aftermath of the Jallianwala Bagh Massacre, which took place on 13 April 1919 in Amritsar, Punjab, India.

== Amritsar 1919 ==
Upon hearing gunfire on 13 April 1919, Devi went to search for her husband Chhaju Bhagat

Devi told the Congress inquiry;

I found a bamboo stick which I kept in my hand to keep off dogs. I saw three men writhing in agony, a buffalo struggling in great pain, and a boy, about 12 years old, in agony, entreated me not to leave the place. I told him that I could not go anywhere, leaving the dead body of my husband. I asked him if he wanted any wrap, and if he was feeling cold I could spread it over him. He asked for water, but water could not be procured at that place.

Devi declined any compensation for her loss. (Note: In 1921 the Punjab government quietly distributed ₹500 for each death and about ₹300 for permanent injuries at Jallianwala Bagh.) Her account was later recorded by historian Vishwa Nath Datta, and she has been commemorated in a painting at the Jallianwala Bagh Memorial, portrayed in a stage production, and cited in historical accounts of the massacre.
