= Gerald Philip Crampton =

British officer (1894–1983)

Gerald Philip Crampton OBE
- Born: 14 May 1894
- Died: 1983 (aged 88–89)
- Military career
- Allegiance: United Kingdom
- Branch: (British Raj) British Indian Army
- Units: Northamptonshire Regiment; Hampshire Regiment 1/4th Battalion; 9th Gorkha Rifles
- Known for: Jallianwalla Bagh Massacre (1919)
- Conflicts: First World War; Gallipoli Campaign; Mesopotamian campaign; Second World War

Gerald Philip Crampton (14 May 1894 – 1983) was an officer in the British Indian Army attached to the 9th Gorkha Rifles.

== Early life and education ==
Gerald Crampton was born on 14 May 1894, to Thomas Hobbs, a physician, and Augusta. He was educated at Merchant Taylors' School, Northwood, London, leaving there in 1912 before studying science at Downing College, Cambridge.

== Career ==
Crampton was commissioned into the British Indian Army, serving with the Northamptonshire Regiment, the Hampshire Regiment 1/4th Battalion, and the 9th Gorkha Rifles, and participated in the campaigns at Gallipoli and in Mesopotamia.

On 10 April 1919, Crampton was passing through Amritsar railway station en route to Peshawar from Dehradun with his regiment when the station came under attack by a large crowd. He was subsequently ordered to remain in Amritsar. On 13 April 1919, he was formally placed in charge of the troops at Jalianwalla Bagh, acting under the direction of Reginald Dyer.

== Bibliography ==
- Collett, Nigel (2007). The Butcher of Amritsar: General Reginald Dyer. A&C Black. ISBN 1-85285-575-4.
- Perkins, Roger (1989). The Amritsar Legacy: Golden Temple to Caxton Hall, the Story of a Killing. Picton. ISBN 978-0-948251-44-3.
- Wagner, Kim A. (2019). Amritsar 1919: An empire of fear & the making of a massacre. Yale University Press. ISBN 978-0-300-24546-2.
- Report of the Committee Appointed in the Government of India to Investigate the Disturbances in the Punjab, Etc (Hunter Inquiry). H.M. Stationery Office. 1920.
