= Attar Kaur =

Attar Kaur (c.1895 - 31 January 1964), was an eye witness to the aftermath of the Jallianwalla Bagh Massacre on 13 April 1919, when she became the pregnant widow of Bhag Mal Bhatia at the age of 25 years. She later declined ₹ 25,000 compensation.

== Cited sources ==
- Datta, V. N.; Datta, Nonica (2021). Jallianwala Bagh: A Groundbreaking History of the 1919 Massacre. Gurugram: Penguin Books. ISBN 978-0-143450337.
- Devi, Rameshwari; Pruthi, Romila (1998). Women and the Indian Freedom Struggle: Madame Bhikhaji Cama. Pointer Publishers. ISBN 978-81-7132-163-6.
- Ram, Raja (1978). The Jallianwala Bagh Massacre: A Premeditated Plan. Publication Bureau, Panjab University.
