= B. G. Horniman =

British journalist and supporter of Indian independence (1873–1948)

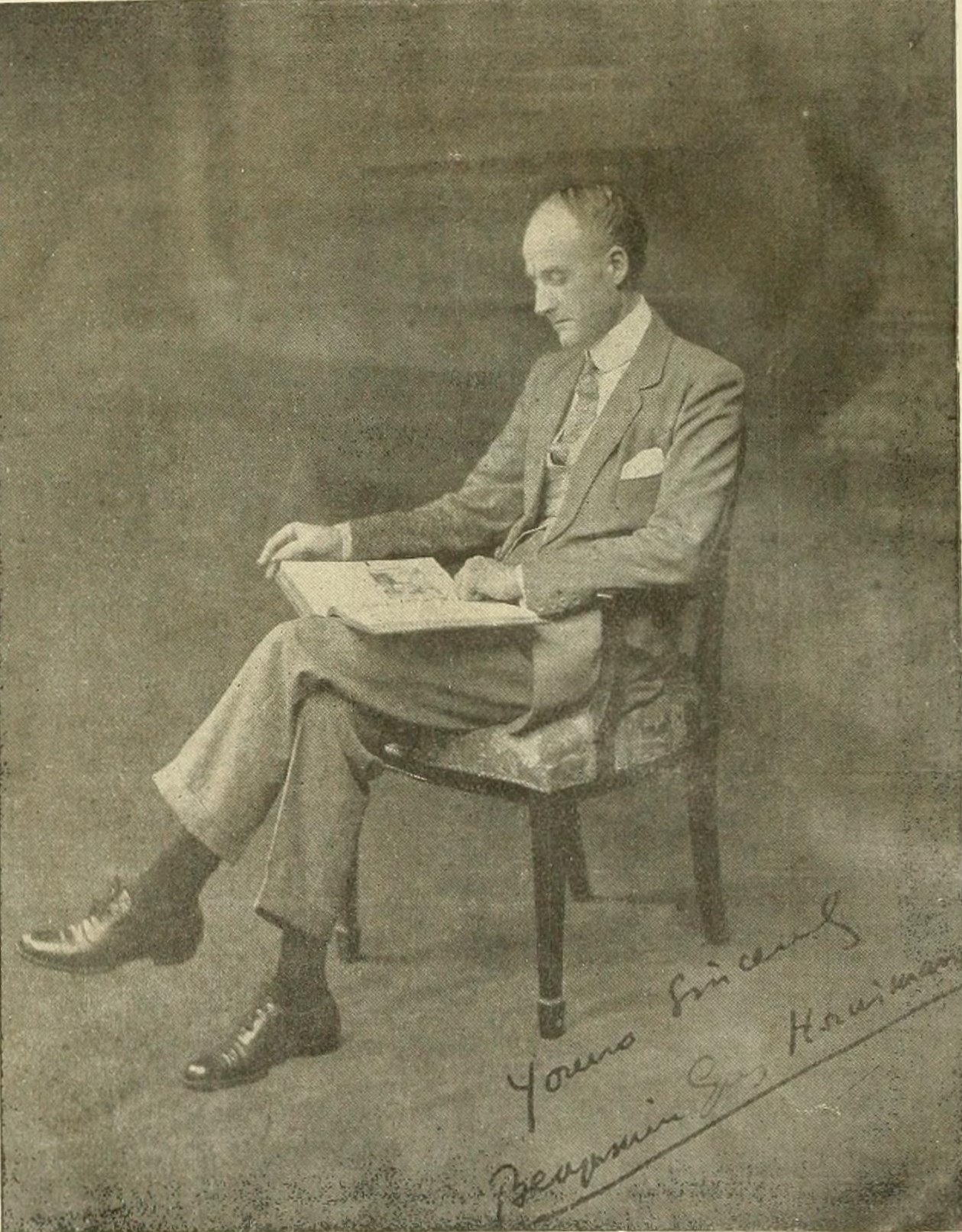
Horniman in 1918

Benjamin Guy Horniman (17 July 1873 – 16 October 1948) was a British journalist and editor of The Bombay Chronicle, particularly notable for his support of Indian independence.

== Early life ==
Horniman was born in Dove Court, Sussex, England, to William Horniman, Paymaster-in-Chief in the Royal Navy, and his wife Sarah, and was educated at Portsmouth Grammar School and later at a military academy.

== Career as a journalist ==
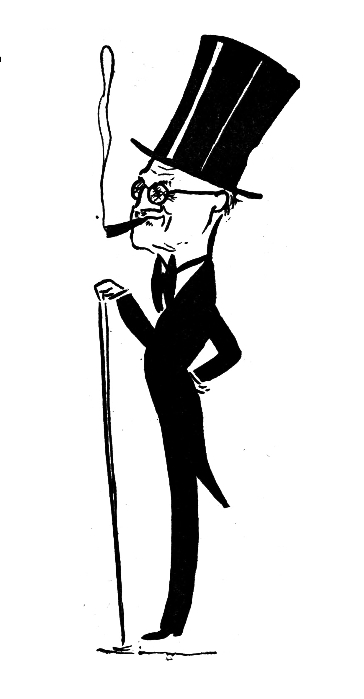
Caricature

Horniman began his journalistic career at the Portsmouth Evening Mail in 1894. Before coming to India in 1906 to join the Statesman in Calcutta as its news editor, he had worked with several dailies in England including the Daily Chronicle and the Manchester Guardian. In 1913, he became editor of The Bombay Chronicle, a daily founded by Pherozeshah Mehta. The paper adopted a trenchant anti-colonial voice and became a mouthpiece of the freedom movement under Horniman. Two years after taking charge of The Bombay Chronicle, Horniman founded the Press Association of India, a union of working journalists that aimed at "protecting the press of the country by all lawful means from arbitrary laws and their administration, as well as from all attempts of the legislature to encroach on its liberty or of the executive authorities to interfere with the free exercise of their calling as journalists". As president of the first trade union of working journalists in India, Horniman fought fiercely for the freedom of the press, sending petitions to the viceroy and the governor "protesting against the misuse of the Press Act by Government and against the constant abuse to which the Defence of India Act was put". Following the Jallianwala Bagh Massacre, Horniman managed to smuggle photographs of the incident and broke the story about the massacre and its aftermath in the Labour Party's mouthpiece the Daily Herald. The exposé broke through the censorship on the matter and unleashed a wave of revulsion in the British public over the incidents and the Hunter Commission. One of his correspondents, Goverdhan Das, was imprisoned for three years. Horniman himself was arrested for his coverage of the massacre and criticism of the colonial government and deported to London, and the Chronicle closed down (temporarily).

In England he continued his journalistic crusade against the colonial government and authored British Administration and the Amritsar Massacre in 1920. He returned to India in January 1926 and resumed the editorship of the Chronicle. In 1929 he launched his own newspaper, the Indian National Herald and its Weekly Herald. He later resigned from The Bombay Chronicle to start the Bombay Sentinel, an evening newspaper which he edited from 1933 for 12 years.

In 1941, Horniman, along with Russi Karanjia and Dinkar Nadkarni, founded the tabloid Blitz.

== Role in Indian independence ==
Horniman served as vice president of the Home Rule League under Annie Besant and called for a satyagraha campaign against the Rowlatt Act in 1919 through The Bombay Chronicle and at public meetings. When Gandhi formed the Satyagraha Sabha to launch a national campaign against the Rowlatt Act, Horniman was made its vice-president. His decision to print an unofficial, smuggled report on the Jallianwala Bagh massacre in defiance of government censorship resulted in his deportation to the United Kingdom by the British colonial government.

== Death and legacy ==
Horniman, who returned to India in January 1926, lived to see India become independent. He died in Bombay in October 1948. Newspapers in Bombay, Calcutta, Madras, New Delhi, and Lucknow eulogised him. An unsigned obituary in The Bombay Sentinel remarked of Horniman that "it is difficult to come across a greater champion of the under-dog. Anybody, with any legitimate grievance, however insignificant he may be, was sure of a patient hearing from him. Not only that, if he was convinced of the genuineness of the grievance, he would go to any length in championing the cause, even though he knew it may land him in libel suits and other prosecutions. Herein lies the unique greatness of Mr. Horniman as an editor. The consequences did not matter to him for he was prepared to take risks in the espousal of a just cause in public interest". The Horniman Circle Gardens in Mumbai, formerly the Elphinstone Circle, were named in his honour. His memoirs, unfinished at the time of his death, were entitled Fifty Years of Journalism.

== Recognition in popular media ==
In his book, Rebels Against the Raj, Ramchandra Guha tells the story of how Horniman and six other foreigners served India in its quest for independence from the British Raj.
