= W. C. Briggs =

American politician (1861–1928)

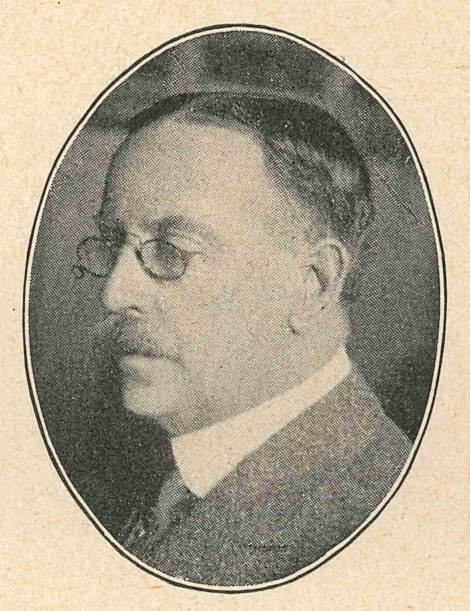
- Portrait in the 42nd Minnesota Legislative Manual

Member of the Minnesota House of Representatives from the 12th district
- In office January 1, 1917 – December 31, 1922

Mayor of Pipestone, Minnesota
- In office April 1916 – December 1916
- Succeeded by: T. E. Nash

Personal details
- Born: July 27, 1861 Yorkshire, England
- Died: June 2, 1928 (aged 66) St. Paul, Minnesota, U.S.

William C. Briggs (July 27, 1861 – June 2, 1928) was an English-born American politician, banker, and real estate businessman.

== Life and career ==
William C. Briggs was born in Yorkshire, England, on July 27, 1861. He attended college in England. He immigrated to the United States in August 1879, settling in northwestern Iowa. From 1881 to 1884, he farmed in the northwestern part of the state as well as in Rock County, Minnesota, the latter of which is where he specialized in raising pure-bred livestock. He eventually settled in Pipestone, Minnesota, in 1885, where he was employed as an agent for the South Minnesota Land Company. He stayed in the position until the company's closure in 1890.

On March 1, 1889, the Bank of Southwestern Minnesota was reorganized as the First National Bank of Pipestone. Briggs became president of the bank in 1898, a position which he held for fifteen years. In 1913, he sold the bank and retired from banking, engaging instead in real estate in Pipestone.

On April 4, 1916, Briggs was elected as the mayor of Pipestone.

Briggs ran for a seat on the Minnesota House of Representatives in the 1916 election. In June, he was nominated without opposition. He won the election, alongside H. C. Danielson and F. F. Norwood. As a result of his election, Briggs resigned his post as mayor on December 13, 1916, and was succeeded by T. E. Nash.

== Death ==
On June 2, 1928, Briggs died at the home of his daughter in St. Paul. His funeral was held on June 4 at the Christ Episcopal Church there and he was buried at Oakland Cemetery.

== Sources ==
- Rose, Arthur P. (1911). An Illustrated History of the Counties of Rock and Pipestone, Minnesota. Luverne, Minnesota: Northern History Publishing Company. p. 345.
- Schmahl, Julius A. (ed.). The Legislative Manual of the State of Minnesota (PDF) (1917 ed.). Minneapolis: Harrison & Smith Co. p. 624.
- Schmahl, Julius A. (ed.). The Legislative Manual of the State of Minnesota (PDF) (1921 ed.). p. 624.
