= Jallianwala Bagh National Memorial Act, 1951 =

Parliament of India
- Citation: Act no. 25 of 1951
- Enacted by: Parliament of India
- Commenced: 1951

The Jallianwala Bagh National Memorial Act, 1951, is an Act of the Parliament of India providing for the establishment and administration of a national memorial commemorating those who were killed or injured at Jallianwala Bagh, Amritsar, on 13 April 1919. On 27 December 1919, the Indian National Congress resolved to acquire Jallianwala Bagh to establish a memorial to commemorate those killed or wounded in the massacre of 13 April 1919. A memorial fund was subsequently created, enabling the purchase of the site, with the property and funds placed under the management of appointed trustees. Among the early trustees were Jawaharlal Nehru, Saifuddin Kitchlew, Maulana Abul Kalam Azad, and Vallabhbhai Patel. The memorial estate comprises Jallianwala Bagh, covering approximately 6 acres, together with two adjoining pieces of land purchased in September 1920 and all buildings and structures situated on these properties. In 2019, the Act was amended to remove the President of the Indian National Congress as a permanent trustee of the Jallianwala Bagh National Memorial Trust.
