= Indemnity Act, 1919 =

Government act passed in 1919 by the British in India

Imperial Legislative Council
- Long title: An Act to indemnify officers of Government and other persons in respect of certain acts done under martial law, and to provide for other matters in connection therewith.
- Citation: Act No. 27 of 1919
- Territorial extent: British India
- Assented to by: Governor-General Lord Chelmsford
- Assented to: 25 September 1919

The Indemnity Act, 1919 was an Act of Indemnity, passed by the British Indian government to protect officials from legal proceedings for actions taken during the imposition of martial law in Punjab and elsewhere in India after the Jallianwala Bagh massacre. Specifically, it granted legal immunity to civil and military officers for acts done while enforcing martial law from 30 March 1919 to 26 August 1919. A complete copy of the Act was published in Pearay Mohan's book An Imaginary Rebellion and How It was Suppressed (1920).

Act No. XXVII of 1919 (25 September 1919) pp. 86-88
