= Mountiford Hickman Llewellyn Morgan =

British army officer (1881–1971)

M. H. L. Morgan
- Born: 18 November 1881
- Died: 1971 (aged 89–90)

Mountiford Hickman Llewellyn Morgan (18 November 1881 - 1971) was a British army officer in the Indian Army.

== Career ==
In July 1900, Morgan left the Royal Military College and was commissioned as a second lieutenant in the Indian Staff Corps. He was promoted to captain in October 1909. The following year he passed exams in Russian.

In 1915 he was injured in Egypt. He was awarded the Distinguished Service Order in 1915. In July 1916, he was promoted from captain to temporary major.

On 3 January 1919, Morgan, then of the 62nd Punjabis, attached to the 124th Baluchistan Infantry, was appointed acting lieutenant colonel while in command of a battalion. On 11 April 1919, at the request of A. J. W. Kitchin, Morgan, then based in Lahore, was selected and recruited by Sir William Beynon to take command of Amritsar. Shortly before Morgan arrived at Amritsar, Reginald Dyer had already assumed the position. According to accounts by Dyer’s brigade-major Captain Briggs, Morgan travelled to Jallianwala Bagh on 13 April 1919 in a car with Dyer, Briggs, and Dyer’s two bodyguards, Anderson and Pizzey. There, he became a witness of the Jallianwala Bagh Massacre. (Note: Morgan's account of the Massacre, titled "The Truth about Amritsar: by an eyewitness" is held at the Imperial War Museum.)

Morgan’s retirement appeared in The London Gazette on 2 September 1921.

== Personal and family ==
In 1913 Morgan married his cousin Anna Hickman Crofts, youngest daughter of Captain Samuel Hodder of Ringabella. In 1939 he married Evelyn J. Treanor.

== Bibliography ==
- Collett, Nigel (2007). The Butcher of Amritsar: General Reginald Dyer. A&C Black. ISBN 1-85285-575-4.
- Wagner, Kim A. (2019). Amritsar 1919: An Empire of Fear & the Making of a Massacre. Yale University Press. ISBN 978-0-300-24546-2.
