= The Butcher of Amritsar =

Book by Nigel Collett

The Butcher of Amritsar: General Reginald Dyer
- Author: Nigel Collett
- Language: English
- Subject: Reginald Dyer, Jallianwala Bagh massacre
- Genre: Historical biography
- Publisher: Continuum
- Publication date: 2006
- Publication place: United Kingdom
- Pages: 576
- ISBN: 978-1852855758

The Butcher of Amritsar: General Reginald Dyer is a 2006 historical biography written by Nigel Collett, a former Gurkha officer, which covers the life of Reginald Dyer. The book's title refers to the 1919 massacre at Jallianwala Bagh in which 379 people were shot by troops under the command of Dyer.

Collett had read Dyer's book Raiders of the Sarhad while he was serving in the army. He returned to it when writing his dissertation for his Master of Arts in biography at the University of Buckingham. He spent three years researching and writing the book and completed the manuscript in 2003.

== Synopsis ==
The book begins with covering Dyer's parents' lives in British India and their brewery company and then moves on to Dyer's early life, from his time as a day boy at Bishop Cotton school in India. The book then covers Dyer's life while he attended Midleton college in County Cork, Ireland and his time at Sandhurst, and then moves on to cover Dyer's life following his graduation from Sandhurst to his postings to the Queen's Royal Regiment (West Surrey) in Cork to their deployment to Belfast during the 1886 Belfast riots and then his service during the Third Burmese War. It then covers Dyer's return to India and being reunited with his family in Shimla and Dyer's studies in the learning Urdu, which was an exam he needed to pass to further his career and his postings to the 39th Garhwal Rifles and the 29th Punjabis to his return to England and the birth of his second child.

The book then covers Dyer's time in the 29th, to the Chitral Expedition, a campaign which Dyer had tried to join but which had ended six days before he arrived back from England, it then covers Dyer's return to England as he had been granted a place at Camberley staff College as he had passed the entrance exams, moving on to cover Dyer's passing the final examinations from Camberley and the birth of his second son. It then goes into detail on the Dyer's family return to India and Dyer being given the designation of wing officer.

The book moves on to cover the Amritsar massacre and subsequent investigation. It covers the reception to the news of the massacre in England to Dyer being pensioned out of the army and the campaign by the Morning Post newspaper which raised £26,000 ($42,386.5) from public donations.

== Reception ==
Antony Copley writing in the Journal of the Royal Asiatic Society said the book would be an award-winning biography. David McKirdy reviewing the book for the Asian Review of Books said that Collett was ideally placed to write this biography, as like Dyer Collett served in the British army, had attended Sandhurst and had also commanded a Gurkha regiment. McKirdy also says the book is a well referenced addition to other books which cover this time in history. Chandar S. Sundaram writing for Itinerario has said that this was the "definitive work" on the massacre and that Collett had detailed the life of Dyer with exceptional skill. Nicholas Fearn writing for The Independent said the book was a "thorough reconstruction" of the massacre and that the book was "heavily detailed treatment and serious to the point of dryness." He also said that because of the material Dyer could be compared to General Melchett from the comedy show Blackadder Goes Forth. Mihir Bose writing for History Today said "Collett has told this terrible story with great, forensic skill, marshalling his facts brilliantly." Gordon Johnson praised it as an "outstanding contribution to our understanding of this horrific event ... [that] presents a balanced reading of Dyer's character".
