= Rupert Furneaux =

British writer

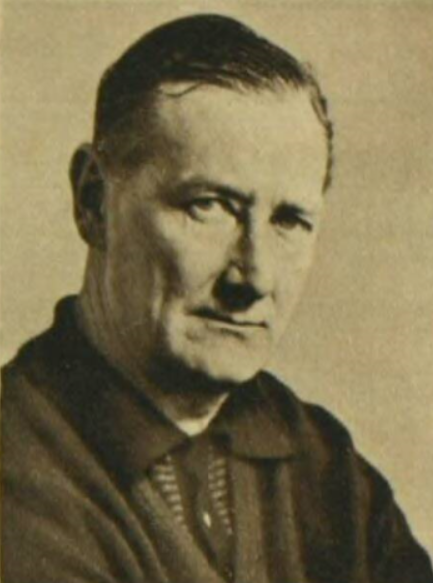
- Furneaux in 1955
- Born: Rupert Kenneth Furneaux; 29 June 1908
- Died: 1981 (aged 72–73)
- Occupations: Author, researcher

Rupert Kenneth Furneaux (29 June 1908 – 1981) was a British writer who wrote many books on mysteries, murder trials and true crime.

== Biography ==
Rupert Furneaux was educated at Eastbourne College. He spent seven years investigating the mystery of Oak Island and published his conclusions in 1972. His book on the eruption of Krakatoa received a favourable review from Eric Shipton.

Furneaux researched cases of true crime and his books on criminology were well received by academics. His research on Guenther Podola was described as a "fascinating reading and is a valuable addition to the studies of those criminal cases in which important psychiatric problems have been raised."

His great-great-great grandfather was the navigator Tobias Furneaux. In 1960 he authored a biography of Tobias.

Furneaux was a golfer, he had been the County Champion of Sussex.

== Publications ==
- The Other Side of the Story (1953)
- Fact, Fake, Or Fable? (1954)
- Famous Criminal Cases (1954)
- The Man Behind the Mask: The Real Story of the 'Ancient Prisoner' (1954)
- Myth and Mystery (1955)
- The Medical Murderer (1957)
- Legend and Reality (1959)
- Guenther Podola (Crime Documentaries 1 (1960)
- Tobias Furneaux, Circumnavigator (1960)
- Robert Hoolhouse (Crime Documentaries 2) (1960)
- The Murder of Lord Erroll (Crime Documentaries 3) (1961)
- The Two Stranglers of Rillington Place (1961)
- The World's Strangest Mysteries (1961)
- Michael John Davies (Crime Documentaries 4) (1962)
- They Died by the Gun (1962)
- Courtroom U.S.A. 1 (1962)
- Courtroom U.S.A. 2 (1963)
- Massacre at Amritsar (1963)
- The Empty Tomb (1963)
- The Zulu War: Isandhlwana and Rorke's Drift (1963)
- Great Issues in Private Courts (1964)
- Krakatoa (1964)
- What Happened on the Mary Celeste (1964)
- The Worlds Most Intriguing Mysteries (1965)
- The Bourbon Tragedy (1968)
- The Great Treasure Hunts (1969)
- Great Clashes of the Twentieth Century (1970)
- Saratoga: The Decisive Battle (1971)
- Money Pit: The Mystery of Oak Island (1972)
- The Tungus Event (1977)
- Ancient Mysteries (1978)
- Buried Treasure (1978)
