= Frederic Cecil Currer Briggs =

- Born: 26 November 1889; Pipestone, Minnesota
- Died: 22 November 1919 (aged 29); Bannu
- Cause of death: Peritonitis
- Military career
- Allegiance: United Kingdom
- Branch: (British Raj) British Indian Army
- Unit: King's Regiment (Liverpool)
- Known for: Witness to Jallianwalla Bagh Massacre (1919)
- Conflicts: First World War; Mesopotamian campaign; Third Anglo-Afghan War; Waziristan campaign
- Awards: Distinguished Service Order (1917)

Frederic Cecil Currer Briggs (26 November 1889 - 22 November 1919), was a British army officer with the King's Regiment (Liverpool) who served in India, Mesopotamia, and the North-West Frontier. On 13 April 1919 he accompanied Reginald Dyer to Jallianwalla Bagh, Amritsar, and became eyewitness to the Jallianwalla Bagh Massacre.

== Early life and education ==
Frederic Briggs was born on 26 November 1889, in Pipestone, Minnesota, to William Currer Briggs. He completed his early education from Bedford Grammar School. After training at the Royal Military College, Sandhurst, he joined the King's Regiment (Liverpool).

== Military career ==
Briggs was commissioned as a second lieutenant on 3 November 1909. He was subsequently posted to India, travelling aboard the HMHS Rewa in January 1910. He was promoted to lieutenant later that same year.

During the First World War, he attained the rank of captain in December 1914. In May 1917 he was posted to Mesopotamia with the King's Own Royal Regiment (Lancaster) as acting major and second-in-command of a battalion. For his service in the campaign, he was awarded the Distinguished Service Order in August 1917.

On 11 April 1919, Briggs accompanied Reginald Dyer to Amritsar, and escorted him to Jallianwalla Bagh two days later. His account of the Jallianwalla Bagh Massacre was submitted as a witness statement to the official Hunter Inquiry.

Before leaving Amritsar to participate in the Third Anglo-Afghan War and the Waziristan campaign, Briggs was invited to the Golden Temple and initiated a Sikh.

== Death and legacy ==
On 22 November 1919, Briggs underwent surgery for appendicitis at Bannu and died the following day from peritonitis. (Note: Some sources claim his cause of death as typhoid.) At the time of his death, he had in possession, Dyer's personal notes on the massacre.

Briggs's name was inscribed on the Delhi memorial, India Gate, and on a plaque at his school.

== Bibliography ==
- Collett, Nigel (2007). The Butcher of Amritsar: General Reginald Dyer. London: A&C Black. ISBN 1-85285-575-4.
- Furneaux, Rupert (2022). Massacre at Amritsar. Abingdon, Oxon: Taylor & Francis. ISBN 978-1-000-68932-7.
- Swinson, Arthur (1964). Six Minutes to Sunset: The Story of General Dyer and the Amritsar Affair. Life Span Publishers and Distributors. ISBN 978-81-039094-3-0.
- Wagner, Kim A. (2019). Amritsar 1919: An Empire of Fear & the Making of a Massacre. Yale University Press. ISBN 978-0-300-24546-2.
