= Miles Irving =

English Indian civil servant (1876–1962)

Sir Miles Irving CIE OBE

Personal details
- Born: 1 August 1876 Singapore, Straits Settlements
- Died: 24 June 1962 (aged 85) Bridport, Dorset, England, United Kingdom
- Military career
- Allegiance: British Empire
- Branch: British Indian Army
- Service years: 1917–1919
- Rank: Lieutenant-Colonel (temp.)
- Conflicts: First World War
- Awards: OBE; Mentioned in dispatches

Sir Miles Irving CIE, OBE (1 August 1876 - 24 June 1962) was an English Indian Civil Service officer. As Deputy Commissioner of Amritsar, the senior government official in charge, he transferred the city's administration to Colonel (temp. Brigadier-General) Reginald Dyer in April 1919, which helped to precipitate the Jallianwala Bagh massacre.

== Early career ==
Irving was born in Singapore, then the capital of the crown colony of the Straits Settlements; his father Charles John Irving was a senior revenue officer who rose to become the colony's Auditor-General. Educated at Blundell's School and at Balliol College, Oxford, Irving sat the Indian Civil Service exams in 1898 and arrived in India on 10 November 1899. He was assigned to the Punjab cadre of the ICS, and in April 1914 served at Lahore, the capital of the Punjab Province. In the same month, he was appointed senior secretary to the financial commissioner of Punjab, with the rank of assistant commissioner (1st grade). In October, he was promoted to deputy commissioner (officiating), Having received a reserve commission in the British Indian Army with the rank of captain, he was called to active duty in February 1917, and was promoted from captain to temporary lieutenant-colonel on 20 February 1917. Initially posted as assistant adjutant-general at Delhi, Irving was subsequently assigned to the headquarters of the Southern Command. He was demobilised in February 1919, having been mentioned in dispatches. For his wartime service, he was further appointed an Officer of the Order of the British Empire, Military Division in June.

== Amritsar ==
Following his demobilisation, Irving was appointed officiating deputy commissioner for Amritsar city and the surrounding district. In March 1919, the enactment of the Rowlatt Act, which imposed stricter press censorship, arbitrary and warrantless searches and detention without trial, triggered massive protests across India. In response to the Act's passage, Mahatma Gandhi called for a general strike (hartal) to begin on 30 March as part of a peaceful satyagraha. On 30 March, the Amritsar satyagraha movement was launched by a Dr. Satyapal, a local general practitioner, and his friend Dr. Saifuddin Kitchlew, a barrister who had studied at Cambridge University and was close to Gandhi, having known him since 1909. Though the hartal in Amritsar on 6 April passed peacefully, on 8 April Irving telegraphed the Lieutenant-Governor of Punjab, Sir Michael O'Dwyer, reporting members of all three major faiths in the city - Hindus, Sikhs and Muslims - had united for the satyagraha. Characterising Satyapal and Kitchlew as agitators and troublemakers, Irving requested immediate reinforcements, including machine-gun units if possible.

With O'Dwyer giving his approval, on the morning of 10 April Irving invited Satyapal and Kitchlew to a private meeting at his official residence in the British cantonment, located in the Civil Lines area. Upon arrival, both were arrested and deported by car to Dharamshala in the United Provinces, where they were held without trial. After Kitchlew and Satyapal's followers were informed of their leaders' arrests, several barrister friends of Kitchlew's led a deputation towards Irving's residence, accompanied by a large crowd.
