= Girdhari Lal =

Girdhari Lal, was a manager at the Amritsar Flour and General Mills Company, and a key witness to the Jallianwalla Bagh Massacre in April 1919, who gave testimony in the Congress Party’s inquiry into the Punjab disturbances.

Along with Madan Mohan Malaviya, Motilal Nehru, Swami Shraddhanand, Saifuddin Kitchlew, Lala Harkishen Lal, and Mahatma Gandhi, he became a member of the committee that acquired the Jallianwalla Bagh grounds for the purpose of making it a memorial.

== Bibliography ==
- Collett, Nigel (2007). The Butcher of Amritsar: General Reginald Dyer. A&C Black. ISBN 1-85285-575-4.
- Furneaux, Rupert (2022). Massacre at Amritsar. Taylor & Francis. ISBN 978-1-000-68932-7.
- Wagner, Kim A. (2019). Amritsar 1919: An Empire of Fear & the Making of a Massacre. Yale University Press. ISBN 978-0-300-24546-2.
