= Nigel Collett =

British lieutenant-colonel (born 1952)

Nigel Anthony Collett (born 20 October 1952) is a former lieutenant-colonel in the British Army and author of The Butcher of Amritsar. He is a contributor to the Asian Review of Books and to China Daily and is a moderator for the Hong Kong International Literary Festival, for which he was instrumental in promoting the first event which had a focus on gay and lesbian writing in 2008.

== Education and military career ==
Collett attended the Commonweal School, Swindon, England from 1963 to 1970 and St Peter's College, Oxford, taking a Bachelor of Arts in Modern History in 1973. He served in the Devonshire and Dorset Regiment and in 1974 attended the Royal Military Academy Sandhurst. In 1983–84 he attended the Army Staff College, Camberley. In 2002 he earned a Master of Arts in Biography at the University of Buckingham.

From 1981 to 1982 he served as a company commander with the Western Frontier Regiment on secondment to the Land Forces of the Sultan of Oman. In 1983 he was an instructor with the British Military Advisory Team in Zimbabwe. In 1984 he was promoted to major and transferred to the 6th Queen Elizabeth's Own Gurkha Rifles, and was posted to Hong Kong, where he served from 1985 to 1992, including tours as brigade major 48 Gurkha Infantry Brigade and brigade major Brigade of Gurkhas. In 1991, he was promoted to lieutenant-colonel and was given command of the 6th in Hong Kong and was garrison commander for the British Forces in Brunei from 1992 to 1993.

Since 1994, he has been managing director of Gurkha International Manpower Services Ltd and Gurkha International (Hong Kong) Ltd, both in Hong Kong; website www.gurkha.com.hk. He is vice chairman of the Hong Kong and China Branch of the Royal British Legion and vice chairman of the Asia Africa Committee of the Hong Kong General Chamber of Commerce.

== Published works ==
- A Grammar, Phrase Book and Vocabulary of Baluchi; ISBN 978-0950934518.
- A Nepali-English-Nepali Dictionary; ISBN 978-0950934525.
- The Butcher of Amritsar: General Reginald Dyer published by Continuum in 2005; ISBN 1 85285 457 X. It is a biography of Reginald Dyer, the man responsible for the massacre at Jallianwala Bagh and was generally well received.
- Firelight of a Different Colour: The Life and Times of Leslie Cheung Kwok-wing published by Signal 8 Press, Hong Kong in 2014; ISBN 978-988-15542-6-0.
- A Death in Hong Kong: The MacLennan Case of 1980 and the Suppression of a Scandal, published by City University of Hong Kong Press in 2018; ISBN 978-962-937-557-7
