= Arthur Swinson =

British Army officer, writer, playwright, and historian (1915–1970)

Arthur Horace Swinson (1915–1970) was a British Army officer, writer, playwright, and historian. A prolific playwright, he wrote more than 300 works.

Swinson was born in St Albans, Hertfordshire, to Hugh Swinson and Lilla Fisher Swinson. He attended St Albans School. He enlisted in the Rifle Brigade in 1939 and in 1940 was commissioned into the Worcestershire Regiment. In the Far East, he fought at the 1944 Battle of Kohima as a staff captain with the British 5th Brigade, which commanded the 7th Battalion of his regiment. The diaries he kept during the battle are now lodged in the Imperial War Museum. He served until 1946, with postings in British Malaya, Burma, Assam and India during World War II. In 1949, he subsequently became a writer and producer at the BBC where he produced a number of programmes for Richard Attenborough.

In 1964 Swinson published a book about the Jallianwala Bagh massacre entitled Six Minutes to Sunset: The Story of General Dyer and the Amritsar Affair which aimed to justify Reginald Dyer's actions, claiming they were influenced by a fear of an invasion from Afghanistan and a desire to protect European women.

In 1966 Swinson wrote and published Kohima, an account of the Battle of Kohima which was fought from April to June 1944 and in which he was a participant. The preface states that Field Marshal William Slim directed Swinson to ensure that Kohima and Imphal are described as twin battles fought under Slim's 14th Army. This Swinson does. Ultimately, however, the book focuses on the experience of the British 2nd Infantry Division. The book is a good adjunct to Slim's Defeat into Victory and John Masters' Road Past Mandalay.

Swinson was the author of Scotch on the Rocks (1963 and 2005), which told the true story of the wartime wreck of the SS Politician, on which Compton Mackenzie's novel Whisky Galore (1947) – and the Ealing Comedy of the same title – were based.

He died in Spain while on holiday, aged 55. He was survived by his wife, Joyce Budgen, and their three children.

== Bibliography ==
- Scotch on the Rocks: The True Story of the Whisky Galore Ship. Peter Davies, 1963; reprinted Luath Press, 2005
- Six Minutes to Sunset. Peter Davies, 1964
- Writing for Television Today. A & C Black, 1965
- Casebook of Medical Detection. Peter Davies, 1965
- Sergeant Cork's Casebook. Arrow, 1965
- Sergeant Cork's Second Casebook. Arrow, 1966
- Kohima. Cassell, 1966
- North-West Frontier: People and Events 1839-1947. Hutchinson, 1967
- Siege of Saragoda. Corgi Books, 1968
- The Raiders: Desert Strike Force. Ballantine, 1968
- The Great Air Race. Cassell, 1968
- Four Samurai: A Quartet of Japanese Army Commanders in the Second World War. Hutchinson, 1968
- Commanders in the Second World War. Hutchinson, 1968
- The Memoirs of Private Waterfield. Cassell, 1968 (with Donald Scott)
- The Temple. Michael Joseph, 1970
- Defeat in Malaya: The Fall of Singapore. Ballantine, 1970
- Frederick Sander: The Orchid King. Hodder & Stoughton, 1970
- Beyond the Frontiers: The Biography of Colonel F. M. Bailey, Explorer and Special Agent. Hutchinson, 1971
- A Register of the Regiments and Corps of the British Army. Archive Press, 1972
- Wingate in Peace and War: An Account of the Chindit Commander. MacDonald, 1972
- Mountbatten. Pan/Ballantine, 1973
- Guadalcanal: Island Ordeal. Ballantine, 1973
