= Satyapal =

Indian physician and politician

Satyapal Singh
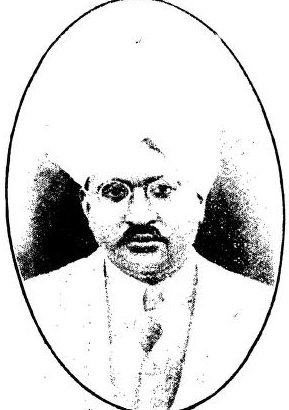
- Dr Satya Pal 1919
- Born: 11 May 1885; Wazirabad, Gujranwala District, Punjab Province
- Died: 18 April 1954 (aged 68); Shimla, Himachal Pradesh
- Occupation: Physician
- Spouse: Gian Devi
- Military career
- Allegiance: British India
- Branch: British Indian Army
- Service years: 1915–1916; 1941–1945
- Rank: Captain
- Conflicts: First World War; Second World War

Satyapal also known as Dr Satya Pal (11 May 1885 — 18 April 1954) was a physician and political leader in Punjab, British India, who was arrested along with Saifuddin Kitchlew on 10 April 1919, three days before the Jallianwala Bagh massacre.

== Early life ==
Satyapal was educated at Peterhouse, Cambridge, where he was a friend of Jawaharlal Nehru. On 17 September 1915, during the First World War, he received a temporary King's Commission as a lieutenant in the Indian Medical Service, serving with distinction. For unspecified reasons, he relinquished his commission with effect from 16 September 1916, and upon return to India and following the Rowlatt Act he became active in the movement of non-cooperation and non-violent resistance to British rule.

He was married to Gian Devi. He had a successful practice in the old part of the city of Amritsar.

== Arrest ==
On the orders of Michael O’Dwyer the CID had kept close surveillance on Kitchlew and Satypal from mid-March 1919. Again, following the orders of O'Dwyer, they were summoned to Miles Irving, the Deputy Commissioner's house in the Civil Lines on 10 April 1919. Satypal recalled "I did not at all attach much importance to the matter and went about my daily rounds as usual", not having thought of it as great importance. They were both already barred from political activities and attended that day with their friends Hans Raj and Jai Ram Singh. Kitchlew arrived shortly before Satypal and after a few minutes of waiting, were called in and given The Defence of India Orders with the request for both to leave Amritsar immediately. Miles Irving recounted the secret nature of the operation as he "decided that they would be 30 miles on their way to Dharamsala before any one knew about it". After being given permission to write to their families, Satyapal and Kitchlew were driven by John Ferguson Rehill, and escorted by four soldiers disguised in hunting gear. Hans Raj and Jai Ram Singh were kept waiting on Irving's veranda in case the news of the arrest spread before Kitchlew and Satypal were far away enough. They waited an hour before Irving passed to them the letters to their families. Satypal recounted "there was a military escort with guns in each car" and "the cars were driven at high speed and we did not halt till we got to the Nurpur Dak Bungalow", which was 50 miles away from Amritsar. They reached Dharamasala, at the foot of the Himalayas, at 8 pm that evening, and were kept under house arrest.

As the news of the arrest spread, supporters began to gather near Irving's home and what initially appeared a peaceful attempt to make enquiries ended up in a violent clash. On 13 April 1919, protesting over the arrest, a meeting was called to take place at Jallianwala Bagh.

In June 1919 at the trial of the 'Amritsar conspiracy case at Lahore', Satyapal was convicted with 14 others and sentenced to two years imprisonment, following the statement of Hans Raj, who attended the trial as an approver.

== Later life ==
Following the outbreak of the Second World War, Satyapal rejoined the Indian Medical Service, receiving an emergency commission as a captain on 8 December 1941 (with ante-date seniority from 8 December 1936). After Indian independence, he remained active in politics and in 1952 was successful in contesting the elections to the Punjab Vidhan Sabha. He died at Shimla in Himachal Pradesh on 18 April 1954.

== Bibliography ==
- Goyal, Shailja, Dr. Satyapal, the hero of freedom movement in the Punjab. PBG Publications (2004)
- Anand, Anita. (2019) The Patient Assassin: A true tale of massacre, revenge, and India's quest for independence. New York: Scribner. ISBN 978-1-5011-9570-9
- Wagner, Kim A. (2019) Amritsar 1919: An Empire of Fear and the Making of a Massacre. New Haven: Yale University Press. ISBN 9780300200355
