= Vishwa Nath Datta =

Indian historian (1926–2020)

- Born: 25 May 1926; Amritsar, India
- Died: 30 November 2020 (aged 94); New Delhi
- Education: Government College, Lahore; Lucknow University, India; Cambridge University, UK
- Occupation: Historian
- Spouse: Kamala Datta
- Children: 3 daughters
- Writing career
- Pen name: VND, VN Datta, Datta Sahab
- Website: www.youtube.com/channel/UCUjLBlz2NCSZw4eC2-QlDhw/featured

Vishwa Nath Datta (25 May 1926 – 30 November 2020) was a distinguished Indian writer, historian and professor emeritus at Kurukshetra University.

== Early life ==
Datta was born into an illustrious family of Amritsar as the son of the leading businessman [who owned the Shankar Das Vishwa Nath Company among others] and Urdu-Persian poet Padma Shri Brahm Nath Datta Qasir. The family lived in Katra Sher Singh near Jallianwala Bagh in Amritsar. Datta was educated at Government College, Lahore, Lucknow University and Cambridge University, United Kingdom. Datta went to Cambridge University for research work where he was guided by Sir Herbert Butterfield and Percivel Spear.

Datta's association with Harivansh Rai Bachchan travelled further from Amritsar to Cambridge, and the friendship grew. In a series of works, Bachchan discussed his enduring bond with Vishwa (Nath), dedicated his book, Buddh Aur Nachghar Tatha Pratham Kathaye to him and his wife, Kamala and considered him the first "nakshatrta purush" (the brightest star in the zodiac) he had met.

Bachchan writes in Basere se door: "Vishwa Nath Datta, whom I later started calling Vishwa, belonged to Amritsar. I first met him at the house of a teacher-friend, among whose favourite pupils he was. After completing his MA in history from Lucknow University and perhaps in English he had come to Cambridge University for his doctorate. His father was a prosperous businessman and, at considerable expense, sent his son to Cambridge for three years with his wife. Vishwa’s wife’s name was Kamala. They had arrived in Cambridge two years before me. Kamala had also started studying for a degree or a diploma. Vishwa was about 25—just the right age to imbibe the Cambridge spirit. When I arrived in Cambridge, Vishwa was completely immersed in the Cambridge tradition."

== Career and works ==
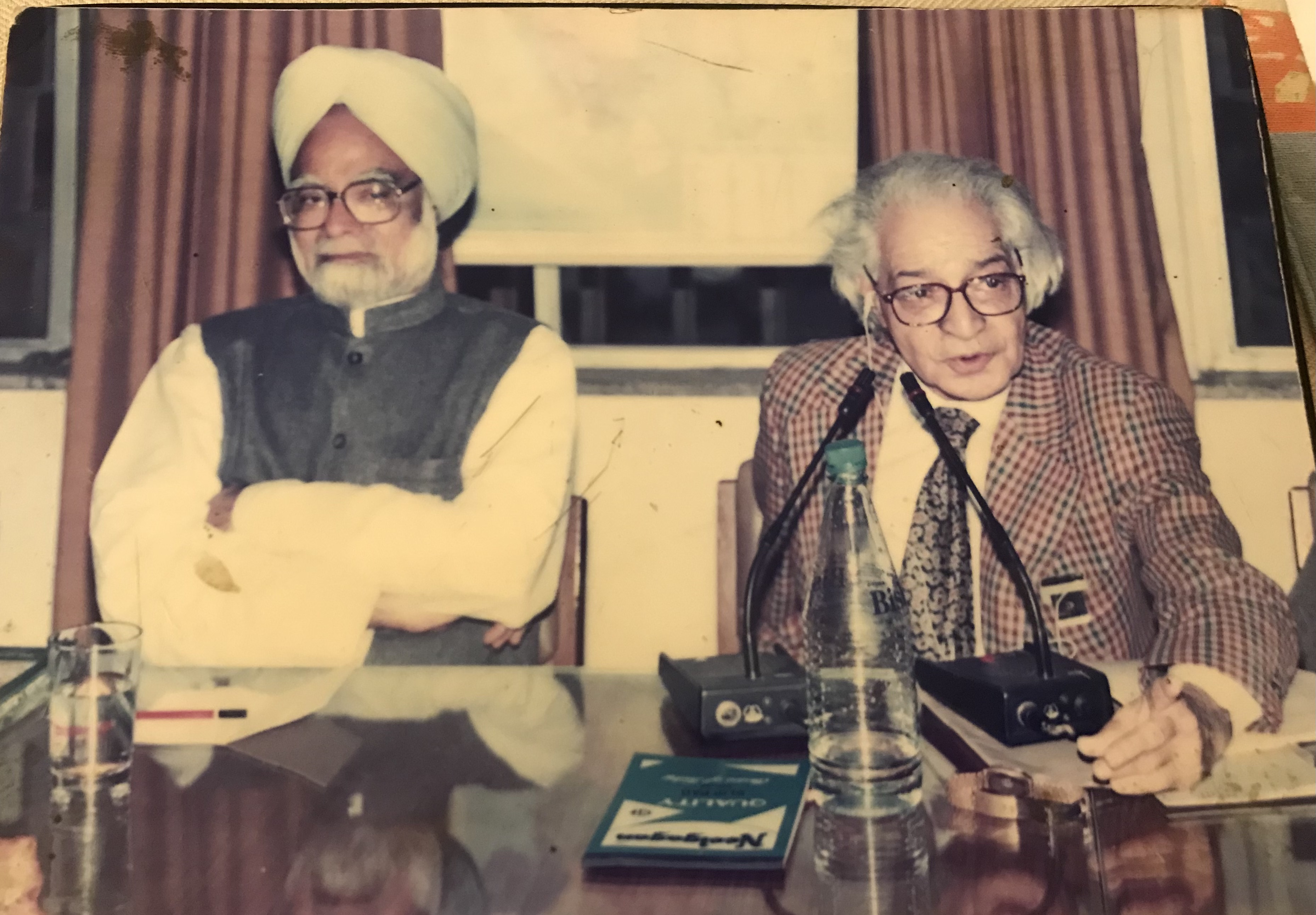
VN Datta with Dr. Manmohan Singh, Prime Minister of India

Datta was Professor Emeritus, Kurukshetra University, where he set up the Department of History in what was to become the newly founded state of Haryana, after leaving a lucrative position in government service. Besides a short stint of teaching at Kirori Mal College, Delhi University, in his early career, he was also a visiting professor at a number of universities including Moscow, Leningrad, and Berlin, and Resident Fellow of Fitzwilliam College, Cambridge.

Datta is the author of several books on the history of India. In 1967, he published Amritsar: Past and Present. Two years later, on the 50th anniversary of the Jallianwalla Bagh Massacre, he wrote the pioneering work, Jallianwala Bagh (recently republished as a Penguin edition with a new introduction by Nonica Datta), hailed as a landmark classic on the Jallianwala Bagh massacre. Later, he edited some of the British reports on the massacre as New Light on the Punjab Disturbances in 1919: Vol. VI and VII of Disorders Inquiry Committee Evidence (Indian Institute of Advanced Study, 1975).

His other works included A Nationalist Muslim and Indian Politics, Being the Selected Correspondence of the Late Dr. Syed Mahmud (1974); Madan Lal Dhingra and the Revolutionary Movement (1978); History of Kurukshetra (1985); Sati: A Historical, Social, and Philosophical Enquiry Into the Hindu Rite of Widow-Burning (1988); Maulana Azad (1990); Maulana Abul Kalam Azad and Sarmad (2007); Gandhi and Bhagat Singh (2008). Datta often wrote for The Tribune, for which he started writing since 1946 as a student in Lahore. "His column 'Off the Shelf' in The Tribune won him great accolades." Later he authored The Tribune: 130 Years: A Witness to History, a comprehensive book relating to the 130-year history of The Tribune, a publication founded in 1881 by Sardar Dyal Singh Majithia.

Prime Minister Manmohan Singh commented "I compliment all those who have helped shape The Tribune into the newspaper it is today—the generations before us and the current torch-bearers of this fine institution. I congratulate the author of ‘A Witness to History’ Professor V.N. Datta for writing such a fine book."

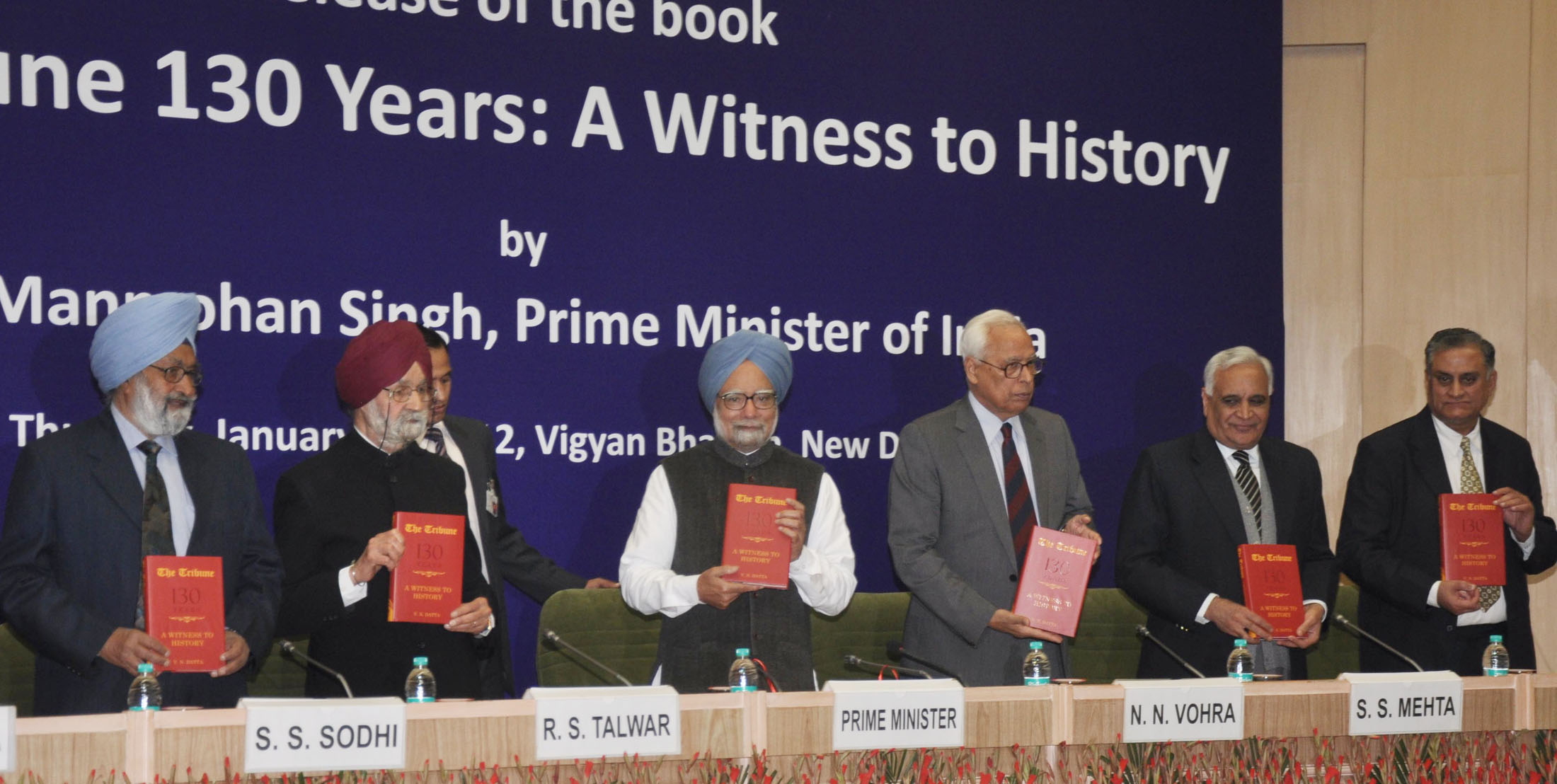
The Prime Minister, Dr. Manmohan Singh releasing the book titled "The Tribune 130 years: a witness to history"

Ramachandra Guha called VN Datta a "pioneering historian of Indian nationalism and Modern Indian History", and a "profoundly decent and generous man".

"Like all good historians," Guha recalled, "he was driven by curiosity, not by ideology. His memory is that of a first-rate professional historian, who knew the tools of the craft and had mastered them." Guha said Datta was "comradely, collegial and friendly", which was at odds with the usual hierarchical structure in academics. "His command over languages – particularly over Urdu and Punjabi – meant he didn’t rely on English language sources, unlike many other historians. He wrote both on the non-violent streams as well as the revolutionary stream. If you see his writings on the freedom struggle, he wrote on Madan Lal Dhingra, Bhagat Singh, but also on Gandhi. Because he knew Urdu, he also wrote on (Maulana Abul Kalam) Azad and (Muhammad) Iqbal," Guha said. "He also did a very important anthology of documents on Jallianwala Bagh. That’s also the duty of a historian – to collect documents and make them available for all scholars, not just for yourself," Guha said."

== Tributes and legacy ==
Former prime minister Manmohan Singh sent a wreath to the family.

Aligarh historian, Irfan Habib stated, "The passing away of Professor VN Datta deprives the Indian community of historians of one of its recognised stalwarts. He had made events and aspects of the National movement his special field and whatever he wrote on it had the quality of definitiveness, about it."

== Selected publications ==
- Jallianwala Bagh. Kurukshetra [Kurukshetra University Books and Stationery Shop for] Lyall Book Depot, 1969. OCLC 133038 Recently published by Penguin India, 2021.
- New light on the Punjab disturbances in 1919 : volumes VI and VII of Disorders Inquiry Committee evidence. Simla : Indian Institute of Advanced Study, 1975. With William Hunter Hunter, Lord; India. Committee on Disturbances in Bombay, Delhi, and the Punjab. OCLC 2644032
- Madan Lal Dhingra and the revolutionary movement. New Delhi: Vikas, 1978. ISBN 9780706906578. OCLC 5414058.
- History of Kurukshetra. Kurukshetra: Vishal, 1985. OCLC 13330154
- Sati: a historical, social and philosophical enquiry into the Hindu rite of widow burning. Riverdale, Md.: Riverdale Co., 1988. OCLC 18737264
- Maulana Azad. New Delhi: Manohar, 1990. ISBN 9788185054988. OCLC 21593610
- Maulana Azad and Sarmad. New Delhi: Rupa, 2007. ISBN 978-81-291-2662-7

=== Articles ===
- "Understanding Bhagat Singh". The Tribune. 11 March 2007
- "1857: The First Challenge". The Tribune. 10 May 2007
