= Jallianwala Bagh =

Garden and memorial in Punjab, India

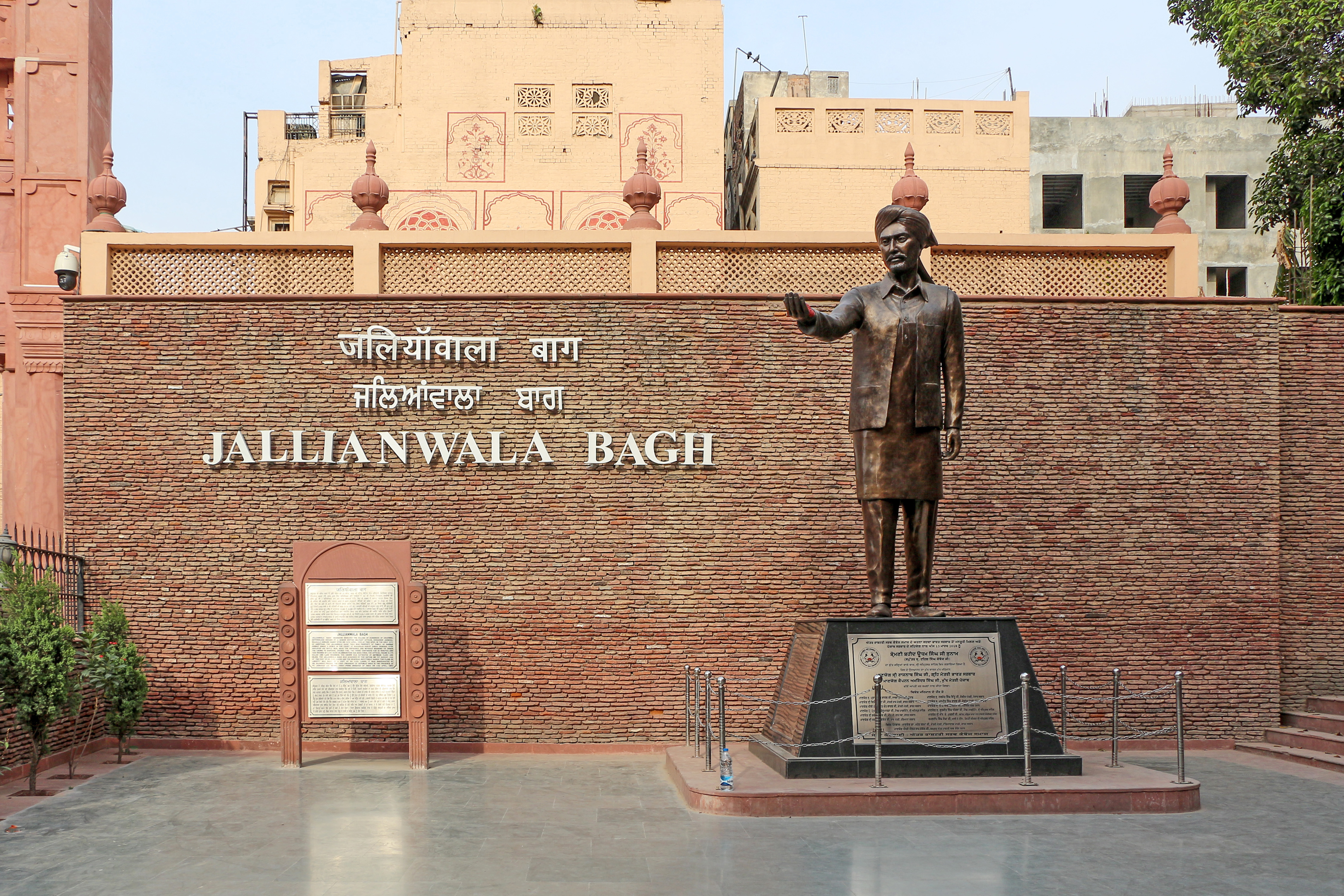
- Entrance with statue of Udham Singh

- Location in Punjab, India Jallianwala Bagh (India)
- 31.620521°N 74.880565°E
- Type: Memorial site
- Location: Amritsar, Punjab, India

History
- Founded: Sardar Himmat Singh Bains Jallewalia
- Built: 1812
- Built for: As a Bagh and samadhi of Jallewalia sardar
- Original use: Garden

Site notes
- Area: 7-acre (28,000 m^{2})
- Governing body: Jallianwala Bagh National Memorial Trust
- Owner: Jallianwala Bagh National Memorial Trust

Jallianwala Bagh (IPA: [dʒəlɪjãːʋaːlaː baːɣ, baːɡ]) is a historic garden and memorial of national importance close to the Golden Temple complex in Amritsar, Punjab, India, preserved in the memory of those wounded and killed in the Jallianwala Bagh Massacre that took place on the site on the festival of Baisakhi Day, 13 April 1919. The 7-acre (28,000 m^{2}) site houses a museum, gallery and several memorial structures. It is managed by the Jallianwala Bagh National Memorial Trust, and will be renovated between 2025 and 2027.

== History ==
=== Early history ===
The 7-acre (28,000 m^{2}) site is located in the vicinity of the Golden Temple complex.

The Bagh was founded by Sardar Himmat Singh Bains, Jagirdar of Alawalpur, Dhogri and other villages in the area, as well as additional villages in Gurdaspur, Multan, Kohat, and Peshawar amounting to an annual income of RS 3,00,000. He also held Jallah, valued at RS 20,000 annually, in district Ludhiana while also serving as an ambassador to the Riyasat of Nabha. His father, Chaudhary Gulab Rai Bains, was a grand Zamindar of Mahilpur and Jagirdar of Achharwal and villages near Adampur in the 1760s. In 1812, the Maharaja of Nabha introduced Sardar Himmat Singh to Sher-e-Punjab Maharaja Ranjit Singh, who was impressed by Himmat Singh's abilities and appointed him as his personal advisor and Vakil-i-Multaq. In 1812 Sardar Himmat Singh Founded a garden, which came to be known as Jalle Waliyan da Bagh or Jalleyan Bagh, with the name "Jallah" deriving from his estate, Jallah Jagir, in Ludhiana. His family became known in the Lahore Durbar as the Jallewalia Sardars. After the Jallianwala Bagh massacre on 13 April 1919, the site gained symbolic importance. A commemorative committee was formed and, in 1923, they purchased the Bagh for RS 565,000.

Jallianwala Bagh or the garden of the Jallah-man, with its well, implies that it was once green and flowering. Over the years it had become popular as a recreation ground and an area of rest for those visiting the nearby Golden temple. In 1919, it was a dried-out plot, surrounded by tightly packed multi-occupancy buildings divided by some narrow streets, and having only one entrance and exit route. It was unoccupied and surrounded by a wall. The place derives its name from the Jallianwalia family.

=== Massacre ===
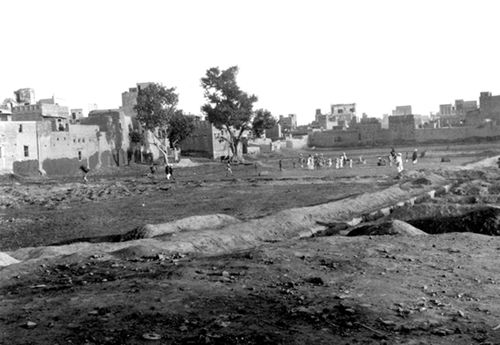
Jallianwala Bagh ( dried out plot ) in 1919

In 1919, in response to excluding Mahatma Gandhi from visiting Punjab, the secret deportation of Saifuddin Kitchlew and Satyapal on 10 April and the reactions to the Rowlatt Act, Punjab had witnessed attempts of Indians to gather and protest. On the morning of Baisakhi, 13 April 1919, to the sound of military drums by the cities town criers, Punjab Brigadier General R.E.H. Dyer's new rules were proclaimed. He had placed restrictions on leaving the city without a permit, banned all "processions of any kind" and any congregation of more than four people, and announced around the city that "any person found in the streets after 8 pm will be shot". The announcements came at a time of noise and unusual heat, and missed key locations around the city, so that they were not widely disseminated. Dyer was subsequently informed at 12.40 pm that day that a political gathering was to be held at Jallianwala Bagh. By the time Dyer arrived with 90 Sikh, Gurkha, Baloch, Rajput troops from 2-9th Gurkhas, the 54th Sikhs and the 59th Sind Rifles, there was a crowd of 20,000; a mix of speakers, listeners, picnic-makers, men, women and children of all ages, including Hindus, Sikhs, Muslims and Christians. Dyer then ordered his troops to fire at the crowds. Approximately 1,650 rounds were fired and the number, killing and injuring many; the numbers are disputed.

=== Memorial site ===
During the troubles of 1947 several surrounding buildings had been destroyed. In 1951, the government of India established the site as a 'memorial of national importance'.

The site was renovated between 2019 and 2021. The central government had earmarked ₹20 crore (US$2.1 million) in 2019 for the commemoration of the centenary of the massacre. In 1920 a Trust was formed with the aim of creating a memorial at the massacre site. The memorial was closed to the public in February 2019 for the renovation work, and reopened in August 2021. The renovation was criticized by various historians, political leaders and some of the kin of the martyrs; many said that the renovations were improper and had erased the tragedy of the massacre.

== Sites ==
=== Entrance ===
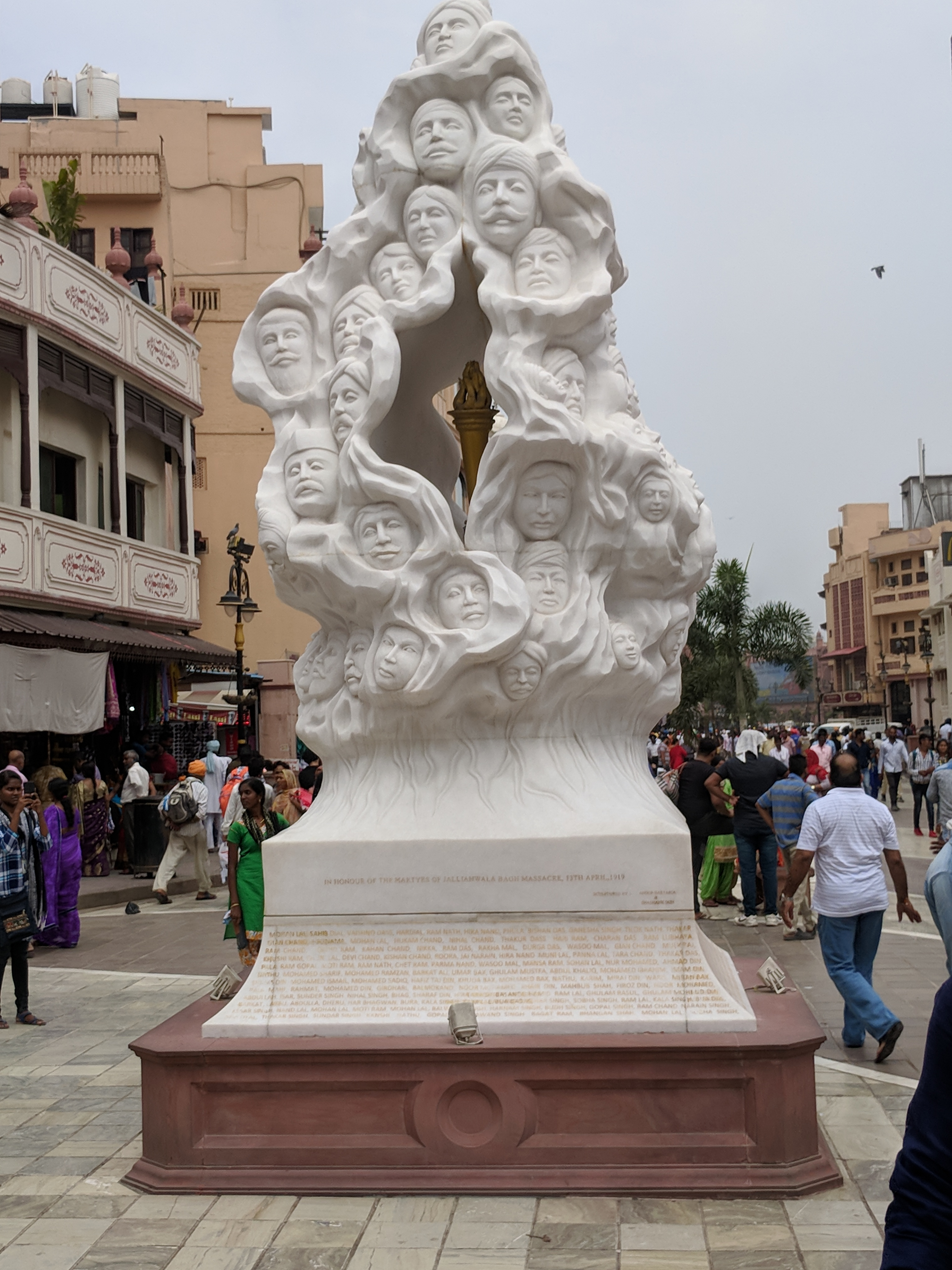
Flame titled Amar Jyoti (Eternal Flame)

The entrance to Jallianwala Bagh is via a narrow passage, the same passage that was the only entry and exit point at the time of the massacre and the same route that General Dyer and his troops took to reach the grounds. At the entrance is a statue of Udham Singh. Once entered, some old trees can be a seen in the garden with some buildings at the back. With the words 'Vande Mataram', a flame titled Amar Jyoti (Eternal Flame) is seen burning to the right under a domed meditation area.

=== Memorials ===
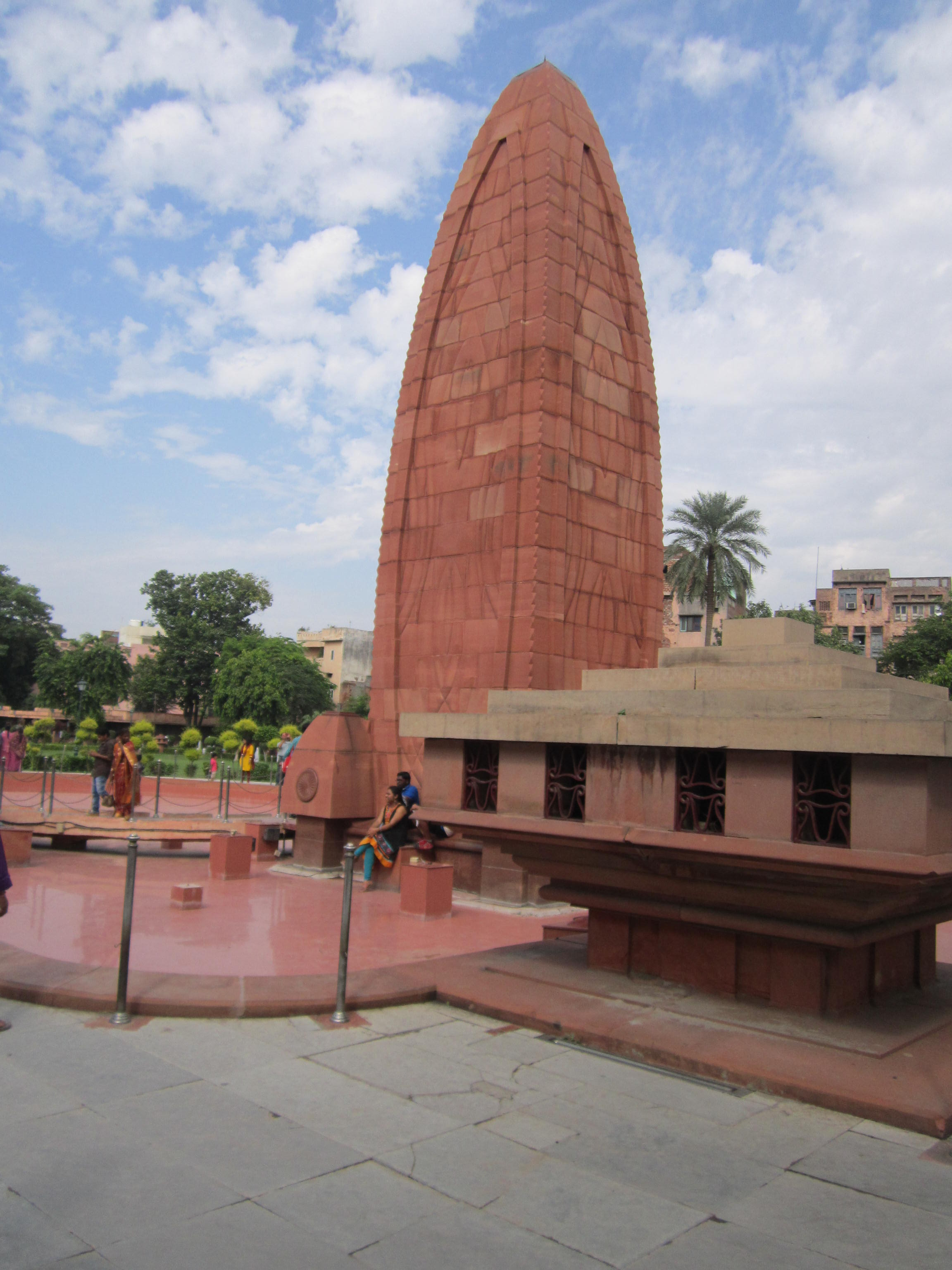
Martyr's memorial

The 'Martyrs Well' is surrounded by the Martyr's memorial, a large structure with a sign giving a figure of "120" as the number of bodies that were recovered from the well. It was designed by American architect Benjamin Polk and inaugurated in 1961.

A number of the bullet holes in the walls are preserved. One of the walls with bullet holes has a plaque reading:

The wall has its own historic significance as it has thirty-six bullet marks which can be easily seen at present and these were fired into the crowd by the order of General Dyer. Moreover, no warning was given to disperse before Dyer opened fire which was gathered here against the Rowlatt Act. One Thousand Six Hundred and Fifty Rounds were fired

Other plaques are seen inside the garden, one of which reads:

This site is saturated with the blood of thousands of Indian patriots who were martyred in a nonviolent struggle to free India from British domination. General Dyer of the British army opened fire here on unarmed people. Jallianwala Bagh is thus an everlasting symbol of non-violent & peaceful struggle for the freedom of India

The Flame of Liberty is represented by a central pylon. It is white and shaped like a flame. Engraved are faces of 'martyrs' and below are given their names.

=== The Martyr's gallery and museum ===
One of the seven urns containing the ashes of Udham Singh are kept in the museum

The Martyr's gallery contains a number of paintings including some of political leaders and a painting of the inside of Jallianwala Bagh, showing a number of people dead on the ground. The addition to the painting of the Gurkha's was painted in at a later date. The names of those killed are not included. A portrait of Udham Singh is on display in the gallery. One of the seven urns containing his ashes are kept in the museum.

Using newspaper clippings and letters from Mahatma Gandhi, Rabindranath Tagore and others, 45 panels depicting the Amritsar massacre are displayed.

== Management ==
The site is managed by the Jallianwala Bagh National Memorial Trust formed under the Jallianwala Bagh National Memorial Act, 1951 passed by the Parliament of India. The initial trustees of the Trust were named as Jawaharlal Nehru, Saifuddin Kitchlew, Maulana Abul Kalam Azad, the President of the Indian National Congress, the Governor of Punjab, the Chief Minister of Punjab and three people nominated by the Central Government.

In November 2019, the act was amended thus removing the President of the Indian National Congress as a trustee and replacing that position with the Leader of Opposition in Loksabha (lower house of Parliament) or in absence of Leader of Opposition, the leader of the single largest opposition party in the Loksabha. It also amended that a nominated trustee may be removed by the Central Government before the end of five years term.

== Site visits ==
Since the massacre, Jallianwala Bagh has been the site of a number of official and publicized visits. One of the earliest was during the public enquiry by the Indian Congress, when Jawaharlal Nehru visited the site in the immediate aftermath of the massacre. His investigation revealed 64 bullets in one part of the wall.

The site was visited by the Queen Elizabeth II in 1961, 1983 and 1997, and British Prime Minister David Cameron visited in 2013. During Prince William and Catherine's official visit to India, Jallianwala Bagh was not on their itinerary. Others from Britain include Sadiq Khan, the Mayor of London in 2017, and Dominic Asquith and the Archbishop of Canterbury, Justin Welby in 2019.

India's Prime Minister Narendra Modi visited the grounds in 2015 and politician Kiren Rijiju visited in 2016 as part of an India-Pakistan border visit. Proposed renovations to Jallianwala Bagh were presented to India’s vice president Venkaiah Naidu, the governor of Punjab V.P. Singh Badnore and other officials when they visited the site in April 2019 to attend a commemoration ceremony organised by the Ministry of Culture. Other visitors in 2019 included Rahul Gandhi.

== See also ==
- Patharighat massacre - Jallianwala of Assam
- List of massacres in India

== Bibliography ==
- Anand, Anita, The Patient Assassin: a true tale of massacre, revenge, and India's quest for independence, Simon & Schuster (2019), ISBN 978-1-5011-9570-9
- Wagner, Kim. Amritsar 1919: An Empire of Fear and the Making of a Massacre. Yale University Press (2019). ISBN 9780300200355
