= O'Dwyer v. Nair Libel Case =

1924 English court case

- Decided: 29 May 1924

Court membership
- Judge sitting: Henry McCardie

O'Dwyer v. Nair Libel Case, also known as the O'Dwyer-Nair Trial, was a libel case held in London in English law against the Indian politician and lawyer Sir C. Sankaran Nair, by former Lieutenant Governor of the Punjab, Sir Michael O'Dwyer. The case arose from statements made in Nair's 1922 book Gandhi and Anarchy, in which he criticised O'Dwyer's administration and held him responsible for the events leading to the Punjab disturbances, particularly the Jallianwala Bagh massacre of 1919.

Heard over five weeks from 30 April 1924, the case became one of the longest civil trials of its time. It was intended by O’Dwyer to justify the actions of his administration and those involved in suppressing the unrest in Punjab in 1919. The trial focused on two main questions, whether Dyer committed an atrocity at Amritsar on 13 April 1919, and whether O’Dwyer was responsible for it. The trial provided details of events in Punjab in 1919 not recorded elsewhere. Some principal participants elaborated on earlier accounts and lesser known figures involved in those events were given the opportunity to testify.

The preliminary hearing was held in October 1923 at the Lahore High Court. The case was later brought before Justice Henry McCardie in the King's Bench Division in April 1924, five years after the massacre. Though not formally on trial or present at the trial, Reginald Dyer's role in the massacre was central to the proceedings, with the case often viewed as a proxy examination of his actions in Amritsar. The jury delivered its verdict on 29 May 1924, with all jurors except Harold Laski ruling in favour of O'Dwyer. Nair was ordered to pay damages and legal costs. The outcome of the trial renewed public scrutiny of British actions in Punjab.

== Background ==
On 9 April 1919, fearing a rebellion over the effects on Indians of the Rowlatt Acts, which extended emergency powers and allowed imprisonment without trial, Lieutenant Governor of the Punjab, Sir Michael O'Dwyer barred Gandhi from entering the province of Punjab, British India, and on the same day, ordered the deportation of Amritsar's two leading local figures, Saifuddin Kitchlew and Satyapal, for the next morning. (Note: Many Indians saw these laws as a betrayal after supporting Britain in World War I.) These moves set off a series of violent outbreaks, and various punishments, that lasted more than a month and came to be known as the Punjab disturbances. Protests on 10 April turned violent, resulting in attacks on government buildings and casualties among both Indians and Europeans. On 13 April, Reginald Dyer, ordered troops to fire on a peaceful gathering at Jallianwala Bagh, resulting in the Jallianwala Bagh massacre. The unrest spread to other towns, including Gujranwala, where the following day British forces used aerial bombing to control crowds. Dyer's actions were backed by O'Dwyer, whose administration was known for its harsh measures. The Hunter Commission, set up to investigate, condemned the shootings but had no authority to impose formal punishment. Dyer was forced to retire, but not prosecuted.

In 1922 O'Dwyer was in England writing his memoir India as I Knew It, when Indian politician, lawyer, and former member of the Viceroy's Executive Council, Sir C. Sankaran Nair, published Gandhi and Anarchy. Nair's book began with criticisms of the non-cooperation movement, accusing Gandhi of being blind to the atrocities committed by Muslims against Hindus. O'Dwyer agreed with this part of the book. He wrote in his memoir, "If [Nair's] book stopped there...I would have fully supported him, as I had been advocating the same idea for three years, but for some reason, he felt the need to single me out and criticise me."

== Lawsuit ==
Before the Reforms, it was in the power of the lieutenant governor, a single individual, to commit the atrocities in the Punjab we know only too well. Nair (Gandhi and Anarchy (1922))

As a former member of the Viceroy's Council, Nair believed he had access to information that had not been made public, including two suppressed volumes of the official report into the Punjab disturbances, which gave him the confidence to place full blame on O'Dwyer. Several passages from Nair's book formed the basis of the libel case, particularly in the chapter titled 'The Punjab atrocities', regarding the suppression of the Punjab Disturbances including the Jallianwala Bagh massacre. In one instance, he criticised the powers held by colonial officials, stating that "before the Reforms it was in the power of the Lieutenant-Governor, a single individual, to commit atrocities in the Punjab." O'Dwyer was ready to take legal action for libel over this statement alone. In another part of the book, Nair attributed First World War recruitment increases to coercive methods, claiming that "the recruitment of non-Mohammedans also went up and both were due to the terrorism of Sir Michael O'Dwyer, very useful in this instance." A third passage challenged official recognition of O'Dwyer, declaring, "I realise that the eulogium passed by the English Cabinet on Lord Chelmsford and Sir Michael O'Dwyer was an outrage on public opinion."

In response, in 1923, O'Dwyer recruited London solicitors Sir William Joynson-Hicks and Co. to issue an order for defamation. Nair had refused to both retract his remarks and pay the requested £1,000 in damages. Witnesses were subsequently listed to be assessed in Lahore, with a view to a hearing in London.

== Preliminary hearing ==
The preliminary hearing took place in October 1923 at the Lahore High Court, and included sworn statements from around 125 defence witnesses based in India, including Chimanlal Harilal Setalvad and Mian Muhammad Shafi, and some from Gandhi's Congress Inquiry. (Note: Nair initially listed approximately 200 witnesses.) Nair was represented by Bakshi Tek Chand, while Sheikh Abdul Qadir served as counsel for O'Dwyer. O'Dwyer submitted a list of eight witnesses. His Indian witnesses were exclusively from the upper class, including six landowners and tribal chiefs.

Nair initially briefed Sir Patrick Hastings, but Hastings's appointment as Attorney General under the incoming Labour government prevented him from appearing. The case was then assigned to Sir John Simon, who, after reviewing the evidence, judged it damaging to O’Dwyer. On the eve of the trial, Simon telegraphed from Paris to withdraw, leaving Nair suddenly without legal representation.

== Trial ==
On 30 April 1924, in London, the case came before Justice Henry McCardie in the King's Bench Division. Ernest Charles and Hugh Fraser represented O'Dwyer. Wilson and Company Solicitors represented Nair, with Walter Schwabe, recruited the night before, as his counsel.

Nair faced a major disadvantage in the English courts of 1924. Few were willing to back his claim that O'Dwyer had been oppressive, and those who did had little public influence. Lasting five weeks, the jury was made up of three women and nine men, including the left-wing academic Harold Laski. Though Nair's Indian witnesses included 15 lawyers, 11 doctors, three educators, and six well-known businessmen, McCardie saw these as far less credible.

The trial focused on proving or disproving two main points: that the general in charge at Jallianwala Bagh, Amritsar, on 13 April 1919, Reginald Dyer's order to open fire that day was an atrocity, and that O'Dwyer was to blame or played a role in making it happen. By 1924, Dyer was too ill to attend and was using a wheelchair, though the case largely served to examine and judge his actions as if he were the one on trial.

=== Testimony ===
In Lahore, onlooking Bar members supplied newspapers with reports until 24 November 1923.

By the time of the trial, most English officials were back in Britain and able to testify, including some who had been silenced in 1919 and had not appeared before the Hunter Inquiry.

==== Nair's witnesses ====
Most of Nair's witnesses had given statements to the Indian Congress Inquiry, led by Gandhi.

List of witnesses called by Nair for trial testimony between November and December 1923 in Lahore and May 1924 in London
Surendranath Banerjee, Minister of the Bengal Government.
Defence witnesses 2, 12-year-old student from Khalsa School, Gujranwala.
Defence witnesses 3, confectioner at Khalsa High School.
Defence witnesses 5, male hit by splinter from a bomb, spent a month in hospital before being arrested.
Defence witnesses 6, 25-year-old male from Dhullia, whose nephew and sister-inlaw were killed by the aerial action.
Defence witnesses 7, male hit by splinter from a bomb.
Defence witnesses 9, student from Gujranwalla.
Defence witnesses 22, 23, 32,
Defence witness 31, cousin of Taja.
Defence witness 33, village headman.
Defence witness 53, Ganda Singh Soni, lawyer at the Lahore Court.
Ratan Devi, who lay with her dead husband at Jallianwala Bagh on 13 April 1919, was examined in court on 16 December 1923.
Tej Bhan Kumar, lawyer,
Raja Narendra Nath, the last of 125 defence witnesses.
Raizada Bhagat Ram,
Rehma, father of a son enlisted into the Army.
Chimanlal Harilal Setalvad
Sir Muhammad Shafi, Law member of the Indian Government.
Ishar Singh, son of a Jat headman from Kamoke, Gujranwala,
Gerard Wathen, former principal of Khalsa College, Amritsar.

==== O'Dwyer's witnesses ====
List of witnesses called by O'Dwyer for trial testimony between November and December 1923 in Lahore and May 1924 in London
R. B. Amarnath
Sir Chad Baksh
Mrs Bell, widow of Major Bell
William Beynon, retired British army officer and Dyer's superior, who administered martial law during the disturbances.
John T. Botting, captain in the Royal Field Artillery, who commanded British and Indian soldiers from the 12th Ammunition Column, part of the city's regular garrison. He was not called to give evidence in the Hunter inquiry.
E. P. Broadway
Burlton
Rao Bahadur Chaudhary Lal Chand, High Court of Rohtak.
Viscount Chelmsford,
Thomas Peter Ellis
Sir Patrick James Fagan
Lewis French (born 1873), I.C.S., Secretary for Military Affairs to the Punjab Government, and Secretary to the Provincial Recruiting Board.
Basil Theodore Gibson, Commissioner at Shahpur.
A. A. Irvine
Frank Johnson, British Lieutenant-General and commander of the Lahore civil area during marshall law in Punjab in 1919.
Umar Hayat Khan,
Muhamad Akbar Khan, recruiting officer in Peshawar.
A. J. W. Kitchin, former commissioner of the Lahore Division, supervised Amritsar's Deputy Commissioner, Miles Irving, and was delegated by O'Dwyer to handle the disturbances in April 1919. He was censured by the Government of India following the release of the Hunter Report, for his role on 10 April 1919.
Max Leigh, assistant commissionaer at Shahpur.
Sir John Maffey
Sir Bahram Khan Mazari,
George Carmichael Monro, Governor of Gibraltar and former commander-in-chief in India.
Sir Charles Monro, then India's Commander-in-Chief, India.
Rai Bahadur Lala Amar Nath
W. F. J. North, commanded the fort at Lahore.
Aubrey J. O'Brien, gave evidence to the Hunter Commission on martial law in Punjab and the Salaaming Order.
Khan Bahadur Sayyad Mehdi Shah
Gajjan Singh, of Ludhiana.
Henry Smith
Khuda Baksh Tiwana, of Bahawalpur.
Hubert Digby Watson,
H. S. Williamson
H. Wolley

== Closing argument and verdict ==
Speaking with full deliberation and knowing the whole of the evidence given in this case I expressed my view that General Dyer, in the grave and exceptional circumstances acted rightly and in my opinion he was wrongly punished by the Secretary of State for India. McCardie (May 1924).

At the trial's close, McCardie summed up the case by instructing the jury. He made his sympathies with Dyer clear, expressing his opinion that "Dyer, under the grave and exceptional circumstances, acted rightly, and in my opinion, upon his evidence, he was wrongly punished by the Secretary of State for India".

The jury was unable to agree on a verdict, and agreed to accept a majority decision. On 29 May 1924, except for Laski, the remaining 11 jurors voted in O'Dwyer's favour. Nair was made to pay for the cost of the trial in addition to damages. O'Dwyer received £500 and costs of £20,000.

== Response ==
The trial was widely covered in the UK's media, particularly The Times. Although O'Dwyer won the case, the trial renewed scrutiny of British actions in Punjab. McCardie's remarks drew criticism from the Government by openly discrediting the Hunter Committee's findings and reversing the government's earlier stance. Primeminister at the time, Ramsay Macdonald could have consulted the then Attorney General Patrick Hastings. For many, the verdict affirmed Dyer's actions.

A few days after the verdict, E. M. Forster published A Passage to India and in resentment to the verdict sent McCardie a copy.

Nair's book in vernacular was withdrawn by the British Government following the verdict.

In 2025, Karan Singh Tyagi's adaptation of the trial featured in the Indian film Kesari Chapter 2, based on the book The Case That Shook The Empire by Raghu Palat and Pushpa Palat.

== Significance ==
The case is significant for its trial records, which provide details of the events in Punjab in 1919 not recorded elsewhere, with some of the principal participants elaborating on earlier accounts and lesser known figures involved in those events given the opportunity to testify. According to Nigel Collett, the trial brought forward new evidence, with witness testimony shedding light on the attitude of sections of the Indian establishment towards the suppression of the Punjab disturbances, and the quality of intelligence available to the Government of India. It suggests that some Indians, whose positions depended on continued British rule, not only accepted the suppression but actively supported it.

The trial possibly influenced Sir Arthur Currie in pursuing a libel case in 1927–28.

== Bibliography ==
- Lentin, Antony (2016). "3. Storm over Amritsar". Mr Justice McCardie (1869-1933): Rebel, Reformer, and Rogue Judge. Cambridge Scholars Publishing. pp. 54–73. ISBN 978-1-4438-9780-8.
- Palat, Raghu; Palat, Pushpa (2019). The Case That Shook the Empire: One Man's Fight for the Truth about the Jallianwala Bagh Massacre. New Delhi: Bloomsbury Publishing. ISBN 978-93-89000-29-0.
