= Fancy punishments =

1919 scandal in the British Indian Army

In 1919, during martial law in Punjab, following the Jallianwalla Bagh Massacre, some odd humiliating punishments were administered by the British Indian Army, dubbed fancy punishments by the Hunter Inquiry into the disturbances.

== Background ==
Martial law was introduced in Punjab at midnight between 15 and 16 April 1919 and backdated to 30 March on 21 April by the Viceroy, at the request of Michael O'Dwyer.

== Punishments ==
Designed to humiliate, several punishments, dubbed as "fancy" in the Disorders Inquiry Committee, 1919–1920: Report (Hunter Inquiry), were invented by A. C. Doveton, and included making people skip, draw lines on the ground with their nose, calling out poetry, flogging men in front of female sex-workers, and allegedly painting holy men white. Others involved included Henry St. George Murray Mcrae, Bertrand Bosworth-Smith, and district commissioner at Gujranwalla, A. J. O'Brien. Reginald Dyer gave the order for all lawyers in Amritsar to become "special constables", with the task of menial work including sweeping. O'Brien punished Indians who failed to raise their umbrellas, step down from their vehicles, or salute, at the presence of a "gazetted or commissioned European Civil and Military officer of his Majesty's Service".

== See also ==
- Salaaming Order
- Crawling Order
