= Salaaming Order =

The Salaaming Order, also known as the Saluting Order, introduced by British General Leslie Campbell on 22 April 1919, and also issued by A. C. Doveton, was an instruction during martial law in Punjab 1919 following the Jallianwalla Bagh Massacre. It required Indians to salute British personnel or face punishment including arrest, detention, and flogging. Others found to be leading the order included Aubrey J. O'Brien, B. N. Bosworth-Smith. and Henry St. George Murray Mcrae.

Along with the co-existing Crawling Order, created by Reginald Dyer, and fancy punishments invented by Doveton, the order was investigated by the official Hunter Commission and the independent National Congress's inquiry.

An account is depicted in the book A Passage to India.

== Background ==
Martial law was introduced in Punjab at midnight between 15 and 16 April 1919 and backdated to 30 March on 21 April by the Viceroy, at the request of Michael O'Dwyer.
