= Leslie Warner Yule Campbell =

Leslie Warner Yule Campbell CMG
- Born: 24 August 1867; Lee, UK
- Died: 26 July 1946 (aged 78); Kent, UK
- Military career
- Allegiance: (United Kingdom) British Empire
- Rank: Brigadier general
- Unit: 89th Punjabis
- Conflicts: Tirah campaign; World War I; Invasion of Cheikh Said; Gallipoli campaign; Raid on the Suez Canal; Battle of Loos; Siege of Kut; Fall of Baghdad (1917); Third Anglo-Afghan War
- Awards: Order of the White Eagle (Serbia)

Brigadier-General Leslie Warner Yule Campbell CMG (24 August 1867 – 26 July 1946) was a British Indian Army officer. He served as a press correspondent during the Tirah campaign, and was commandant 89th Punjabis in the First World War, participating in the Invasion of Cheikh Said, the Gallipoli campaign, the raid on the Suez Canal, Battle of Loos, Siege of Kut, siege of Baghdad, and action at Jabal Al Harim. He later saw action in the Third Anglo-Afghan War. In 1919 during martial law in Punjab, he created the Salaaming Order.

== Early life and education ==
Leslie Campbell was born in Lee, Kent, on 24 August 1867, one of six children to Alexander Henry Edward Campbell and his wife Sarah Eliza (née Clarke). Some of his childhood was spent in Boulogne-sur-Mer, where he had his early schooling. Between 1882 and 1885 he attended Cheltenham College, before gaining a place at Royal Military College, Sandhurst.

== Military career ==
In 1886, Campbell was commissioned as a lieutenant in the King's Own Scottish Borderers, later transferring to the Sherwood Foresters. In 1888, he joined the Madras Staff Corps as a lieutenant, later attaining the rank of captain in the Indian Staff Corps in 1897. During a period of leave, he served as a press correspondent in the Tirah campaign between October 1897 and April 1898, under Generals William Lockhart and Richard Westmacott. From October 1902 to May 1904, he was employed as senior military administrator for musketry, and from 1 June 1904 until 1907, he held the position of Brigade Major.

In the First World War, Campbell served as Commandant of the 89th Punjabis, participating in the Invasion of Cheikh Said, as well as the Gallipoli campaign, the raid on the Suez Canal, Battle of Loos, Siege of Kut, siege of Baghdad, and action at Jabal Al Harim. He later saw action in the Third Anglo-Afghan War.

In 1918, Campbell was stationed in Sialkot as general officer commanding (GOC). The following year he was in charge of martial law at Gujarat, Gujranwala, and Lyallpur, when he issued the Salaaming Order, requiring Indians to salute British officers. The order was condemned by the Hunter Commission as humiliating, and Campbell was censured by the British Government. In the official inquiry following the Jallianwalla Bagh Massacre and other Punjab disturbances, he was not called as a witness before the Hunter Committee, though his colleagues including Aubrey J. O'Brien and A. C. Doveton defended his actions. He retired in December 1921 and moved back to England, where he bought Badshot House in Badshot Lea.

== Personal and family ==
In 1890 in Vellore, Campbell married Marjorie Merial Wroughton, with whom he had six children, two who died young. Marjorie died from cancer in 1911, and 16 years later he married a widow known as Cilla.

== Honours and awards ==
Campbell was mentioned in dispatches four times in total. In 1916 he was awarded the Order of St Michael and St George. The following year he received the Serbian Order of the White Eagle, third class (with swords).

== Death ==
Campbell died in Surrey, on 26 July 1946.
