= Gandhi and Anarchy =

Book by Sir C. Sankaran Nair 1922

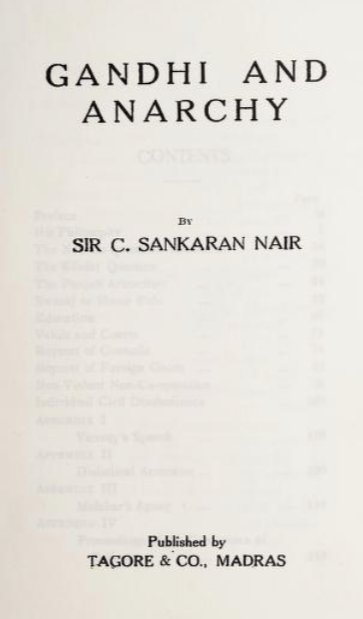
- Title page for Gandhi and Anarchy (1922)
- Author: C. Sankaran Nair
- Language: English
- Subject: Mahatma Gandhi, anarchism in India
- Published: 1922
- Publication place: India

Gandhi and Anarchy is a book authored by Sir C. Sankaran Nair and published in 1922. Writing India as I Knew It and in response to its publication, Sir Michael O'Dwyer sued Nair in the O'Dwyer v. Nair Libel Case.

== See also ==
- Kesari Chapter 2, 2025 Indian film about the libel case, based on the book The Case that Shook the Empire
