= An Imaginary Rebellion and How It was Suppressed =

Book written by Pearay Mohan in 1920

An Imaginary Rebellion and How It was Suppressed: An Account of the Punjab Disorders and the Working Martial Law
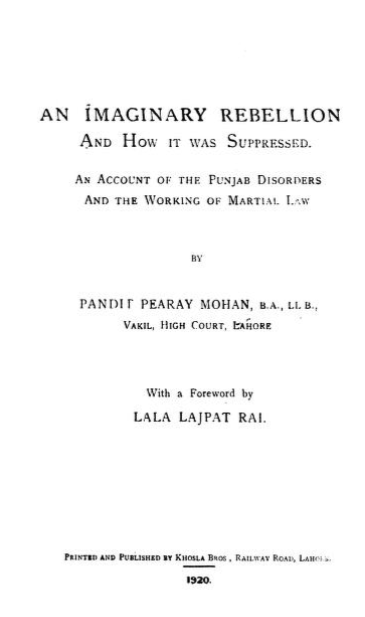
- Title page for An Imaginary Rebellion and How It was Suppressed (1920)
- Author: Pearay Mohan
- Language: English
- Published: 1920
- Publisher: Khosla Brothers
- Publication place: India

An Imaginary Rebellion and How It was Suppressed: An Account of the Punjab Disorders and the Working of Martial Law is a book written by Pearay Mohan, an Indian lawyer and assistant editor of The Tribune. It was published by Khosla Brothers in 1920, shortly after the release of the Indian Congress report on the Punjab disturbances of 1919. Included in it is a foreword by the Indian revolutionary, Lala Lajpat Rai.

== Publication ==
An Imaginary Rebellion and How It was Suppressed by Pearay Mohan, was first published by Khosla Brothers of Lahore in 1920, shortly after the release of B. G. Horniman's book Amritsar and Our Duty to India (1920), about the Jallianwalla Bagh Massacre of April 1919, and the Indian Congress report on the Punjab disturbances of 1919. It was reprinted in two volumes by Gyan Publishing House in 1999, and edited by Ravi M. Bakaya, under the new title of The Punjab Rebellion of 1919 and How It was Suppressed.

== Content ==
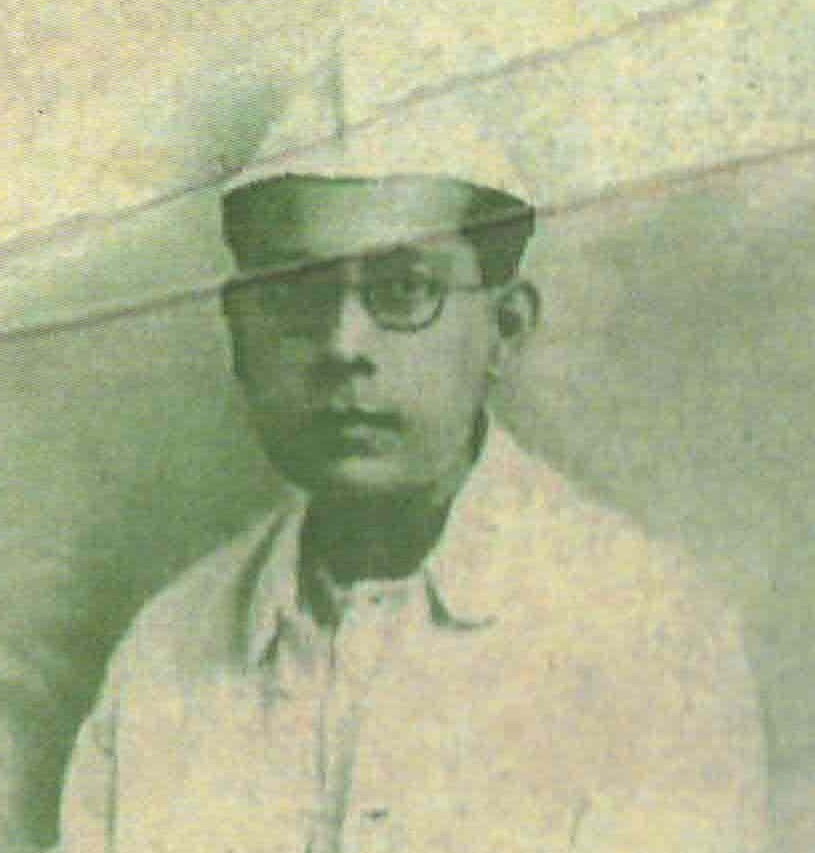
Pearay Mohan in the 1999 reprint

Written in December 1919, the book has three chapters, preceded by a preface by the author and a foreword by the Indian revolutionary, Lala Lajpat Rai, and followed by seven appendices and a supplement. In it, Mohan describes the tragedy at Punjab as a series of five acts; the lead up to the disturbances led by Sir Michael O'Dwyer, events of 10 April 1919 at Amritsar, the massacres, the exaggeration of mob violence and attempt to claim a rebellion, and the fifth act which was yet to occur.

Included in the text is Mohan's theory of the approver Hans Raj working with the British to gather crowds at Jallianwalla Bagh shortly prior to the massacre there. According to Mohan, the Punjab disturbances were a result of the harsh methods in recruiting labour from the villages.

The 1999 reprint contains an additional introduction by Bipan Chandra, editor's note, a short biography of Mohan, and an image of him from his family album.

== Response and reviews ==
Upon its publication in 1920, the book was immediately banned and copies confiscated by the British government in India.

British historian Mark Condos, in his book The Insecurity State (2017) described the titile as "provocative" and the book in general as "sensational and incendiary". The Tribune called the book "a virtual encyclopaedia on Punjab under martial law in 1919 ".
