= Herbert Herbert =

British ophthalmologist

- Born: 25 February 1865; Tranmere, Cheshire
- Died: 19 March 1942 (aged 77); Rugby, Warwickshire
- Education: Leeds Medical School
- Known for: Reports on cholera epidemics; Herbert's pits in trachoma; Sclerotomy in glaucoma
- Medical career
- Profession: Surgeon
- Field: Ophthalmology
- Institutions: Grant Medical College; Midland Eye Infirmary; Worthing Hospital

Lieutenant-Colonel Herbert Herbert, FRCS (25 February 1865 – 19 March 1942) was a British ophthalmologist and officer in the Indian Medical Service (IMS), known for his work on trachoma, cataract and glaucoma. Later, he was vice-president of the Ophthalmological Society of the UK.

Herbert was commissioned with the IMS in 1887, and served in the Middle East and the Gulf of Aden in 1890, as surgeon. He became a Fellow of the Royal College of Surgeons in 1891, and around that time took an interest in diseases of the eye. In 1892, he was appointed professor at the Grant Medical College (GMC) and first surgeon at the Jamshedjee Jeejeebhoy Hospital (JJ Hospital). The following year, he became civil surgeon at Kheda, Gujarat. In India, he reported on cholera epidemics and his papers included "Rainfall and Seasonal Cholera" (1894) and "The Natural History of Hardwar Fair Cholera Outbreaks" (1895). In 1897 he was ophthalmic surgeon to JJ Hospital and professor of ophthalmic surgery at GMC. He described "the pits" in people with trachoma, the "trap-door" method of sclerotomy in glaucoma, features of superficial punctate keratitis, and was the first to document the presence of eosinophils in conjunctivitis.

He returned to England following retirement in 1907, and was appointed at first surgeon then consulting surgeon to the Midland Eye Infirmary, Nottingham. He rejoined the IMS during the First World War and held posts on hospital ships, at the Indian Hospital at Brockenhurst, and in India. After the war, he settled in Sussex and continued to consult in matters of the eye, to the Worthing Hospital, and in pathology to the Sussex Eye Hospital, Brighton.

== Early life and education ==
Herbert Herbert, born Herbert Sherwood, was born on 25 February 1865 at Tranmere, Cheshire, to Richard Sherwood, a barrister and judge, and his second relationship with Alice Sherwood, following three children with his first wife. His surname was changed to Herbert at the age of 12, and the circumstances of his father, and his father's first marriage and relationship with his mother, are unclear. It is possible that Alice Sherwood was really Alice Herbert, who then fell out with Richard Sherwood, possibly because he would not marry her, and then changed her son's surname to her own. Unable to change his Christian name, he became 'Herbert Herbert'. He attended school at Liverpool and gained admission to study medicine at the Leeds Medical School. In 1886 he took the English Conjoint qualification. In the same year, he gained membership of the Royal College of Surgeons and the licentiate of the Royal College of Physicians.

== Early career ==
On 31 March 1887, Herbert was commissioned with the IMS, and served in Middle East and the Gulf of Aden in 1890, as surgeon. He became Fellow of the Royal College of Surgeons in 1891, and around that time took an interest in eye diseases. He remained on military duty until 1892, when he was appointed professor at the Grant Medical College (GMC) and first surgeon at the Jamshedjee Jeejeebhoy Hospital (JJ Hospital). The following April, he became civil surgeon at Kheda, Gujarat, where he was appointed to the district's central prison.

He published reports on the cholera epidemics of the 19th century. In 1894, as surgeon-captain at Rajkot, he read his paper "Rainfall and Seasonal Cholera" at the International Congress of Hygiene at Budapest. It was discussed later that year at the first Indian Medical Congress held at St. Xavier's College, Calcutta. In 1895, he published "The Natural History of Hardwar Fair Cholera Outbreaks", a paper suggesting that predominantly three factors led to cholera epidemics during the Kumbh Mela at Haridwar. These were; polluting of the waters by an extraordinary large number of people relative to the amount of available water, growth of the Vibrio cholerae aided by intense hot weather, and a particularly greater virulence of the cholera bacteria in other parts of India.

In 1897 he was ophthalmic surgeon to JJ Hospital and professor of ophthalmic surgery at GMC. On 31 March 1899, he became major. On 31 March 1907, he was promoted to lieutenant-colonel. While he was in India, he described features in trachoma. In 1903, Herbert was the first to demonstrate "the pits" in people with trachoma. He described the "trap-door" method of sclerotomy in glaucoma, published one of the earliest papers on superficial punctate keratitis, and was the first to document the presence of eosinophils in conjunctivitis (vernal catarrh). He also wrote on cataract.

== Later career ==
On 20 October 1907, Herbert retired, and the following year he returned to England, where he was appointed at first surgeon then consulting surgeon to the Midland Eye Infirmary, Nottingham. He rejoined the IMS during the First World War. Between October 1914 and 1 April 1919, he held posts on hospital ships, at the Indian Hospital at Brockenhurst, and in India. After the war he resided at 6 Southview Drive, West Worthing, Sussex. He continued to consult in matters of the eye, to the Worthing Hospital, and in pathology to the Sussex Eye Hospital, Brighton.

He was a vice-president of the Ophthalmological Society of the United Kingdom.

== Personal and family ==
He married in 1899, and they had two sons and two daughters. Two of his children studied medicine.

== Death and legacy ==
Herbert died at the age of 77 on 19 March 1942 in Rugby. "Herbert's pits" in the cornea of people with trachoma are named for him.

He is considered one of the four ophthalmology pioneers of the IMS, the others being Henry “Jullundur” Smith, Robert Henry Elliot and Robert E. Wright.

== Selected publications ==
Herbert's books on cataract surgery were founded on his experience of 5,000 extractions performed in India.

=== Articles ===
- Herbert H I M S (September 1894). "Rainfall and Seasonal Cholera in India*To be read at the International Congress of Hygiene at Budapest". The Indian Medical Gazette. 29 (9): 329–332. ISSN 0019-5863. PMC 5197332. PMID 29001598.
- Herbert, H. (November 1894). "Atmospheric Pressure and Cholera in India". The Indian Medical Gazette. 29 (11): 415–418. ISSN 0019-5863. PMC 5197383. PMID 29001640.
- Herbert H I M S (August 1895). "The Natural History of Hardwar Fair Cholera Outbreaks". The Indian Medical Gazette. 30 (8): 298–300. ISSN 0019-5863. PMC 5142980. PMID 29002058.
- Herbert, H. (July 1894). "Note on Cholera in the Berar Province". The Indian Medical Gazette. 29 (7): 245. ISSN 0019-5863. PMC 5197171. PMID 29001474.
- "Superficial punctate keratitis associated with an encapsuled bacillus". Ophthalmology Reviews, 1901, Vol. 20, p. 339.
- "The micro-organism of Indian superficial punctate keratitis". British Journal of Ophthalmology, 1931, Vol. 15, p. 633.

=== Books ===
- The practical details of cataract extraction. London, 1902; 2nd edition, 1903.
- Cataract extraction. London, 1908.
- The operative treatment of glaucoma. London, 1923.
