= Henry "Jullundur" Smith =

Henry Smith
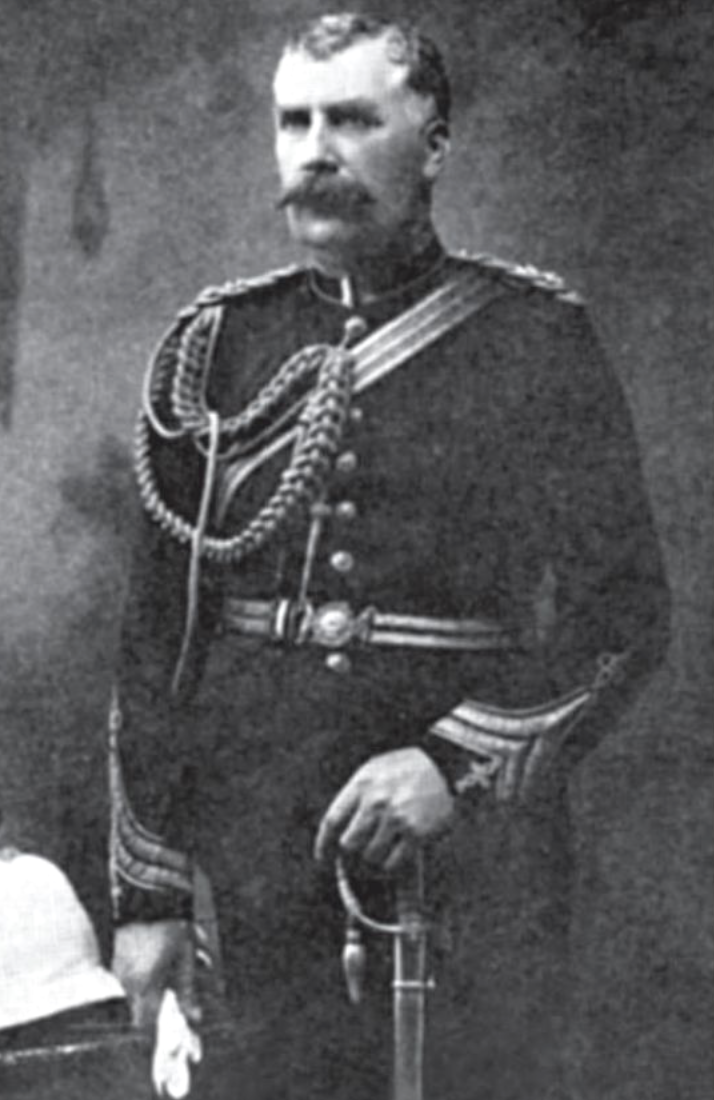
- Lieutenant colonel Henry Smith
- Born: 1859; Clogher, County Tyrone
- Died: 1948 (aged 88–89)
- Education: Queen's College, Galway
- Known for: Cataract surgery
- Medical career
- Profession: Surgeon
- Field: Ophthalmology
- Sub-specialties: Cataract surgery

Signature
- Military career
- Allegiance: British Raj
- Branch: Indian medical Service
- Rank: Lieutenant colonel

Lieutenant Colonel Henry Smith, known popularly as Harry and Henry “Jullundur” Smith, (1859-1948), was an Irish ophthalmologist who served as Civil Surgeon in Punjab's Indian Medical Service (IMS), mostly in Jullundur and Amritsar, where he was also superintendent of the local jail.

In 1905 Smith published a landmark paper titled “Extraction of cataract in the capsule”. Smith's operation, an operation for removing cataracts with the capsule intact, is named for him. A description of Smith is given in Derrick Vail's “The Man With the Cigar” (1973).

== Early life and education ==
Henry Smith, also known as Harry, was born in Clogher, County Tyrone, in 1859. He attended Queen's College, Galway, from where he graduated with first class honours.

== Career ==
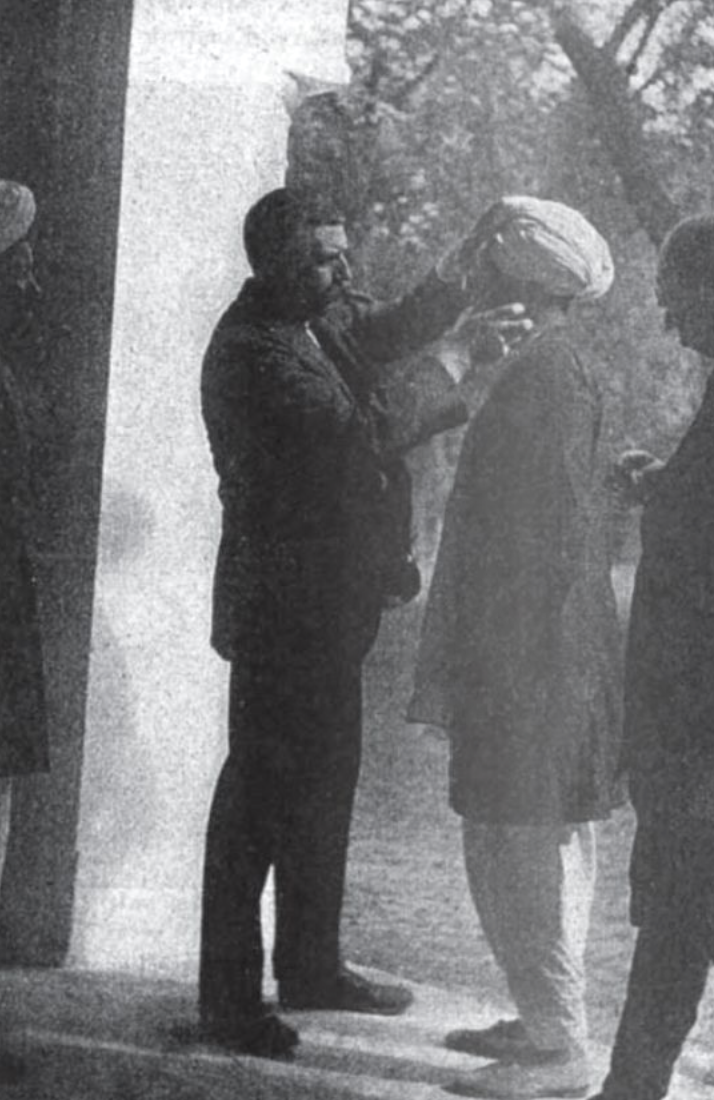
Henry "Jullundur" Smith

In 1890 Smith joined the Indian Medical Service, and was stationed at Amritsar and Jullundur, Punjab, where he became known as "Jullundur Smith", acting as the chief IMS officer, superintendent of the local jail, and performing both stone and eye surgery. During the cooler seasons, he could perform up to 100 cataract operations per day. He popularised the intracapsular cataract extraction.

== Later life ==
In March 1919, Smith secretly advised Sir Michael O'Dwyer, bypassing the newly appointed deputy commissioner, Miles Irving, advocating harsh measures in Amritsar and prompting O'Dwyer to escalate tensions that culminated on 10 April. He later gave testimony to the Hunter Inquiry into the Punjab disturbances of 1919. Following the Punjab disturbances of 1919, he was furloughed in 1920.

In 1921 Smith retired to Clogher. In 1924 he was called by Sir Michael O'Dwyer to testify in the O'Dwyer v. Nair Libel Case. He returned to India in 1924 spending a year re-editing his ophthalmology book.

== Personal and family ==
In 1898, Smith married Hester Dil Russel, an Indian Medical Service colleague. They had two sons.

== Death and legacy ==
Smith died in 1948. The Indian Pioneer wrote: "He was big, mentally, morally and physically and he operated on thousands upon thousands for two great Indian afflictions, cataract and stone. India mourns his going, the world honours him." He is considered an ophthalmology pioneer of the IMS, along with Herbert Herbert. A description of Smith is given in Derrick Vail's “The Man With the Cigar” (1973).

== Selected publications ==
- Smith, H. (July 1910). "Extraction of Cataract in the Capsule". The Indian Medical Gazette. 45 (7): 249–251. ISSN 0019-5863. PMC 5140333. PMID 29004448.
- Smith, H. (November 1914). "The Treatment of the Earlier Stages of Senile Cataract". The Indian Medical Gazette. 49 (11): 430–433. ISSN 0019-5863. PMC 5181185. PMID 29006226.
- Smith, H. (May 1915). "Progress in the Treatment of Cataract in India". The Indian Medical Gazette. 50 (5): 161–163. ISSN 0019-5863. PMC 5149746. PMID 29006928.
- Smith, H. (September 1915). "Acidosis and Oedema in Its Relation to Glaucoma". The Indian Medical Gazette. 50 (9): 333–334. ISSN 0019-5863. PMC 5149821. PMID 29006961.
- Smith, H. (January 1916). "Conjunctival Flaps in Cataract Operations". The Indian Medical Gazette. 51 (1): 11–13. ISSN 0019-5863. PMC 5179899. PMID 29008193.

== Bibliography ==
- Wagner, Kim A. (2019). Amritsar 1919: An Empire of Fear & the Making of a Massacre. Yale University Press. ISBN 978-0-300-24546-2.
