= A. J. W. Kitchin =

Arthur James Warburton Kitchin CIE (1870 – 1957) was a British officer in the Indian Civil Service (ICS), who served mainly in Punjab, where he held the post of commissioner of the division of Lahore.

Kitchin was delegated by Sir Michael O'Dwyer to manage the Punjab disturbances in April 1919. He was later censured by the Government of India, following the Jallianwalla Bagh Massacre and the Hunter Inquiry, for his actions in Amritsar on 10 April 1919 and for allowing Dyer to assume authority. He later gave evidence in support of O’Dwyer during the 1924 O'Dwyer v. Nair Libel Case.

== Early life and family ==
Arthur Kitchin was born in 1870, the youngest son of Rev. Joseph Laxton Kitchin of Teignmouth, Devon. He was educated at Clifton College, and subsequently gained a maths scholarship to Pembroke College, University of Cambridge, passing the ICS examination in 1892.

Kitchin married Mildred Sarah Maria Murray on 21 November 1907.

== Career ==
Kitchin joined the ICS in November 1893 and reached India on 4 January 1894. He served in Punjab as assistant commissioner in Rawalpindi, Jhelum, and Murree, and became assistant commissioner on settlement duty from November 1901 before becoming Deputy Commissioner in March 1904. He was made a Companion of the Order of the Indian Empire in 1917. The following year he was appointed secretary to the Punjab Publicity Bureau.

=== Punjab disturbances ===
As commissioner of the Lahore Division (included Amritsar) in 1919, Kitchin supervised Amritsar's deputy commissioner, Miles Irving, and was delegated by Sir Michael O'Dwyer to handle the Punjab disturbances in April 1919. In response, Kitchin made his own assessment of Amritsar and on 11 April 1919 called Sir William Beynon to recruit an officer "not afraid to act". At Beynon's instruction Lieutenant-Colonel M. H. L. Morgan was dispatched from the city of Lahore, but Reginald Dyer reached Amritsar first and took control, side-lining Morgan. On 13 April 1919, Kitchin was back in Lahore but following Dyer's actions at the Jallianwalla Bagh, where without warning Dyer ordered the shooting of a large unarmed crowd, Kitchin was ordered back to Amritsar the following day. Dyer then told him: "'I have done my duty. It was a horrible duty. I haven't slept all night but it was the right thing to do." Kitchin was censured by the Government of India following the release of the Hunter Report, for his role in Amritsar, when he handed control of the city to the military without giving clear instructions, and letting Dyer take over authority. Kitchin told the court that fears about the loyalty of Indian troops partly shaped his interpretation of Dyer’s conduct at Jallianwala Bagh, an explanation that neither Dyer nor Sir Havelock Hudson, Adjutant-General in India, endorsed. Kitchin stated "I am content to put it forward as a factor operating on my own mind. It was an argument put forward by practically every Indian who came to us. They all said that we could not trust the troops."

== Later life ==
Kitchin retired in 1921 and returned to England. In 1924 he gave testimony on behalf of O'Dwyer in the O'Dwyer v. Nair Libel Case. He died in 1957.

== Selected publications ==
- Final report of the revision of the settlement of the Rawalpindi district in the Punjab. Lahore, Civil and Military Gazette Press. 1909.

== Bibliography ==
- Wagner, Kim A. (2019). Amritsar 1919: An empire of fear & the making of a massacre. Yale University Press. ISBN 978-0-300-24546-2.
