= Arnold Chadwick Doveton =

- Born: 20 March 1884; Bath, Somerset
- Died: 1959 (aged 74–75)
- Military career
- Allegiance: United Kingdom
- Branch: Indian Army
- Conflicts: First World War

Arnold Chadwick Doveton (20 March 1884 – 1959) was a British Indian Army officer with the 21st Punjabis and later the 15th Punjab Regiment. During martial law in 1919, he was posted to Kasur, where he became known for inventing and administering fancy punishments to Indians who failed to salute British officers.

== Biography ==
Arnold Doveton, commonly recorded as A. C. Doveton, was born into a military family on 20 March 1884, in Bath, Somerset. He was commissioned into the British Indian Army as a Second Lieutenant in 1905, joined the 21st Punjabis the following year, and by 1913 was promoted to Captain.

During martial law in Punjab in 1919, Doveton was posted to Kasur, where he became known for inventing and administering fancy punishments to Indians who failed to salute British officers. His actions were questioned by the Hunter Committee, set up to investigate the Punjab disturbances. According to H. St. G. M. McRae, Doveton was responsible for the whipping of several schoolboys in Kasur.

In 1923 Doveton advanced to Major in the 15th Punjab Regiment. In 1924 he was appointed magistrate at Meerut. He retired from service in 1927 and returned to his birthplace, where he lived until his death in 1959.

== See also ==
- Aubrey J. O'Brien
