= Karan Singh Tyagi =

Indian lawyer and filmmaker

- Education: Government Law College, Mumbai; Harvard Law School
- Occupations: Lawyer; Writer; Film director
- Known for: Kesari Chapter 2 (2025)
- Awards: IFFI Best Debut Director Award (2025)

Karan Singh Tyagi (born c. 1985) is an Indian lawyer and writer, best known as co-writer and director of the 2025 Hindi film Kesari Chapter 2.

== Early life and education ==
Karan Singh Tyagi was born in 1985 or 1986. He was brought up in Meerut, India, before completing a law degree from the Government Law College, Mumbai. He later graduated from Harvard Law School.

== Early career and film ==
After working at law firms in Paris and New York, Tyagi took a sabbatical in 2015 to explore filmmaking in Mumbai. Following his experience on Vishal Bhardwaj's Rangoon, he took to screenwriting.

Tyagi directed the 2025 Hindi film Kesari Chapter 2. The film was adapted from Sir C. Sankaran Nair's grandson's 2019 book The Case That Shook The Empire based on the aftermath of the 1919 Jallianwala Bagh Massacre and the 1924 O'Dwyer v. Nair Libel Trial.

== Awards ==
In 2025 Tyagi received the IFFI Best Debut Director Award for Kesari Chapter 2 at the 56th International Film Festival of India.
