= Kesari Chapter 2 =

2025 Indian film by Karan Singh Tyagi

- Theatrical release poster
- Directed by: Karan Singh Tyagi
- Written by: Karan Singh Tyagi; Amritpal Singh Bindra
- Dialogues by: Akshat Ghildial
- Based on: The Case That Shook The Empire by Raghu Palat and Pushpa Palat
- Produced by: Hiroo Yash Johar; Aruna Bhatia; Karan Johar; Adar Poonawalla; Apoorva Mehta; Amritpal Singh Bindra; Anand Tiwari
- Starring: Akshay Kumar; R. Madhavan; Ananya Panday; Regena Cassandrra
- Narrated by: Vicky Kaushal
- Cinematography: Debojeet Ray
- Edited by: Nitin Baid
- Music by: Shashwat Sachdev
- Production companies: Dharma Productions; Leo Media Collective; Cape of Good Films
- Distributed by: Dharma Productions
- Release date: 18 April 2025
- Running time: 135 minutes
- Country: India
- Language: Hindi
- Budget: ₹150 crore
- Box office: ₹142–144.35 crore

Kesari Chapter 2: The Untold Story of Jallianwala Bagh is a 2025 Indian Hindi-language historical courtroom drama film directed by Karan Singh Tyagi and produced by Dharma Productions, Leo Media Collective, and Cape of Good Films. A spiritual sequel to Kesari (2019), the plot is based on the book The Case That Shook The Empire by Raghu Palat and Pushpa Palat, which is centered around C. Sankaran Nair and the 1919 Jallianwala Bagh massacre. The film stars Akshay Kumar as Nair alongside R. Madhavan, Ananya Panday and Regena Cassandrra.

Kesari Chapter 2 was released on 18 April 2025, coinciding with the 106th anniversary of the Jallianwala Bagh massacre. The film received positive reviews from both critics and the audience alike, but underperformed at the box office. At the 56th IFFI 2025 it fetched the Best Debut Film of a Director trophy.

== Plot ==
The film opens with a stark depiction of the Jallianwala Bagh massacre, where Brigadier-General Reginald Dyer orders his soldiers to fire upon a peaceful gathering of civilians in Amritsar. Hundreds are slaughtered, and one of the few survivors is a teenage boy, Pargat Singh, who loses his mother and sister during the carnage. The British suppress all truthful reporting, destroying issues of Punjab Samachar that documented the real events, and falsely claim that the victims were violent rebels who attacked the army—despite no soldiers being harmed. The narrative then turns to C. Sankaran Nair, a distinguished barrister and member of the Viceroy's Council, was recently knighted by the British Crown. Nair meets Pargat after the massacre and urges him to abandon violent rebellion and return to school. Later, he hears that Pargat has “committed suicide.” Nair is assigned by the colonial government to investigate the massacre, with the expectation of delivering a report favouring the British. However, law student Dilreet Gill secretly retrieves a surviving issue of the Punjab Samachar and shows it to Nair, exposing the truth of Dyer's brutality.

Realizing the enormity of the crime, Nair condemns Dyer before the Viceroy's Council, but his objections are ignored, and he is warned not to challenge the Crown. Feeling complicit in Pargat's fate for discouraging him, Nair—guided by Gill—decides to sue the British government and General Dyer for genocide. In the first legal confrontation, he wins, causing Dyer to consider killing him, but others advise against attacking a man of Nair's rank. Dyer then hires Neville McKinley, a resentful Anglo-Indian lawyer, to represent the Crown in the Trial Court. An intense courtroom battle follows. The prosecution introduces Martha Stevens, a music teacher who alleges that she was raped. Public sentiment turns against Nair for defending the accused man. However, Nair and Gill uncover evidence proving that Stevens was never raped; instead, she was coerced into lying because she had a consensual romantic relationship with the man. In court, Gill cleverly manipulates her into admitting her feelings, revealing the truth. This restores Nair's credibility and leads him to another victory, during which he nearly provokes Dyer into confessing his guilt.

But McKinley counters with a strategic blow—he accuses Nair of illegally accessing confidential government files while collecting evidence. Nair is convicted and sentenced to seclusion, preventing him from influencing the final judgment. The government is acquitted. Broken and disheartened, Nair returns home only to receive a letter from imprisoned rebel Kripal Singh, father of Pargat, revealing that the British officials murdered Pargat and did not commit suicide. Enraged, Nair drags Gill back into the fight. When the court rejects his challenge, he deliberately violates contempt of court to escalate the matter to higher authorities. Dyer and McKinley expect his public humiliation, but Nair exposes that the jury's verdict was not unanimous. He brings forward the only honest juror—the other two having been bribed—who testifies in his favor. Although Nair is ultimately debarred from practice, his revelations reach the media and ignite a wave of patriotic resistance, ensuring that the truth of the massacre can no longer be buried.

== Cast ==
- Akshay Kumar as Justice Chettoor Sankaran Nair
- R. Madhavan as Adv. Neville McKinley
- Ananya Panday as Dilreet Gill
- Regena Cassandrra as Parvathy Nair, Sankaran Nair's wife
- Simon Paisley Day as Reginald Dyer
- Alexx O'Nell as Lord Chelmsford
- Amit Sial as Tirath Singh
- Deepak Antani as Mahatma Gandhi
- Mark Bennington as Michael O'Dwyer
- Sammy Jonas Heaney as Harold Laski
- Steven Hartley as Judge McCardie
- Krish Rao as Pargat Singh
- Rohan Verma as Jaan Nisar
- Alexandra Moloney as Martha Stevens
- Jaipreet Singh as Kirpal Singh
- Luke Kenny as Appeal Court Judge
- Atul Kumar as Crown's lawyer
- Masaba Gupta as a dancer in the song "Khumaari" (special appearance)

== Production ==
=== Development ===
The film was initially titled Shankara, before being renamed Kesari Chapter 2 in February 2025 to establish a thematic link with Kesari (2019). It was officially announced by Karan Johar on 22 March 2025. It is based on the life of C. Sankaran Nair, an Indian lawyer and statesman who fought against the British Raj to uncover the truth about the Jallianwala Bagh massacre, the 1919 massacre of Indian protesters in Amritsar by General Dyer. Advocate Neville McKinley was a fictional character that was an amalgamation of ten different historical figures.

=== Casting ===
Akshay Kumar was cast as C. Sankaran Nair, a lawyer and statesman who was also a member of the Viceroy's Executive Council. Regina Cassandra was cast opposite Kumar, marking their first project. Ananya Panday and R. Madhavan was also cast for important roles.

=== Filming ===
The film's shooting began in November 2022 with Akshay Kumar, with Madhavan joining in January 2023, and later moved to mid-2023 in Mumbai where a large set of Jallianwala Bagh was constructed. Later, some important sequences which included Kumar and Panday were shot in IIT Roorkee. The next schedule was held in Alibag. Some portion of the film was also shot in Rewari Junction railway station and Rewari Railway Heritage Museum and in parts of Delhi including Red Fort, Sunder Nursery and Delhi University north campus area. The shooting was wrapped up by September 2024.

== Soundtrack ==
Kesari Chapter 2

Soundtrack album by Shashwat Sachdev
- Released: 18 April 2025
- Recorded: 2024–2025
- Studios: YRF Studios, Mumbai; Sonic Atelier; Kuhn Labs, Mumbai
- Genre: Feature film soundtrack
- Length: 29:33
- Language: Hindi
- Label: Zee Music Company

Shashwat Sachdev chronology
Ulajh (2024)	Kesari Chapter 2 (2025)	Dhurandhar (2025)
External audio
- Kesari Chapter 2 – Full Album on YouTube

Singles from Dhurandhar
- 1. "O Shera – Teer Te Taj (Film Version)" Released: 12 April 2025; 2. "Kithe Gaya Tu Saaiyaan" Released: 14 April 2025

The film's score and soundtrack are composed by Shashwat Sachdev, while one song is composed by Kavita Seth–Kanishk Seth, with the lyrics written by Irshad Kamil. The first single titled "O Shera – Teer Te Taj (Film Version)", composed by Sangtar, was released on 12 April 2025. The song was recreated from a 2020 song "Teer Te Taj" which was released during the 2020–2021 Indian farmers' protest. The second single titled "Kithe Gaya Tu Saaiyaan" was released on 14 April 2025. The full album of film was released on 14 April 2025.

Track listing
No.	Title	Singer(s)	Length
1.	"O Shera – Teer Te Taj (Film Version)" (Lyrics by Sukhwinder Amrit)	Manmohan Waris, Kamal Heer, Sangtar	2:32
2.	"Kithe Gaya Tu Saaiyaan"	Shashwat Sachdev, Shanya Kashyap	3:16
3.	"Parwardigara"	Ajoy Chakrabarty, Jubin Nautiyal, Garvit Soni	3:15
4.	"Cyclone" (Lyrics by King)	King	2:46
5.	"Main Hi Ishq Hoon"	Sanjith Hegde	3:47
6.	"Parwardigara" (Sufi Version)	Ajoy Chakrabarty, Jubin Nautiyal, Garvit Soni	5:33
7.	"Khumaari" (Music by Kavita Seth–Kanishk Seth)	Kavita Seth	3:08
8.	"Beetegi Raina"	Sonu Nigam, Sanjith Hegde	5:16
Total length:			29:33

== Marketing ==
The teaser was released on 24 March 2025, and the trailer was released on 3 April 2025. The trailer launch event was held on 3 April 2025 in Delhi.

== Release ==
=== Theatres ===
The film was first scheduled to be releasedon 14 March 2025, but was delayed until 18 April 2025. The Telugu dubbed version released 23 May 2025.

=== Home media ===
The digital streaming rights were acquired by JioHotstar. The film began streaming on the platform from 13 June 2025.

== Reception ==
On the review aggregator website Rotten Tomatoes, 35% of 17 critics' reviews are positive, with an average rating of 6.1/10. Bollywood Hungama rated the film 3.5/5 noting, "On the whole, KESARI CHAPTER 2 is a hard-hitting courtroom drama and works due to the performances and treatment and also because it tells an untold and shocking chapter of Indian history. At the box office, it will need a strong word of mouth to sustain and emerge as a profitable venture. The adults-only rating might restrict its business to some extent." Rishi Jogani in his review for Pinkvilla wrote, "Kesari Chapter 2 is a must-watch for its gripping courtroom drama, stellar performances, and unflinching portrayal of a dark chapter in history. While the film’s commercial aspects like the loud score often detract from the movie's groundedness, its powerful second half, soulful music, and exceptional performances make it a compelling experience."

Vineeta Kumar of India Today rated the film 3.5/5 noting, "Kesari Chapter 2 doesn't entirely rely on a chest-thumping, bulldozed sense of patriotism to win the audience's hearts - there is that hard-to-forget use of the F-word in an open court, and an elaborate dialogue explaining Hindu-Muslim unity. It unapologetically adds a bit of creative swag, and lets you be a part of the drama." Lachmi Deb Roy of Firstpost rated the film 4/5 calling it "a powerful and immensely engaging movie based on the Jallianwalla Bagh massacre and the fearless lawyer, Shankaran Nair (Akshay Kumar) who shook the foundation of the British Empire". Shubhra Gupta of The Indian Express rated the film 2.5/5 mentioning it as a film of its time, for its time, with dollops of patriotic fervour. Anuj Kumar of The Hindu was critical of the film writing, "It seems that after playing with ancient history, the big boys of Bollywood are meddling with modern history. While the dastardly act of the Empire needs to be exposed, the film, produced by Dharma Productions, milks the sacrifice of martyrs in Jallianwala Bagh to create a trumped-up narrative around the tragic episode. The disclaimer says it is a piece of fiction, but, as it turns out, it uses real incidents and characters to distort well-documented historical incidents that are easily available at the press of a button."

Writing for The Hindustan Times, Rishabh Suri rated the film 4/5, praising the writing and Akshay Kumar's performance. Uday Bhatia of Mint gave a negative review writing, "As with Dharma’s other recent historical, Ae Watan Mere Watan (2024), this is a case of Hindi filmmakers being unable to recognise surefire material when they see it, and burying it under piles of nonsense. Nair’s actual journey is fascinating, criticising Gandhi, returning his decorations by the British, fighting a very public case on their soil. But Kesari 2 is interested in Nair only to the extent that he provides a broad outline for Kumar to shout and weep and proclaim his love for India." Titas Chowdhury of News18 rated the film 3.5/5 writing, "Akshay Kumar sheds off his aura as a superstar and chooses to lean on his acting prowess, taking it a notch higher than Sarfira."

== Controversy ==
Poet and YouTuber Yahya Bootwala accused the makers of the film of plagiarizing his poem for a scene that Dilreet Gill's speech on the Jallianwala Bagh massacre allegedly lifted. in June 2025, an FIR case was filed by Ranajit Biswas against the makers for allegedly insulting the freedom history of Bengal.

== Sequel ==
A sequel, titled Kesari Chapter 3, was confirmed by Akshay Kumar and Deepak Rao Capour in April 2025, which would be based on the life of Hari Singh Nalwa, the first commander-in-chief of the Sikh Khalsa Fauj (the army of the Sikh Empire).

== See also ==
- O'Dwyer v. Nair Libel Case
