= The Case that Shook the Empire =

2019 book

- Author: Raghu Palat; Pushpa Palat
- Language: English
- Subject: O'Dwyer v. Nair Libel Case
- Genre: History
- Published: 2019
- Publisher: Bloomsbury Publishing
- Pages: 187
- ISBN: 978-93-89000-27-6

The Case that Shook the Empire is a book by Raghu and Pushpa Palat about the O'Dwyer v. Nair Libel Case held in London in English law against the Indian politician and lawyer Sir C. Sankaran Nair, by former Lieutenant Governor of the Punjab, Sir Michael O'Dwyer. It forms the basis of the Hindi film Kesari Chapter 2.

== Authors ==
The Case that Shook the Empire is written by Sir C. Sankaran Nair's great-grandson Raghu Palat and his wife Pushpa Palat.

== Content ==
The book comprises fourteen chapters, preceded by a foreword, preface, and prologue, and followed by a bibliography and acknowledgements, with no index included. Texts are generally referenced with footnotes on most pages.

The chapters are entitled:

- 1. An Indian in British India
- 2. The land of plenty
- 3. Masters of machination
- 4. Indians do not matter
- 5. The Jallianwala Massacre
- 6. Martial Law
- 7. Backlash
- 8. The trigger
- 9. The trial
- 10. The verdict
- 11. Reverberations
- 12. Grey skies
- 13. Thereafter
- 14. Afterward

=== Bibliography ===
The bibliography lists sources that include The Butcher of Amritsar by Nigel Collett, Mr Justice McCardie (1869-1933) by Antony Lentin, A Grammar of Politics by Harold Laski, The Life of General Dyer by Ian Colvin, the autobiography of Sir C. Sankaran Nair, India as I Knew It by Michael O'Dwyer, Sir Lepel Henry Griffin’s Ranjit Singh, works by Ian A. Talbot, Stanley Wolpert’s An Era of Judgment, and both the Hunter Report and Congress Report.
