= IFFI Best Debut Director Award =

Best directorial debut award in an Indian film festival

IFFI Best Debut Director and Best Indian Debut Director Awards
- International award for contributions to World Cinema and Indian Cinema
- Awarded for: Outstanding Debut Film of a Director
- Sponsored by: Directorate of Film Festivals
- Reward: Silver Peacock Award
- First award: 2016
- Final award: 2025
- Most recent winner: Hesam Farahmand; Tõnis Pill; Karan Singh Tyagi

Highlights
- Total awarded: 14
- First winner: Papa San Martin

The IFFI Award for Best Debut Director (officially known as the Silver Peacock for the Best Debut Film of a Director) is an honor that has been presented annually at the International Film Festival of India since the 47th IFFI 2016 for the best debut film direction in World cinema. The IFFI Award for Best Indian Debut Director was instituted from the 55th IFFI (2024) for the best debut film direction in Indian cinema.

== Recipients ==
=== IFFI Best Debut Director Award (since 2016) ===
List of Silver Peacock award recipients, showing the year, film(s), language(s) and Country
Year	Recipient(s)	Work(s)	Language(s)	Country	Ref.
2016 (47th)	Papa San Martin	Rara	Spanish	Spain	
2017 (48th)	Kiro Russo	Dark Skull	Spanish	Spain	
2018 (49th)	Treb Monteras II	Respeto	Filipino	Philippines	
2019 (50th)	Amin Sidi-Boumédiène Marius Olteanu	Abou Leila; Monsters.	French; Romanian	France; Romania	
2020 (51st)	Cassio Pereira dos Santos	Valentina	Portuguese	Brazil	
2021 (52nd)	Marí Alessandrini	Zahorí	Italian	Italy	
2022 (53rd)	Asimina Proedrou	Behind the Haystacks	Greek	Greece	
2023 (54th)	Rêger Azad Kaya	When The Seedlings Grow	Arabic	Turkey	
2024 (55th)	Sarah Friedland	Familiar Touch	English	USA	
2025 (56th)	Hesam Farahmand Tõnis Pill	My Daughter’s Hair; Fränk	Iran; Estonian	Iran; Estonia	

=== IFFI Best Indian Debut Director Award (since 2024) ===
List of Silver Peacock award recipients, showing the year, film(s) and language(s)
Year	Recipient(s)	Work(s)	Language(s)	Ref.
2024 (55th)	Navjyot Bandivadekar	Gharat Ganpati	Marathi	
2025 (56th)	Karan Singh Tyagi	Kesari Chapter 2	Hindi	
