= Douglas Carbery =

British army officer during WW1 and WW2

Douglas Hugh Moffatt Carbery
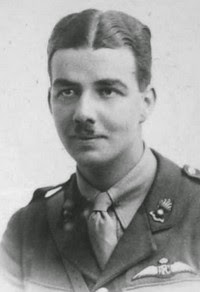
- Douglas Carbery
- Born: 26 March 1894; Ambala, Haryana, India
- Died: 27 April 1959 (aged 65); Lanner, Cornwall, England
- Military career
- Allegiance: United Kingdom
- Branch: British Army; Royal Air Force
- Service years: 1914–1946
- Rank: Brigadier
- Service number: 1525
- Units: Royal Regiment of Artillery; No. 9 Squadron RFC; No. 52 Squadron RFC; No. 59 Squadron RAF
- Commands: 14th (West Africa) Anti-Aircraft Brigade
- Conflicts: World War I; Third Anglo-Afghan War; Waziristan Campaign; Red Shirt and Afridi Rebellions; World War II
- Awards: Military Cross; Distinguished Flying Cross & Bar

Brigadier Douglas Hugh Moffatt Carbery MC, DFC* (26 March 1894 – 27 April 1959) was a British artillery officer, who became a World War I flying ace credited with six aerial victories while attached to the Royal Flying Corps and Royal Air Force. He later returned to the artillery, and commanded an anti-aircraft brigade during World War II.

== Biography ==
Carbery was the son of Hugh John Carbery of Cork, Ireland, and was born in Ambala, India. He was educated at King's School, Bruton, Somerset, before attending the Royal Military Academy, Woolwich, from where he was commissioned as a second lieutenant in the Royal Field Artillery on 12 August 1914.

=== World War I ===
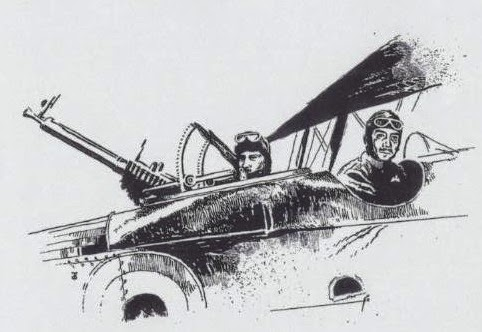
Douglas Carbery (1918)

Carbery served in France and Belgium with the British Expeditionary Force from 15 December 1914 to 17 May 1915, gaining promotion to lieutenant on 9 June, and returning to active duty between 16 July 1915 and 25 April 1916. He was wounded twice. He was then seconded to the Royal Flying Corps to train as a pilot, receiving the Royal Aero Club Aviator's Certificate No. 3383 at Hounslow on 31 July 1916, flying a B.E.2c biplane, and was appointed a flying officer by the RFC on 4 August.

He first served in No. 9 Squadron, a reconnaissance and artillery-spotting unit, and by early 1917 was serving in No. 52 Squadron. His first aerial victory came on 25 January, flying a R.E.8, driving a German aircraft down over Morlancourt, which was then captured. On 14 February, flying a B.E.2e, he shot down an Albatros D.III over St. Pierre.

On 26 March 1917 he was awarded the Military Cross. His citation read:

Lieutenant Douglas Hugh Moffatt Carbery, Royal Field Artillery and Royal Flying Corps.
For conspicuous gallantry and devotion to duty while engaged on artillery observation. He was attacked by four hostile machines, which he succeeded in driving off and continued to carry out his observations. Later, he was again attacked by several hostile machines and succeeded in bringing one of them down. He has previously done fine work.

On 26 August 1917 he was appointed a flight commander with the temporary rank of captain, and was promoted to captain on 3 November.

On 30 August 1918, Carbery, now serving with No. 59 Squadron RAF, and flying a R.E.8, shot down a Fokker D.VII over Beugnâtre. On 8 September he destroyed a Halberstadt C over Gonnelieu, and another on 24 September. Early on 28 September 1918 Carbery and his observer Lieutenant J. B. V. Clements were on patrol, and after shooting down a Halberstadt C near Vacquerie-le-Boucq, they saw a German gun crew near Bapaume with a limbered 77 mm (3 in) gun. A message dropped to British guns for an artillery strike brought no result, so Carbery attacked the German gun with four 25 lb (11 kg) bombs, then strafed the position, scattering the German troops, who abandoned the damaged gun near Achiet-le-Petit. The gun was subsequently captured and presented to Carbery as a war trophy. After the war he donated it to the RAF College at Cranwell, but kept one of the broken wheels, which later became the symbol of 59 Squadron.

On 3 December 1918 he was awarded the Distinguished Flying Cross. His citation read:

Captain Douglas Hugh Moffatt Carbery, MC. (Royal Field Artillery)
During recent operations this officer has displayed remarkable courage and skill in attacking hostile batteries, troops, etc., rendering valuable service in silencing the former and causing heavy casualties to the latter. In the air he is a bold and intrepid fighter. On 30 August he and his observer, attacked by seven Fokker biplanes, drove them off, shooting down one out of control.

At the end of the war Carbery was awarded the 1914–15 Star, the British War Medal, and the Victory Medal.

=== Inter-war career ===
In April 1919, following rioting in Gujranwala, Punjab, Carberry flew the first of 3 RAF planes that dropped bombs on and strafed civilians in that city. The riots had broken out amidst a protest against a massacre in Amritsar the previous day that had killed more than 300. He dropped 8 bombs, including one in the courtyard of a high school, before commencing strafing runs with two other planes.

On 1 August 1919 Carbery was granted a permanent commission as a flight lieutenant in the Royal Air Force. In July 1920 he was awarded a bar to his Distinguished Flying Cross for his services in the Third Anglo-Afghan War, and was also awarded the India General Service Medal with the clasp "Waziristan 1919–1921" for his services during the Waziristan campaign. On 20 December 1920, his transfer to the RAF was cancelled. On 1 January 1921 Carbery relinquished his temporary commission in the RAF, and was restored to the establishment of the Royal Regiment of Artillery the following day.

On 26 October 1927 he was appointed adjutant, serving in that post until 8 November 1929. He received a second clasp, "N.W. Frontier of India 1930–31", to his India General Service Medal for services during the Red Shirt and Afridi Rebellions, on the Indian North-West Frontier. He was promoted to major on 29 July 1933.

=== World War II ===
Carbery spent the first part of the war serving in the Royal Artillery's Coast Defence and Anti-Aircraft Branch. On 19 April 1940 he was appointed temporary lieutenant-colonel, and was confirmed in that rank on 1 February 1941. On 1 July 1942 he was appointed acting-colonel and acting-brigadier, to serve as commanding officer, 14th (West Africa) Anti-Aircraft Brigade, until 11 April 1943, seeing action in India and Burma. He was appointed a temporary brigadier on 1 January 1943, and was promoted to the rank of colonel on 1 February 1944. On 2 July 1946 Carbery retired and was granted the honorary rank of brigadier.

Brigadier Carbery died at Lanner, Cornwall, on 27 April 1959.

== Personal life ==
On 12 May 1932 Carbery married Violet Cecily Austin, the daughter of Sir William Michael Byron Austin, Bt. and Violet Irene Fraser. They had one child, Anne Irene Carbery, born in July 1935, who married Lieutenant-Commander Alexander Leonard Dominic Brown, RN, on 10 November 1956.
