= Cheikh Saïd =

Port in Yemen briefly occupied by French merchants in 1868

Coordinates: 12°44′04″N 43°30′19″E

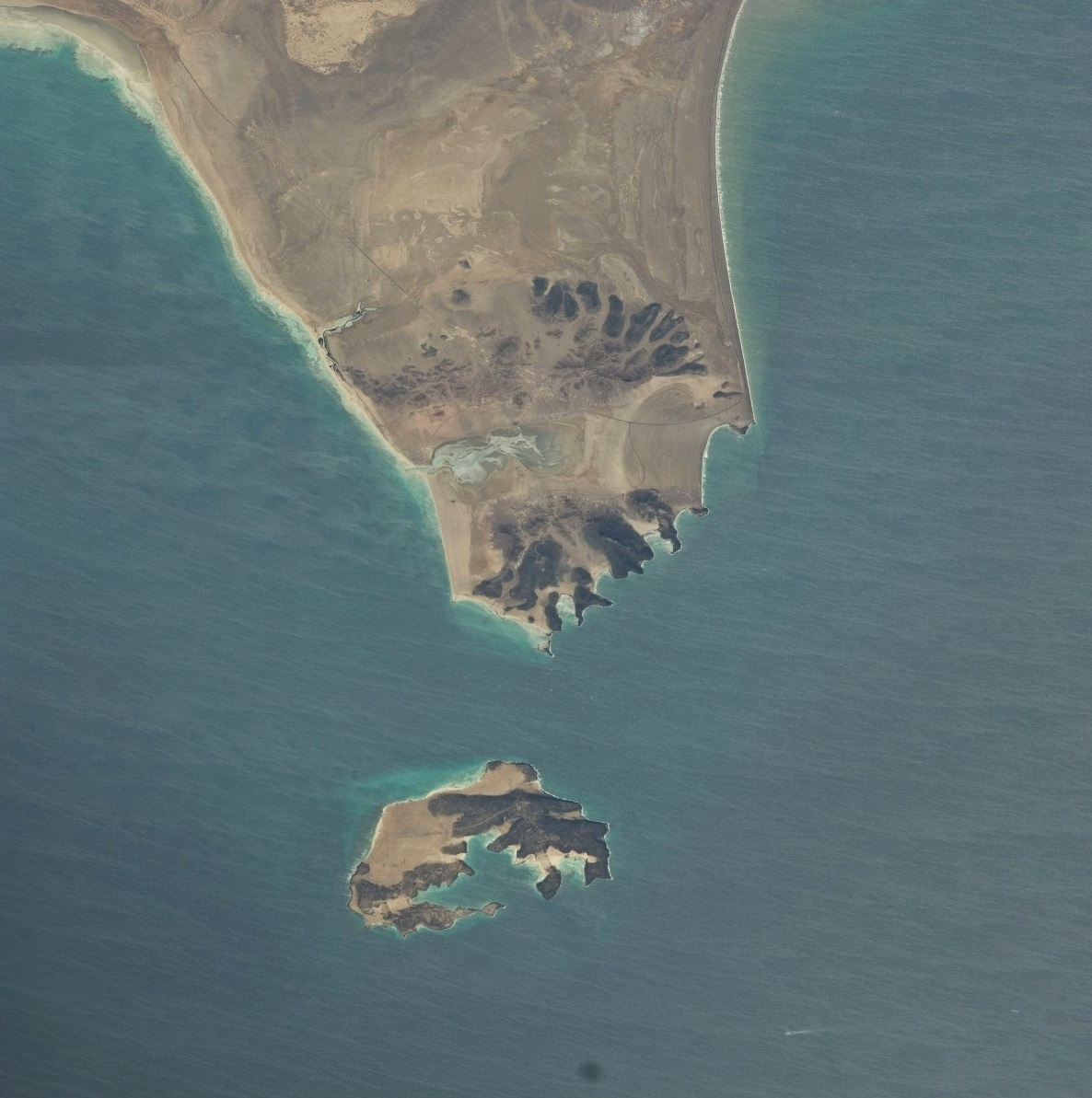
Perim Island and the Cheikh Saïd Peninsula

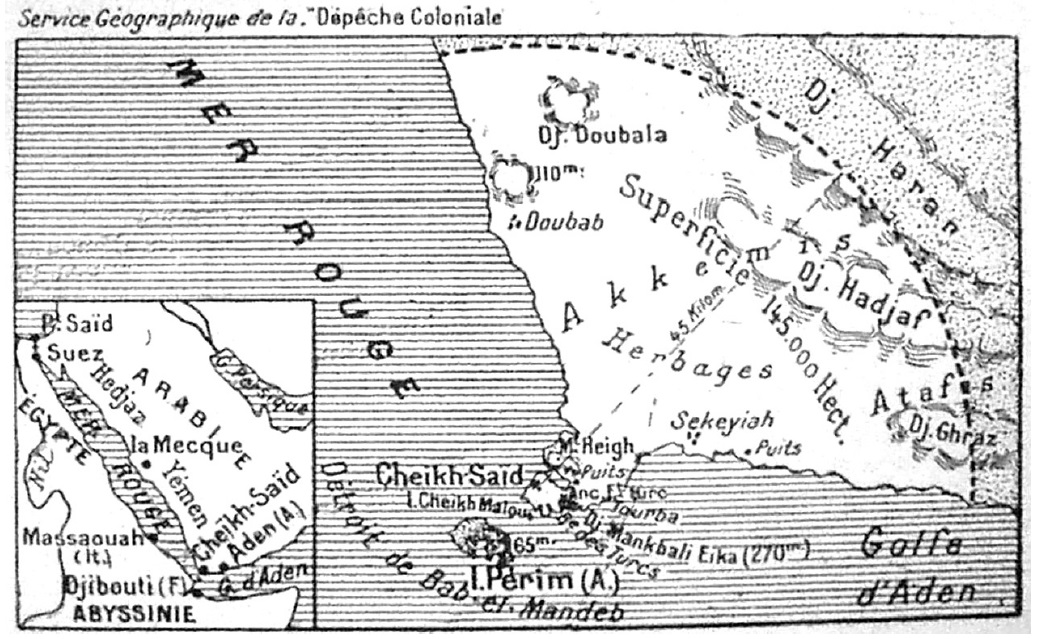
Map of the Territory of Cheik-Said (Cheikh Said, Sheikh Said) drawn by the geographical service of the French periodical La dépêche coloniale (23 May 1919 issue).

Cheikh Saïd (frequently spelled Sheikh Said; Arabic: شيخ سعيد) is a rocky peninsula in Yemen, near the island of Perim on the Bab-el-Mandeb at the entrance to the Red Sea.

== History ==
In 1868, it was purchased from the local ruler, Sheikh Ali Tabet Ahmed, by Bazin et Rabaud, a private company based in Marseille in France, which wanted to use it as a base for exporting coffee. The purchase price was 80,000 thalers. In 1869, the sheikh annulled the agreement as he had received only 18,000 thalers. Bazin et Rabaud and some allies in the French press attempted to press the French government to intervene, without success.

In the days before World War I, the Ottoman Empire maintained a small fort here guarding the entrance to the Red Sea. When the United Kingdom went to war with the Ottoman Empire in 1914, a landing was made from the armoured cruiser HMS Duke of Edinburgh which captured the fort and blew it up.

In 1920, Cheikh Saïd was described as a "good landing-place, with an important telegraph station."

=== The hoax ===
Cheikh Saïd was shown as a colony of France on the German map from 1923 and the French map from 1931. As late as 1973, the Petit Larousse described it as having been a "French territory in Southwest Arabia, opposite of Perim, taken by Yemen in 1936." Despite this, France never claimed formal jurisdiction or sovereignty over it and it officially affirmed it as a Yemeni territory in a 1936 treaty.

== See also ==
- French colonial empire
- List of French possessions and colonies
