= Sukhwinder Amrit =

Punjabi poet

Sukhvinder Amrit
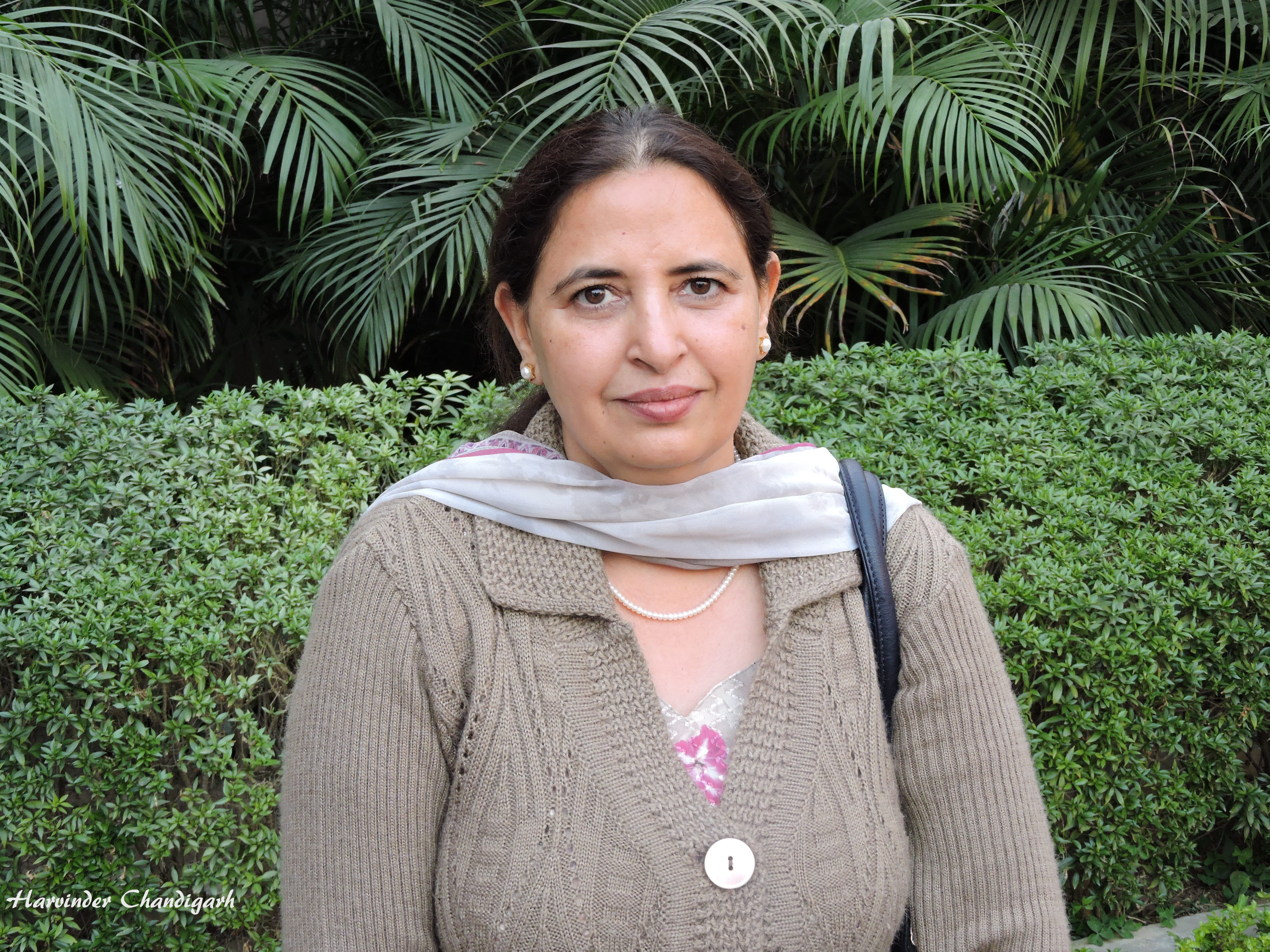
- Born: Sukhvinder Amrit; 1963 (age 62–63); Sadar Pura, District Ludhiana, Punjab, India
- Occupation: Poet
- Writing career
- Years active: 1997–present

Sukhwinder Amrit (born 1963) is a Punjabi poet. She is the 2008 recipient of Shromani Punjabi Kavi Purskar, presented by Punjab Language department, Government of Punjab.

== Life ==
Sukhwinder was born in Sadar Pura, in Jagraon tehsil, Punjab. She had one brother and was the eldest among her four sisters. She started writing poetry in her childhood though she had a terrible childhood. One day, her mother came across her notebook where she wrote poems. The end result was her notebook was burnt and she was beaten badly. She was married at the age of seventeen when she was in class nine. Life did not change much after her marriage, but due to her strong conviction and determination to learn and continue writing poems, she won the heart of her husband, Amarjit, and started her education. She started her schooling from 10th class when her children were also studying in the same school. She subsequently completed a M.A. degree in Punjabi literature. She served as a lecturer at Govt college, Ludhiana for one year.

== Publications ==
- Suraj di Dehleez (1997)
- Chiraghan di Daar(1999)
- Kanian (2000)
- Patjhar/Patjhad vich Pungarde Patte(2002)
- Kesar De Chhitte (edited 2003)
- Dhupp Di Chunni -(2006)
- Hzaar Rangan Di Laat(2008)
- Puniyaan (gazals)(2011)
- Neeleya Mora Ve (2012)
- Chirriyan (2014)

== Awards and honours ==
- Shiromani Punjabi Kavi Puruskar 2008

By Bhasha Vibhag, Punjab

- Gurmukh Singh Musafir Puruskar 2007

By Bhasha Vibhag, Punjab

- Kartar Singh Dhaliwal Puruskar 2007

By Punjabi Sahit Akadmi, Ludhiana .

- Bawa Balwant Purskar 1999

By Punjabi Sahit Trust Dhuddike

- Matru Pitru Puruskar 2002

By Gadgil Sisters Mahrashtra

- Amrita Pritam Puruskar 2006

By Prof. Mohan Singh Foundation, Ludhiana .

== Other achievements ==
- Represented Punjabi Poetry in the Saravbhasha Kavi Sammelan organized by All India Radio 2007
- Represented Punjabi Poetry in the Saarc Festival of Literature at Agra . 2013
- Participated in Canada as poet in Women Conference organized by Kwantlen University, Surrey .
- Participated as a poet in the World Punjabi Conference, Lahore (Pakistan )2001
- Participated as poet in various programmes organised in Britain, U.S.A. Australia and New Zealand.
- Participated in many Poetry Symposia organized by Bhartiya Sahitya Akademi, Punjabi Akademi, Doordarshan, Akashvani, and Punjab Arts Council in the different states of India .
