= Aerial bombing of Gujranwala (1919) =

| Date | April 1919 |
| Location | Gujranwalla, British India |

On 14 April 1919, the day after the Jallianwala Bagh Massacre in Amritsar, three Royal Air Force aircraft, piloted by Douglas Carbery, Oddie, and Second-Lieutenant Vincent, equipped with bombs and machine guns, flew from Lahore to Gujranwala, Punjab. (Note: According to the official British report (Hunter Report), a fourth aircraft also flew out though did not fire or bomb.) In total, during the 40 minute operation, Carbery reported firing 200 rounds and dropping eight bombs, four of which failed to detonate. Bombing and firing was aimed at people in a farm, on a village road, in a school courtyard and boarding house, and in the town itself. He acknowledged making no distinction between agitators and bystanders and said he often kept firing into crowds as they ran for cover, intending "to do more damage". (Note: British officials in London and Delhi agreed that all British personnel should receive amnesty for their actions in Punjab. However, the Colonial Office rejected Viceroy Lord Chelmsford’s demand that any inquiry be narrowly limited to a few incidents such as the aerial bombing of Gujranwala, and coupled with guaranteed immunity, instead insisting on a broader investigation into official conduct.)

At a House of Commons sitting on 28 May 1919 Colonel Josiah Wedgwood asked Edwin Montagu, Secretary of State for India, whether aircraft had bombed rioters in India, who authorised it, and whether such attacks on civilians would be stopped. Montagu responded by calling the bombing effective to which Wedgwood replied "In view of the fact that these aeroplanes cannot drop bombs accurately, and that therefore in large towns bombs are about certain to hit the wrong people, would it not be more humane to employ the other efficient means of defence in our power?" When Wedgwood asked about the death toll, Montagu said he had no information.
