= Pearay Mohan =

Indian lawyer and author

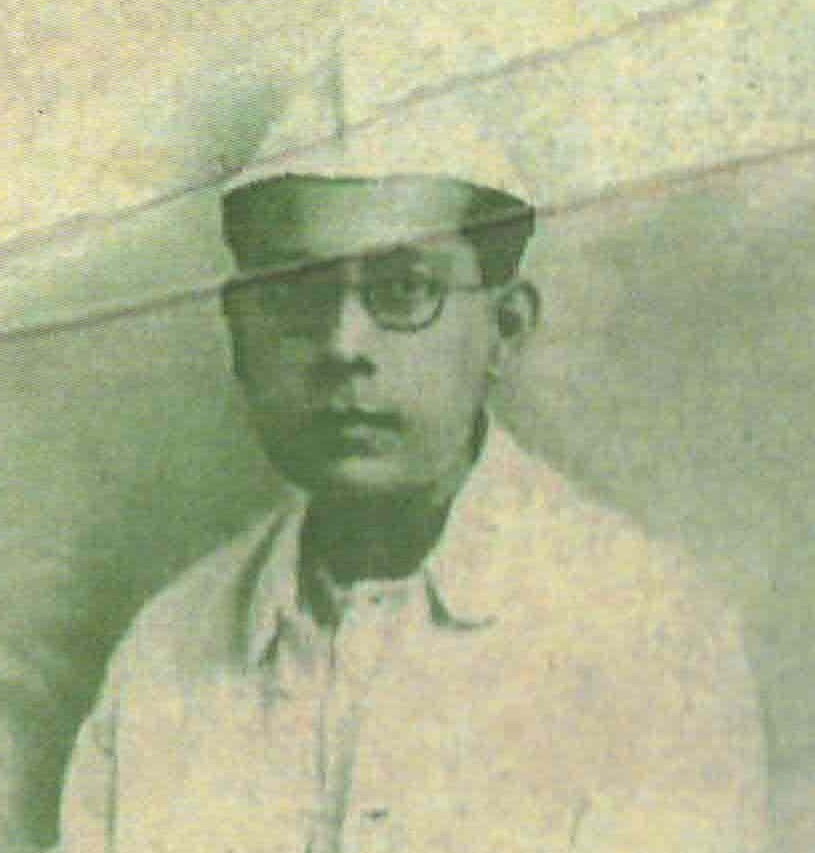
- Pearay Mohan (family album)
- Born: Pearay Mohan Dattatreya; 1895; Lahore
- Died: 23 December 1936 (aged 40–41)
- Occupations: Lawyer, Lahore High Court; Writer; Politician
- Years active: 1914-1936
- Notable work: Fasānah-i-Jung-i-Yurap (1914); An Imaginary Rebellion and How It was Suppressed (1920)

Pearay Mohan Dattatreya (1895 - 23 December 1936) was an Indian lawyer, senior assistant editor of The Tribune, and author of An Imaginary Rebellion and How It was Suppressed (1920), published shortly after the release of the Indian Congress report on the Punjab disturbances of 1919, and in which included a foreword by Lala Lajpat Rai.

== Biography ==
Pearay Mohan was born in 1895 in Lahore, to Brij Mohan Dattatreya Kaifi, an Urdu and Persian scholar and poet. In 1914 he co-authored with the journalist, Bishan Sahai Azad, a text in Urdu on the story of the war in Europe, titled Fasānah-i-Jung-i-Yurap. In 1915 he graduated from Government College, Lahore, having received the top prize in economics and philosophy. He gained a law degree in 1917 and began practicing in Lahore, before being called to the Bar.

In December 1919 Mohan wrote an account of martial law in Punjab, titled An Imaginary Rebellion and How It was Suppressed, published in 1920 shortly after the release of the Indian Congress report on the Punjab disturbances of 1919, and in which included a foreword by Lala Lajpat Rai. In it, he criticised the British Raj for fabricating enemies and situations for the purpose of expanding harsh laws such as the Rowlatt Act. Such laws, he noted, may be used to cause "widespead injustice and terror...when the local government is in a state of panic or excitement". He also believed that the approver Hans Raj worked with the British to gather crowds at Jallianwalla Bagh shortly prior to the massacre there. Upon its release it was banned and copies confiscated by the British government in India. In November 1920 he joined The Tribune, for which he became senior assistant editor, working with Kali Nath Roy.

Mohan brought several cases to court, including some against the Railway for reserving special seats for Anglo-Indians on trains. In 1930 he successfully filed a suit against the Secretary of State for India, for his own wrongful search and detention by the senior superintendent of police of Lahore, James Scott, when the Simon Commission arrived in Lahore on 30 October 1928. He later became senior vice-president of the Punjab Journalists’ Association, and was planning to contribute further in politics.

Mohan died on 13 December 1936, at the age of 41 years.

== Selected publications ==
- An Imaginary Rebellion And How It Was Suppressed (1920). Lahore: Khosla Brothers. 1920. (Note: Original from 1920, whereas the reprint of 1999 was printed in two volumes for being lengthy.)
