= Sclerotomy =

Incision into the white area of the eye

Sclerotomy is a medical intervention that involves surgical cutting in the white area of the eye, known as the sclera. The goal of this intervention is usually done to correct defects in sclera that resulted as a complication of glaucoma of other ocular diseases. Sclerotomy can be divided into anterior sclerotomy and posterior sclerotomy. The sclerotomy incisions are made by:

1. Transconjunctival sutureless vitrectomy (TSV)
2. High-frequency deep sclerotomy (HFDS)
3. Full-thickness sclerotomy
