= Thomas Peter Ellis =

Welsh judge (1873–1936)

Thomas Peter Ellis (4 June 1873 - 1936) was a Welsh judge in the Indian Civil Service.

== Early life and education ==
Thomas Ellis was born in Wrexham, Wales, on 4 June 1873, to Peter Ellis and Mary. Following his father's premature death, he spent his childhood with his mother on a farm near Glyndyfrdwy. He completed his early education from Oswestry high school and then gained admission to Lincoln College, Oxford.

== Death ==
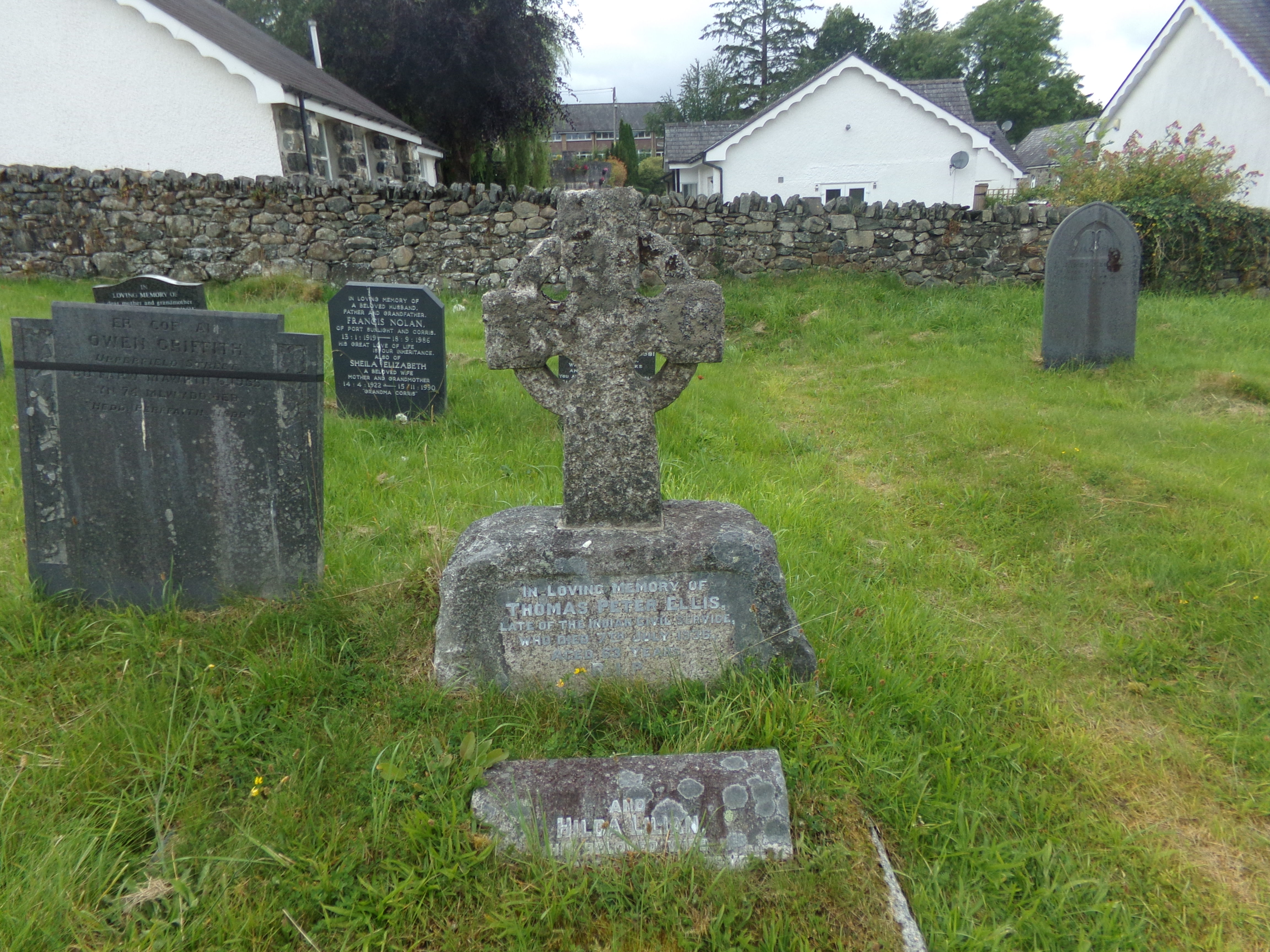
Grave of Thomas Peter Ellis 1873 - 1936

Ellis died in 1936.

== Selected publications ==
- Law of Pre-emption in the Punjab. Law Book Company. 1945.
- Notes on Punjab custom. Lahore: Civil and Military Gazette Press. 1921.
- Digest of Civil Law for the Punjab (1921), revision of Rattington, W. H. (1901). Digest of civil law for the Punjab, Customary law as at present judiciary ascertained. Civil and Military Gazettee, Lahore.
- Welsh Tribal Law and Custom in the Middle Ages by T.P. Ellis. At the Clarendon Press. 1926.
