= Invasion of Cheikh Said =

Offensive during World War I

- Part of the South Arabia during World War I
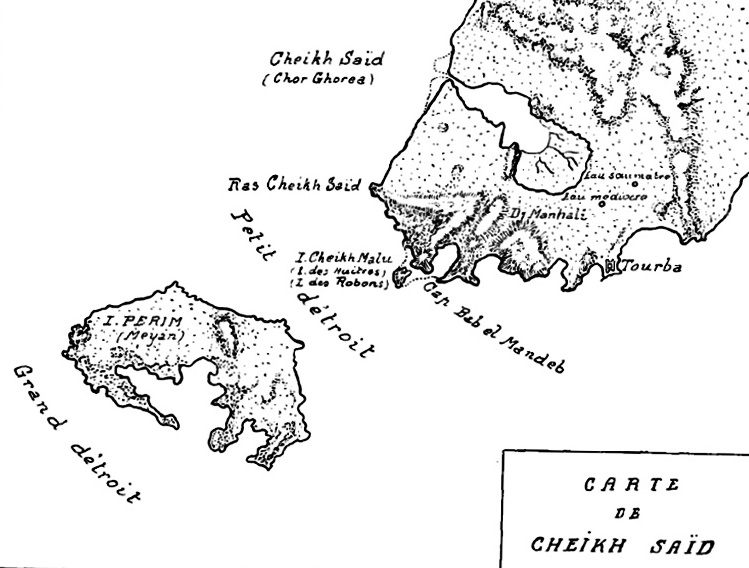
- Map of Cheikh Said.
| Date | 10 November 1914 – 11 November 1914 |
| Location | Cheikh Said |
| Result | British victory. Ottoman fort of Cheikh Said blown up and start of the Aden Theatre. |

Belligerents
| Ottoman Empire | British Empire; British Raj |

Commanders and leaders
| Unknown | (United Kingdom of Great Britain and Ireland) H. V. Cox |

Strength
| An Ottoman garrison | Consists of 29th Indian Brigade and 23rd Sikhs Pioneers; HMS Duke of Edinburgh |

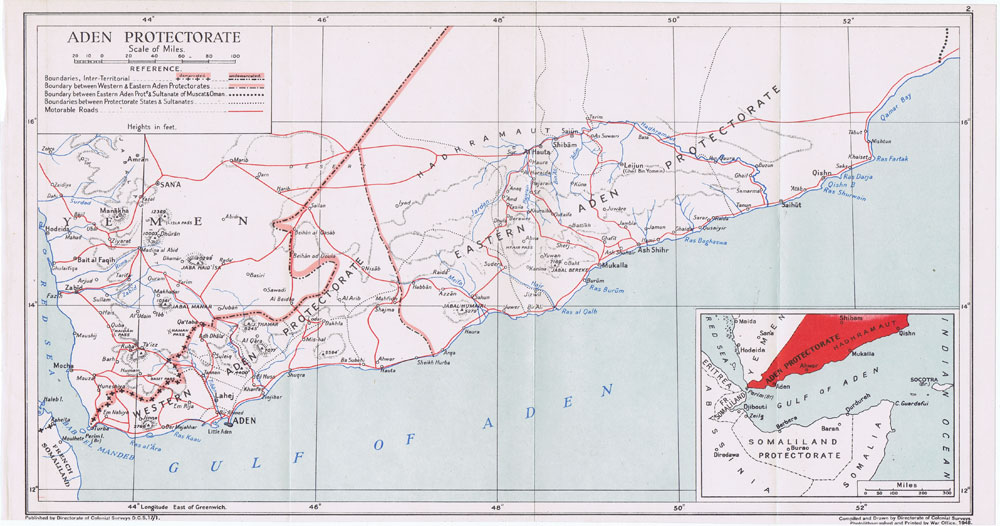
Map of Aden Protectorate

The invasion of Cheikh Said was a part of the campaigns by the Ottomans to take Aden, a British crown colony. It was a British offensive led by H. V. Cox to destroy Ottoman works, wells, and armaments they had there on the 10th of November 1914. It resulted in Ottoman retreat and total British victory by the next day.

== Background ==
Britain declared war on the Ottoman Empire on 5 November 1914. In response, the Ottomans themselves declared war back on the British six days later. From the start of the war, the Ottomans had planned, along with the Arab tribes, to take over the British crown colony of Aden and its hinterland, the Aden Protectorate. The Ottomans, to execute the plan, maintained a small fort guarding the entrance of the Red Sea in Cheikh Saïd, a peninsula which juts out into the Red Sea towards the island of Perim. Meanwhile, Britain ordered the 29th Indian Brigade, under Brigadier-General H. V. Cox, CB, then on its way from India to Suez, to interrupt its voyage to capture Cheikh Saïd and destroy the Ottoman forces gathered there.

== Battle ==
On the 10th of November, the British sent transports conveying three battalions of the 29th Indian Brigade and 23rd Sikh Pioneers to land an offensive on the Ottoman garrison present in the Peninsula. Accompanied by the armored cruiser HMS Duke of Edinburgh, they opened fire on the Ottoman garrison while the transports were seeking a place to land.

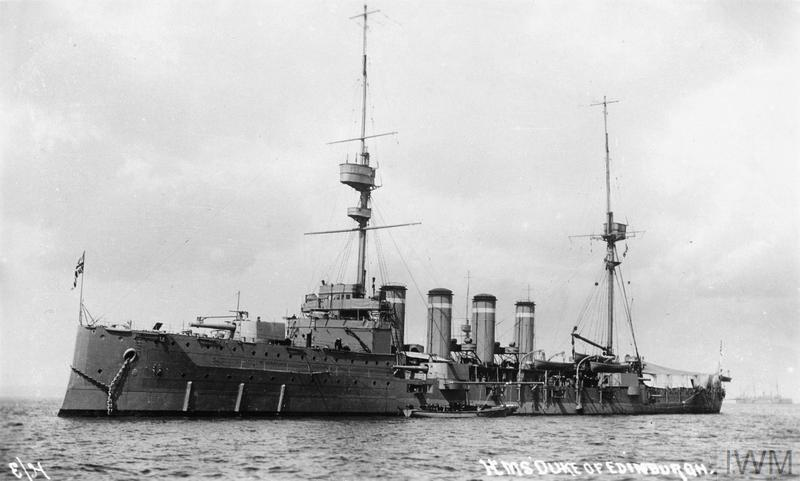
Armoured cruiser HMS Duke of Edinburgh

The location planned earlier, though, was impossible for troops to land on account of the weather, and the troops landed somewhere else a little way off under the armored cruiser's cover fire. The 29th Indian Brigade and 23rd Sikh Pioneers, along with the sailors who had joined in the landing, stormed the Ottomans' position and forced the Turks to leave their field guns behind and retreat. The next day, with the help of a naval demolition party, the Ottomans' fortifications were lost to the British forces. After its capture, the Ottomans' fort there was blown up by the British.

== After the landing ==
What followed was that H. V. Cox continued his way to Suez, as it was unfavourable to continue the offensive inland. The Ottomans in turn had troops stationed at the north of the Aden Protectorate's border. As of its impact, it kick-started the Aden Theatre. In July 1915, the peninsula was retaken by Ottoman forces until their surrender on 19 January 1919.
