= Bertrand Bosworth-Smith =

English cricketer

Personal information
- Full name: Bertrand Nigel Bosworth-Smith
- Born: 20 June 1873; Harrow, Middlesex, England
- Died: 19 February 1947 (aged 73); Hove, Sussex, England
- Batting: Right-handed
- Bowling: Slow left-arm orthodox
- Relatives: Archie Wickham (uncle)

Domestic team information
- Years: Team
- 1909: Dorset
- 1900/01: Europeans
- 1897–1901: Marylebone Cricket Club
- 1895: Middlesex
- 1895–1896: Oxford University

Career statistics
Competition	First-class
Matches	11
Runs scored	323
Batting average	17.00
100s/50s	–/–
Top score	45
Balls bowled	60
Wickets	–
Bowling average	–
5 wickets in innings	–
10 wickets in match	–
Best bowling	–
Catches/stumpings	6/–
- Source: ESPNcricinfo, 22 January 2017

Bertrand Nigel Bosworth-Smith CSI (20 June 1873 – 19 February 1947) was a British administrator in India and English cricketer.

Born at Harrow, Bosworth-Smith was educated at Harrow School, before attending Magdalen College, Oxford. While attending Oxford, Bosworth-Smith made his debut in first-class cricket for Oxford University in 1895, playing once for the university that year against the Marylebone Cricket Club (MCC). He also made what would be his only first-class appearance for Middlesex in 1895, playing against Nottinghamshire in the County Championship. He played twice more for Oxford University in 1896, graduating in 1897 a Bachelor of Arts (B.A.). He played in two first-class matches for the Marylebone Cricket Club in 1897 against county opposition, with both matches played at Lord's.

He was appointed to the Indian Civil Service, which saw his appointment as an Assistant Commissioner in the Punjab. He played two first-class matches while in India for the Europeans cricket team in the Bombay Presidency against the Parsees in August and September 1900. Bosworth-Smith had returned home to England by 1901, where he made two further first-class appearances for the MCC at Lord's. Returning to India, his final appearance in first-class cricket came for the Gentlemen of India against a touring Oxford University Authentics team in 1903. He would later play for Dorset in a Minor Counties Championship match in 1909.

He was married to Mary Constance Bett in June 1912, later divorcing. He was a Companion to the Order of the Star of India for his service in the Indian Civil Service. He died at Hove, Sussex on 19 February 1947. His uncle, Archie Wickham, was also a first-class cricketer.
