= Henry St. George Murray McRae =

- Born: 10 November 1878; Lahore, British India
- Died: 28 December 1962 (aged 84); England
- Military career
- Allegiance: United Kingdom
- Branch: Indian Army
- Rank: Lieutenant-colonel
- Conflicts: First World War
- Awards: Distinguished Service Order (1916)

Lieutenant-colonel Henry St. George Murray McRae (10 November 1878 - 28 December 1962) was a British Indian Army officer with the 45th Rattray's Sikhs and officer in charge of martial law in Kasur in 1919.

== Early life and career ==
Henry McRae was born in Meean Meer, Lahore, on 10 November 1878. He began his military career in 1898 as a Second Lieutenant in the 3rd Battalion of the Royal Irish Regiment, later transferring to the Indian Army as a Lieutenant in the 1st Battalion of the 15th Punjab Regiment. In 1901, he joined the 14th Sikhs, and by 1915, he was serving with the 45th Rattray's Sikhs.

In April 1919, during the Punjab disturbances, McRae was put in charge of martial law in Kasur.

== Honours and awards ==
In 1916 McRae received the Distinguished Service Order. The following year he was mentioned in dispatches.

== Death ==
McRae died in England on 28 December 1962.

== Selected publications ==
- Regimental History of the 45th Rattray's Sikhs. Glasgow. 1933.

== See also ==
- 45th Battalion (Australia)
