= India as I Knew It =

- Author: Michael O'Dwyer
- Language: English
- Published: 1925
- Publisher: Constable and Company

India as I Knew It is a memoir by Sir Michael O'Dwyer, a former Indian Civil Service (ICS) officer and Lieutenant Governor of Punjab, British India from 1913 to 1919 during the British Raj. Published in 1925 by Constable and Company, the book covers O'Dwyer's experiences of India from 1885 to 1925. It includes his personal account of the events surrounding the Jallianwala Bagh massacre in 1919. The volume was printed in England and features a preface, 21 chapters, two maps, and a dedication to his wife.
