= William Beynon (Indian Army officer) =

British Indian Army general

Sir William Beynon
- Born: 5 November 1866; Agra, India
- Died: 9 February 1955 (aged 88); Gerrards Cross in south Buckinghamshire, UK
- Military career
- Allegiance: United Kingdom
- Branch: Indian Army
- Rank: Major-General

Major-General Sir William George Lawrence Beynon, KCIE, CB, DSO (5 November 1866 – 9 February 1955) was a British Indian Army officer.

== Military career ==
British forces commanded by Major-General Beynon advanced into Mahsud tribal territory on the 6th. British forces engaged the Mahsud several days in June. On 25 June 1917, hostilities ceased when the Mahsud sued for peace. Part of the terms were that the Mahsuds had to hand rifles they had stolen, some of these came into the hands of British troops while they were still there. British troops began withdrawing on 12 July. The final peace agreement came on 10 August 1917 with a Mahsud jirga.

== Bibliography ==
Notes

References

- The National Archives (2021). "Beynon Collection: papers of and relating to Maj-Gen Sir Will- iam George Lawrence". The National Archives (United Kingdom).
- National Army Museum (2021). "The North-West Frontier". National Army Museum.
- Neiberg, Michael S. (2017). World War I. Routledge. ISBN 9781351142786. - Total pages: 628
- Parker, Harry (20 August 1917). "Waziristan Campaign 1917".
- Parker-Galbreath, Simon (1932). "Waziristan Campaign 1917".
