= Aubrey J. O'Brien =

British Indian army officer and writer

- Born: 5 December 1870
- Died: 31 August 1930 (aged 59)
- Military career
- Allegiance: United Kingdom
- Branch: Indian Army

Lieutenant-Colonel Aubrey John "A.J." O'Brien CIE CBE (5 December 1870 – 31 August 1930) was an officer in the British Indian Army and a writer on India.

== Earlylife and education ==
AubreyJohn O'Brien was born on 5 December 1870, to Edward O'Brien of the Bengal Civil Service,and his wife Mary Oclanis. He attended Clifton College's preparatory school, leaving there in April 1880. He was later educated at Dover College and at Sandhurst.

== Military career ==
O'Brien served three and a half years in the Loyal North Lancashire Regiment, and one and a half years in the 110th Maratha Light Infantry before spending 29 years in the Punjab as commissioner of Ambala, Lahore, and Jalandhar.

== Judicial career ==
O'Brien remained a district judge as a Lieutenant at Bannu (then part of British India, now in Pakistan). On 9 November 1901 he was promoted to the rank of captain and appointed as the 1st Deputy Commissioner of the newly formed Mianwali District (then part of British India, now in Pakistan). He served Mianwali not once but three times, the second time in 1906 and the third time in 1914. However he was promoted to the rank of major during his third tenure at Mianwali.

== Awards and honours ==
O'Brien was made CIE in 1906 and CBE in 1919.

== Death ==
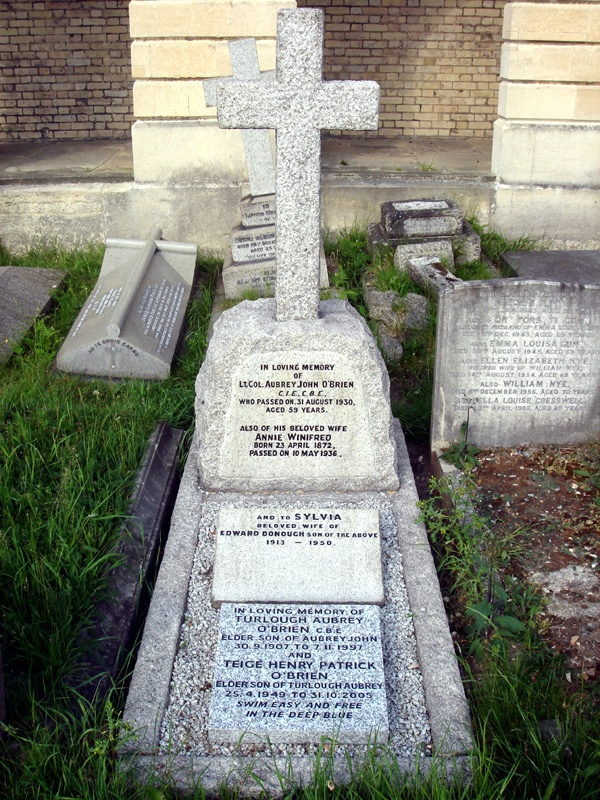
Funerary monument, Brompton Cemetery, London

O'Brien died on 31 August 1930 in Kensington, aged 59, from undisclosed causes. He was interred at Brompton Cemetery, London. Attendees at the funeral included his daughters, his two sons, Thurlow and Edward, Sir Louis Dane, A. J. W. Kitchin, Edward Douglas MacLagan, Sir John Maynard, and R. W. E. Knollys.

== Selected works ==
- Female infanticide in the Punjab, Folklore 19:3 (1908), pp. 261–75
- Mianwali Folklore Notes, Folklore 22:1 (1911), pp. 73–77
- "The Mohammedan Saints of the Western Punjab". The Journal of the Royal Anthropological Institute of Great Britain and Ireland. 41: 509–520. 1911. doi:10.2307/2843185. ISSN 0307-3114.
- Cupid and Cartridges. W. Blackwood. 1911. (with Reginald Bolster)
- Bahawalpur: Transformation of an Indian State, The Times, 4 November 1926
