= Michael O'Dwyer =

Irish colonial administrator (1864–1940)

Sir Michael O'Dwyer GCIE KCSI
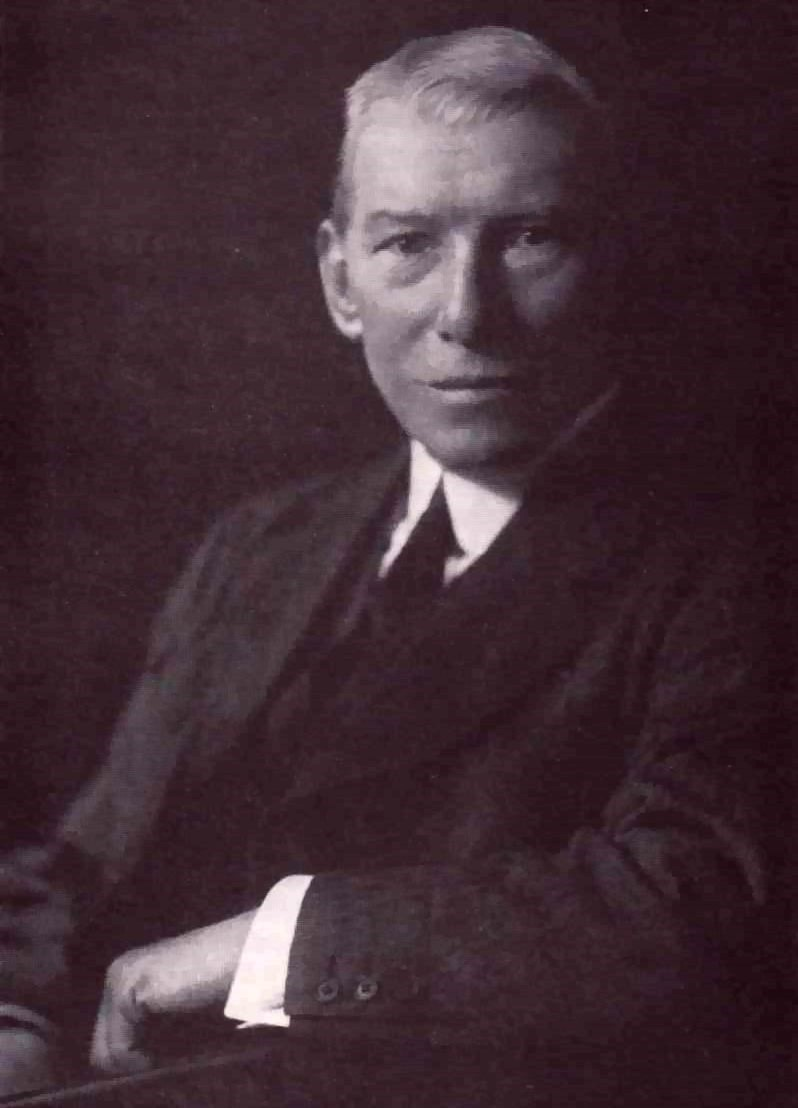

Lieutenant Governor of the Punjab
- In office 26 May 1913 – 26 May 1919

Personal details
- Born: 28 April 1864 Barronstown, County Tipperary, Ireland
- Died: 13 March 1940 (aged 75) Caxton Hall, Westminster, London, England
- Cause of death: Assassination by gunshot
- Resting place: Brookwood Cemetery
- Spouse: Una Eunice Bord
- Children: 2
- Education: Balliol College, Oxford
- Occupation: Colonial Administrator
- Known for: Defence of India Act 1915; Administering martial law in Punjab, British India (April–June 1919); Lieutenant Governor of the Punjab (1913–1919) during the Jallianwala Bagh massacre

Sir Michael Francis O'Dwyer GCIE KCSI (28 April 1864 – 13 March 1940) was an Irish colonial officer in the Indian Civil Service (ICS) who served as the Lieutenant Governor of the Punjab from 1913 to 1919. His tenure is most notably associated with the Jallianwala Bagh massacre, which took place in Amritsar on 13 April 1919.

O'Dwyer endorsed Reginald Dyer’s actions at Jallianwala Bagh and maintained that Dyer’s order to fire on the crowd was justified. As a result, his actions are considered among the most significant factors in the rise of the Indian independence movement.

He subsequently administered martial law in Punjab, on 15 April and backdated it to 30 March 1919. In 1925, he published India as I Knew It in which he wrote that his time as administrator in Punjab was preoccupied by the threat of Indian nationalism, demanding freedom and the spread of political agitation. In 1940, in retaliation for the massacre, O'Dwyer was assassinated by the Indian revolutionary Sardar Udham Singh.

== Early life and education ==
Michael Francis O'Dwyer was born on 28 April 1864 in Barronstown, Limerick Junction, County Tipperary, to John, a landowner of Barronstown, Solohead, and Margaret (née Quirke) O'Dwyer, of Toem, both in County Tipperary, Ireland. He was the sixth son in a family of fourteen children, At the age of seven, he was sent to be schooled at St Stanislaus College, Rahan, County Offaly.

Later, he attended Mr Wren's educational crammer school in Powis Square, London, and subsequently passed the open entrance competition for the Indian Civil Service in 1882. After completing two years of probation at Balliol College, Oxford, he passed the final examination in 1884 in fourth place overall. At the time, the ICS examination was highly competitive, with no more than 1200 ICS officers in office at one time, and he was likely influenced by the reputations of the likes of Lord Lawrence, one of the first British civil administrators in India. In his third year he obtained a first class in jurisprudence. Philip Woodruff wrote of O'Dwyer's upbringing:

Michael O'Dwyer was one of the fourteen children of an unknown Irish land-owner of no great wealth, as much farmer as landlord. He was brought up in a world of hunting and snipe-shooting, of threatening letters and houghed cattle, where you were for the Government or against it, where you passed every day the results of lawlessness in the blackened walls of empty houses. It was a world very different from the mild and ordered life of southern England... One gets the impression [of O'Dwyer when at Balliol] of a man who seldom opened a book without a purpose, whose keen hard brain acquired quickly and did not forget but had little time for subtleties.

The O'Dwyer family were Unionists. In 1882, his family home in Ireland was fired upon by Irish nationalists, and the following year, his father died after a second stroke. Of his siblings, two brothers served in India, and two others became Jesuit priests.

== Early career ==
In 1885, he travelled to India as an ICS officer and was first posted to Shahpur in Punjab. He distinguished himself in land revenue settlement work and in 1896 was made director of land records and agriculture in Punjab. Subsequently, he was placed in charge of the settlements of Alwar and Bharatpur states.

After a year and a half of travels around Europe and Russia, he was selected by Lord Curzon for a significant role in the organisation of the new North-West Frontier Province and its separation from Punjab. From 1901 to 1908, he was revenue commissioner; from 1908 to 1909, he was acting resident in Hyderabad; and from 1910 to 1912, he was agent to the governor-general in Central India.

In December 1912, during Lord Hardinge of Penshurst's tenure as Viceroy, O'Dwyer was appointed Lieutenant Governor of Punjab. When he assumed charge in May 1913, he was appointed a Knight Commander of the Order of the Star of India and was cautioned by the Viceroy Hardinge that "the Punjab was the Province about which the Government were then the most concerned; that there was much inflammable material lying about; which required very careful handling if an explosion was to be avoided".

=== First World War recruitment ===
O'Dwyer worked closely with the military authorities and sought the aid of local rural Punjabi leaders to organise a centralised system for the recruitment of soldiers for the First World War effort in exchange for compensation, including major land grants and formal titles. As a result, most of the recruits were drawn from rural areas of the Punjab, which ultimately left a number of families without their breadwinners. Those who returned from the war aspired to a reward and a better life. The co-operation between the civil and military leaders and the leading rural Punjabis, as later described by the historian Tan Tai Yong, laid "the foundations of a militarized bureaucracy in colonial Punjab".

Of the Indian recruits for the War from the whole of India, the 360,000 from the Punjab formed more than half. In 1917, O'Dwyer's efforts in recruiting Punjabi men for the war effort earned him appointment as a Knight Grand Cross of the Order of the Indian Empire, when India's Viceroy was Lord Chelmsford. However, during the war, there was also a growing home rule movement.

=== Defence of India Act 1915 ===
He played a significant role in persuading the British government in India to pass the 1915 Defence of India Act, which gave him considerable powers. Passed on 18 March 1915, the Act allowed special tribunals for revolutionary crimes to take place without possibilities for appeal. He opposed the Montagu–Chelmsford Reforms for fear that his efforts in recruitment through the rural leaders would be destroyed by increasing powers to “urban elites”.

=== Surveillance in 1919 ===
From mid-March 1919, under O’Dwyer's orders, the CID in Amritsar kept a close surveillance of two Gandhian non-violent Indian nationalists; the Muslim barrister Saifuddin Kitchlew and the Hindu physician Dr. Satyapal. O'Dwyer subsequently summoned both to Deputy Commissioner Miles Irving's house in the Civil Lines on 10 April 1919 from where they were arrested and secretly escorted to Dharamasala, at the foot of the Himalayas, to be kept under house arrest. As the news of the arrest became widespread, supporters began to gather near Irving's home, and what initially began as a peaceful attempt to make enquiries ended up in a violent clash. On 13 April 1919, a meeting was called to take place at Jallianwala Bagh to protest the arrest.

== Amritsar massacre ==
It was during O'Dwyer's tenure as Lieutenant Governor of Punjab that the Jallianwala Bagh massacre occurred in Amritsar on 13 April 1919, three days after the onset of the riots. A detachment of 50 British Indian Army soldiers under the command of Brigadier-General Reginald Dyer fired on a crowd in Amritsar, killing more than 3,000 people. According to then civil surgeon Dr Smit 1,526 people had been killed. O'Dwyer was informed of the event at 3 am the following day. When he received Dyer's initial report, O'Dwyer gave permission to General William Beynon to send a telegram to Dyer that stated "your action correct and the lieutenant-governor approves".

O'Dwyer and several other senior colonial officials supported Dyer's actions both initially, when only limited information had been received, and later, when more detailed information of the scale of the killings became available. Subsequently, martial law was imposed on 15 April and backdated to 30 March. As a result, his actions are considered one of the most significant factors in the rise of the Indian independence movement, led by Mahatma Gandhi. On 21 April 1919 in Dyer's defence, O'Dwyer stated to Viceroy Chelmsford that "the Amritsar business cleared the air, and if there was to be holocaust anywhere, and one regrets that there should be, it was best at Amritsar".

One theory surrounding the massacre, as described by Pearay Mohan and historian Raja Ram, is one of a "premeditated plan" conspired by O'Dwyer and others, including a young Punjabi youth Hans Raj. Other historians including Nick Lloyd, K. L. Tuteja, Anita Anand and Kim A. Wagner have found that theory to lack evidence and that there was no conspiracy that Hans Raj was an "agent provocateur".

O'Dwyer had contended without evidence that Dyer's violent suppression of the civilian demonstration was justified because the illegal gathering was part of a premeditated conspiracy to rebellion, which was timed supposedly to coincide with a rumoured Afghan invasion.

Although O'Dwyer had implemented martial law in the Punjab, he denied responsibility for the consequences on the grounds that the government had relieved him of its general implementation. However, he could not disclaim responsibility for the decision, after severe rioting in Gujranwala, to send an aeroplane to bomb and strafe the area. During the course of the operation, at least a dozen people, including children, were killed.

The next year, on 24 June 1920, the opposition Labour Party Conference at Scarborough unanimously passed a resolution, which denounced the "cruel and barbarous actions" of British colonial officials in Punjab and demanded they be put on trial, the dismissal of O'Dwyer and Chelmsford and the repeal of the Rowlatt Act. The delegates rose in their places as a tribute to those killed at Jallianwala Bagh. After the Punjab disturbances, O'Dwyer was relieved of his office.

O'Dwyer supported Irish Home Rule. Shortly before the Amritsar Massacre, he declared that home rule was "a lofty and generous ideal" which Ireland deserved, but one that India was not yet "fit" for. The difference, he said, was that self-government was a status "which in one form or another Ireland had for centuries enjoyed," whereas Indians were intellectually incapable of handling home rule. He claimed that most of them had been "groping blindly through all stages of civilisation from the fifth to the twentieth century."

In December 1923 the Limerick Brigade of the Irish Republican Army informed the IRA's Chief of Staff that O'Dwyer would be killed while he was staying with his brother at the family farm in Barronstown. The letter noted that "shooting is too good for him". The action was not carried out however amidst the turmoil within the organisation due to the Irish Civil War.

== O'Dwyer v. Nair ==
In 1922, Sir Sankaran Nair referred to O'Dwyer in his book Gandhi and Anarchy and stated that "before the reforms it was in the power of the Lieutenant-Governor, a single individual, to commit the atrocities in the Punjab which we know only too well". O'Dwyer subsequently successfully sued Nair for libel and was awarded £500 damages. Heard before Mr Justice McCardie in the King's Bench Division of the High Court in London over five weeks from 30 April 1924, it was one of the longest civil law hearings in legal history. O'Dwyer saw the trial as a way of providing justifications for Dyer's actions at the Jallianwala Bagh massacre.

== Assassination ==
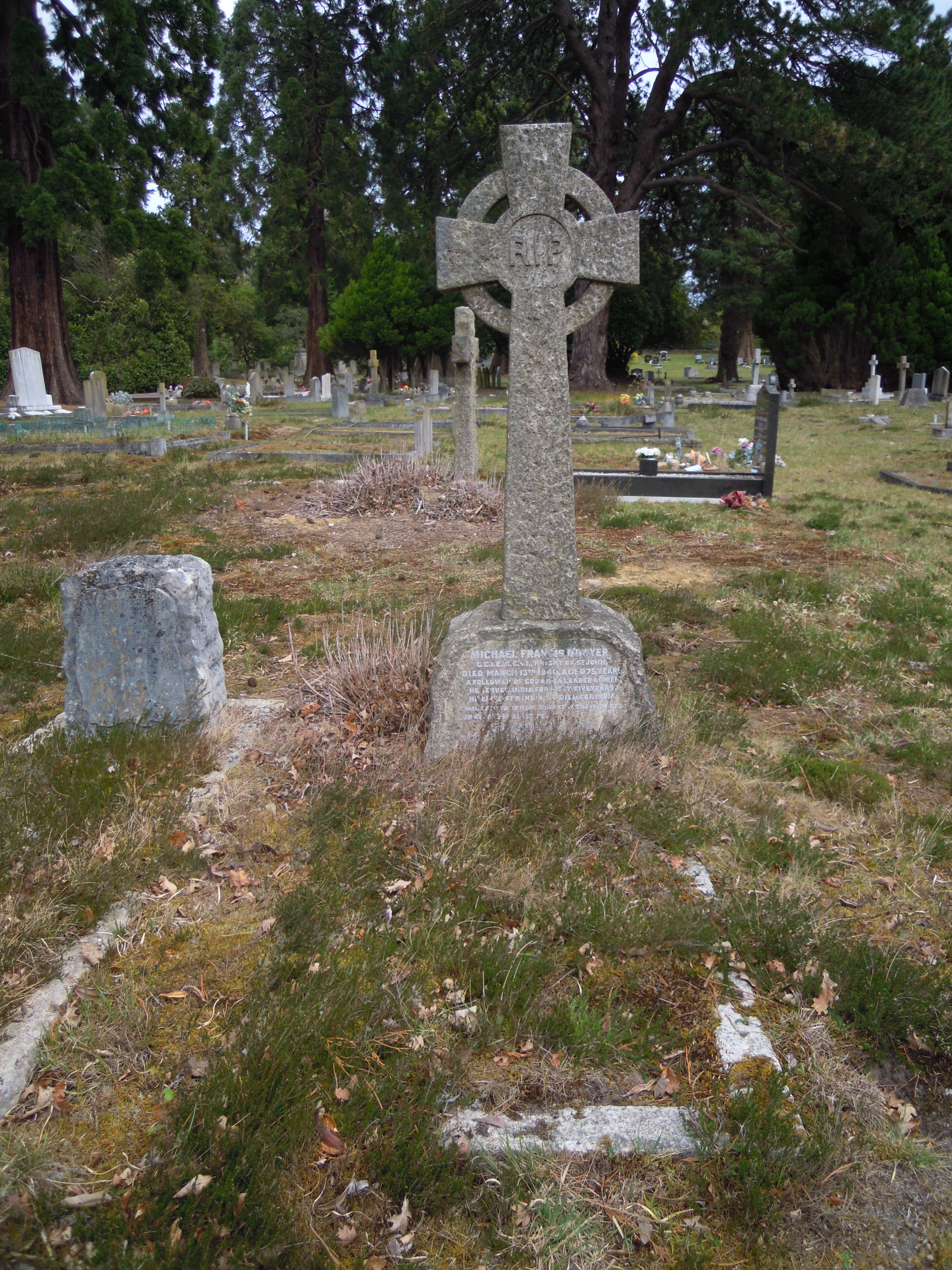
The grave of Michael O'Dwyer in Brookwood Cemetery

O'Dwyer, aged 75, was shot dead at a joint meeting of the East India Association and the Central Asian Society (now Royal Society for Asian Affairs) in Caxton Hall in Westminster, London, on 13 March 1940, by Indian revolutionary, Udham Singh, in retaliation for the massacre in Amritsar.

O'Dwyer was hit by two bullets and died instantly. Lord Zetland, the Secretary of State for India, was presiding over the meeting and was wounded. Zetland, recovering from his injuries, later opted for early retirement from his position of Secretary of State for India and was succeeded by Leo Amery as Secretary of State for India. Udham Singh made no attempt to escape and was arrested at the scene. O'Dwyer was later buried in Brookwood Cemetery, near Woking.

At his trial, Singh told the court:

I did it because I had a grudge against him. He deserved it. He was the real culprit. He wanted to crush the spirit of my people, so I have crushed him. For full 21 years, I have been trying to wreak vengeance. I am happy that I have done the job. I am not scared of death. I am dying for my country. I have seen my people starving in India under the British rule. I have protested against this, it was my duty. What a greater honour could be bestowed on me than death for the sake of my motherland?

== Personal life and family ==
He married Una Eunice, daughter of Antoine Bord of Castres, France, on 21 November 1896. The couple had two children. She established 'Lady O'Dwyer's Punjab Comforts Fund', one of several charitable organisations created in India during the First World War to raise money and other gifts to provide comforts for troops serving with the Indian Army. She was created a Dame Commander of the Order of the British Empire in her own right in the 1919 Birthday Honours, in which their daughter, Una Mary O'Dwyer, was created a Member of the Order of the British Empire. In the late 1930s, O'Dwyer became a member of the Liberty Restoration League, a front organisation for the pro-Nazi Nordic League.

== Arms ==
Coat of arms of Michael O'Dwyer
Notes Granted by Sir Nevile Rodwell Wilkinson, 18th September 1937. Crest A hand couped at the wrist and erect grasping a sword all Proper. Escutcheon Argent a lion rampant Gules armed Or langued Azure between three Ermine spots Sable. Motto Virtus Sola Nobilitas

== Writing ==
In his book India as I knew it (1925), O'Dwyer disclosed that his time as administrator in Punjab was preoccupied by the threat of terrorism and the spread of political agitation.

In 1933, he published The O'Dwyers of Kilnamanagh: The History of an Irish Sept, a historical and genealogical treatise detailing the O'Dwyer (Ó Duibhir) noble family that had commanded the area around Thurles from the pre-Norman era until it lost its castles and land during the Cromwellian confiscations of the 17th century.

In later life, he wrote frequently to The Times to condemn the Gandhian non-cooperation movement and to endorse British rule in India.

=== Selected publications ===
==== Articles ====
- "Border Countries of the Punjab Himalaya: Discussion". The Geographical Journal. Vol. 60, No. 4 (1922), pp. 264–68. doi:10.2307/1781310. Co-authored with Louis Dane and W. Coldstream.
- "Races and Religions in the Punjab". Journal of the Royal Society of Arts, London. Vol. 74, Issue 3827 (26 March 1926), pp. 420–449.

==== Books ====
- War Speeches Of His Honour Sir Michael O'Dwyer. Lahore: Superintendent Government Printing. 1918.
- India as I knew it. London: Constable & Company (1925)
- The O'Dwyers of Kilnamanagh: The History of an Irish Sept, London: J. Murray, (1933). OCLC 8381000
- Fusion of Anglo Norman and Gael. London: Burns, Oates & Washbourne, (1938?). OCLC 866019570

==== Book chapters ====
- "Kipling — "Some Recollections"". In: Orel H. (eds) Kipling. London: Palgrave Macmillan, (1983). ISBN 978-1-349-05108-3

== In popular culture ==
He was portrayed by Dave Anderson in the 2000 Indian film Shaheed Udham Singh and by Shaun Scott in the 2021 Indian film Sardar Udham.
