= Place v Searle =

1932 English court case

- Decided: 1932

Court membership
- Judge sitting: Henry McCardie

Place v Searle, also known as the Helen of Troy case (1932) was a trial in English law in which John Dover Place, a Cambridge grocer's assistant, sued local doctor Charles Frederick Searle for allegedly persuading Place's wife to leave him, seeking damages for loss of her companionship. For nearly two centuries, husbands could claim such damages, but Justice McCardie dismissed the rule, declaring that a married woman was free to leave her husband. The Court of Appeal later overturned his decision, with Lord Justice Scrutton criticising McCardie for failing to give the jury proper legal guidance and adding that an unmarried judge should not comment on marital relations.

== Background ==
John Dover Place was a grocer's assistant in Cambridge. Gwendoline was his wife.

Charles Frederick Searle was a local doctor who had served the Northamptonshire Regiment in the First World War, during which he saw action with the 4th Battalion at Gallipoli and Palestine. Though injured at the Second Battle of Gaza, he declined light work and returned to the battlefield, gaining a reputation for being fearless. A supporter of the suffragette movement, he was known for helping women who had been harmed or assaulted.

Justice Henry McCardie when guiding juries, often added his own view of how the law ought to be.

The law of enticement refers to the historical tort that allowed a husband to sue another person for inducing his wife to leave him. (Note: In England and Wales, this law was abolished in 1970.)

== Trial ==
Place sued Searle for allegedly persuading his wife to leave him, seeking damages for loss of her companionship.

== Verdict ==
Justice McCardie dismissed the rule, declaring that a married woman was free to leave her husband.

== Appeal ==
The Court of Appeal later overturned his decision, with Lord Justice Scrutton criticising McCardie for failing to give the jury proper legal guidance and adding that an unmarried judge should not comment on marital relations.
