= Peter the Great: His Law on the Imperial Succession =

1996 book

- Author: Antony Lentin
- Language: English
- Genre: History
- Publication date: 1996

Peter the Great: His Law on the Imperial Succession (1996) is a book about Peter the Great by Antony Lentin. British historian Paul Dukes, and American historian James Cracraft describe it as "scholarly", with "extensive notes and commentary".
