= Antony Lentin =

Anthony Lentin
- Born: 1941 (age 84–85)
- Occupations: Barrister; History tutor
- Known for: Studies of Lloyd George, Henry McCardie

Academic work
- Institutions: Open University; Wolfson College, Cambridge
- Notable works: Lloyd George, Woodrow Wilson and the Guilt of Germany (1984); Peter the Great: His Law on the Imperial Succession (1996); Banker, Traitor, Scapegoat, Spy? (2013); Mr Justice McCardie (1869-1933) (2016)

Antony Lentin, also known as Tony, (born 1941) is a British scholar, former barrister, and professor of history and law at the Open University. He is a distinguished member of Wolfson College, Cambridge, and a fellow of the Royal Historical Society.

Known for his studies on Lloyd George, Lentin uses the statesman's career to examine broader themes such as Germany’s position after the First World War, the impact of the war, the making of liberal foreign policies, how peace treaties shaped future conflicts, and the controversies surrounding appeasement. His major works include Lloyd George, Woodrow Wilson and the Guilt of Germany (1984), The Versailles peace settlement : peacemaking with Germany (1991), and Lloyd George and the Lost Peace: From Versailles to Hitler, 1919-1940 (2001).

== Works ==
Lentin's research has covered a range of historical figures and topics. He has written on Peter the Great, with British historian Paul Dukes, and American historian James Cracraft describing Peter the Great: His Law on the Imperial Succession (1996) as "scholarly", with "extensive notes and commentary". He has also written on Catherine the Great.

Lentin has focused particularly on Lloyd George, using the statesman's career to explore wider issues including Germany’s role after the First World War, the impact of the war, the making of liberal foreign policies, how peace treaties shaped future conflicts, and debates over appeasement. His major works include Lloyd George, Woodrow Wilson and the Guilt of Germany (1984), The Versailles peace settlement: peacemaking with Germany (1991), and Lloyd George and the Lost Peace: From Versailles to Hitler, 1919-1940 (2001). His other works includes studies of Lord Sumner, and General Smuts's role at the 1919 Paris Peace Conference. The peace settlement of 1919 has in addition been a feature of several of his journal articles.

Later, Lentin studied and wrote on Edgar Speyer. In his biography of Speyer, Banker, Traitor, Scapegoat, Spy? The Troublesome Case of Sir Edgar Speyer (2013), Lentin states that Speyer was crucial to funding Captain Scott's Antarctic expeditions, developing the London Underground, and founding proms.

After contributing an entry on Justice McCardie to the Oxford Dictionary of National Biography, Lentin went on to research and write his full length biography, Mr Justice McCardie (1869-1933): Rebel, Reformer, and Rogue Judge (2016). It includes a detailed chapter on the O'Dwyer v. Nair Libel Case of 1924.

== Selected publications ==
=== Books ===
- Russia in the Eighteenth Century: From Peter the Great to Catherine the Great [1696-1796). Heinemann Educational. 1973. ISBN 978-0-435-32523-7.
- Lloyd George, Woodrow Wilson and the Guilt of Germany: An Essay in the Pre-history of Appeasement. Leicester University Press. 1984. ISBN 978-0-7185-1251-4.
- The Versailles peace settlement : peacemaking with Germany. London : Historical Association. 1991. ISBN 978-0-85278-324-5.
- Peter the Great: His Law on the Imperial Succession : the Official Commentary (Pravda Voli Monarshei). Oxford: Headstart History. 1996. ISBN 978-1-85943-001-9.
- Lloyd George and the Lost Peace: From Versailles to Hitler, 1919-1940. Springer. 2001. ISBN 978-0-230-51148-4.
- The Last Political Law Lord: Lord Sumner (1859-1934). Cambridge Scholars Publishing. 2008. ISBN 978-1-4438-0381-6.
- General Smuts: South Africa. Haus Publishing. 2010. ISBN 978-1-907822-07-0.
- Banker, Traitor, Scapegoat, Spy?: The Troublesome Case of Sir Edgar Speyer. Haus Publishing. 2013. ISBN 978-1-908323-17-0.
- Mr Justice McCardie (1869-1933): Rebel, Reformer, and Rogue Judge. Cambridge Scholars Publishing. 2016. ISBN 978-1-4438-7864-7.

=== Articles ===
- "Trick or treat? The Anglo-French Alliance, 1919". History Today. 42 (12): 28. 1 December 1992.
- "Several types of ambiguity: Lloyd George at the Paris peace conference". Diplomacy and Statecraft. 1 March 1995. doi:10.1080/09592299508405960.
- "'Une aberration inexplicable'? Clemenceau and the abortive Anglo‐French guarantee treaty of 1919". Diplomacy and Statecraft. 1 July 1997. doi:10.1080/09592299708406042.
- "Maynard Keynes and the 'Bamboozlement' of Woodrow Wilson: What Really Happened at Paris? (Wilson, Lloyd George, pensions and pre-armistice agreement)". Diplomacy & Statecraft. 15 (4): 725–763. 1 December 2004. doi:10.1080/09592290490886829. ISSN 0959-2296.
- "Germany: a New Carthage?". History Today. 62 (1): 20. 1 January 2012.
