= Mr Justice McCardie (1869-1933) =

2016 book by Antony Lentin

Mr Justice McCardie (1869-1933): Rebel, Reformer, and Rogue Judge
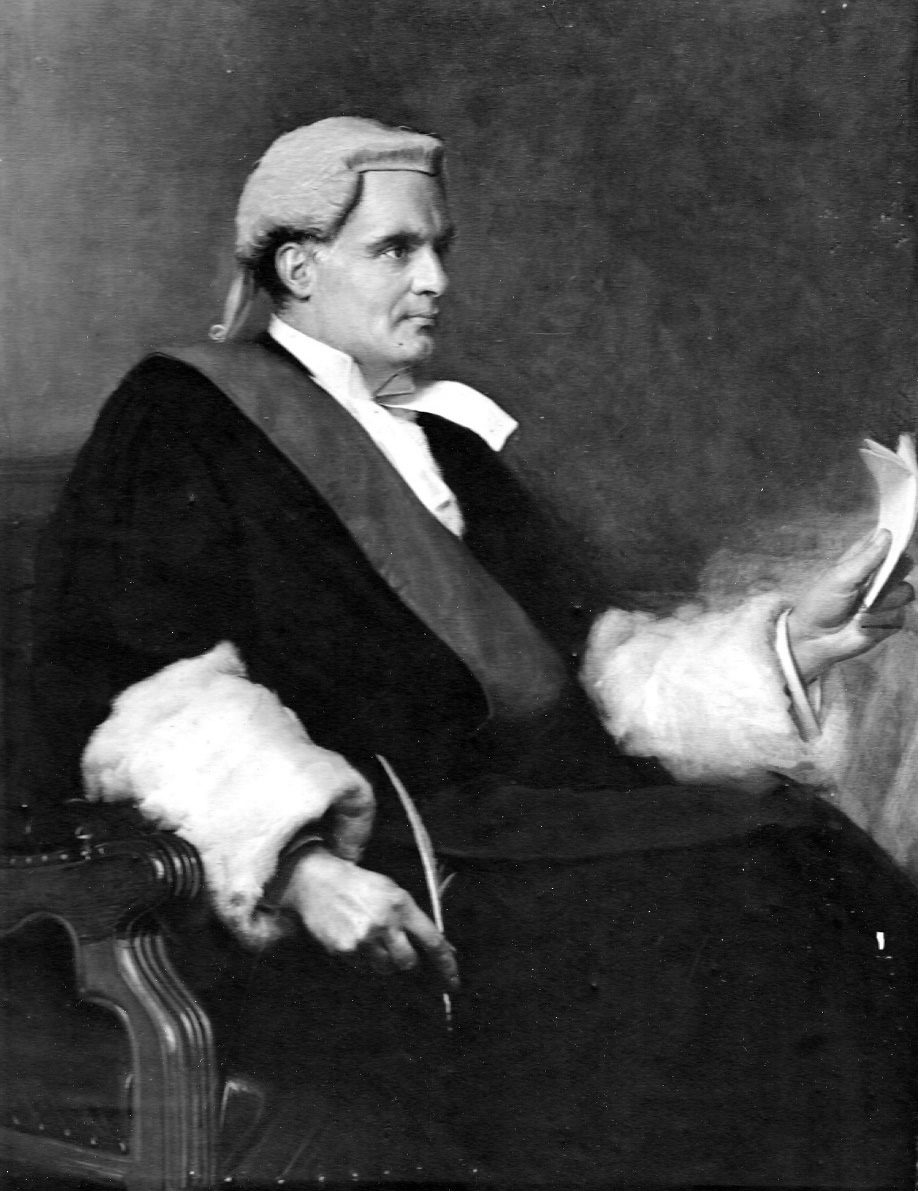
- Justice McCardie, as appears on book cover
- Author: Antony Lentin
- Language: English
- Genre: History
- Publisher: Cambridge Scholars Publishing
- Publication date: 2016
- ISBN: 978-1-4438-9780-8

Mr Justice McCardie (1869-1933): Rebel, Reformer, and Rogue Judge is a book about Justice Henry McCardie by Antony Lentin, published in 2016 by Cambridge Scholars Publishing. It spans McCardie’s entire life, from his upbringing and path to the Bar, to his contentious judicial career and final act by suicide.

Lentin explains how after contributing an entry on McCardie to the Oxford Dictionary of National Biography, he went on to research and write this full length biography of a Judge who ruled on cases and instructed juries on the law, often suggesting what he believed the law should be. His chapters on two particular trials, are used as examples of where McCardie faced public confrontations; the O'Dwyer v. Nair Libel Case (1924), and the case of Place v Searle (1932).

In the Cambridge Law Journal, Anthony Grabiner notes Lentin for presenting McCardie as a complex figure, progressive in his advocacy for divorce reform and women's rights, yet controversial for breaking judicial conventions. Lentin, Michael Beloff notes in The Spectator, describes how McCardie handled cases and guided juries, often adding his own view of how the law ought to be. In the official journal of the Ecclesiastical Law Society, the book is noted to be thoroughly referenced, but its chapters might have been easier to follow if they included subsections.

== Publication ==
Mr Justice McCardie (1869-1933): Rebel, Reformer, and Rogue Judge, a biography of Justice Henry McCardie, was written by British historian and barrister Antony Lentin and published by Cambridge Scholars Publishing, 100 years after McCardie's appointment to the High Court Bench.

== Content ==
The book spans McCardie’s entire life, from his upbringing and path to the Bar, to his contentious judicial career and final act by suicide. Seven chapters follow a list of illustrations, acknowledgements, preface, and an introduction, and precede abbreviations, notes, a bibliography, and an index. The preface reveals the bust of a largely forgotten McCardie sculptured by Marguerite Milward and on display in the Queen's Room in the Middle Temple.

In the introduction, Lentin explains how after contributing an entry on McCardie to the Oxford Dictionary of National Biography, he went on to research and write this full length biography of a Judge who ruled on cases and instructed juries on the law, often suggesting what he believed the law should be. His chapters on two particular trials, are used as examples of where McCardie faced public confrontations. The third chapter titled "Storm over Amritsar" focuses on the O'Dwyer v. Nair Libel Case (1924), in which McCardie concluded that Reginald Dyer was right in his actions at Amritsar 1919, breaking legal convention and opposing the government’s view of the massacre. Criticised by the then prime minister Ramsay MacDonald as "unfortunate", McCardie threatened to resign, sought support unsuccessfully, and publicly defended himself. Chapter five, "Women's rights and Judicial Fisticuffs: the case of Place v Searle", describes how McCardie dismissed a long standing legal claim when a husband sued a doctor for loss of his wife's company, ruling that a wife was free to leave her husband. The Court of Appeal overturned his decision, and Lord Justice Scrutton criticised him, adding that an unmarried judge should not comment on marriage.

== Reception ==
In Anthony Grabiner's review of the book in the Cambridge Law Journal, he calls the work an "excellent example" of how understanding McCardie's life provides deep insight into historical events. Lentin is noted for presenting McCardie as a complex figure, progressive in his advocacy for divorce reform and women's rights, yet controversial for breaking judicial conventions. In The Spectator, Michael Beloff wrote that Lentin effectively demonstrates why the Law Quarterly Review, regarded as the leading law journal, described McCardie in his obituary as one of the most interesting figures on the English bench. Lentin, Beloff notes, describes how McCardie ruled on cases and instructed juries on the law, often suggesting what he believed the law should be. Nigel Pascoe in Counsel noted McCardie to be a "living legend and crusader, but also as a judicial infidel and a rogue judge running amock", and said that "Lentin has combined deep scholarship with vivid imagery, creating a fitting tribute to an extraordinary and populist figure, whose personality and achievements deserve to be remembered". In the official journal of the Ecclesiastical Law Society, the book is noted to be thoroughly referenced, but its chapters might have been easier to follow if they included subsections. In the Times, Lentin is seen as showing respect to McCardie, "though like all good lawyers he is scrupulous in recognising the strengths of the other side’s argument and ultimately leaves it to the reader to decide which of the two camps to join".
