= Banker, Traitor, Scapegoat, Spy? The Troublesome Case of Sir Edgar Speyer =

2013 book

- Author: Antony Lentin
- Language: English
- Genre: History
- Publisher: Haus Publishing
- Publication date: 2013

Banker, Traitor, Scapegoat, Spy? The Troublesome Case of Sir Edgar Speyer is a book about by Antony Lentin, published in 2013 by Haus Publishing. It explores the life of Edgar Speyer, highlighting his key role in funding Captain Scott's Antarctic expeditions, expanding the London Underground, and helping establish the proms. Lentin also draws on the trial transcript and a Home Office file on Speyer, documents that remained classified until 2003 and were uncovered during his research.
