= Lloyd George, Woodrow Wilson and the Guilt of Germany =

1984 book

- Author: Antony Lentin
- Language: English
- Genre: History
- Publisher: Leicester University Press (UK) (1984); Louisiana State University Press (US) (1985)
- Publication date: 1984
- Pages: 193
- ISBN: 0-8071-1231-3

Lloyd George, Woodrow Wilson and the Guilt of Germany: An Essay in the Pre-History of Appeasement (1984) is a historical book first published by Leicester University Press in 1984. It is authored by Antony Lentin, who studied the aftermath of the First World War, focussing on the Paris Peace Conference and treaty negotiations. It looks at the difficulties of reshaping borders, addressing defeated nations, building international institutions, and the influence of intellectuals, while also examining the longterm impact on world order.

== Publication ==
Lloyd George, Woodrow Wilson and the Guilt of Germany by Antony Lentin, was published by Leicester University Press in 1984 and by Louisiana State University Press the following year.

== Layout ==
On the page facing the title page there is an image of David Lloyd George leaving France after signing the Treaty of Versailles. The introduction precedes six chapters; Armistice, Peacekeeping, Draftmanship, Versailles, The Peacemakers, and The Carthaginian Peace. This is followed by a list of references, a bibliography, and an index. Interspersed throughout the work are six images including that of Lloyd George, Woodrow Wilson, Georges Clemenceau, Lord Sumner, and Count Brockdorff-Rantzau. There are 193 pages.
