= The Law, the Advocate, and the Judge =

The Law, the Advocate, and the Judge is the title of a lecture delivered by Justice Henry McCardie at the Middle Temple in 1927. Its print appeared in the Solicitors' Law Stationery Society.
