= Haus Publishing =

British publishing company

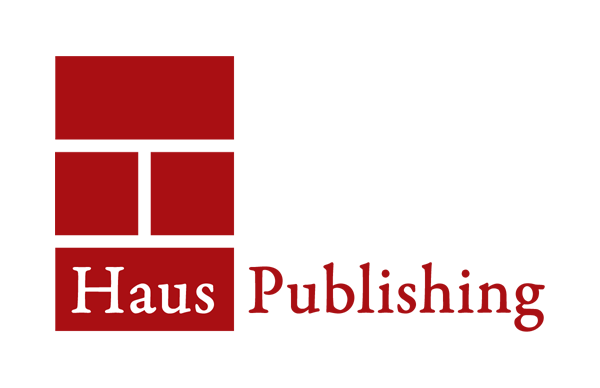
- Status: Active
- Founded: 2002
- Country of origin: United Kingdom
- Headquarters location: London
- Distribution: Macmillan Distribution; Chicago Distribution Center
- Publication types: Books
- Imprints: Arabia Books
- Official website: hauspublishing.com

Haus Publishing is a London-based publishing company which was established in 2001.

== History ==
Haus Publishing was founded in 2001 by Barbara Schwepcke, the former publisher of Prospect magazine. Starting with biography, the list now includes history, politics, current affairs, and travelogues published under the Armchair Traveller imprint.

- 2005: Launched the Armchair Traveller imprint to publish international travel writing
- 2014: Introduced the Haus Curiosities series—short works of opinion and analysis by leading public figures—under series editor Peter Hennessy
- September 2019: Appointed Ali M. Ansari as contributing editor to the Haus Curiosities series

== Arabia Books ==
Arabia Books was founded as a joint venture by Haus Publishing and the independent UK publisher Arcadia Books in March 2008. The imprint published contemporary fiction in translation from the Arabic. Arcadia left the partnership after a few years and Arabia Books was formerly dissolved in 2026.
