= 8-inch Howitzer =

An 8-inch howitzer is a howitzer with an 8-inch bore. Examples include:

- BL 8-inch howitzer Mk I–V - British design of WWI
- BL 8-inch howitzer Mk VI – VIII - British design of later World War I, used in World War II
- M115 howitzer - US design
