= Henry McCardie =

British judge (1869-1933)

Sir Henry McCardie
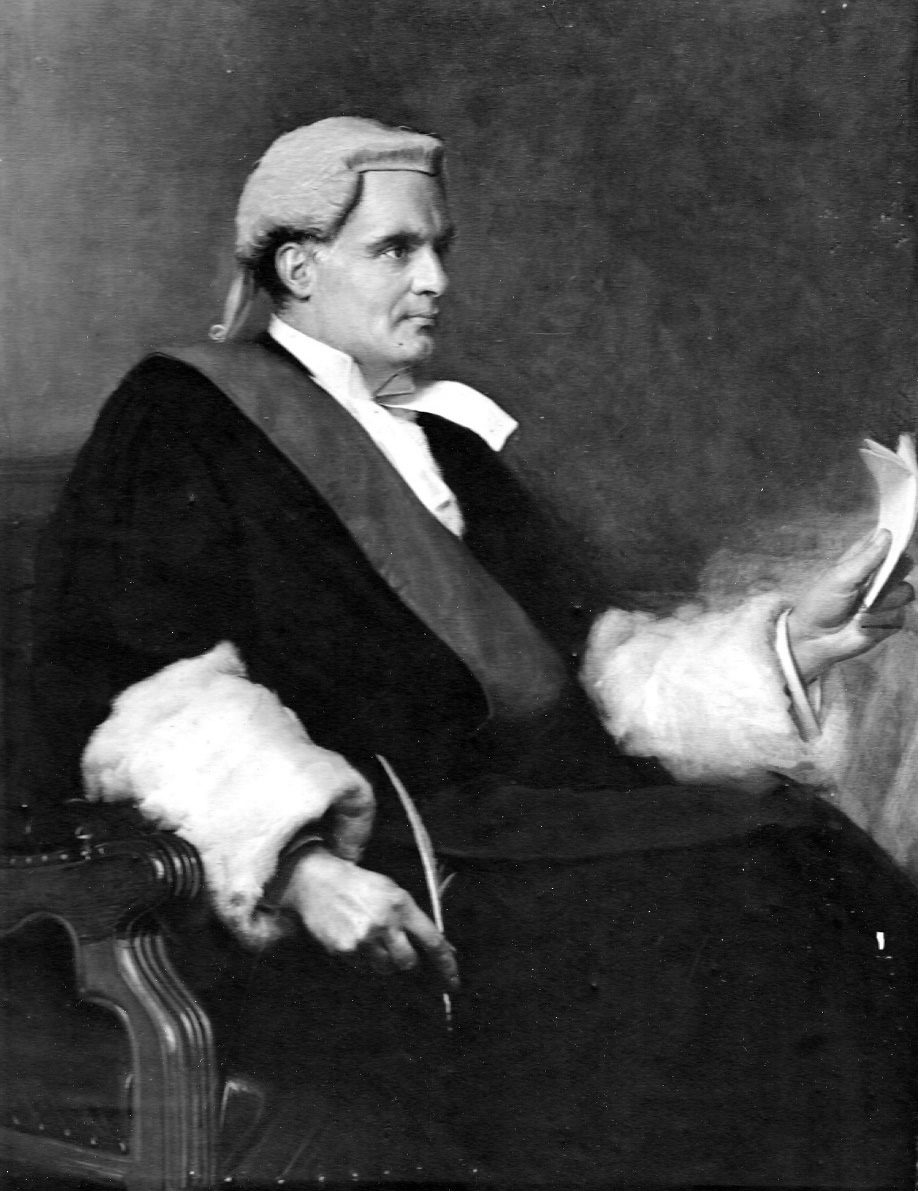

Justice of the High Court
- In office 1916–1933
- Appointed by: Stanley Buckmaster
- Preceded by: Thomas Edward Scrutton

Personal details
- Born: 19 July 1869 Edgbaston, Birmingham, England
- Died: 26 April 1933 (aged 63)
- Cause of death: Suicide
- Profession: Barrister, judge

Sir Henry Alfred McCardie (19 July 1869 – 26 April 1933) was a controversial British judge. Educated at King Edward's School, Birmingham he left school at 16 and spent several years working for an auctioneer before qualifying as a barrister and being called to the Bar in 1894. Despite his lack of a university degree and the business connections that went with it McCardie built up a successful practice in Birmingham and the Midland and Oxford Circuit through a combination of clear arguments, confident advocacy and intense work; he worked so late in his chambers that they became known as "the lighthouse". He moved to London to continue work in 1904 and was a popular barrister, on one day handling twenty-one cases in twenty-one different courts. At the peak of his career, he was earning £20,000 while still a junior barrister; a large amount for that period.

He was appointed as a judge of the High Court King's Bench Division in 1916 at the personal recommendation of the Prime Minister H. H. Asquith despite only being a junior barrister (his application to become a King's Counsel in 1910 had been withdrawn), a rarity as most High Court judges were KCs. He became known for two things; firstly the quality and detail of his written judgments, and secondly his tendency to rebel against the judicial norm and criticise the system, which prevented him from advancing further up the judicial hierarchy. He was popular with the Bar and became a bencher of the Middle Temple in 1916 and a reader in 1927, but received much criticism from the judiciary for his judgements. After several bouts of illness and depression while on circuit he committed suicide on 26 April 1933 in his flat. Numerous theories have been advanced as to the cause of the fatal act, and it may be that it resulted from a combination of several causes.

== Biography ==
=== Early life and education ===
McCardie was born on 19 July 1869 in Edgbaston to Joseph McCardie, an Irish merchant and button maker, and his English wife Jane Hunt. His father died when McCardie was eight, and as a result he and his six siblings were raised by their mother alone. He was educated at King Edward's School, Birmingham and was noted as intelligent but lazy. He left the school when he was sixteen to get a job and for several years worked in an auctioneer's office before being admitted to the Middle Temple in 1891. He was called to the bar on 18 April 1894 and almost immediately began work at the chambers of James Parfit (known as J.J. Parfit) in Birmingham.

=== At the Bar ===
McCardie became well known on the Midlands and Oxford Circuit for his clear arguments and the amount of time he spent working on cases and studying the law as to present the best case for his client; he worked so late that his chamber became known as "the lighthouse" as there was always a light on in the windows. He was frequently called upon by solicitors to present cases, whether alone or with a KC, and at the height of his career was earning over £20,000. During his time at the bar McCardie represented large organisations such as railway companies and banks, and was a popular barrister. On one occasion he and the QC he was working with, Edward Marshall-Hall, walked out of court in the middle of a case; it was felt that such a popular and effective junior barrister McCardie must have been in the right in doing so . McCardie applied to Lord Loreburn, the Lord Chancellor to become a King's Counsel in 1910, but the delay while Reid considered the application harmed McCardie's business, and he withdrew it. In 1916, on the promotion of Sir Thomas Scrutton to the Court of Appeal, he was asked to become a judge in the High Court of Justice King's Bench division, something considered extraordinary as most High Court judges were KCs.

=== High Court judge ===
As a judge, McCardie used common language to make his judgements easier to understand, but at the same time, he also made them very long and detailed. He was noted for his tendency to rebel against the opinions held by the rest of the judiciary and much of society as a whole; as early as 1931 he was supportive of the legalisation of abortion, saying that "I cannot think it right that a woman should be forced to bear a child against her will". Earlier, in the O'Dwyer v. Nair Libel Case, he led the jury's decision in the libel against the Indian politician and lawyer Sir C. Sankaran Nair, by former Lieutenant Governor of the Punjab, Sir Michael O'Dwyer. He made several judgments in areas that previously had no case law; in Cohen v Sellar [1926] 1 KB 536 he decided that a fiancée who breaks off the engagement is not entitled to the return of the ring, and his ruling in Hartley v Hymans [1920] 3 KB 475 was one of the cases used by Lord Denning in his resurrection of promissory estoppel. His decisions and his differing opinions from that of the judiciary as a whole led to criticism from the Lord Chancellor and Lord Chief Justice, as well as several members of the Court of Appeal, particularly Scrutton, whose increasingly bitter attacks suggest that he cherished a personal antipathy, which became so extreme that the two men ended by shouting at each other in open court.

=== Death ===
While on circuit in 1933 McCardie caught influenza, and the illness and lack of sleep that resulted from it drove him into a deep depression. On 26 April 1933, he shot himself in his flat; the coroner ruled that it was suicide. After his death, it came out that he had massive gambling debts, and that he was being blackmailed as a result. It was also suggested that his dabbling in the occult had given him a morbid premonition of death, and that he had come to believe that he was fated to die on a certain day. Several other causes have been suggested, including his quarrel with Scrutton, and it is possible that in his depressed condition a number of factors contributed to the act.

In 2003, McCardie was identified in the autobiography "Mr Hardie" by Henry Archer as his father; the kind but secretive gentleman known to him by his mother as Mr Hardie and who went on holiday with them turned out to be Sir Henry McCardie.

Henry Cecil wrote in his memoir Just Within the Law that "I have only the happiest memories of appearing before him".

== Selected works ==
- The Law, the Advocate, and the Judge

== See also ==
- Mr Justice McCardie (1869-1933) (2016)

== Bibliography ==
- Lentin, Antony (2017). Mr Justice McCardie (1869-1933): Rebel, Reformer, and Rogue Judge. Cambridge Scholars Publishing. ISBN 978-1-4438-7864-7.
