= James Cracraft =

American historian

James Cracraft is an historian of Russia who is professor emeritus of history at the University of Illinois Chicago. He was a Guggenheim Fellow in 1999.

== Selected publications ==
- The Church Reform of Peter the Great. Stanford University Press, 1971.
- For God and Peter the Great: The Works of Thomas Consett, 1723-1729. East European Monographs 96/Columbia University Press, 1981. (Editor)
- The Soviet Union Today: An Interpretive Guide. University of Chicago Press, 1983. (Editor, joint author)
- The Petrine Revolution in Russian Architecture. University of Chicago Press, 1988.
- Peter the Great Transforms Russia. Houghton Mifflin Harcourt, 1991. (Editor, joint author.)
- Major Problems in the History of Imperial Russia. Houghton Mifflin Harcourt, 1994. (Editor, joint author.)
- The Petrine Revolution in Russian Imagery. University of Chicago Press, 1997.
- The Revolution of Peter the Great. Harvard University Press, 2003.
- Architectures of Russian Identity: 1500 to the Present. Cornell University Press, 2003. (Co-editor with Daniel Rowland, joint author.)
- The Petrine Revolution in Russian Culture. The Belknap Press of Harvard University Press, 2004.
- Two Shining Souls: Jane Addams, Leo Tolstoy, and the Quest for Global Peace. Lexington Books, 2012.

== See also ==
- Lindsey Hughes
