= Defence of the Magazine at Delhi =

Battle of the Indian Rebellion of 1857

- Part of the Indian Rebellion of 1857
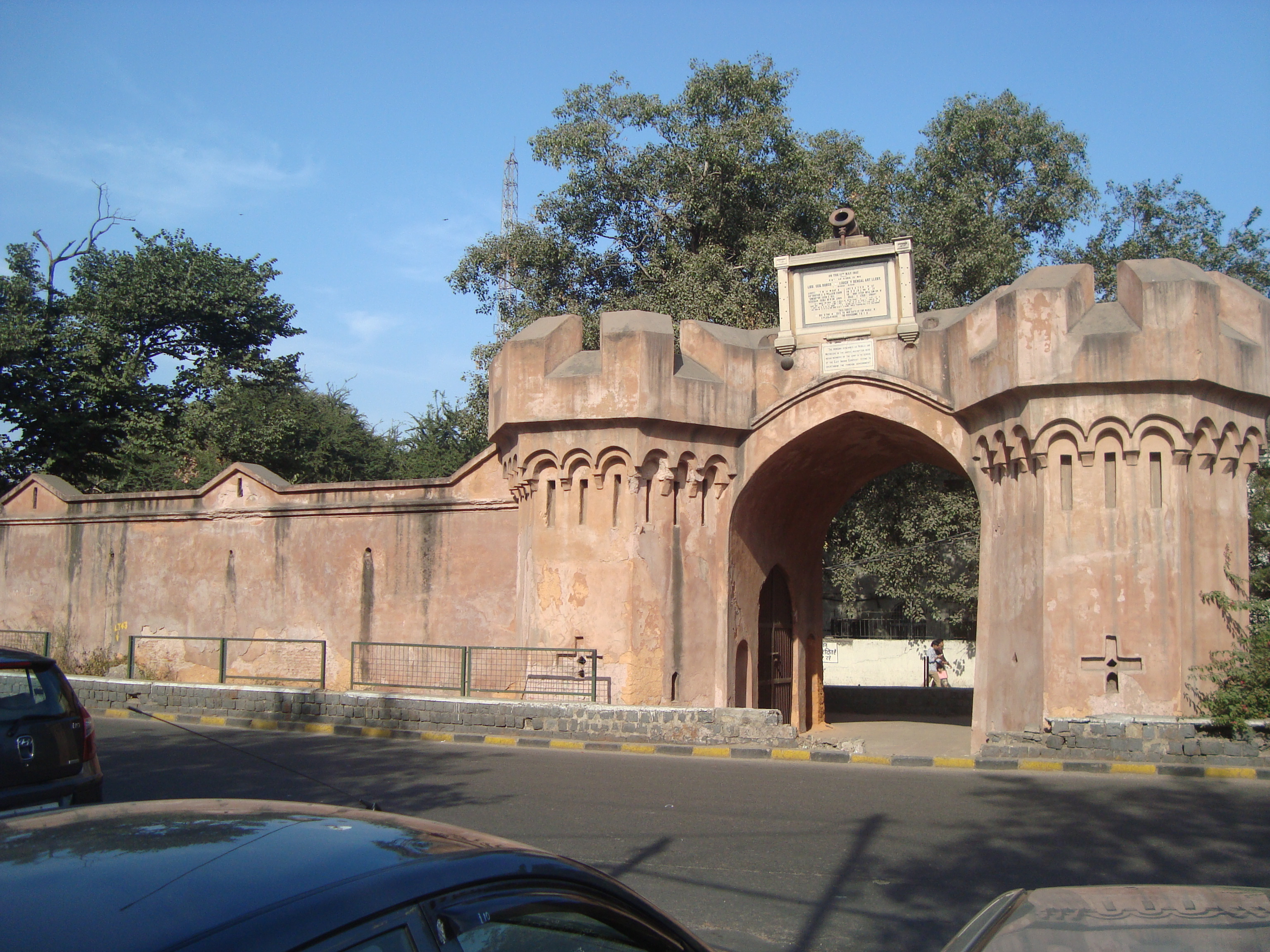
- One of the two remaining gates to the magazine, featuring a memorial tablet to its defenders
Date	11 May 1857
Location	Delhi, British India 28.6621°N 77.2344°E
Result	The destruction of the magazine

Belligerents
East India Company	Mughal Empire

Commanders and leaders
George Willoughby	Bahadur Shah II

Units involved
Bengal Artillery	11th Regiment of Bengal Native Infantry; 20th Regiment of Bengal Native Infantry

Strength
9 (Note: A tenth man, Park Sergeant Hoyle, was shot by the mutineers at about 11am whilst attempting to reach the magazine to aid in its defence.); 3 officers; 4 warrant officers; 2 sergeants	Several hundreds (Note: Estimates of the strength and casualties of the sepoys vary, but most sources estimate hundreds. The Hindu nationalist historian Vinayak Damodar Savarkar stated in his The Indian War of Independence (1909) that thousands of sepoys stormed the magazine whilst only 25 died in the explosion along with 300 men in neighbouring streets, whilst Philip A. Wilkins in The History of the Victoria Cross (1904) stated that more than one thousand mutineers were killed in the blast.)

Casualties and losses
5 killed (Note: A sixth, Lieutenant Willoughby, was killed whilst escaping to Meerut the following day.)	Several hundreds

The Defence of the Magazine at Delhi was an action of 11 May 1857 during the Indian Mutiny in which nine British soldiers of the East India Company defended the magazine at Delhi from rebelling sepoys. After more than four hours fighting against hundreds of attackers, and in order to deny the munitions to the enemy, the British defenders detonated the magazine, themselves with it.

== Background ==
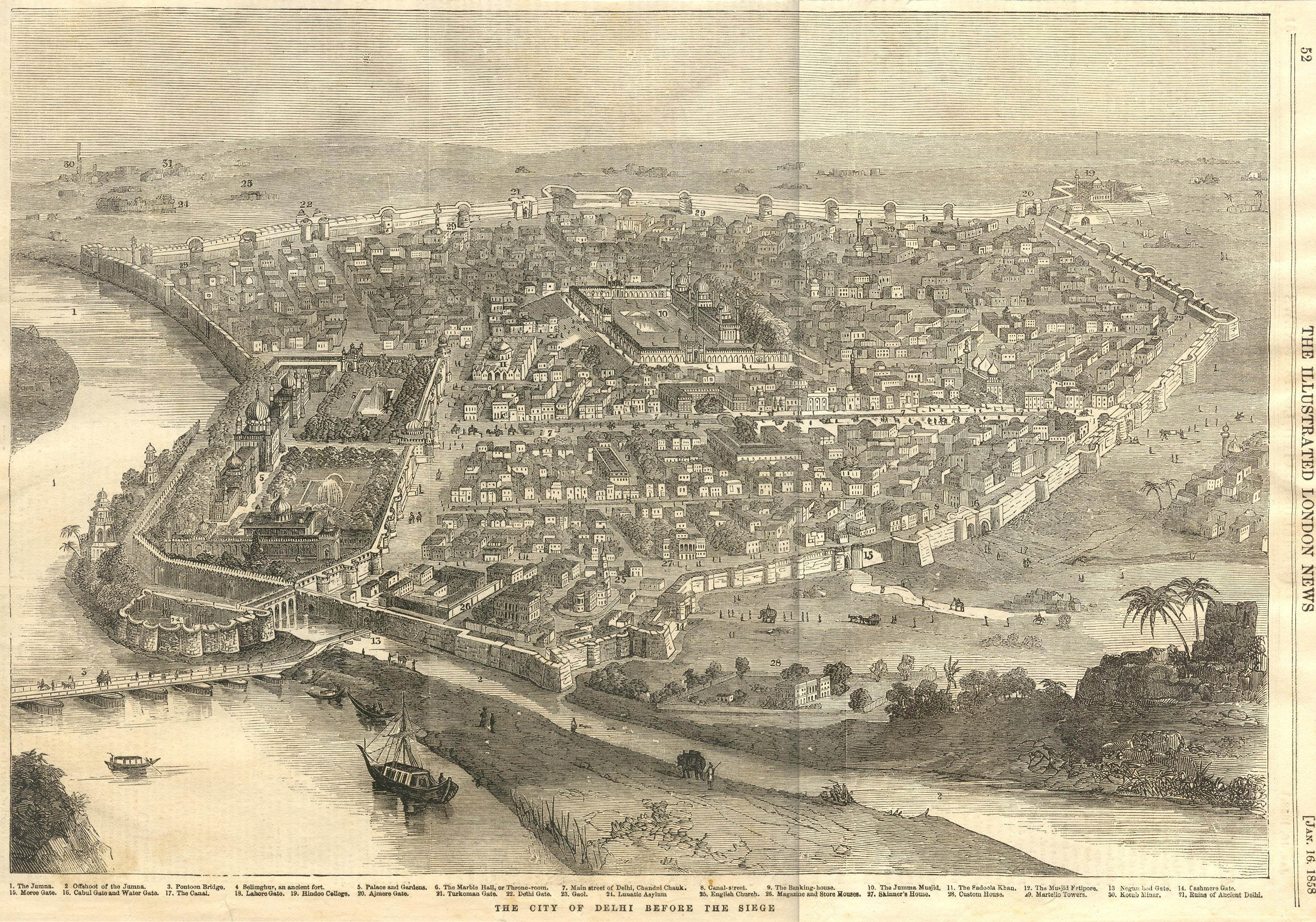
A depiction of the city before the action, with the magazine marked '26'.

The walled city of Delhi was the seat of the titular Mughal Emperor Bahadur Shah Zafar. It was also the site of a British artillery and munitions magazine which was sited just north of the Red Fort (with a second, larger magazine sited three miles outside the city). By special treaty, no British troops were lodged in Delhi itself and the city was garrisoned by sepoys of the 38th, 54th, and 74th Sepoy regiments, with a battery of Sepoy artillery, each led by British officers.

On Sunday 10th May 1857, sepoys stationed at Meerut, approximately 40 miles (64 km) northeast of Delhi, mutinied. General Hewitt, in command of the rebelling forces at Meerut, failed to send warning to Delhi of the events there. Although a civilian on horseback rode to Delhi on Sunday evening to warn Simon Fraser, the British Commissioner at Delhi, Fraser, disturbed from his sleep, refused to read the message until the following morning. The telegraph office at Delhi closed on Sundays during the heat of the day between 9am and 4pm, and by the time it had reopened at 4pm, the wire between Meerut and Delhi had been cut. The British at Delhi were thus entirely unprepared when the rebelling sepoys, headed by the 3rd Bengal Light Cavalry, reached Delhi at dawn on Monday 11th May 1857 to see the Emperor.

On hearing that the mutineers were approaching the city, the magistrate Sir Theophilus Metcalfe, accompanied by Lieutenant Forrest, travelled to the Magazine to collect two guns for the defence of the bridge of boats into the city on the road from Meerut. Joined by Lieutenant Willoughby, who was in charge of the Magazine, they climbed the bastion facing onto the river and observed that the Delhi side of the bridge was already held by rebel cavalry, and a body of mutineers was about to march across. Metcalfe and Willoughby then went to check that the city gate was closed, but the mutineers were admitted directly into the palace where they killed the British officials and civilians, along with any Europeans found in the city. As the city descended into confusion, violence and looting, Willoughby returned to the city's Magazine and prepared to defend it.

== The defence of the Magazine ==
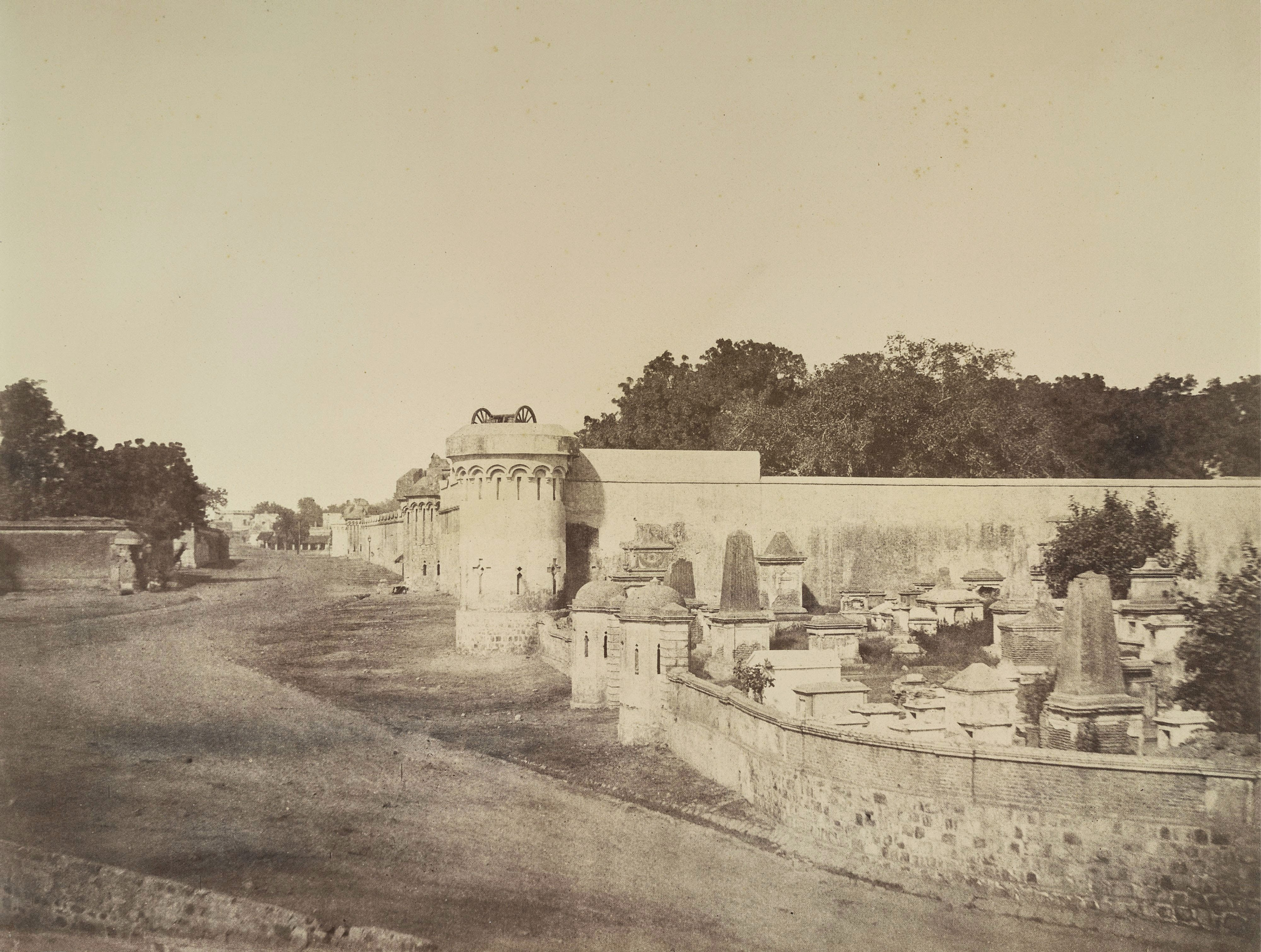
The walls of the Magazine adjoining the Lothian Cemetery, photographed in 1858

The Magazine was defended by nine British soldiers, made up of three officers, three conductors, one acting sub-conductor and two sergeants; all of the Ordnance Commissariat Department of the Bengal Artillery:

- George Dobson Willoughby, a 28-year-old lieutenant in the appointment of Commissary of Ordnance and who commanded the defence
- William Raynor, a 61-year-old lieutenant
- George Forrest, a 57-year-old lieutenant
- John Buckley, a 43-year-old conductor
- George William Shaw, conductor
- John Scully, conductor
- William Crow, acting sub-conductor
- Benjamin Edwards, sergeant
- Peter Stewart, sergeant

The gates to the magazine were closed and barricaded, and Willoughby prepared to defend it in the hope that relief would come from Meerut. Ten guns were arranged in defensive positions, manned by the nine defenders. Two 6-pounder guns doubly charged with grapeshot were placed inside the gate leading to the park. They were manned by Crow and Stewart with orders to fire if the gate was attacked and thence to fall back into the main body of the Magazine. The main gate was also defended by two guns, along with chevaux de frise set up on the inside. Another two 6-pounder guns were arranged to command the gate or a small bastion in its vicinity, and three 6-pounders and one 24-pounder howitzer were set up to command two cross roads. Willoughby also had at his disposal the native establishment of the Magazine which he decided to arm. However, they were reluctant to accept the arms and refused to obey any orders issued by the Europeans. Willoughby ordered Buckley, Scully and Stewart to lay a train to the powder magazine to be lit as a last resort. On Willoughby's command, Buckley was to raise his hat from his head as the signal to light the train, exploding the magazine and its defenders rather than allow the seizure of its munitions. Scully volunteered to be the man to light the train.

Within a short time, palace guards arrived and demanded the surrender of the Magazine in the name of the Emperor. The defenders gave no response. The subadar on guard duty at the magazine then reported to Willoughby and Forrest that the Emperor was sending scaling ladders. The Magazine's native defenders, who were in contact with the mutineers, hid many priming pouches, climbed the sloped shed roofs inside the Magazine and used the scaling ladders to desert, joining the rebels who were chiefly drawn from the 11th and 20th Regiments of Bengal Native Infantry from Meerut. The mutineers then mounted the walls and were fired on by the defenders with grapeshot, with each shot landing true and killing many of the attackers. The British held out for more than four hours, but the attackers were too numerous and closed to within fifty yards of the defenders below, pouring small arms fire on them. Two of the nine were fatally wounded, but Forrest and Buckley continued to rapidly load and fire the guns, firing at least four rounds from each gun by Forrest's account. Their firing stopped when Forrest was shot in his left hand by two musket balls, and Buckley was hit on his arm above the elbow. The mutineers on the walls cheered, and Willoughby, observing that the situation was hopeless, gave the order to fire the powder magazine. On seeing the signal at about 4pm, Scully lit the train and within seconds hundreds of shells and powder barrels exploded, killing hundreds of attackers and denying them the munitions they sought.

== The aftermath ==
Shaw, Scully, Crow, Edwards and Stewart were all killed in the blast. But although expecting to be killed in the explosion, Willoughby, Raynor, Forrest and Buckley survived. Willoughby and Forrest escaped through the sally port facing the river and reached the main guard at the Kashmir Gate. Willoughby was killed the following day by the inhabitants of a village near the Hindon River whilst trying to join British forces at Meerut, but Forrest, though wounded, managed to reach Meerut after much hardship. Raynor escaped with the assistance of a native guide. Buckley, though severely wounded and almost black by gunpowder, was thrown clear of the walls by the blast and into the River Jumna. Near exhaustion, he collapsed on the far bank and was captured. On learning that his wife and three children had been slaughtered in the city, he broke down. He tried to provoke his captors to kill him, but the rebel leaders had been so impressed with the actions of the defenders of the Magazine that they refused. After some weeks he was able to escape and made a safe passage to British lines where he volunteered for increasingly dangerous missions.

A British relief force besieged the rebel held city from June and it fell to an assault in September.

== Recognition ==
=== Decorations ===
In 1858, the three survivors of the action, Raynor, Forrest and Buckley, were each awarded the Victoria Cross, the highest award for gallantry in the presence of the enemy. Raynor, at the age of 61, became the oldest ever recipient of the VC to the present day. The six who died were not awarded the VC as it was not awarded posthumously at the time, but Willoughby's widow, Susan Willoughby, was awarded a Civil List pension of £150 per annum for the rest of her life.

In 1907, a posthumous award of the Victoria Cross was made to six men who had fought in the Indian Rebellion of 1857 and the Second Boer War, but Willoughby was not among them. This may have been an oversight, or due to the fact that his mother had already received a generous pension, no other form of accolade then being available. One of the recipients in 1907 was Private Edward Spence, who "dauntlessly placed himself in an exposed position so as to cover the party carrying away the body". The body referred to was that of Willoughby's brother, Edward, killed on 15 April 1858. Spence died two days later from "the wound which he received on the occasion".

In 2012, efforts began by the family to present the case for a retrospective award of the Victoria Cross to Willoughby. It has so far been denied, three main reasons having been given: that it would be rewriting history; that there is no scope for retrospective action; and that the floodgates would be opened for similar claims.

=== Memorials and literature ===
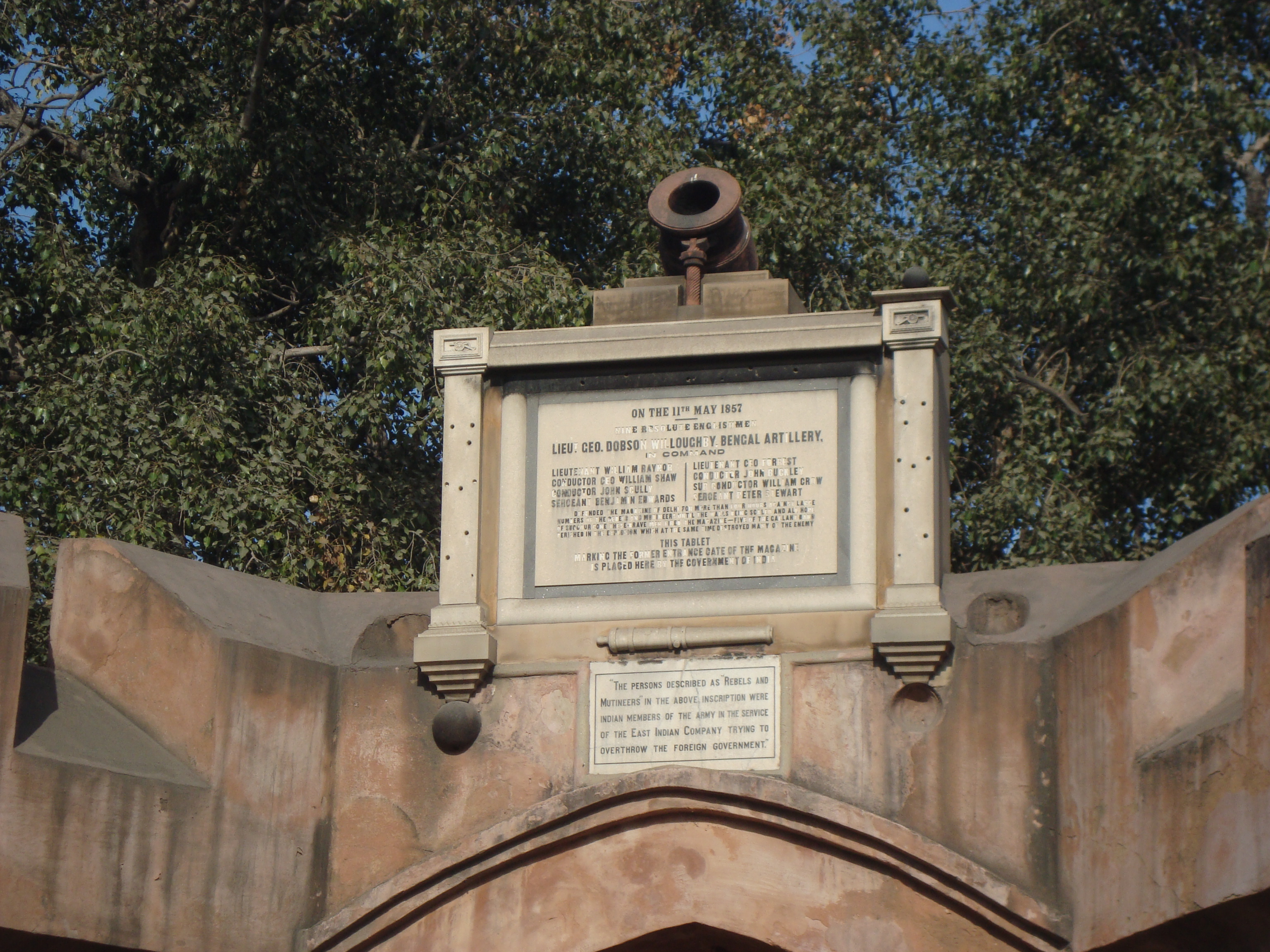
A memorial tablet affixed to one of the two remaining gates to the magazine

Several poems were written to commemorate the defenders, and the following official account of the action was published in the Calcutta Government Guide:

The Right Hon'ble the Governor-General in Council is pleased to direct the publication of the following authentic report of the occurrences at the Delhi Magazine on the 11th of May last when attacked by mutineers, and of the noble and cool soldiership of its gallant defenders, commanded by Lieutenant G. D. Willoughby, Commissary of Ordnance.

The Governor-General in Council desires to offer his cordial thanks to Lieutenants Raynor and Forrest and the other survivors among the brave men mentioned in this report, and to express the admiration with which he regards the daring and heroic conduct of Lieutenant G. D. Willoughby and the warrant and non-commissioned officers by whom he was supported on that occasion. Their names are Lieutenants Raynor and Forrest, Conductors Shaw, Buckley, and Scully, Sub-Conductor Crow, Sergeants Edwards and Stewart.

The family of the late Conductor Scully who so devotedly sacrificed himself in the explosion of the magazine, will be liberally provided for, should it be ascertained that they have survived him.

In 1888 a memorial tablet was erected by the Government of India on one of the two remaining gates of the Old Delhi Magazine:

On the 11th of May 1857 nine resolute Englishmen, Lieutenant Geo. Dobson Willoughby, Bengal Artillery, in command

Lieutenant William Rayner, Lieutenant Geo. Forrest, Conductor Geo. William Shaw, Conductor John Buckley, Conductor John Scully, Sub Conductor William Crow, Sergeant Benjamin Edward, Sergeant Peter Stewart

Defended the magazine of Delhi for more than four hours against large numbers of the rebels and mutineers until the walls being scaled and all hope of succour gone these brave men fired the magazine – five of the gallant band perished in the explosion which at the same time destroyed many of the enemy.

This tablet marking the former entrance gate of the magazine is placed here by the Government of India.

After Indian independence, a second tablet was installed below the 1888 tablet which read:

The persons described as ‘rebels and mutineers’ in the above inscription were Indian members of the army in the service of the East Indian Company trying to overthrow the foreign government.

Willoughby's relatives erected a memorial plaque to him at Bath Abbey. Forrest's son, George William Forrest, wrote a three-volume account of the mutiny which he dedicated to the memory of his father and mother and in which he compared the events at the Delhi Magazine to the Battle of Thermopylae. Hullavington Barracks in Wiltshire was renamed 'Buckley Barracks' in 1993 in honour of John Buckley.
