= Siege of Delhi (1857) =

Conflict of the Indian Rebellion

- Part of the Indian Rebellion of 1857
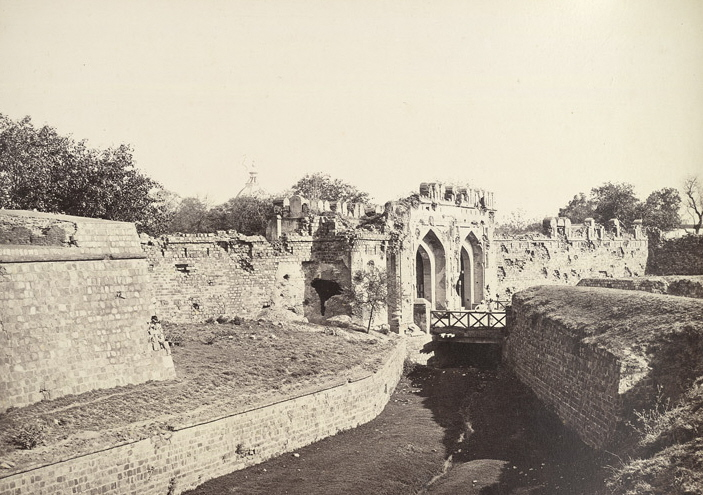
- Battle damage to the Kashmiri Gate in Delhi, 1857
Date	8 June – 21 September 1857 (3 months, 1 week and 6 days)
Location	Delhi, Mughal Empire
Result	British victory

Belligerents
British Empire; East India Company	Mughal Empire; Sepoy mutineers

Commanders and leaders
(British Empire) George Anson; (British Empire) Sir Henry William Barnard (British Empire) Archdale Wilson; John Nicholson †; William Hodson; (British Empire) James Hope Grant	Bahadur Shah II (surrendered); Mirza Mughal (executed); Mirza Khizr Sultan (executed); Bakht Khan

Strength
3,000 regular 6000 Punjabis, Sikhs, and Gurkhas; 2,200 Kashmiri irregulars 42 field guns 60 siege guns	12,000 sepoys, approx. 30,000 irregulars or mujahideen, approx. 100 guns

Casualties and losses
1,254 killed 4,493 wounded	Approx. 5,000 killed and wounded 30000+ civilians killed

The siege of Delhi was a decisive conflict of the Indian Rebellion of 1857. The rebellion against the authority of the East India Company was widespread through much of Northern India, but was essentially sparked by the mass uprising by the sepoys of the Bengal Army, which the company had itself raised in its Bengal Presidency (which actually covered a vast area from Assam to the borders of Delhi). Seeking a symbol around which to rally, the first sepoys to rebel sought to reinstate the power of the Mughal Empire, which had ruled much of the Indian subcontinent in the previous centuries. Lacking overall direction, many who subsequently rebelled also flocked to Delhi.

This made the siege decisive for two reasons. Firstly, large numbers of rebels were committed to the defence of a single fixed point, perhaps to the detriment of their prospects elsewhere, and their defeat at Delhi was thus a very major military setback. Secondly, the British recapture of Delhi and the refusal of the aged Mughal Emperor Bahadur Shah II to continue the struggle deprived the rebellion of much of its national character. Although the rebels still held large areas, there was little co-ordination between them, and the British were able to overcome them separately.

== Outbreak of the rebellion ==
After several years of increasing tension among the sepoys (Indian soldiers) of the British East India Company's Bengal Army, the sepoys at Meerut, 43 miles (69 km) northeast of Delhi, openly rebelled against their British officers. The flashpoint was the introduction of the Pattern 1853 Enfield rifle. The cartridges for this were widely believed to be greased with a mixture of cow and pig fat, and to bite them open when loading the rifle (as required by the drill books) would defile both Hindu and Muslim soldiers.

Eighty-five men of the 3rd Bengal Cavalry stationed at Meerut refused to accept their cartridges. They were hastily court martialled, and on 9 May 1857 they were sentenced to long periods of imprisonment and were paraded in irons before the British and Bengal regiments in the garrison. On the evening of the following day, soldiers of the Bengal regiments (3rd Light Cavalry, 11th and 20th Infantry) rebelled, releasing the imprisoned troopers and killing their British officers and many British civilians in their cantonment.

The senior Company officers at Meerut were taken by surprise. Although they had ample warning of disaffection among the Bengal Army after earlier outbreaks of unrest at Berhampur, Barrackpur and Ambala, they had assumed that at Meerut, where the proportion of European to Indian troops was higher than anywhere else in India, the Bengal units would not risk open revolt. They were fortunate that they did not suffer disaster. The Bengal regiments broke into rebellion on Sunday, when European troops customarily attended evening church parade without arms. Due to the increasingly hot summer weather, the church services on 10 May took place half an hour later than on previous weeks, and when the outbreak occurred, the British troops had not yet left their barracks and could quickly be mustered and armed.

Other than defending their own barracks and armouries, the company's commanders at Meerut took little action, not even notifying nearby garrisons or stations. (The telegraph had been cut, but dispatch riders could easily have reached Delhi before the sepoys, had they been sent immediately.) When they had rallied the British troops in the cantonment and prepared to disperse the sepoys on 11 May, they found that Meerut was quiet and the sepoys had marched off to Delhi.

=== Capture of Delhi by the rebels ===
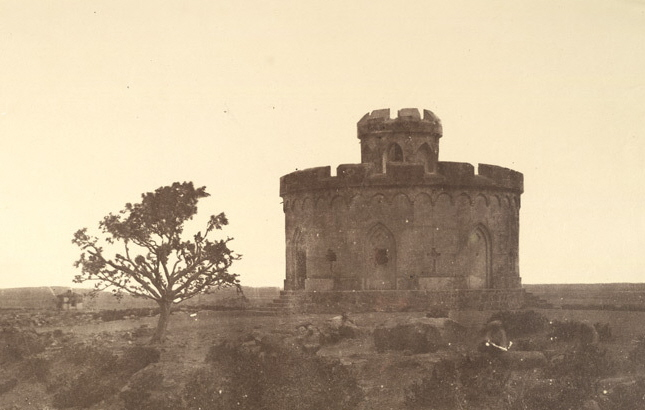
The Flagstaff Tower, Delhi, where the British survivors of the rebellion gathered on 11 May 1857

Delhi was the capital of the Mughal Empire, which had been reduced to insignificance over the preceding century. The emperor, Bahadur Shah II, who was 82, had been informed by the East India Company that the title would die with him. At the time, Delhi was not a major centre of Company administration, although Company officials controlled the city's finances and courts. They and their families lived in the "Civil Lines" to the north of the city.

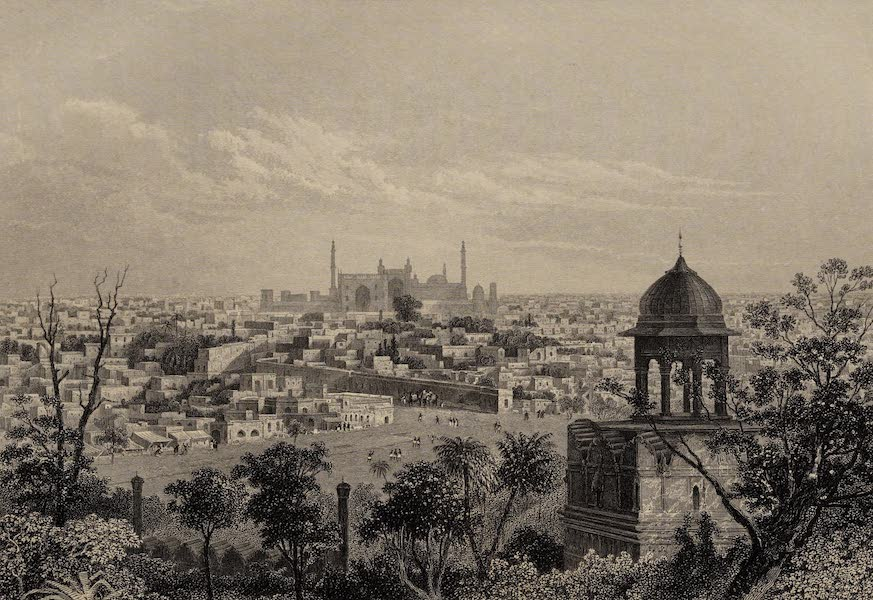
View of Delhi, from the Palace Gate, 1858

There were no units of the British Army or "European" units of the East India Company forces at Delhi. Three Bengal Native Infantry regiments (the 38th, 54th and 74th) were stationed in barracks 2 miles (3.2 km) north-west of the city. They provided guards, working parties and other details to a "Main Guard" building just inside the walls near the Kashmiri Gate on the northern circuit of walls, the arsenal in the city and other buildings. By coincidence, when the regiments paraded early in the morning of 11 May, their officers read out to them the general order announcing the execution of sepoy Mangal Pandey, who had attempted to start a rebellion near Barrackpore earlier in the year, and the disbandment of his regiment, the 34th Bengal Native Infantry. This produced much muttering in the ranks.

Later in the morning, the rebels from Meerut arrived quite unexpectedly, crossing the bridge of boats over the Jumna River. The leading sowars (troopers) of the 3rd Light Cavalry halted under the windows of the Palace and called on the Emperor to lead them. Bahadur Shah called for them to go to another palace outside the city, where their case would be heard later. Company officials then tried to close all the city gates, but were too late to prevent the sowars gaining entry through the Rajghat Gate to the south. Once inside, the sowars were quickly joined by mobs which began attacking Company officials and looting bazaars.

Some Company officers and civilians tried to take refuge in the Main Guard, but the sepoys there joined the revolt, and they were slaughtered. Other officers arrived from the barracks, accompanied by two field guns and several companies of sepoys who had not yet joined the rebellion, and recaptured the Main Guard, sending the bodies of the dead officers to the cantonments in a cart. In the city meanwhile nine British officers from the Ordnance Corps, led by George Willoughby were conducting the Defence of the Magazine, which contained artillery, stocks of firearms and ammunition. They found that their troops and labourers were deserting, using ladders provided from the palace to climb over the walls. The officers opened fire on their own troops and the mobs to prevent the arsenal falling intact into the rebels' hands. After five hours, they had run out of ammunition and blew up their magazine, killing many rioters and onlookers, and badly damaging nearby buildings. Only three of them escaped and received the Victoria Cross: John Buckley, George Forrest and William Raynor.

Shortly after this, the troops at the Main Guard were ordered to withdraw. The sepoys there, who had hitherto remained aloof from the revolt, turned on their officers, a few of whom escaped after the sepoys left to join the looting.

About half the European civilians in Delhi and in the cantonments and Civil Lines were able to flee, first to the Flagstaff Tower on the ridge to the north-west of Delhi where telegraph operators were trying to warn other British stations of the uprising. After it became clear that no help could arrive from Meerut or elsewhere, and the cart carrying the bodies of the officers killed at the Main Guard in the morning arrived at the tower by mistake, most of the Europeans fled to Karnal, several miles west. Some were helped by villagers on the way, others fell prey to plunderers.

=== Mughal restoration ===
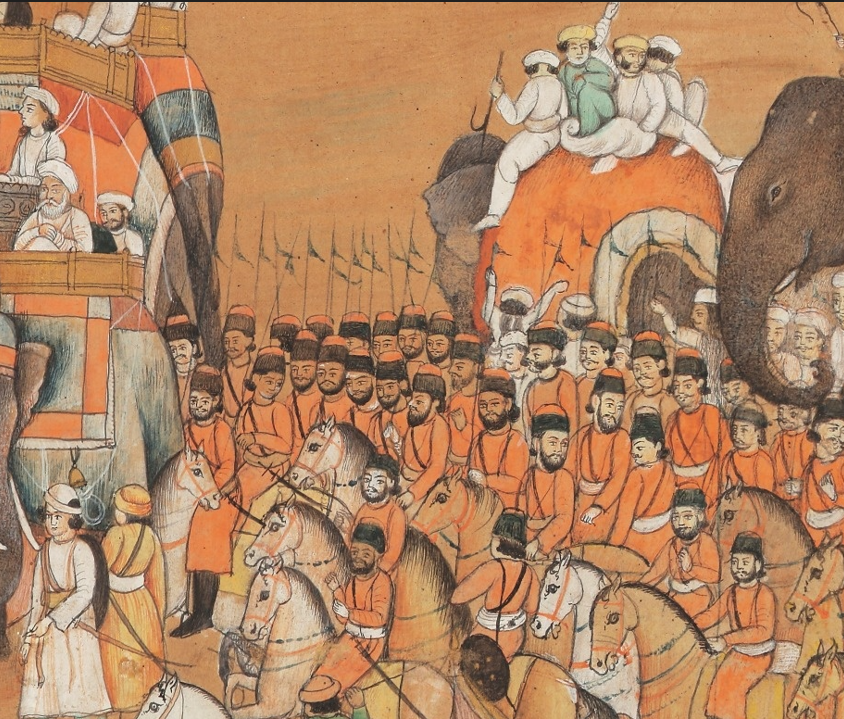
Cavalry in the Procession of the Mughal king under the British Resident

On 12 May, Bahadur Shah held his first formal audience in several years. It was attended by several excited sepoys who treated him familiarly or even disrespectfully. Although Bahadur Shah was dismayed by the looting and disorder, he gave his public support to the rebellion. On 16 May, sepoys and palace servants killed 52 British who had been held prisoner within the palace or who had been discovered hiding in the city. The killings took place under a peepul tree in front of the palace, despite Bahadur Shah's protests. The avowed aim of the killers was to implicate Bahadur Shah in the killings, making it impossible for him to seek any compromise with the company.

The administration of the city and its new occupying army was chaotic, although it continued to function haphazardly. The Emperor nominated his eldest surviving son, Mirza Mughal, to be commander-in-chief of his forces, but Mirza Mughal had little military experience and was treated with little respect by the sepoys. Nor did the sepoys agree on any overall commander, with each regiment refusing to accept orders from any but their own officers. Although Mirza Mughal made efforts to put the civil administration in order, his writ extended no further than the city. Outside, Gujjar herders began levying their own tolls on traffic, and it became increasingly difficult to feed the city.

News of the rebellion at Meerut and the capture of Delhi spread rapidly throughout India. Rumours and envoys from the rebels spread the tidings fast and precipitated widespread rebellions and uprisings, but the Company learned of the events at Delhi even more quickly, thanks to the telegraph. Where the commanders of stations were energetic and distrustful of their sepoys, they were able to forestall some of the most dangerous revolts.

== Company moves ==
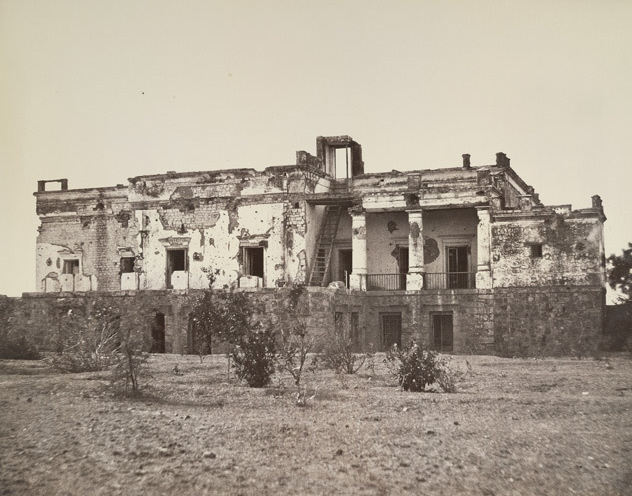
Hindu Rao's house in Delhi, now a hospital, was extensively damaged in the fighting.

Although there were several Company units available in the cool "hill stations" in the foothills of the Himalayas, it took time before any action could be taken to recapture Delhi. This was partly due to lack of transport and supplies. After the end of the Second Anglo-Sikh War, the Bengal Army's transport units had been disbanded as an economy measure, and transport had to be improvised from scratch. Also, many of the senior British officers were widely regarded as dotards, far too senile to act decisively or sensibly.

Nevertheless, a Company force under General George Anson, the commander-in-chief in India, was able to move from Ambala to Karnal starting on 17 May. On 7 June, they were joined at Alipur by a force from Meerut, which had fought several skirmishes en route. The Meerut force was led by Brigadier Archdale Wilson, who had conspicuously failed to prevent the rebel sepoys' move to Delhi on 11 May. Anson died of cholera at Karnal on 27 May. Under his successor, Major General Henry Barnard, the combined force advanced on Delhi.

On 8 June, they found the mutineers had entrenched themselves outside the city. They drove the large but disorganised rebel force from the field at the Battle of Badli-ki-Serai 6 miles (9.7 km) west of Delhi, and captured Delhi ridge 2 miles (3.2 km) north of the city and the Bengal infantry barracks to the west of it. As a gesture of defiance and contempt, they set fire to the barracks. This was a senseless act, as it condemned the besiegers (and all their sick and wounded and noncombatants) to live in tents through the hot weather and monsoon rain seasons.

The ridge was of hard rock, about 60 feet (18 m) high, and ran from a point only 1,200 yards (1,100 m) east of the Kabul Gate on the city walls to the Yamuna River 3 miles (4.8 km) north of the city. Fortunately for the besiegers, a canal ran from the Yamuna west of their encampments, protecting the rear of their camp and also providing drinking water. The besiegers occupied various fortified posts along the top of the ridge. The nearest to the city and the most exposed was known as "Hindu Rao's house", defended by the 60th Rifles and Gurkhas of the 8th (Sirmoor) Local Battalion. South of it was a maze of villages and walled gardens, called the Subzi Mundi, in which the rebel forces could gather before launching attacks on the British right.

=== The siege: June through July ===
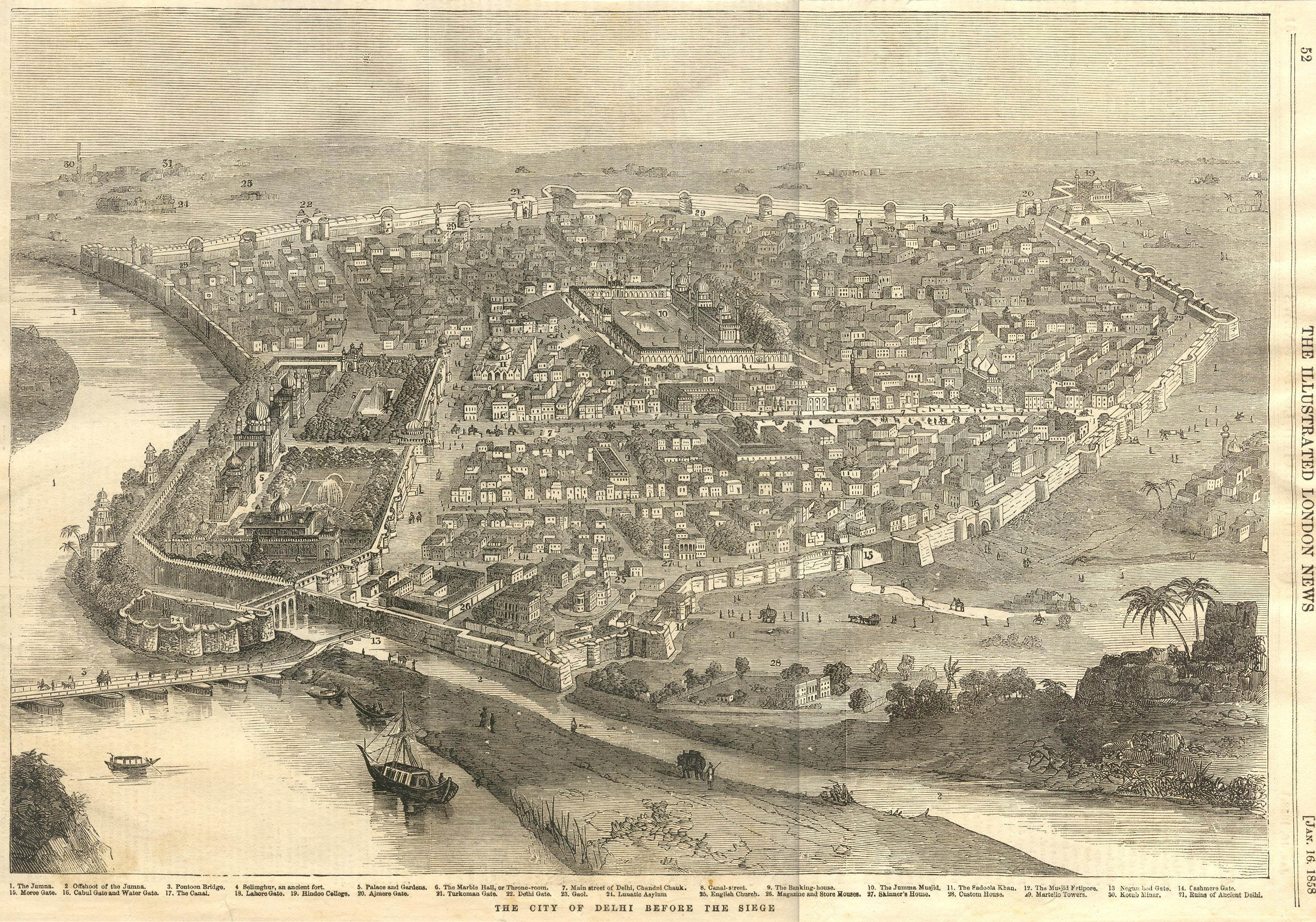
The City of Delhi Before the Siege – The Illustrated London News 16 Jan 1858

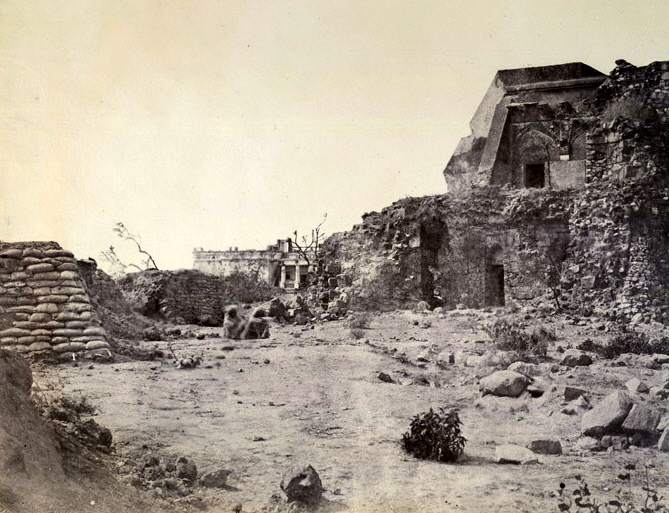
The Jantar Mantar observatory in Delhi in 1858, damaged in the fighting.

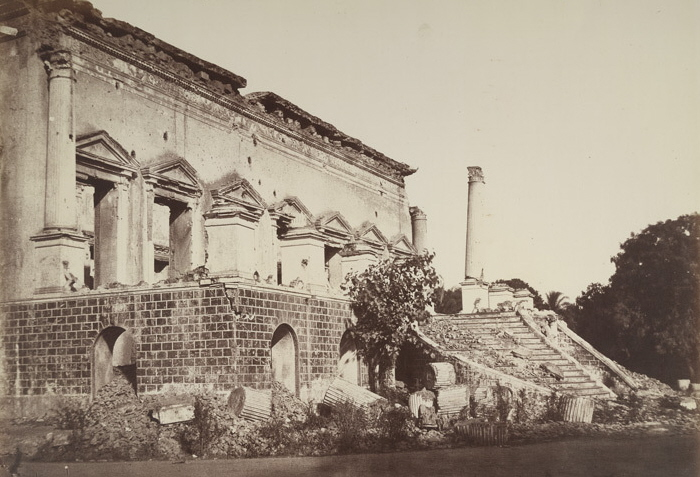
Bank of Delhi was attacked by mortar and gunfire.

It was quickly apparent that Delhi was too well-fortified and strongly held to fall to a coup de main. Barnard ordered a dawn assault on 13 June, but the orders were confused and failed to reach most of his subordinates in time. The attack had to be called off, amidst much recrimination. After this, it was accepted that the odds were too great for any assault to be successful until the besiegers were reinforced.

Large contingents of rebellious sepoys and volunteers continued to arrive in Delhi. The majority of no less than ten regiments of cavalry and fifteen of infantry of the Bengal Army rebelled and made their way to Delhi during June and July, along with large numbers of irregulars, mainly Muslim mujahaddin. As each new contingent arrived, the rebels made attacks on Hindu Rao's house and other outposts on several successive days. A major attack was mounted from three directions on 19 June, and nearly forced the exhausted besiegers to retreat, but the rebels did not know how close they came to success. Another major attack was made on 23 June, the centenary of the Battle of Plassey. (It was believed that the presence of East India Company in India would end one hundred years after this famous battle).So was the attack on the British Cavalry Lines on the night of 3 July beaten.

Although all these attacks were beaten off, the besiegers were ground down through exhaustion and disease. Conditions on the ridge and in the encampment were extremely unhealthy and unpleasant. General Barnard died of cholera on 5 July. His successor, Reed, was also stricken with cholera and forced to hand over command to Archdale Wilson, who was promoted to major general. Although Wilson made efforts to clear the unburied corpses and other refuse from the ridge and encampment and reorganise the outposts and reliefs, he himself was scarcely capable of exercising command, and in every letter he wrote, he complained of his exhaustion and prostration. Brigadier Neville Bowles Chamberlain, a much younger officer who might have provided better leadership, was severely wounded repelling a sortie on 14 July.

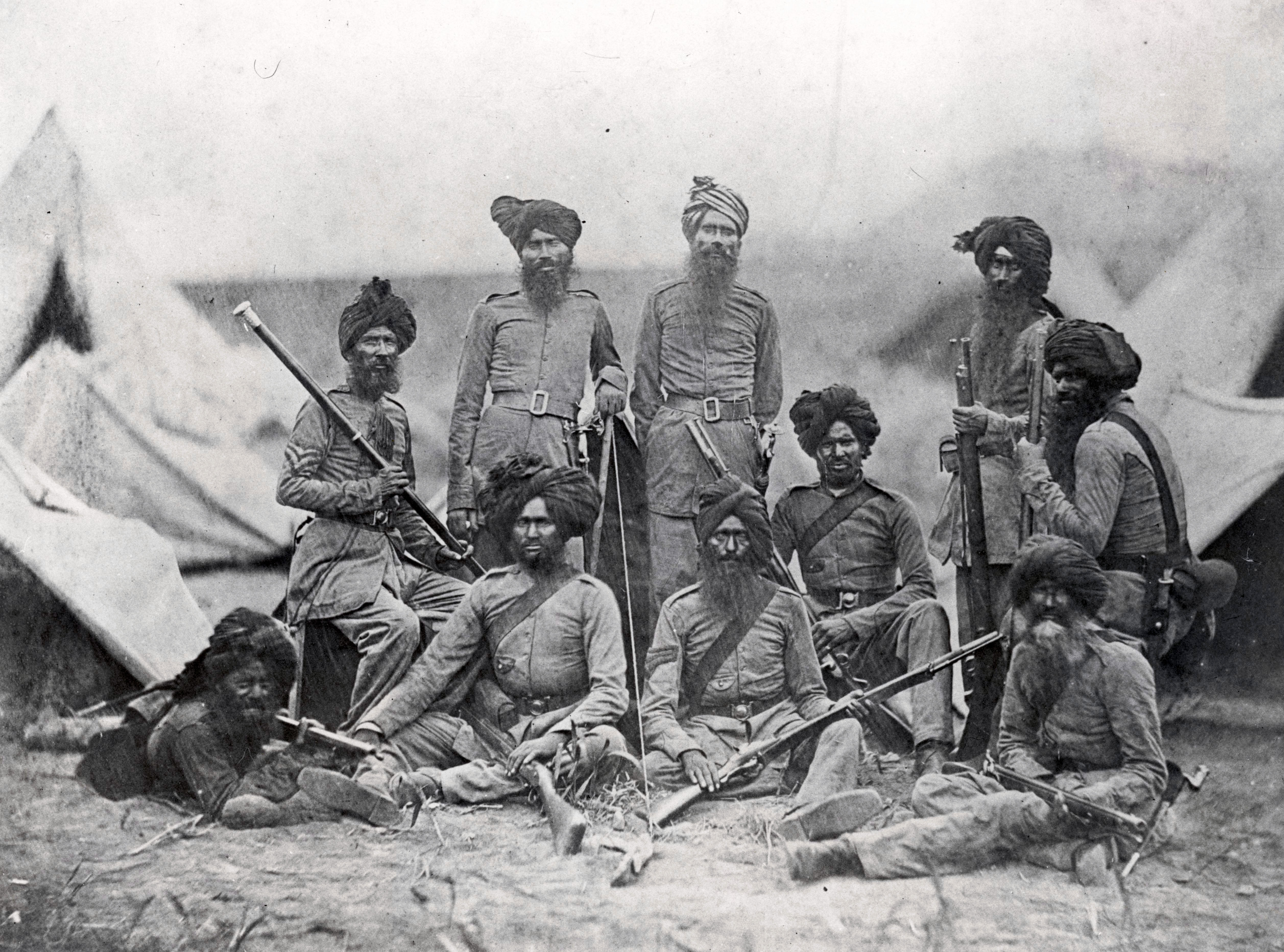
Sikh officers of the British army by Felice Beato, 1858

Meanwhile, in Delhi, there had been some loss of morale due to the failures of Mirza Moghul and Bahadur Shah's equally unmilitary grandson, Mirza Abu Bakr. A large party of reinforcements arrived from Bareilly under Bakht Khan, a veteran artillery officer of the company's army. (In the British Indian artillery, North Indian Muslims were generaIIy preferred and had been the majority of the establishment.) Pleased with the loot they brought with them, Bahadur Shah made Bakht Khan the new commander-in-chief. Bakht Khan was able to replenish the city's finances and inspire the rebel soldiers to renewed efforts. Bahadur Shah however, was growing discouraged, and turned away offers of assistance from other rebel leaders.

=== The siege: August to September ===
In one vital area of India, the Punjab, which had been annexed by the East India Company only eight years before, the Bengal Native units were quickly disarmed to prevent them rebelling or were defeated when they did rebel. Most of the available Company units were stationed there, along with units of the Punjab Irregular Force, which were formed from Sikhs and Pakhtuns who had little in common with the high caste Hindus of the Bengal Native Infantry.

As the situation in the Punjab stabilised, units could be dispatched to reinforce the besiegers at Delhi. Also, the rulers of the states of Patiala, Jhind and Nabha were induced to support the East India Company, sending contingents of their armies to secure the lines of communication between the besiegers and the Punjab.

The first reinforcements to arrive at Delhi, the Corps of Guides, made an epic forced march of several hundred miles through the hottest season of the year, which also coincided with the month of Ramadan, during which their Muslim soldiers could neither eat nor drink during the day. They nevertheless went into action almost immediately when they arrived at the ridge.

The major forces dispatched from the Punjab to Delhi were a "Flying Column" of 4,200 men under Brigadier John Nicholson and a siege train. Nicholson himself arrived on 14 August. The rebels had heard of the imminent arrival of the siege train and sent a force out of the city to intercept it. On 25 August, Nicholson led a force against their position at the Battle of Najafgarh. Although the monsoon had broken and the roads and fields were flooded, Nicholson drove his force to make a rapid march and gained an easy victory, raising European morale and lowering that of the rebels.

The siege train arrived at the beginning of September, comprising six 24-pounders, eight 18-pounder long guns, six 8 inch howitzers and four 10 inch mortars, with almost 600 ammunition carts. On 8 September a further four guns arrived. With the guns already present, the besiegers had a total of 15 24-pounder guns, 20 18-pounder guns and 25 mortars and howitzers.

== The capture of Delhi ==
=== The bombardment ===
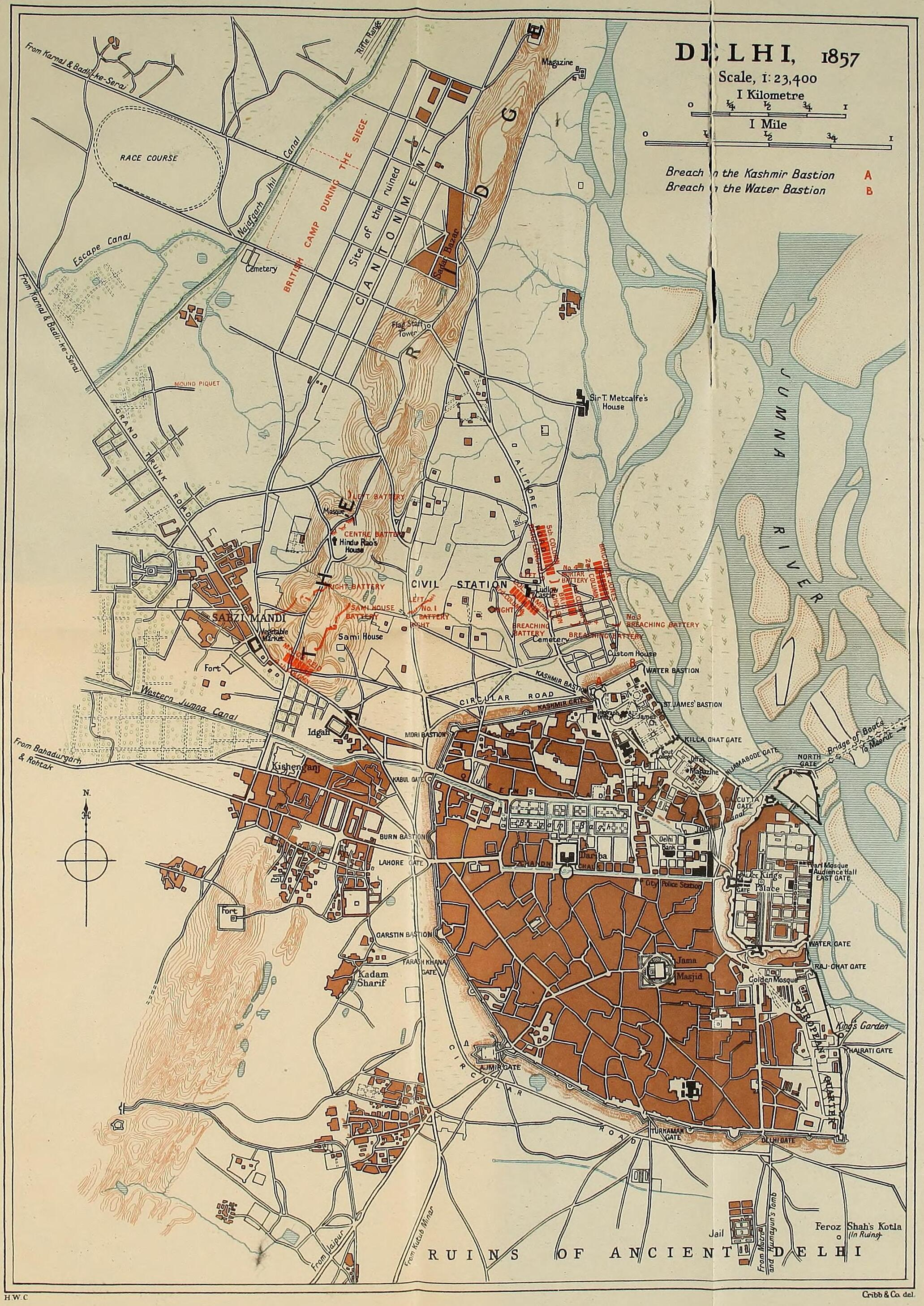
The outline of the siege with the British camp (cantonment) just north of the city

By early September, the British had assembled a force of some 9,000, which consisted of 3,000 "European" troops (from both the British or "Queen's" army and the East India Company's army) and 6,000 Sikhs, Punjabis, and Gurkhas.

Wilson's chief Engineer Officer, Richard Baird Smith, had drawn up a plan to breach the city walls and make an assault. Wilson was unwilling to risk any attack, but was urged by Nicholson to agree to Baird Smith's plan. There were moves among the British officers, in which Nicholson was prominent, to replace Wilson as commander if he failed to agree to make the attack.

As a preliminary step, on 6 September the Company forces constructed "Reid's Battery", or the "Sammy House Battery", of two 24-pounder and four 9-pounder guns, near the southern end of the ridge, to silence the guns on the Mori Bastion. Under cover of Reid's Battery, on 7 September the first siege battery proper was established, 700 yards (640 m) from the Mori Bastion. Opening fire on 8 September, four of its guns engaged the artillery on the Kashmir Bastion, while six guns and a heavy mortar silenced the rebels' guns on the Mori Bastion after a long duel. The direction of this attack also deceived the rebels into believing that the storming attempt would be made from the east, rather than the north.

A second battery, consisting of nine 24-pounder guns, two 18-pounder guns and seven 8-inch howitzers, was set up near a flamboyantly designed house known as "Ludlow Castle" in the Civil Lines, and opened fire against the Kashmir Bastion on 10 September. A third battery of six 18-pounder guns and 12 Coehorn mortars was set up near the old Custom House less than 200 yards (180 m) from the city walls, and opened fire against the Water Bastion near the Yamuna next day. A fourth battery of ten heavy mortars was set up in cover near the Khudsia Bagh, opening fire on 11 September. Because the element of surprise had been lost and these batteries were being enfiladed from across the river, the Indian sappers and pioneers who carried out much of the work of constructing the second and third batteries and moving the guns into position suffered over 300 casualties, but the batteries quickly made breaches in the bastions and walls. Fifty guns continued to fire day and night, and the walls began to crumble away.

The opening of this phase of the siege seems to have coincided with the exhaustion of the ammunition the rebels had captured from the magazine, as the rebel fire became suddenly much less effective. By this time also, the rebels had become depressed through lack of supplies and money and by defeatist rumours which were spread by agents and spies organised by William Hodson.

=== Preparation for the assault ===
The attack was scheduled for 3 a.m. on 14 September. The storming columns moved into position during the night of 13 September. The future Field Marshal Lord Roberts, then a junior staff officer, recorded their composition:

1st Column – Brigadier General Nicholson

75th Foot – 300
1st Bengal Fusiliers – 250
2nd Punjab Infantry (Greene's Rifles) – 450
Total – 1000

2nd Column – Brigadier Jones

8th Foot – 250
2nd Bengal Fusiliers – 250
4th Sikhs – 350
Total – 850

3rd Column – Colonel Campbell

52nd Foot – 200
Kumaon Battalion (Gurkhas) – 250
1st Punjab Infantry (Coke's Rifles) – 500
Total – 950

4th Column – Major Reid

Sirmur Battalion (Gurkhas)
Guides Infantry
Collected picquets
Total – 850
Plus Kashmir contingent in reserve – 1000

5th Column – Brigadier Longfield

61st Foot – 250
4th Punjab Infantry (Wilde's Rifles) – 450
Baluch Battalion (one "wing" only) – 300
Total – 1000

Detachments of the 60th Rifles, totalling 200, preceded all the columns, as skirmishers. Engineers and sappers were attached to lead each column.

There was also a cavalry brigade in reserve under James Hope Grant, which probably consisted of:

6th Carbineers (one "wing" only)
9th Lancers
Guides Cavalry
1st Punjab Cavalry (one squadron)
2nd Punjab Cavalry (one squadron)
5th Punjab Cavalry (one squadron)
Hodson's Horse (irregular levies)

=== The assault ===
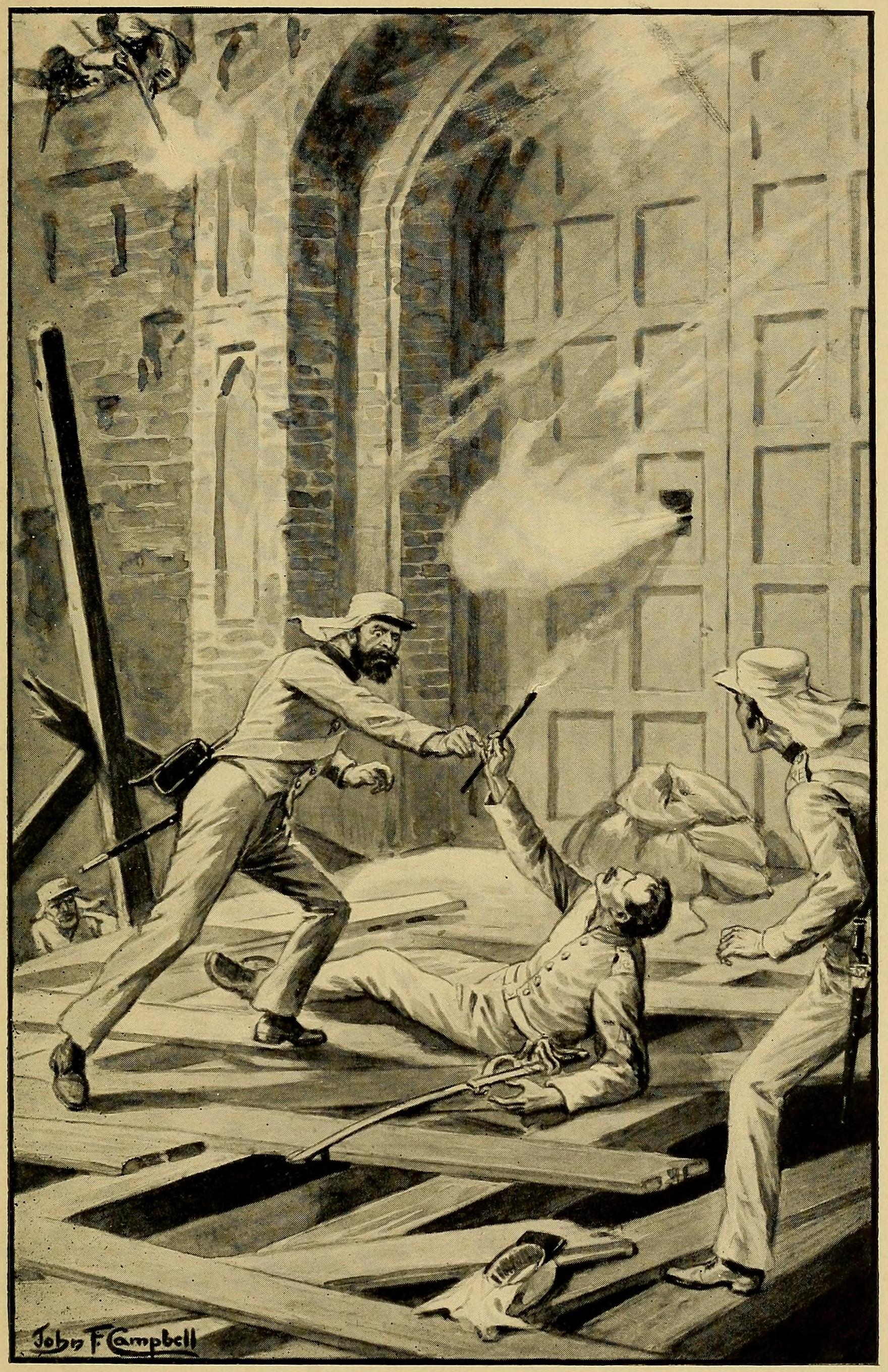
Blowing of Kashmir gate by Sergeant Carmichael

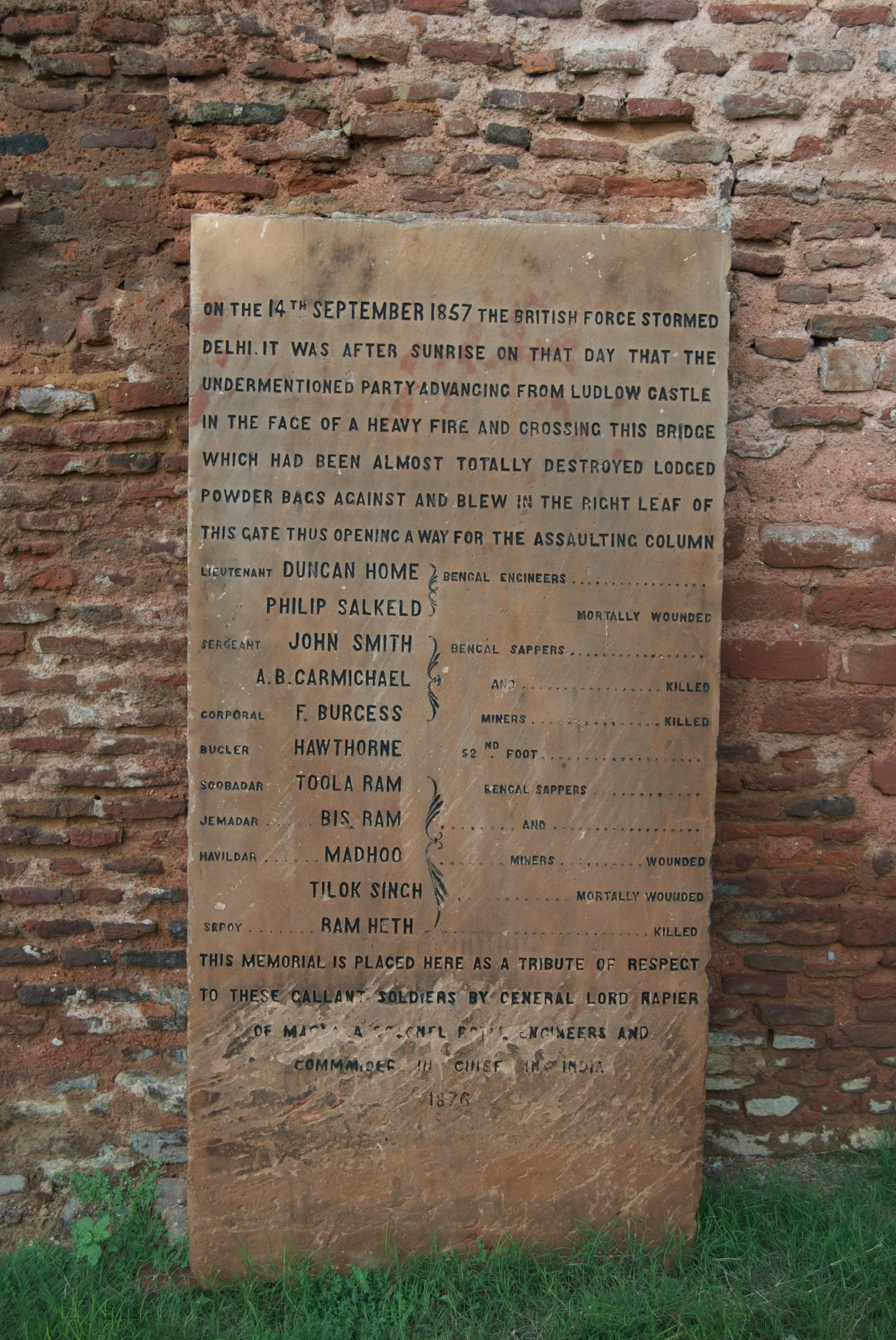
Plaque at Kashmiri Gate, commemorating the attack on it on 14 September 1857

The first three columns, under Nicholson's overall command, gathered in and behind a building known as the Khudsia Bagh, a former summer residence of the Mughal Kings, about a quarter of a mile from the north walls. The fourth column was intended to attack only when the Kabul Gate on the west of the city walls was opened from behind by the other columns. The fifth column and the cavalry were in reserve.

The attack was supposed to be launched at dawn, but the defenders had repaired some of the breaches overnight with sandbags, and further bombardment was required. Eventually, Nicholson gave the signal and the attackers charged. The first column stormed through the breach in the Kashmir Bastion and the second through that in the Water Bastion by the Jumna River, but this was not without difficulty, as most of the scaling ladders were broken before they could be emplaced.

The third column attacked the Kashmiri Gate on the north wall. Two sapper officers, Lieutenants Home and Salkeld (both of whom subsequently won the Victoria Cross), led a suicidal mission, a small party of British and Indian sappers which placed four gunpowder charges and sandbags against the gate under fire from just 10 feet (3.0 m) away. Several of them were wounded or killed trying to light the fuse. The explosion demolished part of the gate. Bugler Robert Hawthorne, 52nd Foot, who had accompanied the party, bravely signalled success and the third column charged in with a cheer.. Hawthorne was subsequently awarded the VC for his gallantry.

Meanwhile, the fourth column encountered a rebel force in the suburb of Kishangunj outside the Kabul Gate before the other columns attacked, and was thrown into disorder. Major Reid, its commander, was seriously injured, and the column retired. The rebels followed up, capturing four guns from the Kashmiri troops, and threatened to attack the British camp, which had been emptied of its guards to form the assault force. The artillery batteries at Hindu Rao's House (directed by Chamberlain from a doolie) stopped them until Hope Grant's cavalry and horse artillery could move up to replace Reid's column. The cavalry remained in position under fire from guns on the Kabul Gate and suffered heavy casualties, until relieved by infantry.

In spite of this reverse, Nicholson was keen to press on into the city. He led a detachment down a narrow lane to try to capture the Burn Bastion, on the walls north of the Kabul Gate. Rebel soldiers held most of the flat rooftops and walled compounds, and guns mounted on the bastion fired grapeshot down the lanes between the houses. After two rushes were stopped with heavy casualties, Nicholson led a third charge and was mortally wounded.

Temporarily repulsed, the British now withdrew to the Church of Saint James, just inside the walls of the Kashmir Bastion. They had suffered 1,170 casualties in the attack. Archdale Wilson moved to the Church, and faced with the setback, he wished to order a withdrawal. When he heard of Wilson's indecision, the dying Nicholson threatened to shoot him. Eventually, Baird Smith, Chamberlain and other officers persuaded Wilson to hold on to the British gains.

=== The capture of the city ===
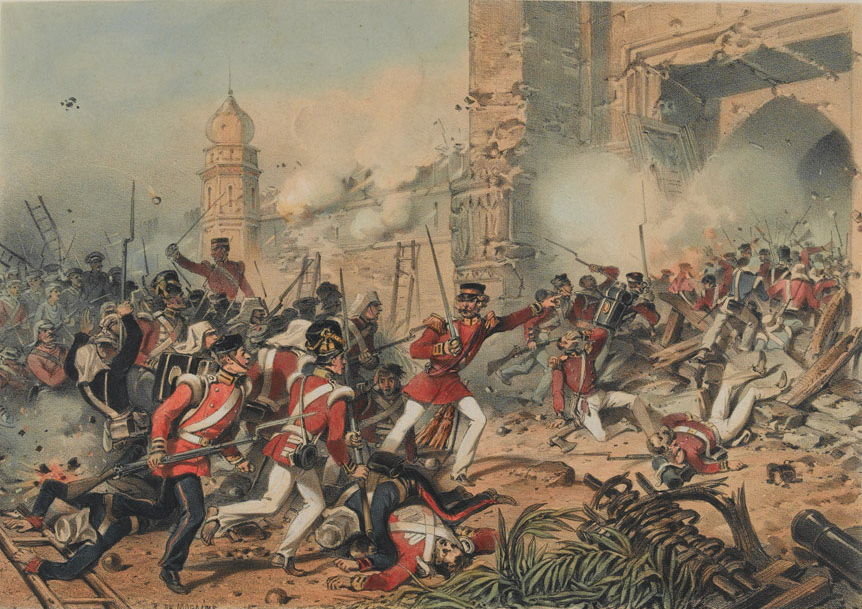
Capture of Delhi, 1857

The British and Company forces were disordered. Many British officers had been killed or wounded, and their units were now in confusion. The British foothold included many of the liquor stores and over the next two days, many British soldiers became drunk and incapacitated on looted spirits. However, the rebel sepoy regiments had become discouraged by their defeats and lack of food, while the irregular mujahhadin defended their fortified compounds with great determination, but could not be organised to make a coordinated counter-attack.

Wilson eventually ordered all liquor to be destroyed, and discipline was restored. Slowly, the attackers began to clear the rebels from the city. They captured the magazine on 16 September. Another Victoria Cross was earned here, by Lieutenant Thackerey for extinguishing a fire in the magazine whilst under musket fire. Bahadur Shah and his entourage abandoned the palace on 18 September, and a British force captured the great mosque, the Jama Masjid, and the abandoned palace the next day. They also captured the Selimgarh Fort, attached to the palace and dominating the bridge of boats over the River Yamuna. Most rebels who had not already left the city now did so before the Company forces captured all the gates and trapped them.

The city was finally declared to be captured on 21 September. John Nicholson died the next day.

== Aftermath ==
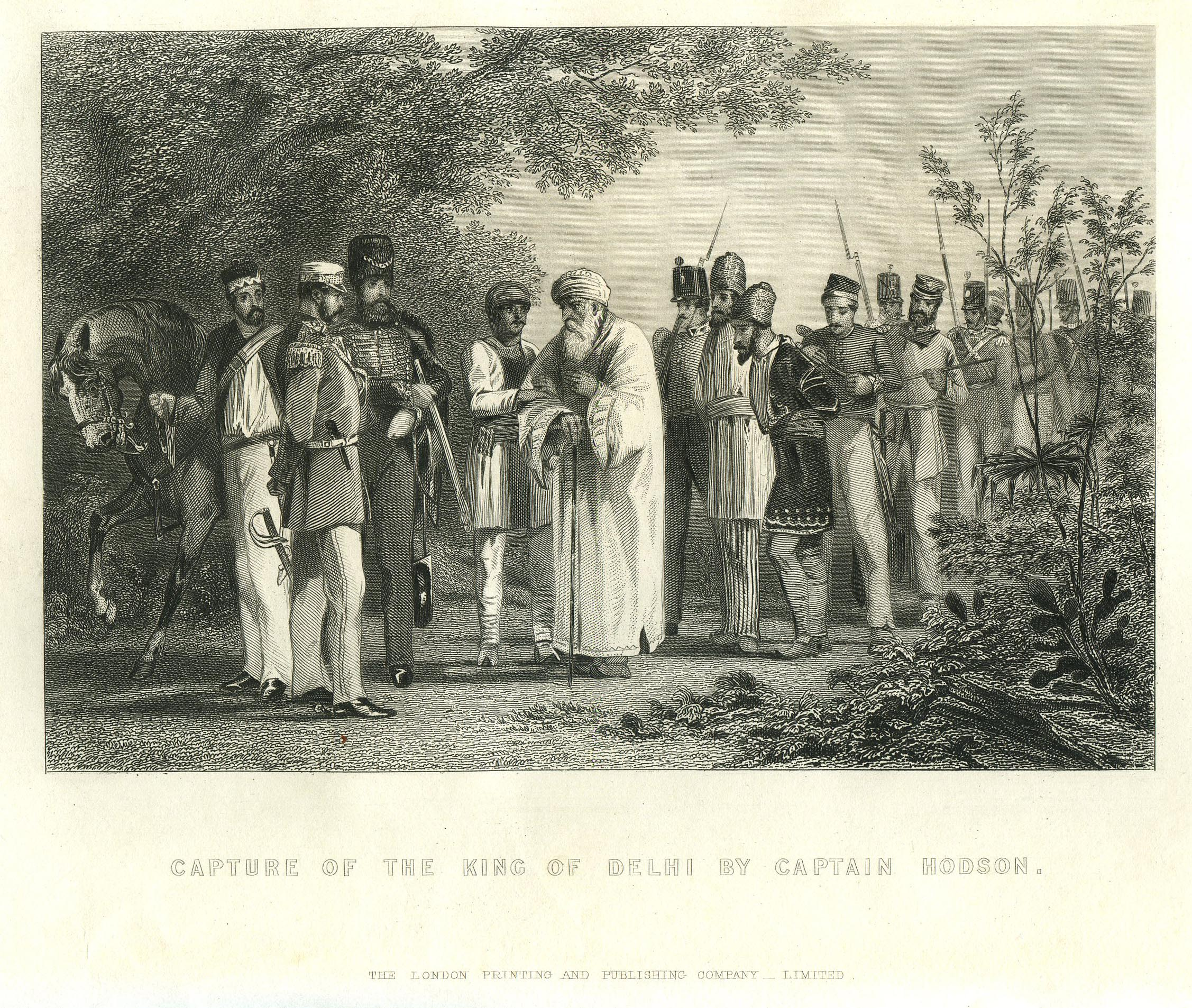
Capture of Bahadur Shah Zafar and his sons by William Hodson at Humayun's tomb on 20 September 1857

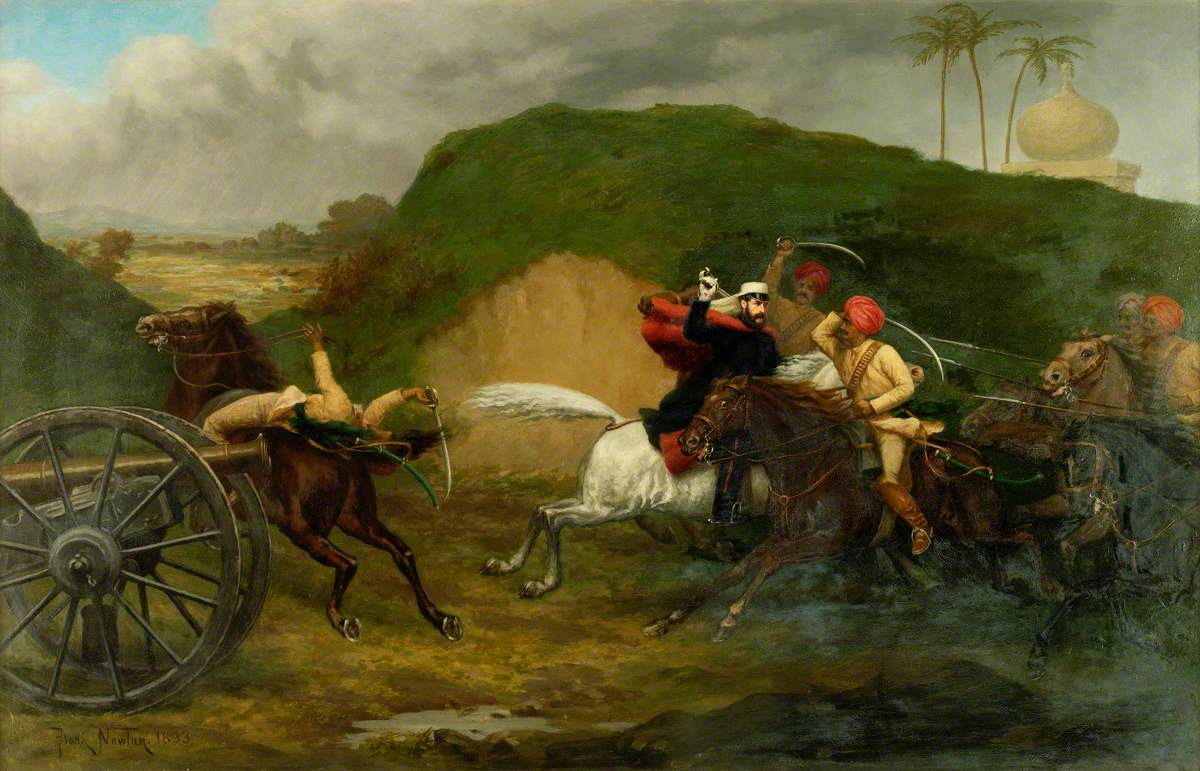
Two British soldiers, James Hills-Johnes (pictured) and Henry Tombs were awarded the Victoria Cross for their part in the battle

The cost to the British, Company, and loyal Indian armies in besieging Delhi from the start of the siege to the capture of the city was 1,254 killed, and 4,493 wounded, of which 992 were killed, 2,795 were wounded and 30 missing in action during the last six days of brutal fighting in the city during the final assault. Of that total of 3,817 casualties during the capture of the city, 1,677 were loyalist Indian soldiers. It is almost impossible to say how many rebels and their supporters were killed during the siege, but the number was far greater. Unofficial sources place the rebel casualties at over 5,000.

It is also impossible to estimate how many civilians died during the fighting in Delhi, which included those killed by the rebels, the British, or in the cross-fire. After the siege, many civilians were subsequently expelled from the city to makeshift camps in the nearby countryside, as there was no way of feeding them until order was restored to the entire area. The British, Sikh and Pakhtun soldiers were all fairly callous with regard to life. For four days, after the fall of the city, there was extensive looting, although many British soldiers were more interested in drink than material possessions. Prize agents later moved into the city behind the troops, and organised the search for concealed treasure on a more systematic basis.

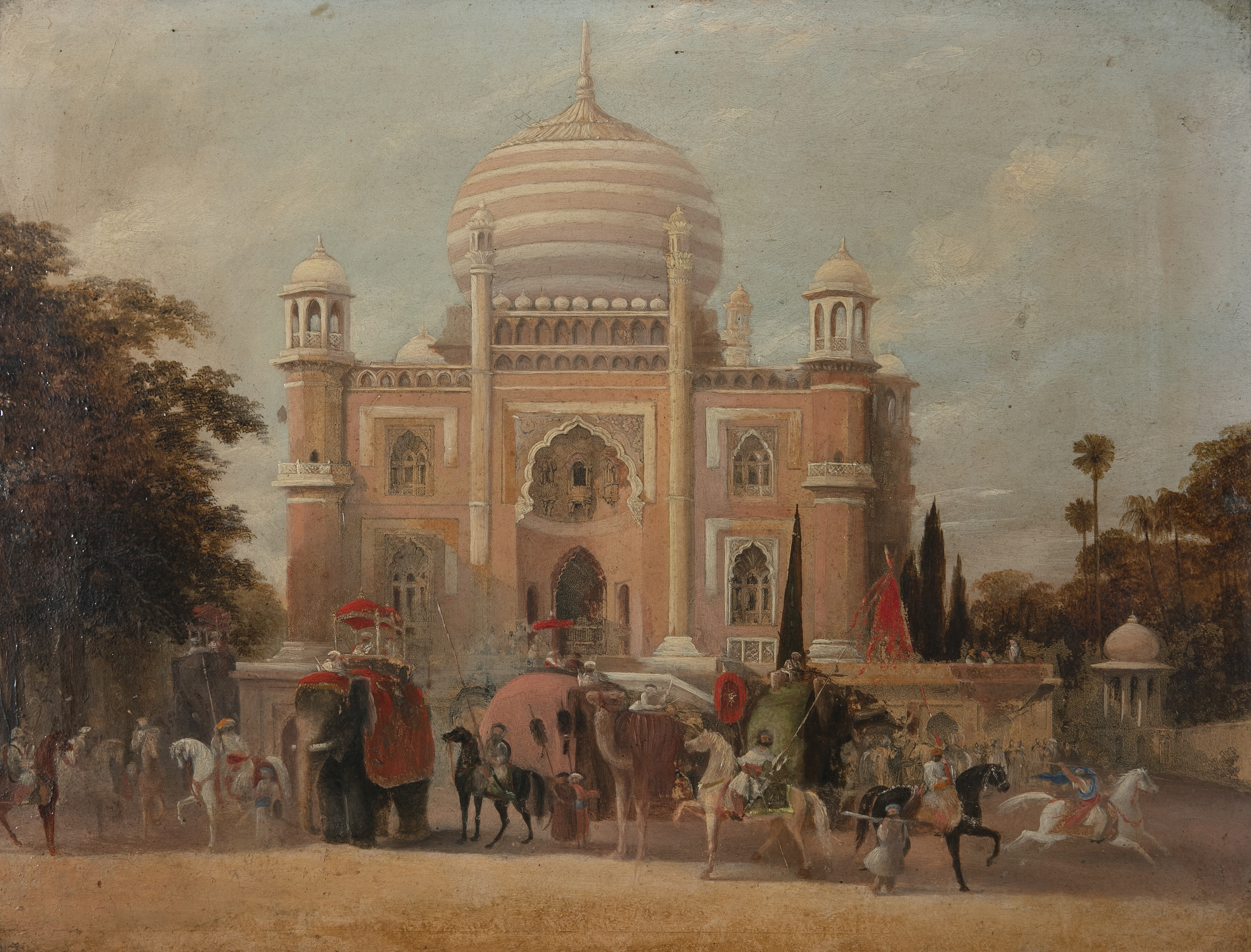
King of Delhi and his suite at the time of his capture by the English army

The British, eager to avenge the killing of several hundred of their countryfolk in Delhi, Cawnpore, and elsewhere in India, were in no mood to be merciful. Several hundred rebel prisoners as well as suspected rebels and sympathisers were subsequently hanged without trial or much legal process. In many cases, the officers of the "Queen's" Army were inclined to be lenient, but East India Company officials such as Theophilus Metcalfe were vengeful.

Bahadur Shah and three of his sons had taken refuge at Humayun's Tomb, 6 miles (9.7 km) south of Delhi. Although he was urged to accompany Bakht Khan and rally more troops, the aged Emperor was persuaded that the British were seeking vengeance only against the sepoys they regarded as mutineers, and he would be spared. On 20 September, a party under William Hodson took him into custody on promise of clemency and brought him back to the city. The next day, Hodson also took prisoner two of Bahadur Shah's sons and a grandson, but with no guarantee of any sort. On the pretext that a mob was about to release them, Hodson executed the three princes at Khooni Darwaza (Bloody Gate). Their heads were later presented to Bahadur Shah, who was subsequently put on trial by the British Military Commission. He was exiled to Rangoon in British-controlled Burma in 1858, after being convicted on several charges.

By recapturing the Indian capital city, the British and Company forces dealt the Indian Army mutineers a major military and psychological blow, while releasing troops to assist in the relief of Lucknow, thus contributing to another British victory.

A total of 29 Victoria Crosses were awarded to recipients for bravery in the Siege of Delhi. A Delhi clasp was authorised for the Indian Mutiny Medal.
