= Richard Baird Smith =

British engineer officer

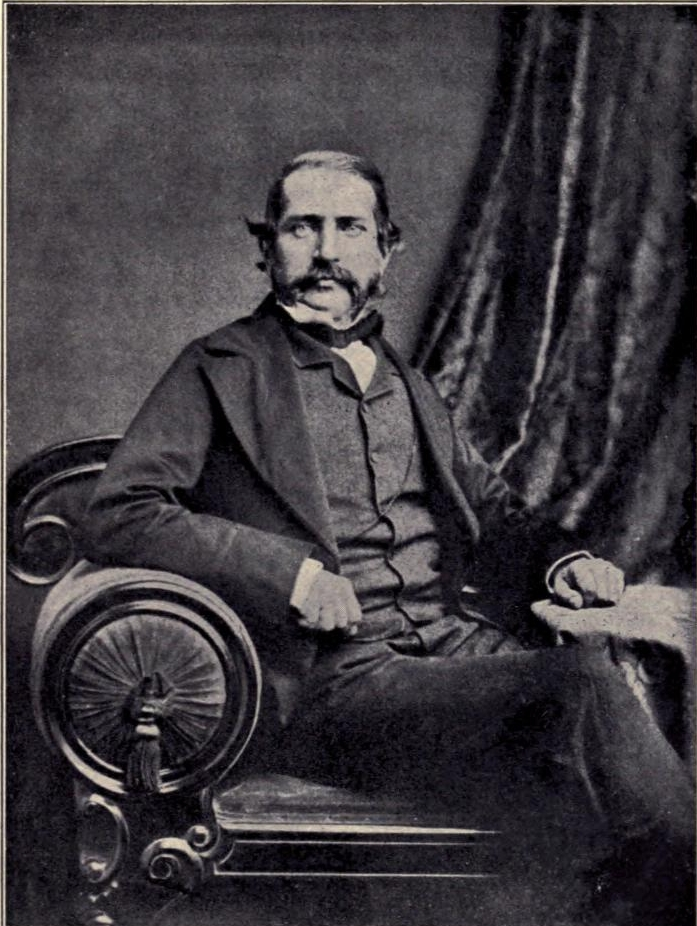
- Born: 31 December 1818; Lasswade, Scotland
- Died: 13 December 1861 (aged 42); Delhi, British India
- Occupation: Engineer official
- Known for: Chief Engineer during the Siege of Delhi
- Spouse: Florence Elizabeth
- Children: Florence May Smith; Margaret Eleanor Smith

Richard Baird Smith (31 December 1818 – 13 December 1861) was a British engineer officer in the East India Company, who played a prominent part as Chief Engineer in the Siege of Delhi of 1857.

== Early life ==
Baird Smith was born on 31 December 1818 in Lasswade, Midlothian, the son of Richard Smith (1794–1863), a Royal Navy surgeon now in private practice, and his wife, Margaret Young (1800–1829). He was educated at the Lasswade School and at Duns Academy.

== Career ==
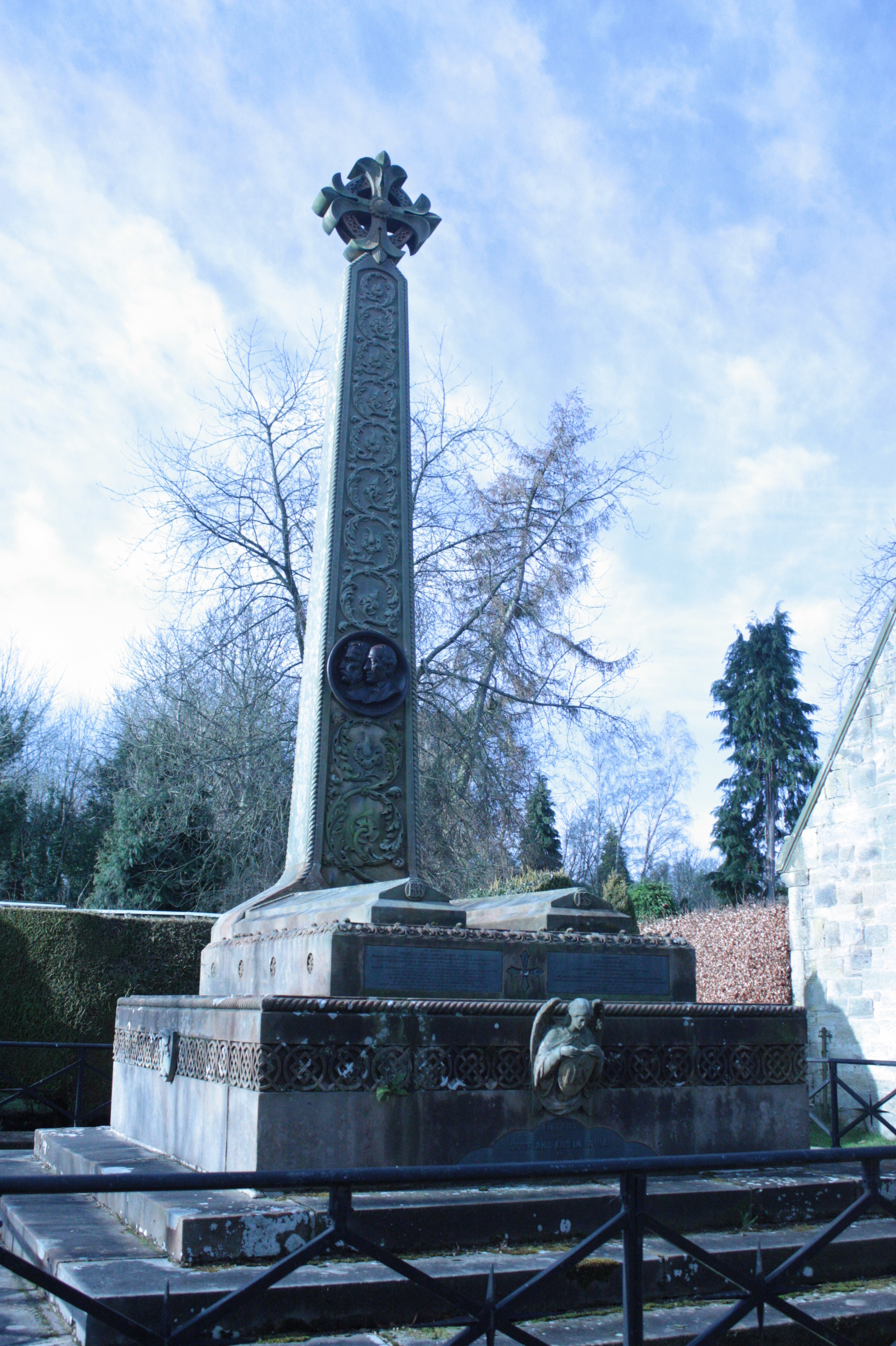
The Baird Smith monument in Lasswade

Baird Smith proceeded to the East India Company's Military Seminary at Addiscombe, from where he obtained his commission in December 1836. He joined the Madras Engineers in 1838. Being transferred to the Bengal Engineers, he served through the second Anglo-Sikh War, and was present at the battles of Hatiiwal, Aliwal and Sobraon. He was then for some years employed on canal work, and when the Indian Mutiny broke out was in charge of Roorkee. He promptly concentrated the Europeans in the workshops, and though the native sappers deserted, his forethought prevented any loss of life.

When Delhi was invested he was appointed chief engineer in charge of the siege works. He reached Delhi on the end of July, and immediately advised General Barnard to assault the city. Barnard died while the advice was still under consideration, and his successor, General Reed, did not follow it. Reed in turn was succeeded by Archdale Wilson, who found the besieging force too weak.

Baird Smith advised Wilson against relaxing his hold on Delhi. John Nicholson arrived with reinforcements from the Punjab, and the siege train came up from Phillour. Nicholson then joined Baird Smith in persuading Wilson to make the assault, which proved successful, on 14 September. Baird Smith was ably assisted by Captain Alexander Taylor; but Nicholson was unjust to Baird Smith in assigning to Taylor the chief credit for the siege operations.

After the capture of Delhi he returned to Roorkee and to civil employment, and for a time the value of his military services was insufficiently recognized. After the Mutiny he was made ADC to Queen Victoria, became secretary to the government of India in the public works department, and gained well-deserved credit in the famine of 1861. But the onerous character of this work, following a wound and illness at Delhi, broke down his constitution, and he died at sea on 13 December 1861.

== Personal life ==
Baird Smith married Florence Elizabeth, second daughter of the writer Thomas De Quincey, on 10 January 1856. The couple had two daughters, Florence May and Margaret Eleanor.

== Memorials ==
A memorial to Smith by George Gilbert Scott stands in St Paul's Cathedral in Calcutta.

A very large memorial to both Smith and his father stands in their home town of Lasswade just north of the Old Kirkyard.
