= General Barnard =

General Barnard may refer to:

- Andrew Barnard (1773–1855), British Army general
- Henry William Barnard (1799–1857), British Army lieutenant general
- John G. Barnard (1815–1882), U.S. Army brigadier general and brevet major general
