= Lothian Cemetery =

Cemetery in Delhi, India

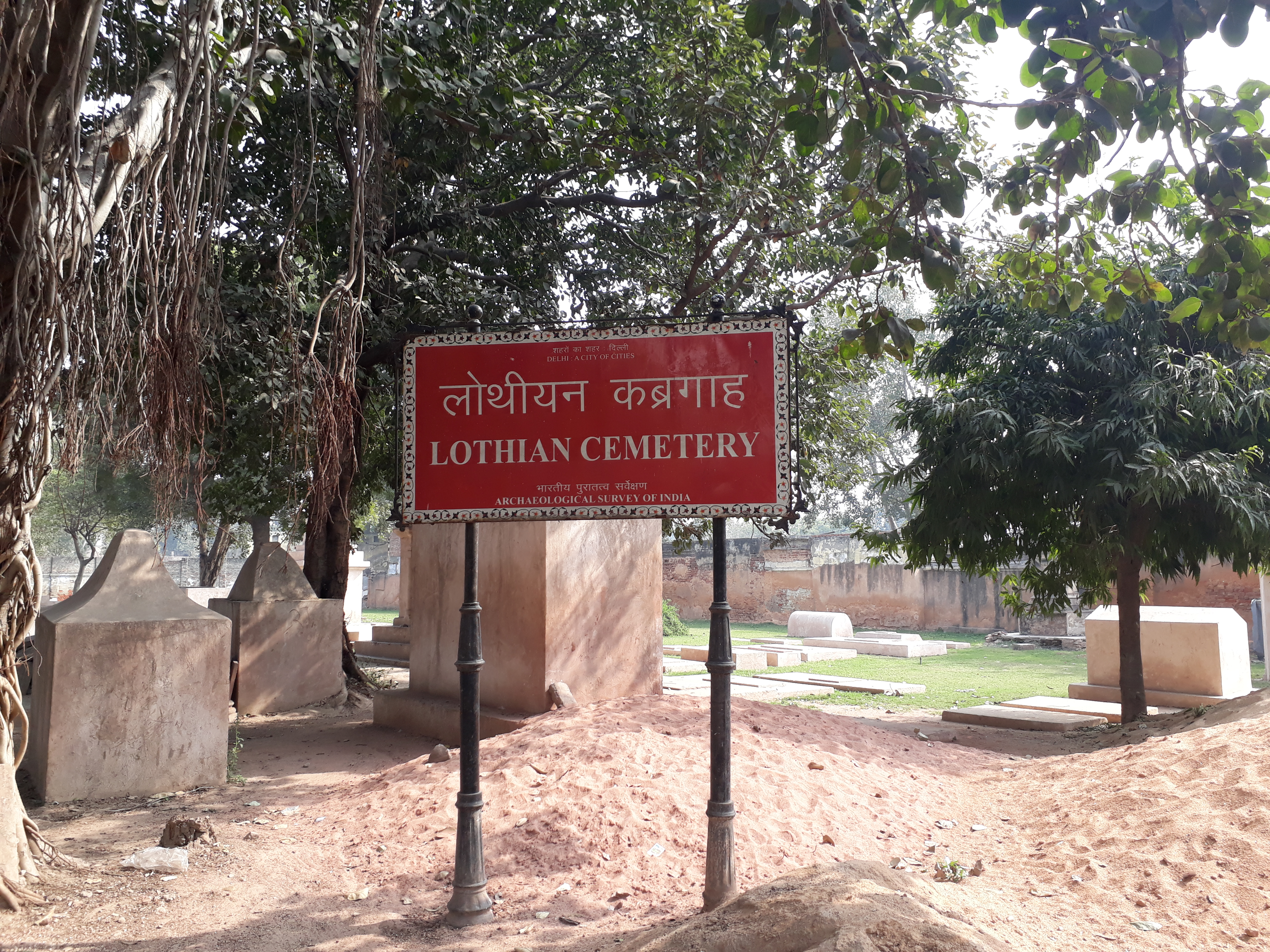
- Lothian Cemetery
- Interactive map of Lothian Cemetery

Details
- Established: 1808
- Location: Old Delhi
- Country: India
- Type: Christian
- Owned by: Archaeological Survey of India (ASI)

Lothian Cemetery is one of the oldest Christian cemeteries in Delhi and is located on Lothian Road, which lies near the Kauria Bridge bus stop, near the General Post Office at Kashmiri Gate in Old Delhi.

== History ==
This is the oldest graveyard of the Christian community of Delhi, whose members were buried here between 1808 and 1867. Lothian cemetery was built in 1808 and closed to burials in the 1960s. This burial ground is known as a haunted place in Delhi. Numerous European soldiers were buried here, with most of them killed during the first battle of the independence of India in 1857 or the Indian Rebellion of 1857. Staff of the East India Company, British women, and children who had died in cholera epidemics were also buried there. Although the cemetery is under the preservation of the Archaeological Survey of India, it is presently seen in a dilapidated state.

== Myth ==
Many mythical stories are related to Lothian Cemetery. Rumors are that one British officer, Sir Nicholas's ghost roams the graveyard. Nicholas fell in love with an Indian lady but could not be married. Heartbroken Nicholas shot himself in the head. Some people believe a headless Nicholas cries out the name of the woman he loved and walks in the cemetery.

== Gallery ==
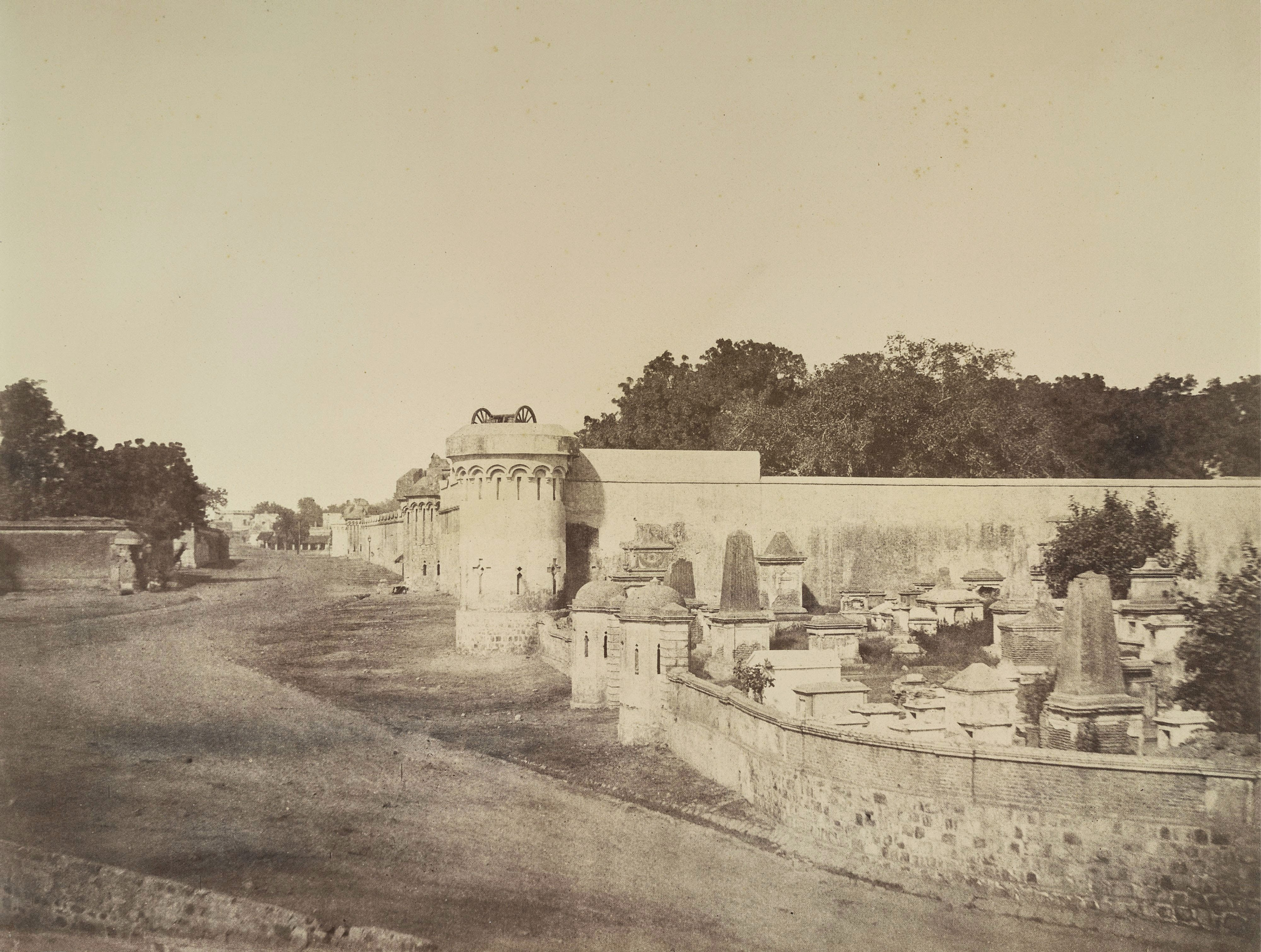
The walls of the British Magazine adjoining the Lothian Cemetery photographed in 1858 in the aftermath of The Defence of the Magazine at Delhi

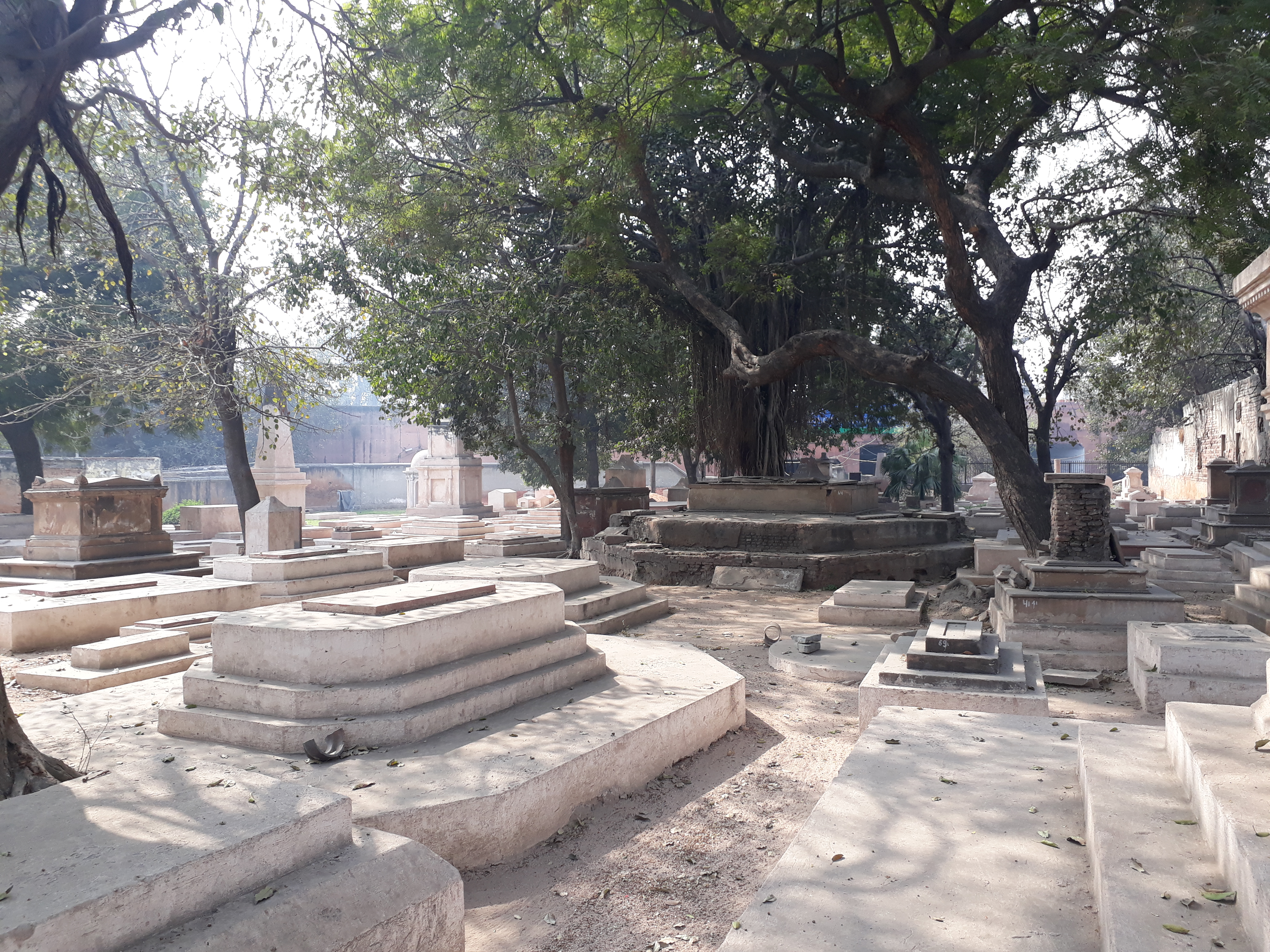
Graves in Lothian Cemetery

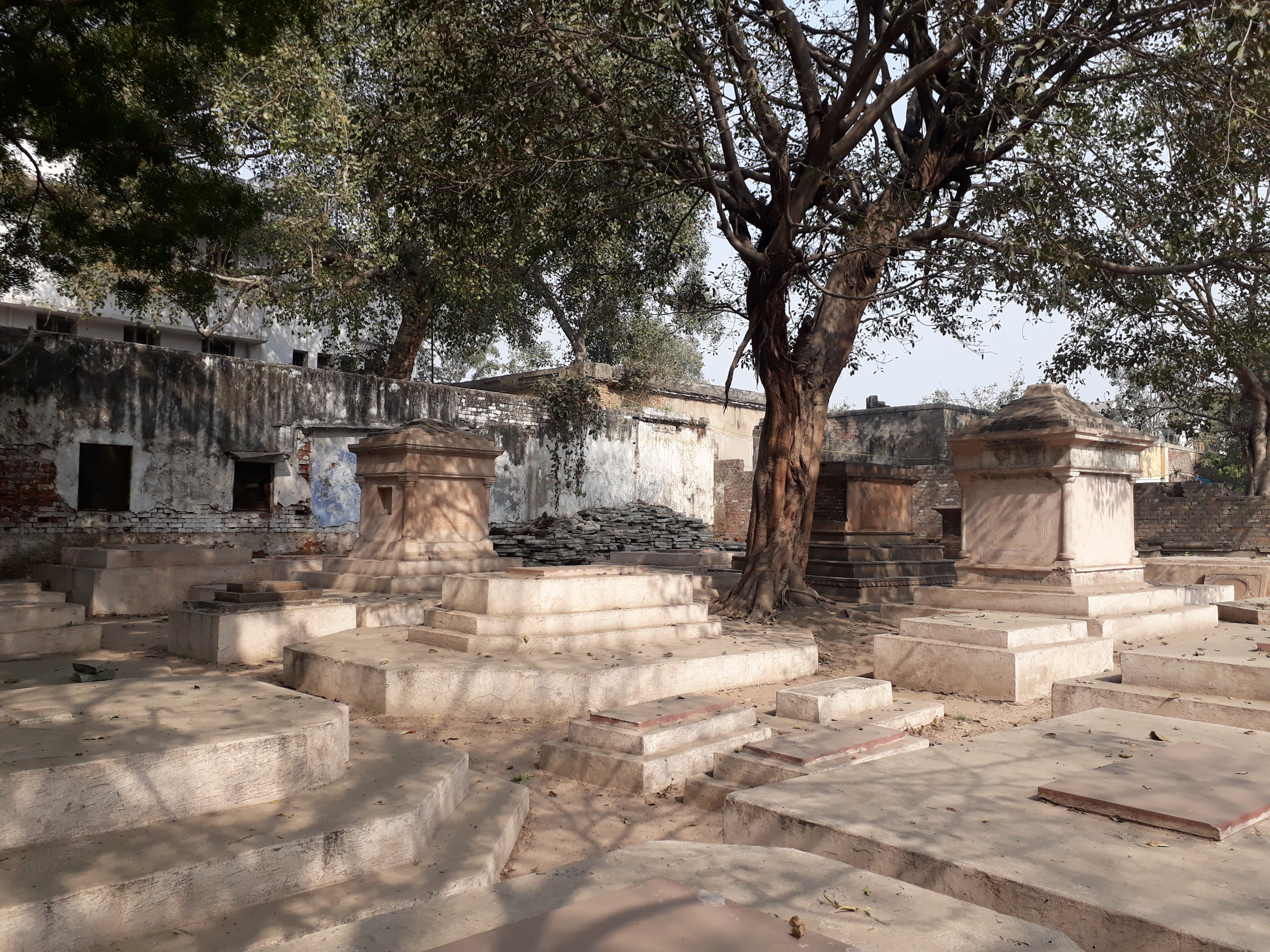
Graves in Lothian Cemetery

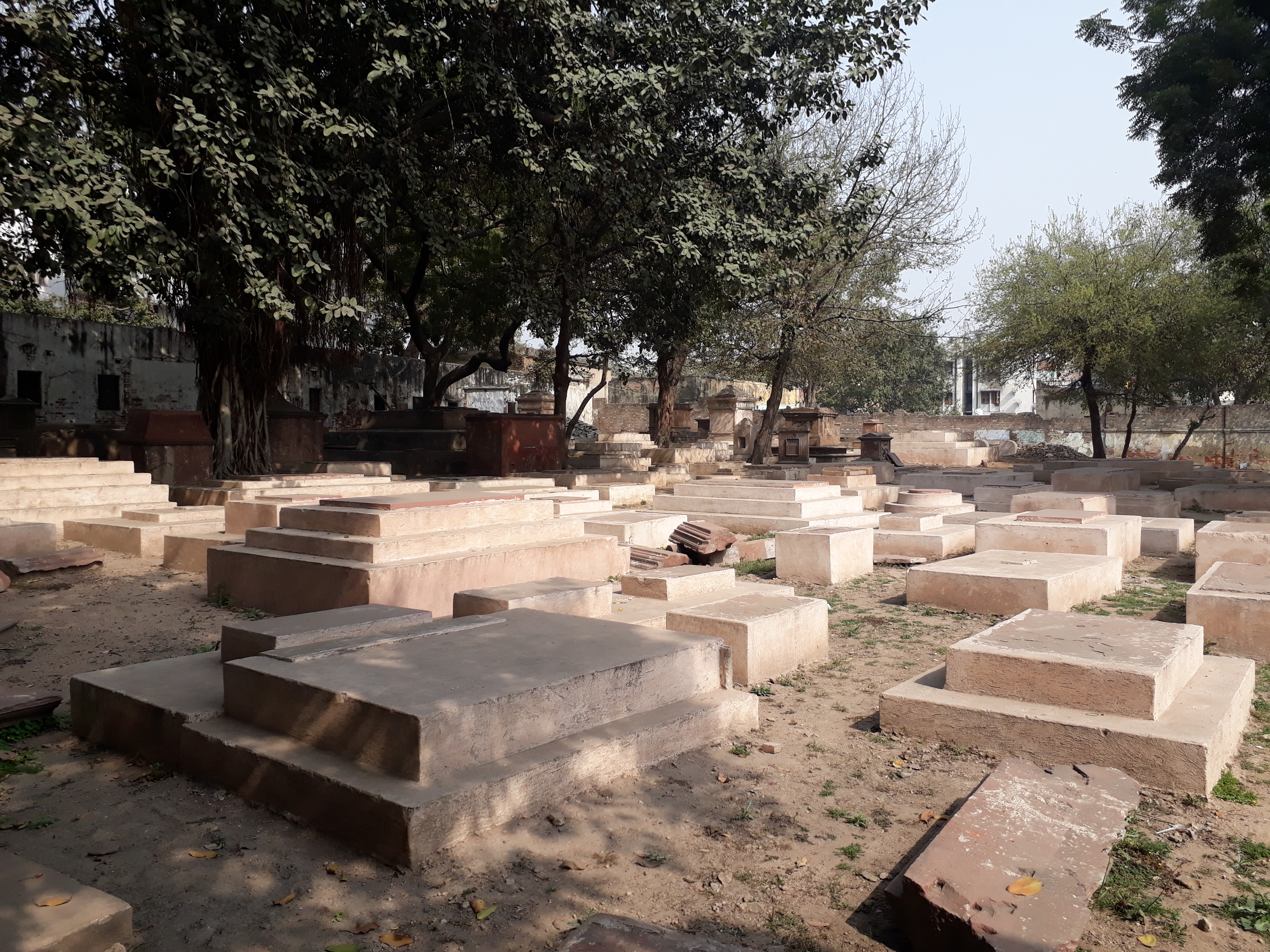
Inside views of Lothian Cemetery

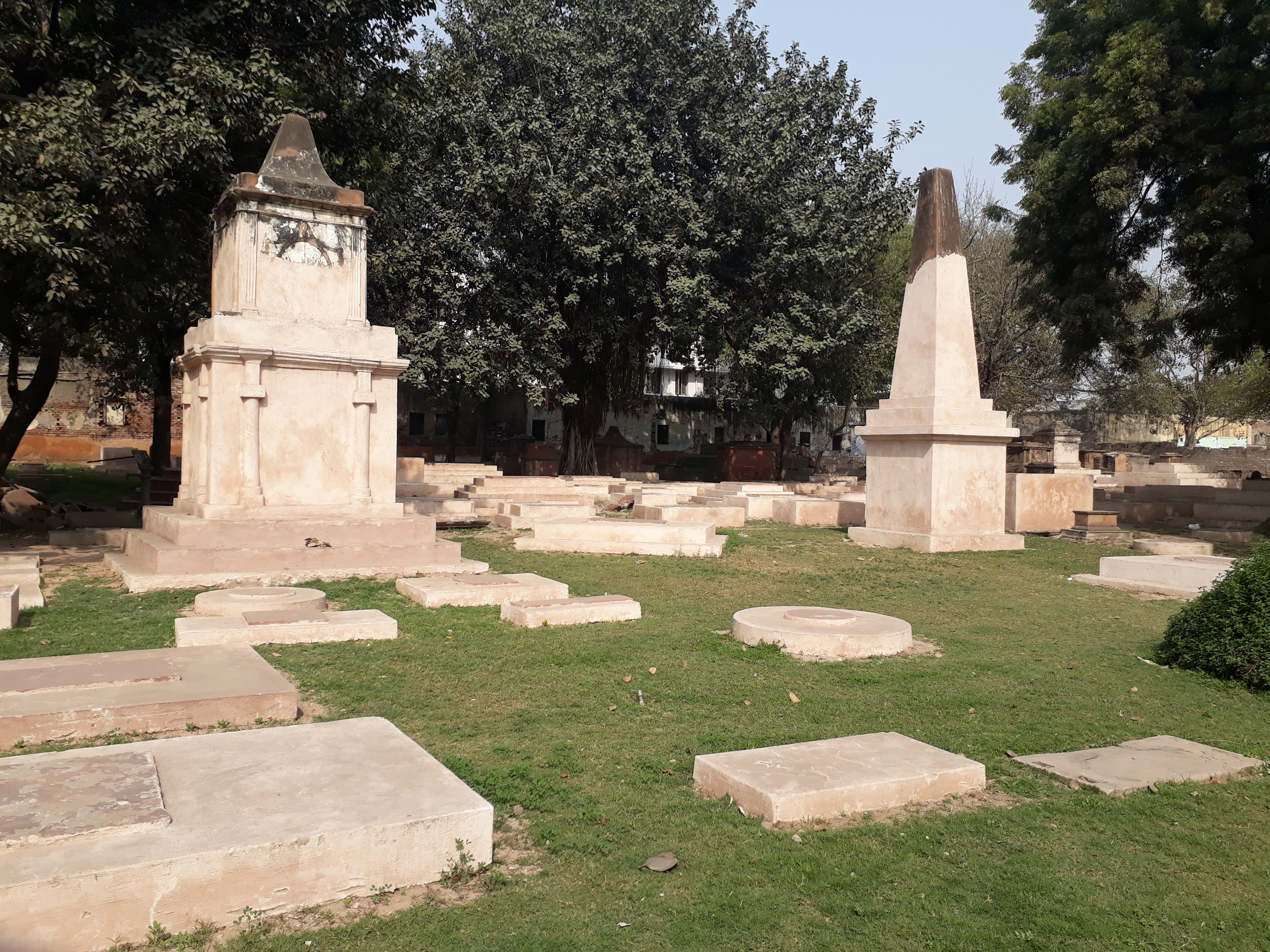
Tombs in the Cemetery

== See also ==
- Delhi War Cemetery
- Nicholson Cemetery
- Victory Tunnel
