= List of British residents or political agents in Delhi, 1803–1857 =

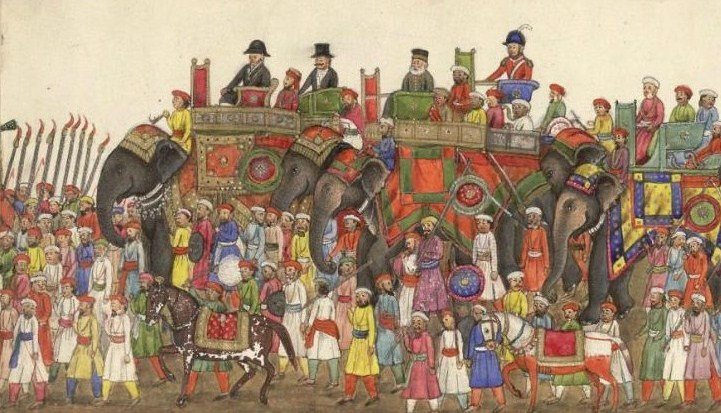
The British Resident in Delhi, the Assistant Resident, and the Commandant of the Escort, escorting Mughal Emperor Bahadur Shah Zafar II in a procession to celebrate the feast of Eid ul-Fitr.

The following is a list of residents or political agents of the East India Company to the court of the Mughal emperor in Delhi from 1803 to 1857. A resident or political agent was an official of the East India Company (and after 1813, the British Government), who was based in a princely state and who served as part-diplomat, part-adviser to the native ruler, and part monitor of activities in the princely state. He was an instrument of indirect rule of princely India by the British.

== List ==
1803 – 25 Jun 1806	David Ochterlony (1st tenure in office)	(1758–1825)
25 Jun 1806 – 1811	Archibald Seton	(1758–1818)
25 Feb 1811 – 1818	Charles Theophilus Metcalfe (1st tenure)	(s.a.) (1785–1846)
1818–1820	Sir David Ochterlony (2nd tenure)	(subject to approval (s.a.))
1820–1823	Alexander Ross	(1777–18)
1823	William Fraser (1st tenure) (acting)	(1784–1835)
1823 – Oct 1825	Sir Charles Elliott	(1776–1856)
26 Aug 1825 – 31 Jul 1827	Sir Charles Theophilus Metcalfe (2nd tenure)	(s.a.)
31 Jul 1827 – 1828	Sir Edward Colebrooke	
1828 – 1829	William Fraser (2nd tenure) (acting)	(s.a.)
18 Sep 1829 – Nov 1830	Francis James Hawkins	(1806–1860)
25 Nov 1830 – 1832	W. B. Martin	
1832 – 22 Mar 1835	William Fraser (3rd tenure)	(s.a.)
1835–1853	Sir Thomas Theophilus Metcalfe	(1795–1853)
Nov 1853 – 11 May 1857	Simon Fraser	(d. 1857)
