= Henry Barnard (British Army officer) =

British Army general (1799–1857)

Lieutenant-General Sir Henry Barnard KCB
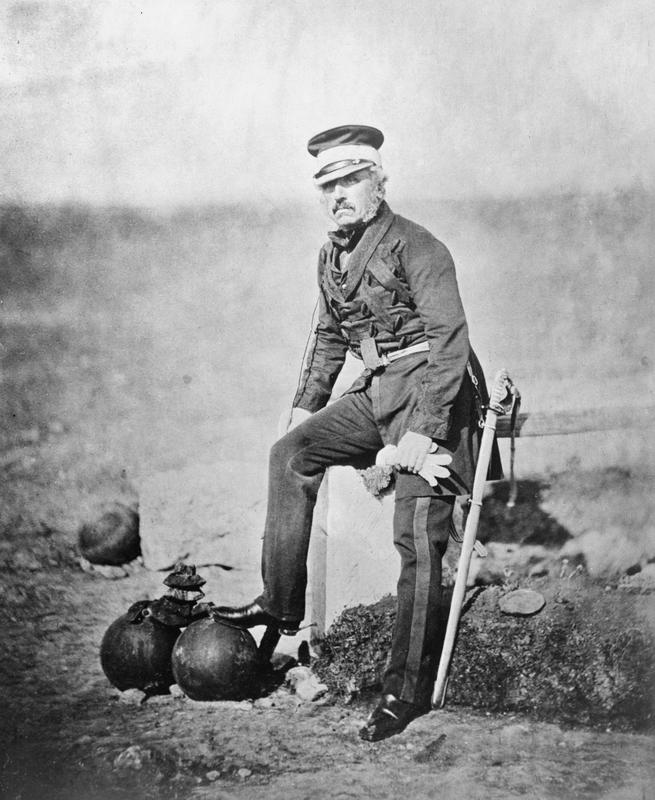
- Major-General Sir Henry Barnard with some cannonballs
- Born: 1799; Westbury, Buckinghamshire
- Died: 5 July 1857 (aged 57–58); British India
- Military career
- Allegiance: United Kingdom of Great Britain and Ireland
- Branch: British Army
- Rank: Lieutenant-General
- Units: Grenadier Guards; 3rd Division; 2nd Division
- Conflicts: Crimean War; Siege of Sevastopol; Indian Rebellion of 1857; Battle of Badli-ki-Serai; Siege of Delhi

Sir Henry William Barnard (1799 – 5 July 1857) was an officer of the British Army. He served during the First Anglo-Afghan War and the Crimean War, rising to the rank of lieutenant-general.

== Family and early life ==
Barnard, the son of the Reverend William Henry Barnard of Water Stratford, Buckinghamshire, and great-grandson of William Barnard, bishop of Derry, was born at Westbury, Buckinghamshire, in 1799. He was educated at Westminster School and Sandhurst, and obtained a commission in the Grenadier Guards in 1814. He served on the staff of his uncle, Sir Andrew Francis Barnard during the occupation of Paris, and afterwards on that of Sir John Keane in Jamaica. Later he was with his battalion in Canada, and filled various staff appointments at home.

== Crimean War ==
A newly made major-general on the outbreak of the Crimean War, Barnard landed in the Crimea in 1854, in command of a brigade of the 3rd, or Sir Richard England's, division of the army, with which he was present during the winter of 1854–5. When General James Simpson succeeded to the chief command on the death of Lord Raglan, Barnard became his chief of the staff, a position he held at the fall of Sevastopol in September 1855. Afterwards he commanded the 2nd division of the army in the Crimea.

== India ==
After brief periods of command at Corfu, Dover, and Shorncliffe, Barnard was appointed to the staff in Bengal, and reached Umballa, to take over the Sirhind division, towards the end of April 1857, when rumours of impending unrest were gathering fast. On 10 May occurred the outbreaks at Meerut and Delhi, the vague tidings of which reaching Umballa were at once sent on by Barnard, and gave the first warning of the Indian Rebellion of 1857 to the commander-in-chief, General George Anson, then at Simla. Upon Anson's death at Kurnaul a fortnight later, Barnard received in charge the scanty force available for the movement against Delhi, and at its head he struck a heavy blow at the mutineers, at the Battle of Badli-ki-Serai, on 8 June following, taking up his position on the ridge commanding the north-west front of the city of Delhi the same evening, and laying siege to the city.

The military historian John William Kaye commented that the value of Barnard's victory was not to be measured by returns of killed and wounded or captured ordnance.

'It gave us an admirable base of operations—a commanding military position—open in the rear to the lines along which thenceforth our reinforcements and supplies and all that we looked for to aid us in the coming struggle were to be brought. And, great as this gain was to us in a military sense, the moral effect was scarcely less; for behind the ridge lay the old cantonments, from which a month before the British had fled for their lives. On the parade-ground the British headquarters were now encamped, and the familiar flag of the Feringhees was again to be seen from the houses of the imperial city.'

Four weeks of desultory and unprofitable fighting followed, the besieged defenders, underestimated by most, outnumbering Barnard's force by six to one in men and four to one in guns. Barnard, like his predecessor Anson, was taken ill with cholera, and died on 5 July 1857, eleven weeks before the fall of the city. He was considered to have left behind him "the name of an officer, skilful, if little versed in Indian warfare, and a brave and chivalrous gentleman."

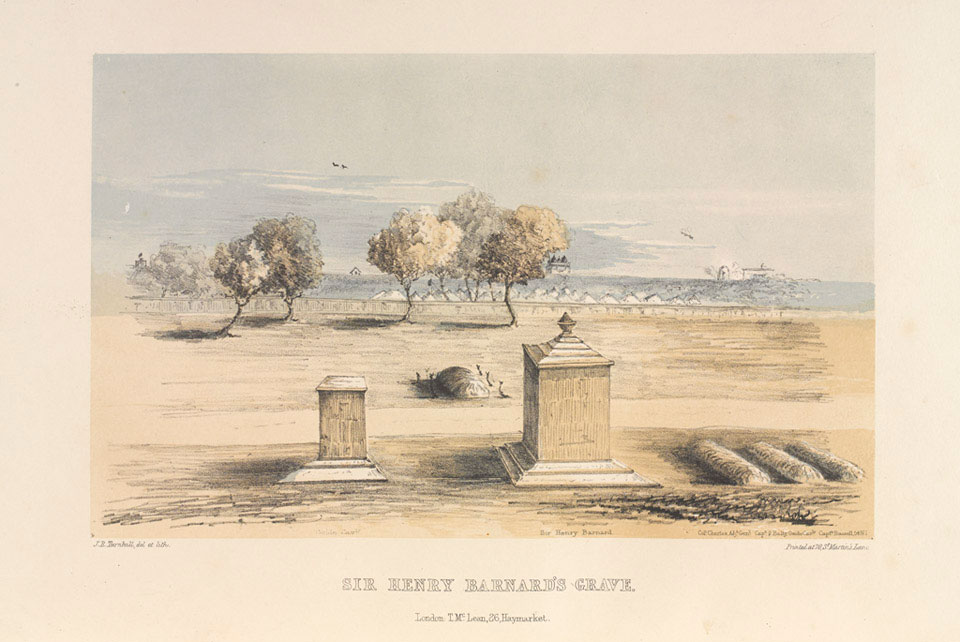
Sir Henry Barnard's Grave, Rajpur Cemetery, Delhi, by John R. Turnbull, ADC to Brigadier-General Archdale Wilson

== See also ==
- List of British recipients of the Légion d'Honneur for the Crimean War
