= 52nd (Oxfordshire) Regiment of Foot =

British light infantry regiment (1755–1881)

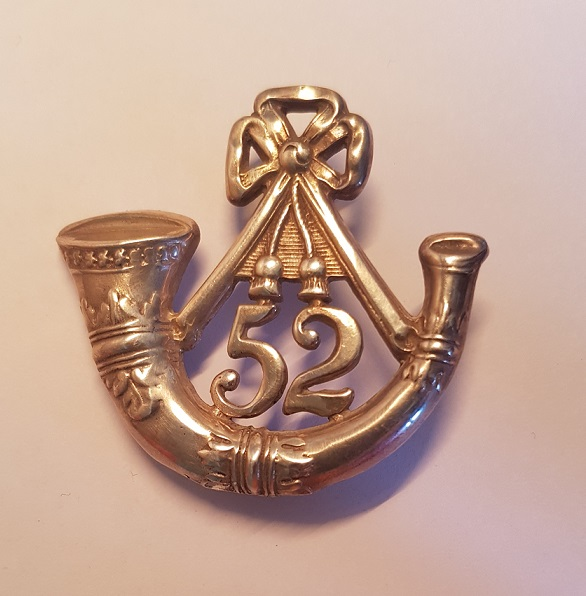
- Cap badge of the 52nd (Oxfordshire) Regiment of Foot
- Active: 1755–1881
- Country: Kingdom of Great Britain (1755–1800); United Kingdom (1801–1881)
- Branch: British Army
- Type: Line infantry
- Role: Light infantry
- Size: One battalion (two battalions 1799–1803; 1804–1815)
- Garrison/HQ: Cowley Barracks, Oxford
- Nickname: "The Light Bobs"
- Colours: Buff and scarlet
- March: "Lower Castle Yard"
- Engagements: American Revolutionary War (1775–1778) including: Lexington and Concord; Bunker Hill; Siege of Boston; Long Island; White Plains; Occupation of Newport, Rhode Island; Fort Washington; Princeton; Brandywine; Philadelphia campaign; Fort Montgomery; Second & Third Anglo-Mysore Wars (1783–1793) including: Cannanore; Bangalore; Seringapatam (1792); French Revolutionary Wars (1793–1801) including: Pondicherry, Ceylon, Quiberon, Cádiz, Ferrol; Copenhagen (1807); Peninsular War (1808–1814) including: Vimeiro; Corunna; Côa; Bussaco; Casal Novo; Sabugal; Fuentes de Oñoro; Ciudad Rodrigo; Badajoz (1812); Salamanca; Vitoria; Pyrenees; San Marcial; Bidassoa; Nivelle; Nive; Orthez; Tarbes; Toulouse; Walcheren Campaign (1809); Holland (1813–14); Waterloo (1815); Indian Mutiny (1857–8)

Commanders
- Notable commanders: Sir John Clavering (1762–1778); Cyrus Trapaud (1778–1801); Sir John Moore (1801–1809); Sir John Colborne (1811–15)

The 52nd (Oxfordshire) Regiment of Foot was a light infantry regiment of the British Army throughout much of the 18th and 19th centuries. The regiment first saw active service during the American War of Independence, and were posted to India during the Anglo-Mysore Wars. During the Napoleonic Wars, the 52nd were part of the Light Division, and were present at most major battles of the Peninsula campaign, becoming one of the most celebrated regiments, described by Sir William Napier as "a regiment never surpassed in arms since arms were first borne by men". They had the largest British battalion at Waterloo, 1815, where they formed part of the final charge against Napoleon's Imperial Guard. They were also involved in various campaigns in India.

The regiment was raised as a line regiment in 1755 and numbered as the "54th Foot"; they were renumbered as the "52nd Regiment of Foot" in 1757. In 1781, the regional designation "52nd (Oxfordshire) Regiment of Foot" was given and in 1803 the regiment was designated "Light Infantry". In 1881, the regiment was merged with the 43rd (Monmouthshire) Regiment of Foot to become the regiment later known as the Oxfordshire and Buckinghamshire Light Infantry.

== Regimental structure ==
Throughout the period of the 52nd's existence, the British Army comprised both infantry and cavalry line regiments, as well as the Household Divisions. The regiments of the line were numbered and, from 1781, were given territorial designations – "Oxfordshire" in the 52nd's case – which roughly represented the area from which troops were drawn. This was not rigid, and most English regiments had a significant proportion of Irish and Scots. Regiments comprised at least one battalion, often two – as the 52nd did intermittently – and occasionally more. Commanded by a lieutenant colonel, an infantry battalion was composed of ten companies, of which eight were "centre" companies, and two flank companies: one a grenadier and one (in regular line regiments) a specialist light company. Companies were commanded by captains, with lieutenants and ensigns (or subalterns) beneath him. Ideally, a battalion comprised 1000 men (excluding NCOs, musicians and officers); the 1st (or senior) battalion of a regiment would frequently draw fit recruits from the 2nd battalion to maintain its strength. If also sent on active service, the 2nd battalion would consequently be weaker. In periods of long service, battalions were generally operating under strength. Seriously under-strength battalions might be dissolved, or temporarily drafted into other regiments, as happened to the 52nd on several occasions.

The 52nd was initially a one-battalion regiment, but increased recruiting resulted in the creation of a second battalion in 1798. While the 1st Battalion saw some action in Spain and Portugal in 1800–1801, the 2nd remained stationed in England. In 1803 the regiment's fittest officers and men were concentrated in the 1st battalion, for training as light infantry, and the 2nd battalion was transferred to the 96th Foot. A new second battalion was raised in 1804. Both battalions saw extensive action during the Napoleonic Wars, and they were brigaded together for a time during the Peninsula Campaign, but heavy losses at Badajoz in 1812 resulted in the reduction of the 2nd battalion to a cadre (skeleton staff). The 2nd was eventually reformed with new recruits and saw service in Holland in 1813–14. Following the conclusion of the war in 1814, both battalions were billeted in England, where the 2nd's effectives were transferred to the 1st battalion, in preparation for further service. The 2/52nd remained in England during the Waterloo campaign, and were disbanded in 1815. Subsequently, the 52nd remained a one-battalion regiment until their merger with the 43rd.

== Light infantry ==
Initially raised as a regular line regiment, the 52nd fought in the line during the American wars and the early Indian campaigns, and did not become a light regiment until 1803. Prior to this, the British Army had relied on irregulars and mercenaries to provide most of its light infantry or, when conditions demanded it, temporarily seconded regular line companies. While regular regiments were required to include one company of light infantry from 1758, the training of such light troops was inconsistent, and frequently inadequate. Consequently, when beginning a restructure of the British Army in the late 18th century, the Duke of York recognised a need for dedicated light troops, especially coming into a war against Napoleon and his experienced light infantry, the chasseurs. During the French Revolutionary Wars, the British army's light infantry was bolstered by mercenaries from Germany and the Low Countries, but British light infantry proved inadequate against their more effective French counterparts during the Flanders campaign and the 1799 Anglo-Russian invasion of Holland and infantry reform became urgent.

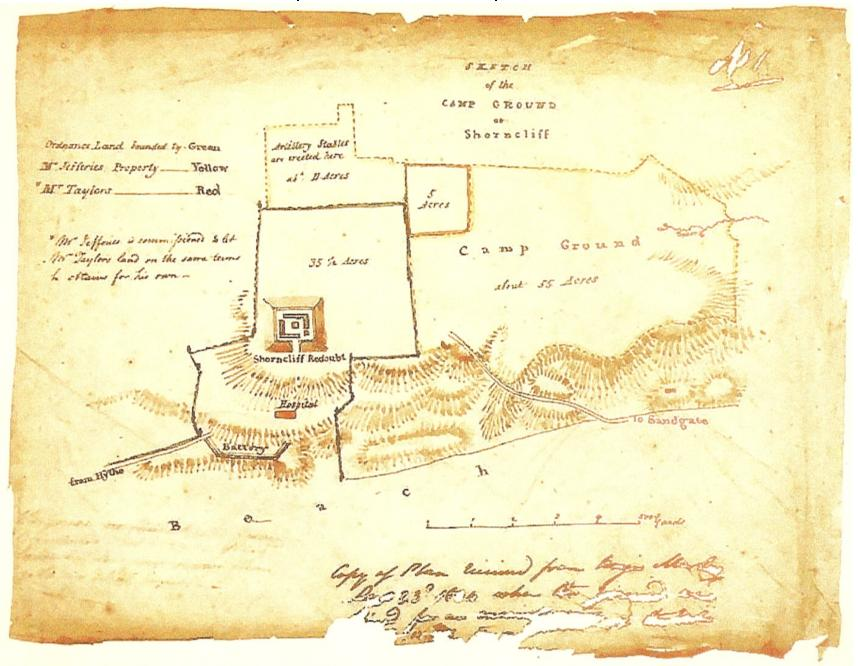
Map of Shorncliffe Camp – 1801.

In 1801, the "Experimental Corps of Riflemen" was raised (later designated the 95th Rifles), and a decision was made to train some line regiments in light infantry techniques, so they might operate as both light and line infantry. Sir John Moore, a proponent of the light infantry model, suggested that his own regiment of line infantry, the 52nd, undergo this training, at Shorncliffe Camp. They were followed shortly afterwards by the 43rd Foot, by whose side they would fight many campaigns as part of the Light Division. Several other famous line regiments were designated "light infantry" in 1808, such as the 85th, or The King's Regiment of Light Infantry (Bucks Volunteers).

Moore wrote of the 52nd in his diary that "it is evident that not only the officers, but that each individual soldier, knows perfectly what he has to do; the discipline is carried on without severity, the officers are attached to the men and the men to the officers." This had much to do with the method of training; unlike other regiments, light infantry officers drilled with the men and were expected to be familiar with drill routines, including weapons training. The ranks also received additional training, and were encouraged to develop initiative and self-direction; while skirmishing in the field they would need to react without direct orders. While most regiments of the time fought in tight formation, allowing easy administration of orders, light infantry worked in small groups, in advance of the main line, so complicated bugle calls were developed to pass orders. Consequently, the bugle became the emblem of the light infantry regiments.

When skirmishing, light infantry fought in pairs, so that one soldier could cover the other while loading. Line regiments fired in volleys, but skirmishers fired at will, taking careful aim at targets. While some consideration was given to equipping light infantry with rifles, due to their improved accuracy, the expected difficulty and expense in obtaining sufficient rifled weapons resulted in the standard infantry musket being issued to most troops. The accuracy of the musket decreased at long range and, since the French chasseurs and voltigeurs also used muskets, it is likely that skirmishers' firefights took place at ranges of only 50 yards (or less). 10 yards provided the accuracy of point-blank range. Although the French infantry (and, earlier, the Americans) frequently used multi-shot and grapeshot in their muskets, the British light infantry used only standard ball ammunition.

Light infantry were equipped more lightly than regular line regiments, and marched at 140 paces per minute. Tasks of the light infantry included advance and rear guard action, flanking protection for armies and forward skirmishing. They were also called upon to take regular line formations during battles, or to act as part of fortification storming parties. During the Peninsular War they were regarded as the army's elite corps.

== Regimental history ==
=== Early history ===
The 52nd began as a standard infantry line regiment in 1755, when Colonel Hedworth Lambton received papers to raise a new regiment, to be numbered as the 54th Foot. It was renumbered as the "52nd Regiment of Foot" in 1757, and was stationed in England and Ireland. (At the same time, the previous 52nd Foot was renamed the 50th Foot.) In c. October 1765, the Regiment was posted to Quebec, Canada. The regiment, under the command of Colonel John Clavering, departed Cork, Ireland aboard the transport Pitt, for Quebec. En route the ship ran aground in dense fog in the Gulf of St. Lawrence, near the coast of Nova Scotia; the wreck remained intact enough for all on board, including the soldiers' wives, to disembark safely, transferring their effects and regimental provisions to shore. General Murray, Governor of Quebec, sent a schooner to retrieve the personnel and belongings, and carry them to Quebec.

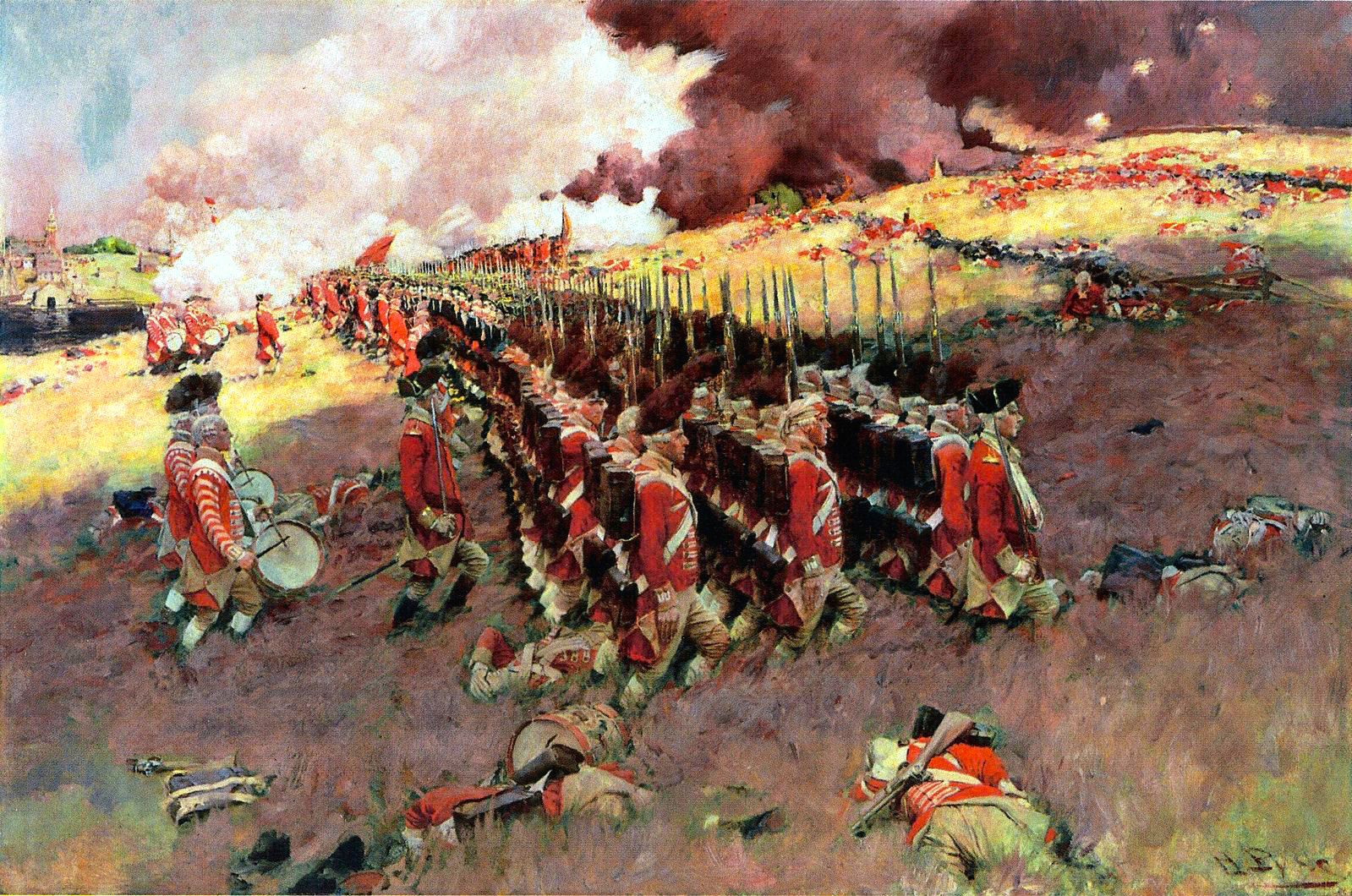
Bunker Hill, 1775, by Howard Pyle, showing a battalion with buff facings, as worn by the 52nd and 22nd Foot

=== American War of Independence ===
Twenty years after its founding, the regiment saw active service in the American War of Independence, from 1774 to 1778. The 52nd was shipped to America from Canada, arriving in Boston, and fought in the battles of Lexington and Bunker Hill in 1775. Major-General William Howe led the main assault at Bunker Hill with Brigadier Robert Pigot leading the 52nd and 43rd Foot in support. This was the first occasion that the 52nd fought alongside the 43rd. They suffered heavy casualties at Bunker Hill, and in their grenadier company, only 8 men were left unwounded. In August, 1778, the men were drafted into other regiments and the officers returned to England. The regiment obtained new recruits and in 1782 the introduction of county titles for regiments resulted in the 52nd adding "Oxfordshire" to their name.

=== Indian Wars ===
In 1783, the 52nd arrived in Madras, for nine years of war spanning the Second and Third Anglo-Mysore Wars. The Second War had begun in 1778, when the British responded to news of war against France by moving against French-held bases in India. Hyder Ali, then ruler of Mysore, sided with the French and marched against the British. Hyder died in 1782, and was succeeded by his son, Tipu Sultan, who continued the war through some minor campaigns until a peace treaty was signed in 1784. Shortly afterwards, a detachment from the 52nd took part in the 1785 siege of Cannanore. The 52nd stormed the breach at Cannanore, under command of Sir Martin Hunter.

In 1786, Lord Cornwallis was appointed Governor-general, and the war against Tipu Sultan was resumed after Tipu attacked British allies in 1789. (This was known as the Third Mysore war). Initially, military actions were fairly minor. In 1790, the 52nd were involved at Pollighautcherry and in a battle near Seringapatam. In 1791, the regiment fought at Bangalore in March, and Arakere (near Seringapatam) in May. In December that year, the flank companies from the 52nd and 76th Foot, with sepoy grenadiers, formed the storming party during the assault on Savandroog; the defenders abandoned the fortress, and it was successfully taken at the cost of just one British soldier wounded. Throughout the assault, the band of the 52nd played to spur on the attackers. The 52nd were also present at the February 1792 siege of Seringapatam, where the battalion's grenadier company received heavy casualties while crossing the Kaveri River. During that battle, the 52nd came to the aid of Lord Cornwallis, whose companies were exposed and in danger of capture. Tipu Sultan sued for peace during the siege, and a treaty was signed in 1792, ending the war. However, in August 1793 the regiment took part in an assault on Pondicherry.

=== French Revolutionary Wars ===
In 1793 war broke out with Revolutionary France. Following the French occupation of the Netherlands in January 1795 and the creation of the Batavian Republic, an assault was planned on the Dutch colony at Ceylon. A force commanded by Colonel James Stuart, of the 72nd Foot, and including the 52nd, left India for Ceylon, laying siege to Trincomalee; by February 1796 the island was in British hands. The 52nd returned to Britain in 1798 where, bolstered by new recruits, a second battalion was created. In 1800 the 1/52nd took part in the Quiberon Bay, Vigo, Cádiz and Ferrol expeditions and, after short stations in Gibraltar and Lisbon, returned to England in 1801. In January 1803, the regiment's 2nd battalion was transferred into the 96th Foot; prior to the transfer, the fittest men and officers were seconded by the 1st battalion, which was converted into "a corps of light infantry", and began training under Major-General John Moore (who was also Colonel of the 52nd) at Shorncliffe Camp. They formed a brigade with the 95th Rifles, and three line regiments. Much of the training was undertaken by Lieutenant-Colonel Kenneth MacKenzie, who devised many of the tactics of light infantry training. A new second battalion was raised in 1804.

=== Napoleonic Wars ===
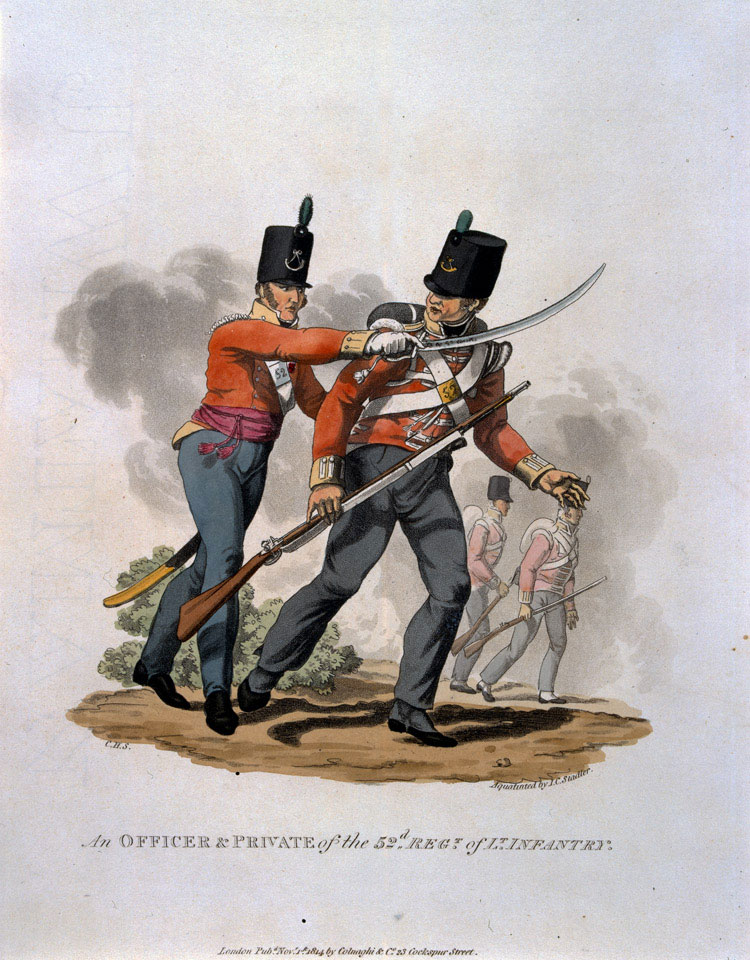
1812 engraving of a regimental officer and private

Both battalions of the 52nd experienced active service throughout the Napoleonic Wars, their paths occasionally overlapping. In 1806–7 the 1st battalion was stationed in Sicily, where they helped train local soldiers; later, they accompanied Moore to Sweden. In August 1806, the 2nd battalion accompanied the expedition to Copenhagen, taking part in the 1807 assault against Copenhagen, which was led by General Wellesley. The 2/52nd landed in Portugal in August 1808 and, with the 2/43rd, were positioned in the village of Vimeiro to provide cover for the army landings at the nearby Maceira Bay. Three companies of the 2/52nd were posted with the advance guard, and were the first to encounter the enemy during the Battle of Vimeiro. Following the battle the British commander Wellesley was superseded in turn by two superiors, Sir Harry Burrard and Sir Hew Dalrymple respectively, who signed the Convention of Sintra. The three commanders were recalled to England to explain their actions, and the command of the British troops devolved on Sir John Moore, the 52nd's colonel.

In October, Sir John Moore led the army into Spain, reaching as far as Salamanca. In December, they were reinforced by 10,000 troops from England, including the '1st Flank Brigade', which consisted of 1/52nd, 1/43rd and 1/95th and led by Robert Craufurd. Moore's army now totalled 25,000, but his advance was cut short by the news that Napoleon had defeated the Spanish, held Madrid, and was approaching with an army of 200,000. Moore turned his men, and retreated to Corunna, over mountain roads and through bitter winter weather. French cavalry pursued the British Army the length of the journey, and a Reserve Division was set up to provide rearguard protection for the British troops. The core of this Reserve, commanded by Edward Paget, consisted of the 1/52nd and 1/95th battalions, who displayed none of the ill-discipline which plagued other regiments during the retreat, but "made a stand at every defile and riverline, buying time for the rest of the army to get away." Following the secondment of the 1/52nd and 1/95th to the Reserve, Craufurd's 1st Flank Brigade was reformed, and comprised the 1/43rd, 2/52nd and 2/95th. The 1st Flank Brigade deployed with the Reserve for a time, protecting the crossing of the river Esla near Benavente, before it separated from the Reserve and the main army and marched to Vigo, with over 4,000 other troops, for eventual transportation to England. The 1/52nd remained with the main army, which was caught by the French at Corunna. During the ensuing battle, in January 1809, Moore was killed; the army, including the 1/52nd, were evacuated to England.

=== Wellesley's Peninsular Campaign ===
The 1/52nd, along with 1/43rd and 1/95th, returned to the Peninsula in June 1809, where they were designated the "Light Brigade", under the command of General Craufurd. Alighting in Lisbon and hearing of the army's engagement with the French, they undertook a forced march to Talavera, arriving mere hours after the battle. The march was an extraordinary achievement, covering 42 miles in 26 hours, at a time when an infantry march of 15 miles a day was standard. Henceforth, the 1/52nd generally remained in advance of the army, as a forward party, a role which was to be theirs throughout much of the war. In February 1810, Portuguese Cazadores were added to Craufurd's brigade, creating the Light Division, the 1/52nd forming a brigade with 1st Cazadores and four companies from the 95th, under Lt-Col Barclay. While holding a forward outpost, the Light Division was involved in the Battle of the Côa, in July 1810, and took part in the Battle of Bussaco, where the Light Division held the left against the main French charge, which they successfully repulsed, inflicting high casualties; 1200 Frenchmen were killed, wounded or captured, while the Light Division suffered only 120 casualties. When Wellington's army retreated to the Lines of Torres Vedras, late 1810, the Light Division acted as rearguard. The French were unable to breach the Torres Vedras defences, but engaged the British army in a number of small skirmishes, such as those fought by the Light Division, under the temporary command of Sir William Erskine, at Casal Novo – where they unwittingly came upon 11 French divisions in the fog – and Sabugal (April 1811), an engagement of which Wellington later wrote: "I consider that the action that was fought by the Light Division [...] with the whole of the [French] 2nd Corps, to be the most glorious that British troops were ever engaged in."

After returning to England in 1809, the 52nd's 2nd battalion had joined the unsuccessful Walcheren Campaign in the Netherlands. Walcheren was surrounded by marshes, and many of the officers and men came down with "Walcheren Fever" (malaria), which was to recur for years afterwards, and deplete the strength of the battalion. They eventually returned to the Peninsula in 1811 and were brigaded with their first battalion, who were manning outposts near Almeida. In early May, battle was engaged at Fuentes de Oñoro; initially set in the reserve, the Light Division came to the aid of the struggling British 7th Division, and provided a fighting retreat, as Wellington retired his army. For the rest of the year, both battalions of the 52nd, with the Light Division, manned outposts, which were constantly moved to mark the changing French positions.

January 1812 saw the siege of Ciudad Rodrigo. Companies from the Light Division, under the 52nd's Colonel Colborne, captured the Francisco redoubt on 9 January, and thereafter built trenches for the main assault, under enemy fire. Once the army's artillery had breached the walls, a 4-column assault was planned for 19 January, the Light Division forming the column which assaulted the breach near the Convent of San Francisco. Lt John Gurwood of the 52nd led the Forlorn Hope, followed by 300 "stormers" under the command of the 52nd's Major George Napier. The breach was carried and the fortress was taken within half an hour, at high cost. Amongst the 1300 British and Portuguese casualties was Craufurd, who died several days later. The army turned its attention to Badajoz, another strong fortress, which the British had failed to carry on an earlier occasion. The Light Division dug trenches near Fort Picurina, which was stormed, and established batteries. On 6 April, the breaches were deemed practicable, and the Light Division were ordered to storm the breach at Santa Maria. As the Light Division's Forlorn Hope reached the ditch, the French exploded a mine. Various other barricades and gunpowder defences were in place, and the toll at the breaches was heavy. Wellington ordered a withdrawal. Elsewhere, the fortress walls were achieved by escalade, encouraging an attack on the breaches again. The fortress was taken, at great cost (over 5000 British casualties), and for three days the army sacked and pillaged the town in undisciplined revenge. The 52nd and the 43rd together lost 39 officers and 700 men, resulting in a reduction of the 2/52nd, who saw no more action in the Peninsula.

Soon after the assault on Badajoz, Wellington marched his men to confront the French near Salamanca. For a month the armies marched and counter-marched against each other, seeking advantage, and on 22 July Wellington attacked in the Battle of Salamanca, achieving a comprehensive victory. The Light Division were in the reserve during the battle, and afterwards pursued and harried the retreating French. August saw the army in Madrid, where the 1/52nd remained while Wellington led a force on to Burgos, which he attempted to take. The siege was unsuccessful, and it was lifted by Wellington in October; the 1/52nd, with the Light Division, covered the army's retreat into Portugal. This "Winter Retreat" bore similarities with the earlier retreat to Corunna, as it suffered from poor supplies, bitter weather and rearguard action, including one skirmish near the River Huebra, where the 43rd and 1/52nd lost 95 men. Ciudad Rodrigo was reached on 19 November, where the 1/52nd were billeted and resupplied with both men and clothing. Diversions were set up, including the "Light Division Theatre", in which the 52nd were described as "highly gentlemanly men, of steady aspect; they mixed little with other corps, but attended the theatricals of the 43rd with circumspect good humour, and now and then relaxed."

In spring, 1813, the army returned to the offensive, leaving Portugal and marching northwards through Spain to Vitoria where the French stood in preparation for battle, which took place on 21 June. The Light Division held the centre of the Allied line, and took the bridges of Villodas and Tres Puentes. The battle proved an overwhelming victory for the British, and the following day the 1/52nd, with the Light Division, were sent in pursuit of the retreating French, skirmishing with the enemy rearguard. In August, volunteers from the 1/52nd were involved in the storming of San Sebastián. The 1/52nd crossed into France on 7 October, when they stormed redoubts above Vera. The 1/52nd also fought in the battles at Nivelle (November 1813), Nive (December 1813) and Orthes (February 1814). During the battle of Orthes, the 52nd led an assault up the ridge under heavy fire, an advance which was later described by Sir Harry Smith as the most majestic he had ever seen.

=== The Hundred Days and end for Napoleon ===
Napoleon abdicated on 6 April 1814, but the news arrived in Wellington's camp too late to prevent the Battle of Toulouse, on 10 April, during which battle the 1/52nd's Lieutenant Whichcote was first into the city.

Over this later period, the 2/52nd, who had left the Peninsula, were bolstered with new recruits and were sent to Holland in 1813–14, as part of Sir Thomas Graham's force which made an unsuccessful attack on Bergen op Zoom in March 1814. Afterwards they spent some time in Belgium before returning home to England.

Once peace agreements had finally been settled – the French Governor of Bayonne being the last, on 26 April – the army left the Peninsula; the infantry marched to Bordeaux for transportation to their new postings. The 1/52nd were returned to England and, on 6 June 1814, stood on the quayside at Dover with their Light Division comrades from the 43rd and 95th as part of the official welcome for the Allied sovereigns' visit to England.

They were later billeted in Hythe and Chatham, where they were joined by the 2/52nd, returned from Belgium, who transferred their effectives to the 1st battalion.

=== Waterloo campaign ===
"The author claims for Lord Seaton and the 52nd the honour of having defeated, single-handed, without the assistance of the 1st British Guards or any other troops, that portion of the Imperial Guard of France, about 10,000 in number, which advanced to make the last attack on the British position."

— Ensign William Leeke
The History of Lord Seaton's Regiment

In January, 1815, the 1/52nd departed Portsmouth for Cork, where they were due to embark for America, where fighting in the War of 1812 continued. Gales prevented sailing, and by the time conditions had improved, news had arrived of Napoleon's escape from Elba. The 1/52nd were sent to Belgium, at the start of the Hundred Days. Napoleon marched swiftly through France to meet the Allies, who had formed two armies, with the Duke of Wellington commanding the Anglo-Allies, and Gebhard Leberecht von Blücher commanding the Prussians.

The 52nd were assigned to Lt-Gen Hill's II Corps, as part of the 2nd Division's 3rd Brigade, under General Adam. As a response to Napoleon's movements, on 15 June, II Corps were posted west and southwest of Brussels, with a cavalry screen. Wellington's forward army engaged the French at Quatre Bras on 16 June, but he later fell back to remain in contact with his Prussian allies, who had retreated following the Battle of Ligny, and took position near the village of Waterloo.

The field at Waterloo was 5.5 km wide, with two parallel ridges running west to east, creating a shallow valley 1.4 km across. The Allies took position on the northern ridge. As the army prepared for battle on 18 June, the 2nd Division were initially held in reserve, placed in the centre left, behind Major-General Cooke's 1st Division. Following the French cavalry's battering of the British squares over the afternoon, Adam's brigade was brought up to reinforce the right. In this position the 52nd endured a heavy bombardment, of which Ensign Leeke of the 52nd reported afterwards "the old officers, who had served during the whole of the Peninsular War, stated that they were never exposed to such a cannonade as the 52nd squares had to undergo on this occasion for 2½ hours from French artillery ½ mile to the front". While the 52nd's squares stood waiting, British artillery fired over their heads.

[After the advance towards the end of the battle] Leeke, who carried the King's colour, found a foot and a half of the pole wet with blood; Holman, ..., had three musket balls through his sword blade, and wore it for many years

— D. H. Parry.

Activity was happening elsewhere on the field, however, and as the battle drew to a close, Napoleon's Middle Guard launched an assault on the British line, to the 52nd's left, and were met by a number of regiments including the 1st Foot Guards, who repulsed the 3rd Chasseurs, but had to themselves retreat when the 4th Chasseurs moved forward to threaten their left. The 52nd, under Sir John Colborne, wheeled to the left, deploying parallel to the French column, and fired volleys against their left flank. William Hay, a Light Dragoon watching from the right, later recalled that "so well-directed a fire was poured in, that down the bank the Frenchmen fell and, I may say, the battle of Waterloo was gained." Seeing the 52nd begin an advance, Wellington reputedly ordered "Go on, Colborne, they won't stand!"; the battalion then advanced diagonally across the field. When this was later followed by a bayonet charge by all of General Adam's 3rd Brigade, the Guard broke, forced into full retreat. Having pursued the French down the escarpment of Mont St Jean, the 52nd crossed the valley floor (that at the start of the battle had separated the armies) and on the other side attacked a square of Old Guard (part of the personal body guard of Napoleon,) that had formed up to the British right of the inn La Belle Alliance and forced it to retreat.

The 1/52nd were the largest battalion at Waterloo, and one of the few British battalions operating at full strength. Of the 1,130 men and officers present, 168 were wounded and 38 killed.

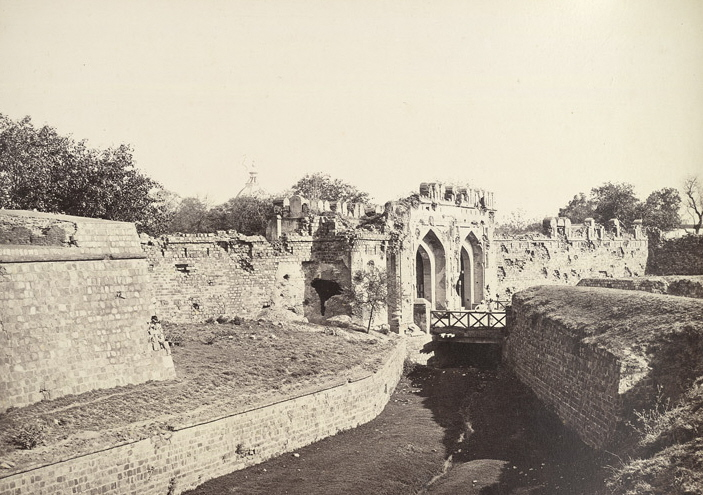
Kashmir Gate, Delhi, showing damage sustained during the 1857 assault. Photo taken in the 1860s

=== Later history ===
The 1st battalion were sent to Paris after Waterloo, and remained stationed in France until 1818. In 1816, the 2nd battalion were disbanded, in line with the other reductions in the army which occurred following the conclusion of the Napoleonic Wars.

Returning to England in 1818, the 52nd were stationed in the Midlands, where they were responsible for domestic peacekeeping and policing under the command of Lt. Col. Charles Rowan, experience which fitted Rowan for his 1829 posting to establish a military-style metropolitan police service under Sir Robert Peel.

In 1821, the regiment were posted to Dublin. Over the following years the 52nd received a number of overseas postings. Between 1823 and 1831, the regiment was stationed at, in turn, New Brunswick, Nova Scotia, Newfoundland, and Prince Edward Island. In early 1842, the 52nd performed garrison duty in Barbados, where British units frequently supplemented the local forces. In 1842, the regiment returned to Canada, and were posted to New Brunswick, Nova Scotia, Prince Edward Island, and Quebec; they left Canada in 1845.

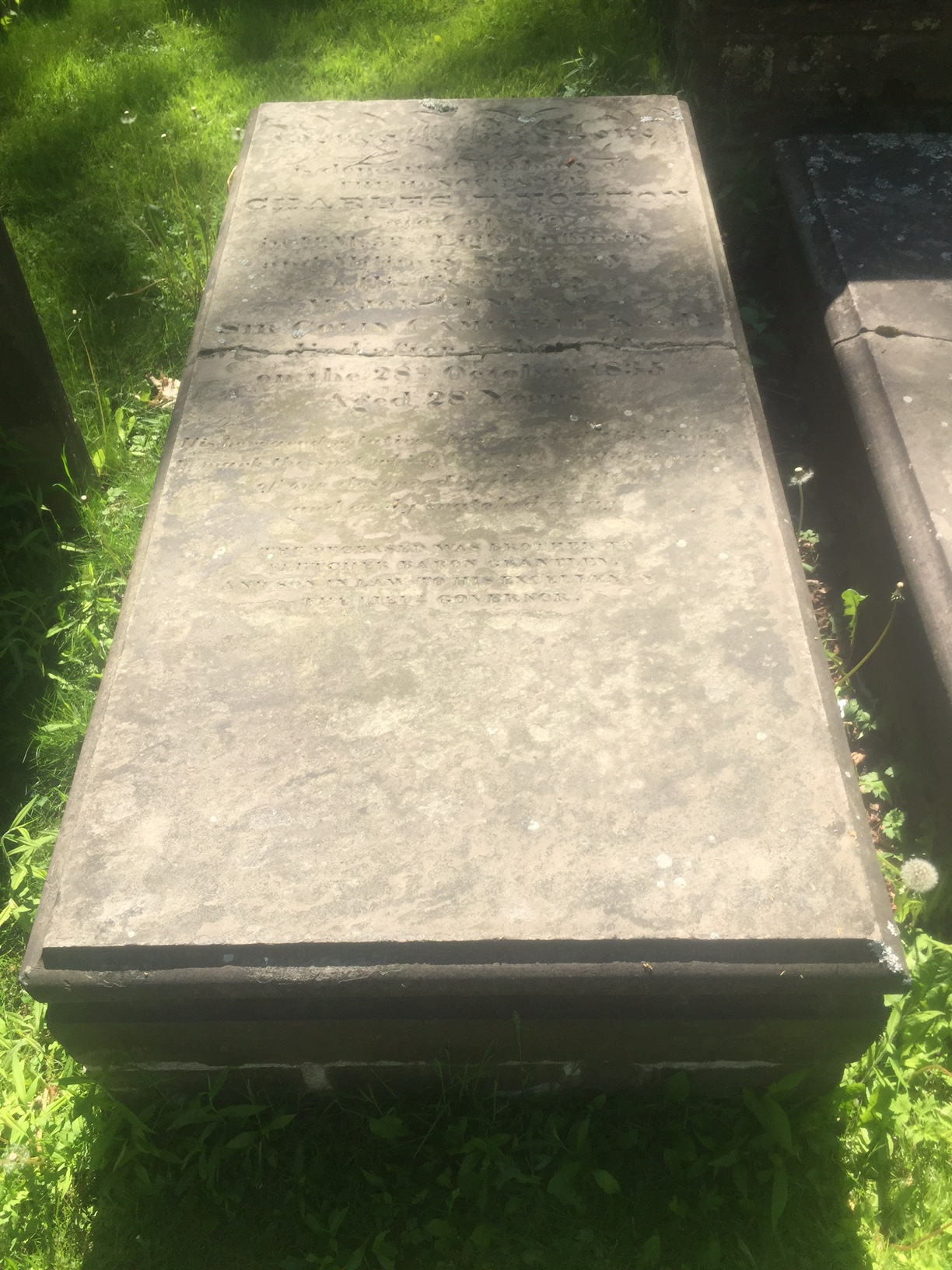
Captain Charles Francis Norton, d. 1835, Old Burying Ground (Halifax, Nova Scotia)

The 52nd later returned to India, arriving in Allahabad in 1853. The regiment found the heat and dust of India gruelling, and Major John Arthur Bayley of the 52nd, who published an account of the regiment's operations in India and described the great clouds of dust which rose over their columns in the march from Allahabad to Umballa in 1853–4; "it was worse in the rear than in the front; so, in order that everyone should have a fair chance, the order of march was changed daily." They were in India during the Indian Rebellion of 1857, where they took part in the Siege of Delhi. Once breaches had been made by the artillery by a bombardment of the walls, an attempt was made on the city on 14 September. The Kashmir Gate was blown by a party of engineers, accompanied by Bugler Robert Hawthorne of the 52nd, who won the Victoria Cross for his bravery. The 52nd led the assault on the blown gate; amidst the action, Lance Corporal Henry Smith also won the Victoria Cross. After six days of heavy fighting, the city was won.

The 52nd remained in India until 1865, when they returned to England. Over the next sixteen years they received postings in Ireland, England, Malta and Gibraltar. As part of the Cardwell Reforms of the 1870s, where single-battalion regiments were linked together to share a single depot and recruiting district in the United Kingdom, the 52nd was linked with the 85th Regiment of Foot (Bucks Volunteers), and assigned to district no. 42 at Cowley Barracks in Oxford. In 1881, due to the Childers Reforms, the 52nd was merged with the 43rd (Monmouthshire) Regiment of Foot, a regiment they had fought alongside as part of the Light Division during many campaigns. The newly combined unit was named the "Oxfordshire Light Infantry" – the 52nd becoming the 2nd Battalion – and in 1908 the Oxfordshire and Buckinghamshire Light Infantry. In 1958, the Ox & Bucks became the 1st Green Jackets (43rd and 52nd), and in 1966 was merged into the Royal Green Jackets. In 2007, the Royal Green Jackets became part of The Rifles.

== Colours and honours ==
Like most British regiments, the 52nd carried flags known as "colours": the First, or "King's Colour", and the Second, or "Regimental Colour". The First had the Union Flag with the Regiment's number in the centre, surrounded by a wreath. Following the presentation of their colours in 1799, the 52nd's King's Colour included the Royal Cipher in the centre, a non-standard addition. The Second was in the colour of the regimental facings (buff, in the 52nd's case) with a small Union Flag in the corner; the regimental number took the centre. The colours were carried into battle for identification, and as a rallying point, in the care of sergeants or ensigns. Attending the colours in battle was dangerous, since they were a target for enemy artillery and assault; due to the symbolic significance of the colours, their loss was a grave issue, and extreme measures were often taken to prevent such dishonour occurring. The skirmishing and forward positions maintained by light infantry frequently made the bearing of colours inconvenient. For this reason, the newly raised 95th Rifles received no colours, but the converted line regiments, such as the 52nd, retained their existing colours. While some light infantry regiments opted not to carry them in the Peninsula, the 52nd and 43rd did.

Battle honours are awarded to a regiment for their performance in certain battles and campaigns, and are displayed on their colours. The 52nd received the following honours: Hindoostan, Vimeiro, Corunna, Bussaco, Fuentes de Oñoro, Ciudad Rodrigo, Badajoz, Salamanca, Vitoria, Nivelle, Nive, Orthes, Toulouse, Peninsula, Waterloo and Delhi 1857.

== Badges and decorations ==
=== Regimental badge ===
The Regimental Badge of the 52nd showed a bugle horn, suspended by cords from a knot, with the number "52" below the tassels. The bugle horn had been the badge of light infantry regiments since 1770, adapted from the Hanoverian Jaegar regiments, and became standard for the newly formed Light Infantry regiments, since it represented the bugle calls used for skirmishing orders instead of the standard line infantry drum. The regimental badge was worn on much of the equipment, including the shakos and belts, and also frequently on turnbacks and officers' shoulder wings.

=== Valiant Stormers ===
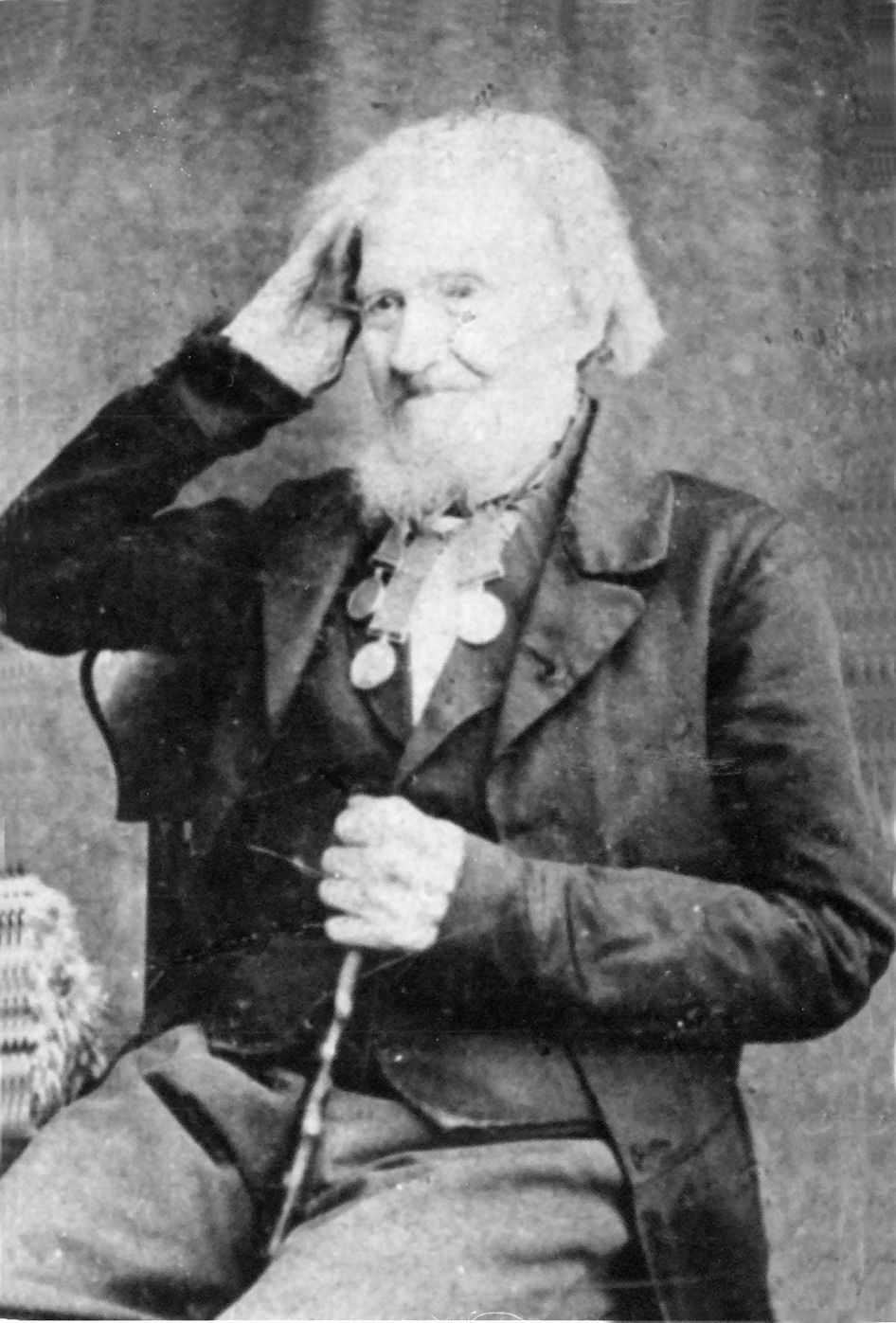
1 January 1870–52nd veteran with his medals-Private John Jack of the 52nd Regiment of Foot, British Army, photographed at Banff, Scotland at the age of 90 wearing his medals, including the stormers medal for volunteering for the leading file of attack at the storming of Ciudad Rodrigo and Waterloo Medal

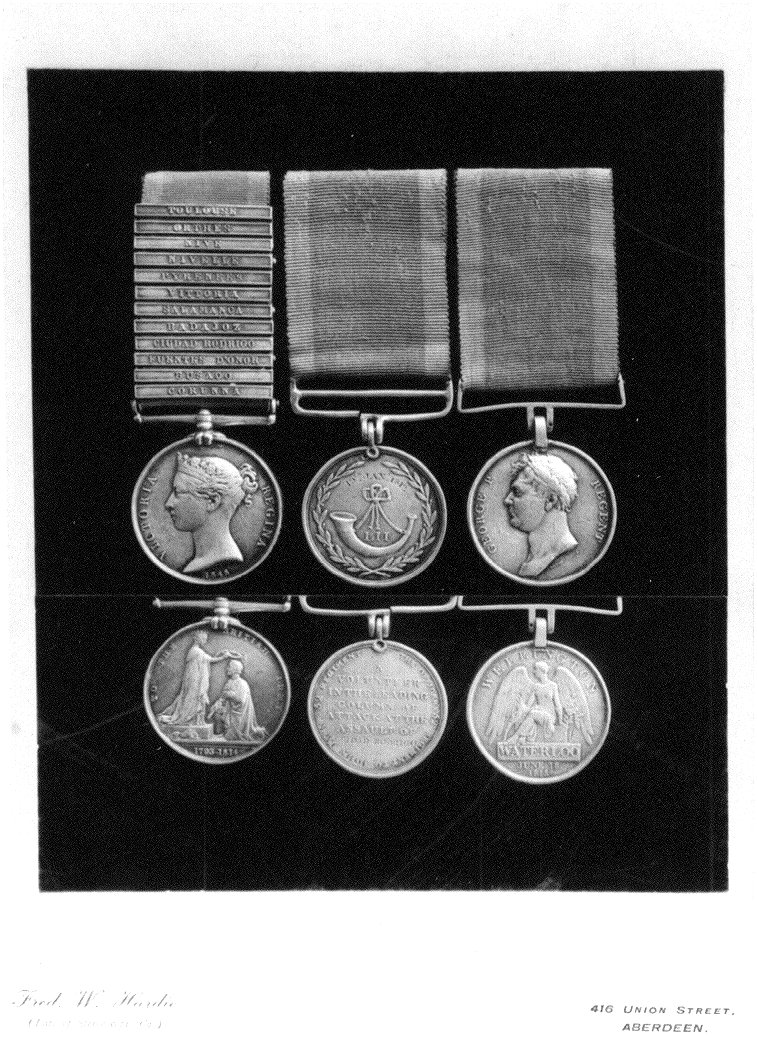
52nd veteran's medals-The medals of Private John Jack of the 52nd Regiment of Foot, British Army, showing (left to right) the Military General Service Medal (MGSM) with clasps for Toulouse, Orthez, Nive, Nivelle, Pyrenees, Vittoria, Salamanca, Badajoz, Ciudad Rodrigo, Fuentes de Oñoro, Bussaco, Corunna; Stormers Medal for volunteering for the leading file of attack at the storming of Ciudad Rodrigo; Waterloo Medal (WM)

During the Peninsular War, the 52nd fulfilled their dual role as line and light infantry by contributing to fortress assault parties. The companies that led the breach assaults were known as the "Forlorn Hope", (from the Dutch "verloren hoop" (lost troop)). It was deemed an act of high honour, since the lead troops faced the greatest danger. The 52nd contributed to the Forlorn Hope at the sieges of Ciudad Rodrigo, Badajoz (1812) and San Sebastián. Officers and sergeants who survived would be very likely be put up for battlefield promotions (although it was not assured) while other ranks would receive laurels from their commander also with the chance of promotion being greatly increased. The 52nd, however, offered its own recognition: those who survived the Forlorn Hope at Ciudad Rodrigo and Badajoz were entitled to wear on their right arm a badge displaying a laurel wreath and the letters "V.S." for "Valiant Stormer". This honour was awarded by the 52nd's commanding officer, and was restricted to the 52nd.

=== Victoria Cross ===
The Victoria Cross (VC) was instituted in 1856 as the British Empire's highest decoration for valour. From that date until the 52nd merged with 43rd in 1881, two soldiers from the 52nd were awarded the Victoria Cross, both at Delhi in 1857: Bugler Robert Hawthorne and Lance Corporal Henry Smith.

Bugler Hawthorne accompanied a party of engineers, led by Lieutenants Home and Salkeld of the Bengal Engineers, who had been ordered to lay a charge and blow the Kashmir Gate, so that entry to the city might be obtained. Once the charges had been detonated, Hawthorne sounded the advance, and then attended to a wounded officer from the explosion party, all the while enduring intense fire from the city's defenders.

Lance Corporal Smith's medal was won during the following assault on the blown gate, when he "most gallantly carried away a wounded comrade under a heavy fire of grape and musketry, in the Chandnee Chouk of the city of Delhi, on the morning of the assault".

Hawthorne and Henry Smith's VC medals are on display at the Royal Green Jackets (Rifles) Museum in Winchester. Three others from the explosion party were awarded VCs that day: Sgt Smith, Lt. Home and Lt. Salkeld, who was the first posthumous recipient of the VC.

== Colonels ==
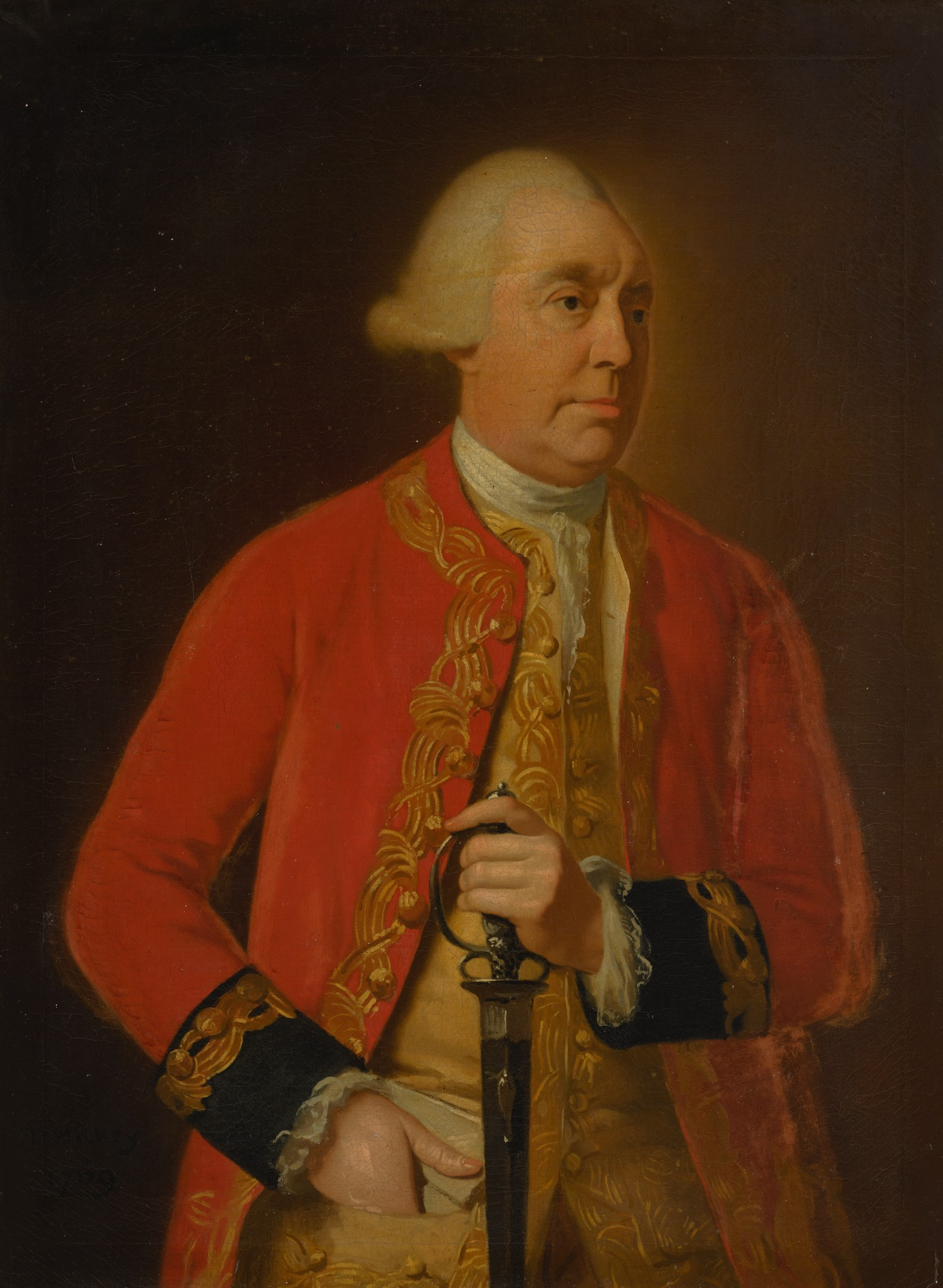
Portrait of Major General Edward Sandford

Colonels of the regiment were:

=== The 54th Regiment of Foot – (1755) ===
- 1755–1758: Maj-Gen. Hedworth Lambton

=== The 52nd Regiment of Foot – (1756) ===
- 1758–1760: Lt-Gen Edward Sandford
- 1760–1762: Gen Sir John Sebright, 6th Baronet
- 1762–1777: Lt-Gen Sir John Clavering
- 1778–1801: Gen Cyrus Trapaud

=== The 52nd (Oxfordshire) Regiment of Foot – (1782) ===
- 1801–1809: Lt-Gen Sir John Moore KB

=== The 52nd (Oxfordshire) Regiment of Foot, Light Infantry – (1803) ===
- 1809–1822: Lt-Gen Sir Hildebrand Oakes, 1st Baronet GCB
- 1822–1839: Gen Sir George Walker, 1st Baronet
- 1839–1844: Lt-Gen Sir Thomas Arbuthnot
- 1844–1847: Lt-Gen Sir Edward Gibbs
- 1847–1861: Gen Sir Archibald Maclaine
- 1861–1879: F.M. Sir William Rowan, GCB
- 1879–1881: Gen John Leslie Dennis, CB

== Uniform and equipment ==
Throughout most of the regiment's life, the 52nd Foot wore traditional British Army red coats, with buff facings. During the American wars, the coat was long tailed, with buff facings, buff waistcoat and breeches. The grenadier company wore a bearskin hat with the King's Crest and the regimental number. Officers wore crimson sash, gorget and silver epaulettes.

When becoming a light infantry regiment in 1803, the uniform accordingly changed. Light infantry dress has its origins in the American War of Independence, when uniforms were altered to allow ease in the field. "Wings", similar to those worn by grenadiers, were added to the shoulders and lacing was dispensed with, to make the quick removal of coats possible. At that time, the irregular light infantry also sought less conspicuous dress than the traditional red coat. However, conservatism returned with the new regular light infantry; while the 95th Rifles were permitted to retain the green clothing used by the German regiments, the seconded line regiments were required to retain the red coat, which remained an impediment to their skirmishing duties.

Thus, throughout the Napoleonic wars, the 52nd foot continued to wear red uniforms with buff facings. The officers had silver lace, while the other ranks' lace was worn in pairs, red with orange stripes (according to 1802 regulations); in 1812 a commentator described the lace as red with two blue stripes. Light infantry officers wore short jackets, rather than the tailed coats of the other line regiments, with white piping, silver buttons, and silver and scarlet shoulder wings. The uniform was completed with a crimson sash; to match the buff facings and turn-backs, the officers generally wore buff breeches, or grey overalls. Field officers of the 52nd wore silver epaulettes, with regimental badge, overtop the light infantry wings, to designate rank. An 1810 order stipulated these be badged with a star (for majors), a crown (lieutenant colonels) or star and crown (colonels). Light infantry also commonly wore a narrow waist belt instead of the customary shoulder belt. The 52nd did not adopt the "Belgic cap" but retained the stovepipe shako throughout the Napoleonic period; it was adorned with the brass bugle badge and green plumes of the light infantry. In the 52nd, officers' plumes were made from horsehair. Officers generally carried a stirrup-hilted sabre.

Officers were responsible for providing (and paying for) their own uniforms; consequently, variable style and decoration was present, according to the officer's private means. Equipment could consume a significant portion of an officer's pay; during the Napoleonic era, the 52nd's plain regimental sabre, for example, cost 4 guineas, approximately 16 days' pay for an ensign.

The red coat remained standard uniform for the British Army until khaki was introduced as standard in 1885, although some allowances were made for colonial conditions, with the use of lighter materials, and slight change of design. However, the uniform and equipment remained quite restrictive, particularly in colonial warfare. In 1841, the light bob's situation was compared unfavourably with his enemy's light marching order: "Buckle him up in a tight red jacket, when the thermometer is about 80°; place across his breast two buff-leather belts, about a quarter of an inch in thickness, and each what the milliners call a nail in breadth; hang to one of them a cartouche-box containing sixty rounds of ball cartridges, each of these about above an ounce in weight; strap across his shoulders a square well-packed wallet, containing four shirts, with or without frills, and other notions; plant a cap on his head which in point of weight is equal to an iron pot; then place over his shoulder a musket and bayonet weighing a stone; with three days' provisions in his haversack, and a couple of quarts of liquid in a canteen."

While no official service uniform was developed for the tropics, during the Mutiny in India in 1857, many of the regiments fought in their undress uniform (white drill), rather than the standard uniform. The 52nd were the first regiment to dye their white uniforms khaki for use in the field. This early khaki was a grey colour. For most purposes, they discarded their coats and, adopting the Indian traditions, wore their shirts out, rather than tucked in; shirts were also dyed. The 52nd also developed turbans to wear over their standard-issue forage caps. Following the mutiny, regiments returned to the standard red clothing.

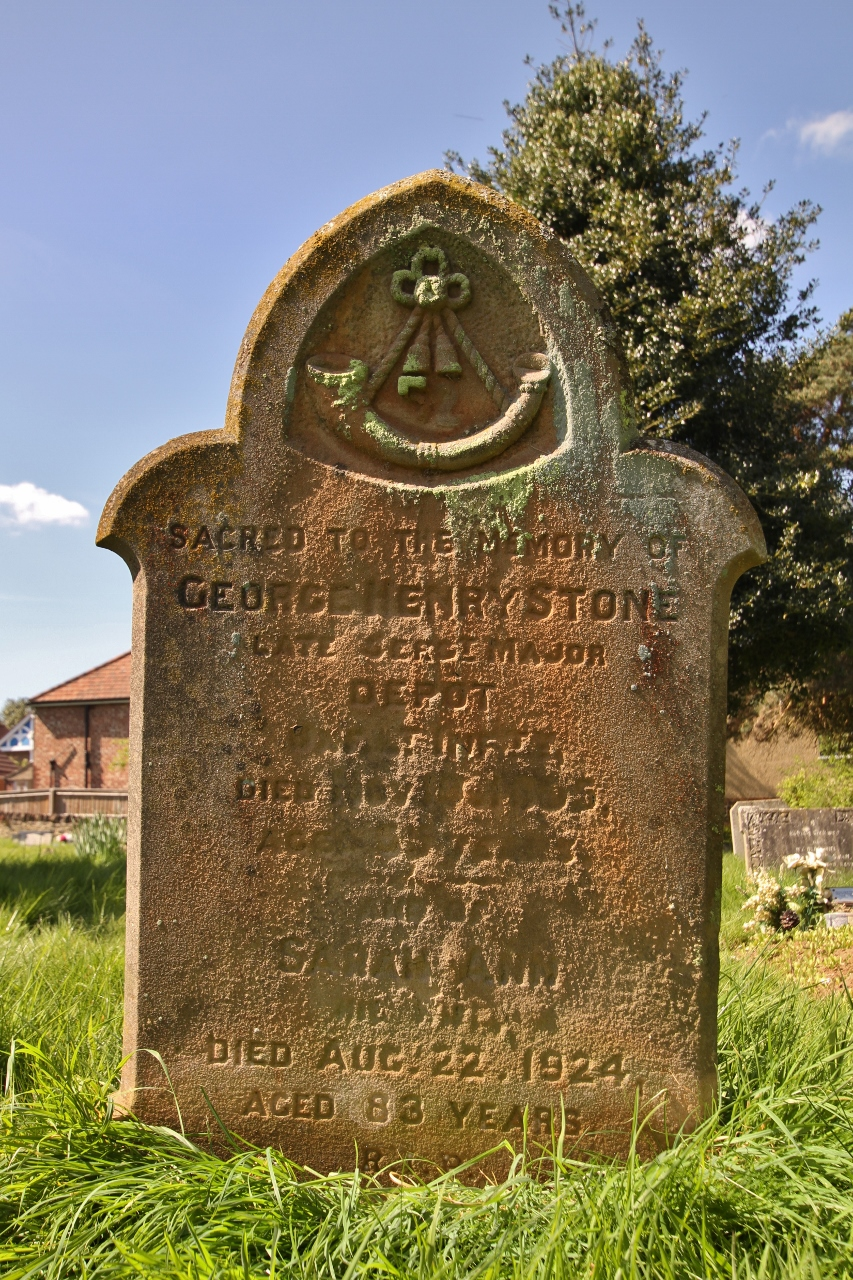
Headstone of Depot Sergeant Major George Stone at Cowley Barracks, Oxfordshire light Infantry, St James' parish churchyard, Cowley, Oxfordshire. (An eroded trace of the number "52" is visible in the regimental badge carved at the top of the stone.)

== Legacy ==
Despite its continual merging with other units from 1881, the legacy of the 52nd remains. Many of the 52nd's battle honours are represented on the Belt Badge of The Rifles (being a rifle regiment, The Rifles do not carry colours). Various museums record the actions of the 52nd and hold collections of artifacts and memorabilia, including the Royal Green Jackets (Rifles) Museum, and the Soldiers of Oxfordshire Museum.

Some officers of the 52nd recorded their experiences in the regiment. One of the most notable was the Reverend William Leeke who, as a young ensign, carried the Regimental Colours at Waterloo. He believed that the actions taken by Sir John Colborne (Lord Seaton) and the 52nd to defeat the Imperial Guard at the close of the battle had been unjustly overlooked in official dispatches and histories, and wrote his memoirs so that "the truth, with regard to what we knew the 52nd had achieved at Waterloo, [should] see the light". In 1866 his two-volume work The History of Lord Seaton's Regiment, (the 52nd Light Infantry) at the Battle of Waterloo was published, and has served as a primary source for most Waterloo historians since. Also to publish memoirs, although less successfully, was Reginald Wilberforce, grandson of slavery abolitionist William Wilberforce, who wrote, in 1894, An Unrecorded Chapter of the Indian Mutiny; on publication, the book was criticised by his fellow officers of the 52nd for its inaccuracy.

== See also ==
- Officers of the 52nd Foot
- Soldiers of the 52nd Foot
- British Army during the Napoleonic Wars
