= Henry Curling (novelist) =

British novelist (1803–1864)

Henry Curling (1803 – 10 February 1864, Kensington) was a novelist and captain in the 52nd Regiment of Foot, a light infantry unit in the British Army. Curling's works include The Soldier of Fortune, 1843; Shakespeare, a Romance, 1848; and Recollections of Rifleman Harris, 1848.

== Recollections of Rifleman Harris ==
Many common foot soldiers during the period 1803–1815 were unable to create an account of events they encountered because of their illiteracy. Recollections of Rifleman Harris provides an account of Benjamin Randell Harris, a common soldier in the British army. Harris was part of the 95th Rifles Regiment, a highly regarded regiment during the Peninsular War and famous for their green jackets.

Harris was illiterate and would not have been able to produce his memoir without the help and convincing of Curling. Curling tracked Harris down while residing in London as a cobbler after his time in the British army. Harris was forced back into the workforce because of a disease, believed to be malaria. He contracted on the Walcheren expedition in 1809 that forced him out of the military as unfit to serve, costing Harris his pension.

Curling, as mentioned before, contributed as a novelist with other works until his death at his home in London in 1864.
