= John Parslow (British Army officer) =

British Army general

General John Parslow
- Died: 15 November 1786; Bath, Somerset
- Military career
- Allegiance: Great Britain
- Branch: British Army
- Rank: General
- Conflicts: Seven Years' War

General John Parslow (died 15 November 1786) was a British Army general of the 18th century.

== Military career ==
Parslow served as a junior officer with the 1st Regiment of Foot Guards. He became colonel of the 70th (Glasgow Lowland) Regiment of Foot in April 1758, colonel of the 54th Regiment of Foot in September 1760 and colonel of the 30th Regiment of Foot in April 1770. He was promoted to full general on 20 November 1782.

He was Governor of Gibraltar from 1761 to 1762.

== Family life ==
John Parslow married Margaret Hillersden, the daughter of the Whig MP for Bedford, William Hillersden, and his wife Elizabeth. Parslow's daughter Charlotte predeceased him on 11 June 1786. Parslow himself died at the town of Bath on 15 November 1786.

Military offices
Preceded by New post	Colonel of the 70th (Glasgow Lowland) Regiment of Foot; 1758–1760	Succeeded by Cyrus Trapaud
Preceded by John Grey	Colonel of the 54th Regiment of Foot; 1760–1770	Succeeded by Mariscoe Frederick
Preceded by John Campbell, 4th Earl of Loudoun	Colonel of the 30th Regiment of Foot; 1770–1786	Succeeded by William Roy
