= John Smith (sergeant) =

Recipient of the Victoria Cross (1914–1864)

- Born: February 1814; Ticknall, Derbyshire
- Died: 26 June 1864 (aged 50); Jullundur, British India
- Burial place: Artillery Cemetery, Jullundur
- Military career
- Allegiance: United Kingdom
- Branch: Bengal Army
- Rank: Ensign
- Units: Bengal Sappers and Miners
- Conflicts: First Anglo-Afghan War: Battle of Jellalabad; Kabul Expedition (1842); First Anglo-Sikh War Indian Mutiny
- Awards: Victoria Cross

John Smith (February 1814 – 26 June 1864) was an English recipient of the Victoria Cross, the highest and most prestigious award for gallantry in the face of the enemy that can be awarded to British and Commonwealth forces. Born in Derbyshire in the United Kingdom, Smith enlisted in the army of the East India Company at the age of 23. Posted to India in 1839, Smith served through various campaigns, earning the Victoria Cross in 1857 at the Siege of Delhi. Smith died from dysentery in 1864.

== Life and career ==
Smith was born in Ashby Road, Ticknall, Derbyshire, in February 1814. After working as a cordwainer like his father and uncle, Smith enlisted with the private army of the East India Company in London on 3 October 1837. Following his training at the East India Company's depot in Chatham, Smith embarked for India. Arriving on 2 August 1839 Smith was posted to the Bengal Sappers and Miners, subsequently arriving at the headquarters in Delhi then joining the 3rd Company of the Bengal Sappers and Miners. Smith was promoted to Sergeant in 1840.

Smith, then with the 5th Company of the Bengal Sappers and Miners in November 1841, served in a force under Brigadier Wild, taking part in the advance on Ali Masjid in the Khyber Pass. Smith then served throughout the 1842 campaign in Afghanistan, taking part in the successful storming of the Khyber Pass; the occupation of Jelalabad and the occupation of Kabul. Smith later rejoined the Headquarters of the Bengal Sappers and Miners at Delhi, and was shortly afterwards transferred to 7th Company, with whom he served in the later part of the Sutlej campaign. Smith was present at the battle of Sobraon and was awarded a medal for this. Posted to the 3rd Company, Smith served through the Punjab campaign in the Second Anglo-Sikh War, being present at the siege and capture of Multan and battle of Gujrat. For this service Smith was awarded the Punjab Medal with two clasps.

Smith was posted in 1851 to work with the Superintending Engineer of the Punjab, in the Department of Public Works, as an Acting Assistant Overseer attached to the Mian Mir Division, eventually becoming an Assistant Overseer in 1854. Smith was ordered to return to his regiment in 1856, and due to an error in the carrying out of this order Smith was mistakenly posted, at a reduced rank of Gunner, to the 3rd Company of the 4th Battalion of Bengal Artillery. Smith successfully protested against the order, leading to its rescinding and Smith being sent back to the Bengal Sappers and Miners at his former rank of Sergeant. Smith remained at the depot in Rurki until the outbreak of the Indian Mutiny in May 1857 when the a force from the Bengal Sappers and Miners were ordered to the immediate aid of the station at Meerut. The arrival of this force at Meerut on 13 May 1857 was met with hostility, and the Meerut authorities demanded that the Bengal Sappers and Miners be disarmed, leading to the mutiny of a large number of the force (killing their commanding officer in the process) which then left to join the rebels at Delhi, leaving 45 Non-commissioned Officers and Privates, and 124 loyal Indian sappers. After two weeks at Meerut, this group was ordered to join the Delhi Field Force, with Smith serving in operations through the siege.

== Victoria Cross ==
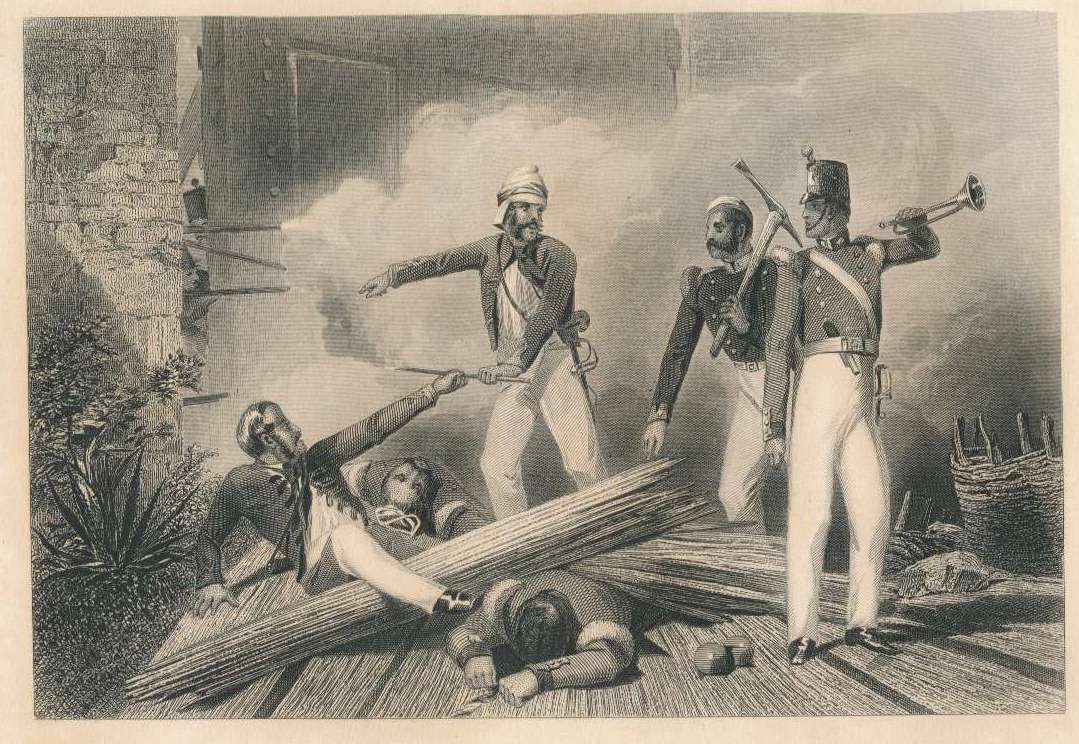
Blowing up of the Cashmere Gate at Delhi, 14 Sept. 1857, steel engraving

Smith was 43 years old, and a sergeant in the Bengal Sappers and Miners, Bengal Army during the Indian Mutiny when the following deed took place for which he was awarded the VC. On 14 September 1857 at Delhi, British India, Sergeant Smith with two lieutenants (Duncan Charles Home and Philip Salkeld) and Bugler Robert Hawthorne showed conspicuous gallantry in the blowing in the Kashmir Gate in broad daylight under heavy fire. His citation reads:

For conspicuous gallantry, in conjunction with Lieutenants Home and Salkeld, in the performance of the desperate duty of blowing in the Cashmere Gate of the fortress of Delhi in broad daylight, under a heavy and destructive fire of musketry, on the morning of 14 September 1857, preparatory to the assault.

(General Order of Major-General Sir Archdale Wilson, Bart., K.C.B., dated "Head Quarters, Delhi City, September 21, 1857.")

== Later career ==
Smith spent 1858 engaged in operations in Oudh and was awarded the Indian Mutiny Medal with "Delhi" clasp. In July 1859 Smith was appointed Sub-Conductor and acting Barrack Master for Jullundur and Phillour. Smith was promoted to Ensign on 17 March 1860, and later served as Barrack Master at Peshawar, Subathu and Darjeeling, returning in January 1864 to general duties at Amballa.

While on leave in Jullundur, Smith contracted dysentery there and died on 26 June 1864, following which he was buried in the Artillery Cemetery in Jullundur. The location of Smith's Victoria Cross medal is unknown.

A memorial plaque commemorating Smith was placed on the wall of Ticknall Village Hall in 2014.
