= Annie Jane =

1853 shipwreck off Vatersay, Outer Hebrides

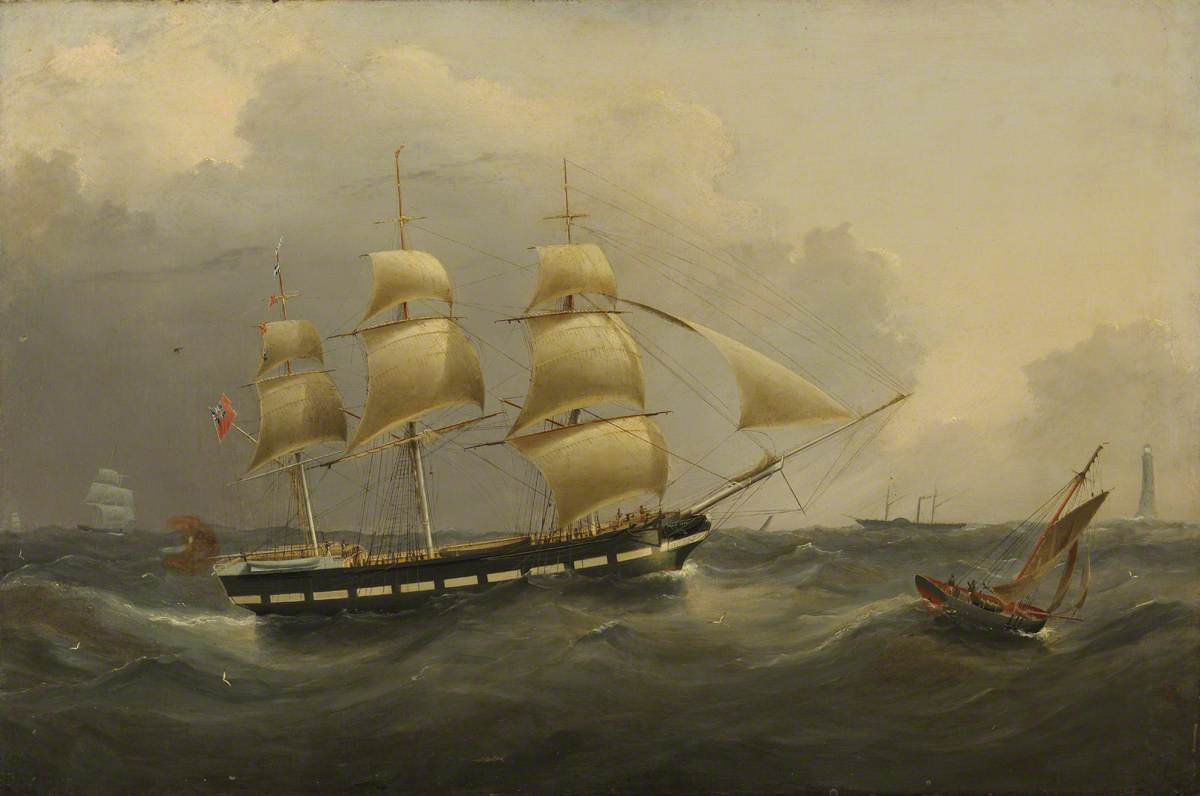
The Ship Annie Jane by Joseph Heard, c. 1853

Annie Jane was a ship carrying 450 people that sank on 28 September 1853 en route from Liverpool to Montreal, Canada, after breaking up on rocks in a storm off Vatersay in the Outer Hebrides, while attempting to reach the island of Barra. Three hundred fifty passengers died in the sinking, while over 100 survivors floated to shore on pieces of wreckage.

== History ==
The owner of Annie Jane was Thomas Holderness, who resided in Liverpool. Many of the ship's passengers were Irish and Scottish. The ship left Liverpool on August 18, 1853. Due to poor weather which damaged two of the ship's topmasts, Annie Jane returned to Liverpool, leaving once more on September 9. Bad weather continued during its second attempt, and despite making repairs to the ship at sea, many passengers wished to return to Liverpool again. The captain, William Mason, initially turned the ship back towards Liverpool, but changed course for Canada again the next day. Mason threatened to shoot anyone who attempted to reverse his decision, having allegedly shouted "To Quebec or the bottom!" After suffering severe damage to its topsail on the 21st, Annie Jane began to drift, and by the 28th was near Barra. While attempting to reach a bay on Barra to evade a storm, Annie Jane struck ground near Vatersay. In total 350 people died, out of around 450 passengers. It is possible the death toll was higher as children were not listed on the ship. One hundred and two passengers survived by floating to shore on pieces of the ship, who were later cared for by the residents of Vatersay before they could return to the mainland. The ship's sinking was ruled to have been due to excess cargo, which, combined with poor stowage, had led the ship to roll excessively.

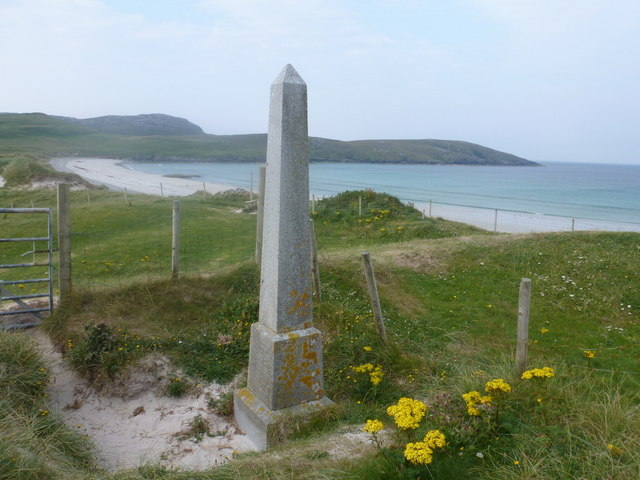
Memorial to the victims

As residents of the islands lacked the resources to properly handle the large numbers of dead passengers, over 250 were buried in two mass graves, located on a set of beach dunes. The incident, alongside other maritime accidents around the same time period, prompted authorities to recommend the usage of azimuth compasses during voyage. The bay at Vatersay where many of the bodies washed ashore is now the site of a memorial.
