= John Arthur Bayley =

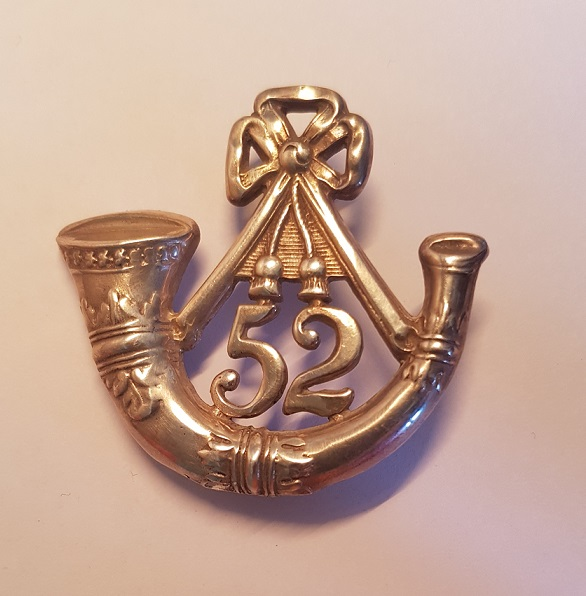
- Cap badge of the 52nd (Oxfordshire) Regiment of Foot
- Born: 13 July 1831; Bedford Square, London, England
- Died: 4 February 1903 (aged 71); Paddington, London, England
- Burial place: London
- Relatives: Wife Elizabeth Sterling of Belfast, no children.
- Military career
- Allegiance: United Kingdom; British East India Company
- Branch: British Army/Infantry
- Rank: Major
- Unit: 52nd (Oxfordshire) Regiment of Foot
- Conflicts: Indian Mutiny and the Siege of Delhi
- Awards: Indian Mutiny Medal

John Arthur Bayley (13 July 1831 – 4 February 1903) was a British Army infantry officer and grandson of a baronet, who wrote a personal account of his time as an officer on campaign in India. His regiment the 52nd Regiment of Foot took part in quelling the Indian Mutiny and specifically were part of a British assault force that forced a breach at the Kashmir Gate during the Siege of Delhi.

== Background and personal life ==
John Bayley was born in Bedford Square London, England on 13 July 1831, the son of a judge of the Westminster County Court. He married Elizabeth Sterling of Belfast on 5 June 1853, they had no children. Little is known about what John Bayley's occupation was after he retired from the Army. He died on 4 February 1903 in the Paddington area of London, England.

== School years ==
John Bayley's memoirs records that from 1839 he attended schools in Rottingdean, Sevenoaks and Tonbridge. In January 1845 he attended Eton College, leaving the college in Easter 1849 and preparing for his pre-commission army exams. He recorded that these were "jolly days" at Eton. He spent some time in Germany studying German and military affairs in Hanover. He passed his commissioning exams at Sandhurst in February 1851.

== Military career ==
According to his own memoirs:

- On 10 March 1851 he was "gazetted to an ensigncy on in the 52nd Light Infantry" and later presented at Court by Lord Hardinge.
- Bayley eventually joined his regiment on 10 May 1851. The 52nd was at the time made up of 10 companies and based in Limerick. Initially Bayley was a subaltern in Capt Cumming's company but in June 1851 he is appointed to Captain Dennison's company and sent on detachment to Cahir.
- On 17 December 1852 he is promoted to Lieutenant (by Purchase).
- On 5 October 1853 Bayley landed with his regiment in Bengal.
- On 10 August 1854 he was listed as a Lieutenant with the regiment based in Subathoo, India.
- On 7 November 1856 he was listed as promoted to Captain.
- On 19 January 1858 he was promoted from Captain to Brevet Major in the 52nd Foot.
- According to his own memoirs Major Bayley retired from the Army after extended sick leave on 18 April 1859.

== Role in the Indian Mutiny ==
According to John Bayley's memoirs, much of his regiment's early service in India was fairly uneventful, and he spent time in a number of garrison and detachment locations. In January 1856, his unit was ordered to march from its garrison in Meerut to join a force at Lucknow; this force was being assembled to annex one of the last remaining independent provinces in India, Oudh. The Nawab Wajid Ali Shah was deposed in February 1856 and the British East India Company absorbed the province.

On 27 December 1856 Bayley and his regiment leave their quarters at Lucknow and marched for Sealkote passing Agra on their way, arriving at their new station on 18 March 1857. Bayley recorded the beginnings of the Sepoy Mutiny and it was clear that the British regiments were not able to adequately track the beginnings of the revolt or its causes. On 5 June 1857 the regiment moved to Lahore at a time when native regiments were being disarmed and dismissed from East India Company service, and tensions were growing. He even witnessed a number of executions of mutineers and saw the effects on native regiment officers, who still trusted their men.

The 52nd of Foot were part of a 'flying column' commanded by Brigadier John Nicholson who suspected correctly that most of the native regiments in the vicinity of his command were planning to revolt and attack the European units. The regiment was commanded by Lieutenant Colonel George Campbell who was one of the most experienced officers of the column should have been made brigadier in charge. At this stage of the Regiment march toward Delhi they were camped at Amritsar.

On the day of the attack against the Kashmir Gate Colonel George Campbell had arranged for native Bengal Engineers, commanded by Lieutenant Duncan Home, to place explosives next to the gate, a very risky undertaking. The 52nd Regiment gave covering fire during this combat engineering task, but the Bengal Engineers were very exposed to fire from the rebels inside the city walls and several of the sappers were killed. However, the engineers succeeded in blowing a hole in the gate. The 52nd were able to force their way through the gate and on into the city. Captain Bayley was part of the storming party and during the attack was wounded in the arm, he fought on with his regiment into the city. He was eventually recovered to a field hospital and his wound treated successfully. He was one of the lucky ones of the regiment as casualties during the assault on the city through the Kashmir Gate were high:

- 22 killed (including one officer)
- 62 wounded (including Bayley, his commanding officer George Campbell and another officer)

Out of a 52nd assault contingent of 240.

Brigadier Nicholson would be mortally wounded in the assault on the Kabul Gate.

Historian John William Kaye wrote a history of the mutiny published in parts from 1864 to 1876 which claimed that the 52nd was hesitant to attack after the explosives blew a hole in the Kashmir Gate. In 1876, Bayley wrote a pamphlet countering that claim, citing the bugler and numerous officers present and claiming that the 52nd were at the gate within a minute of the bugler sounding the attack.

== Gallery ==
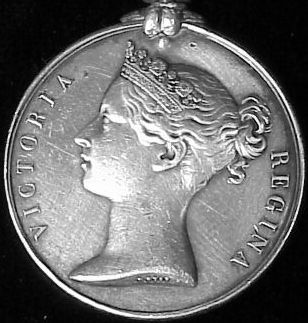
“The Indian Mutiny Medal”

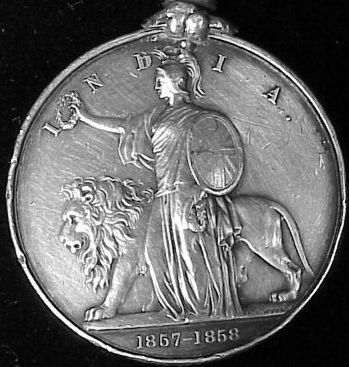
“The Indian Mutiny Medal (Reverse Side)”

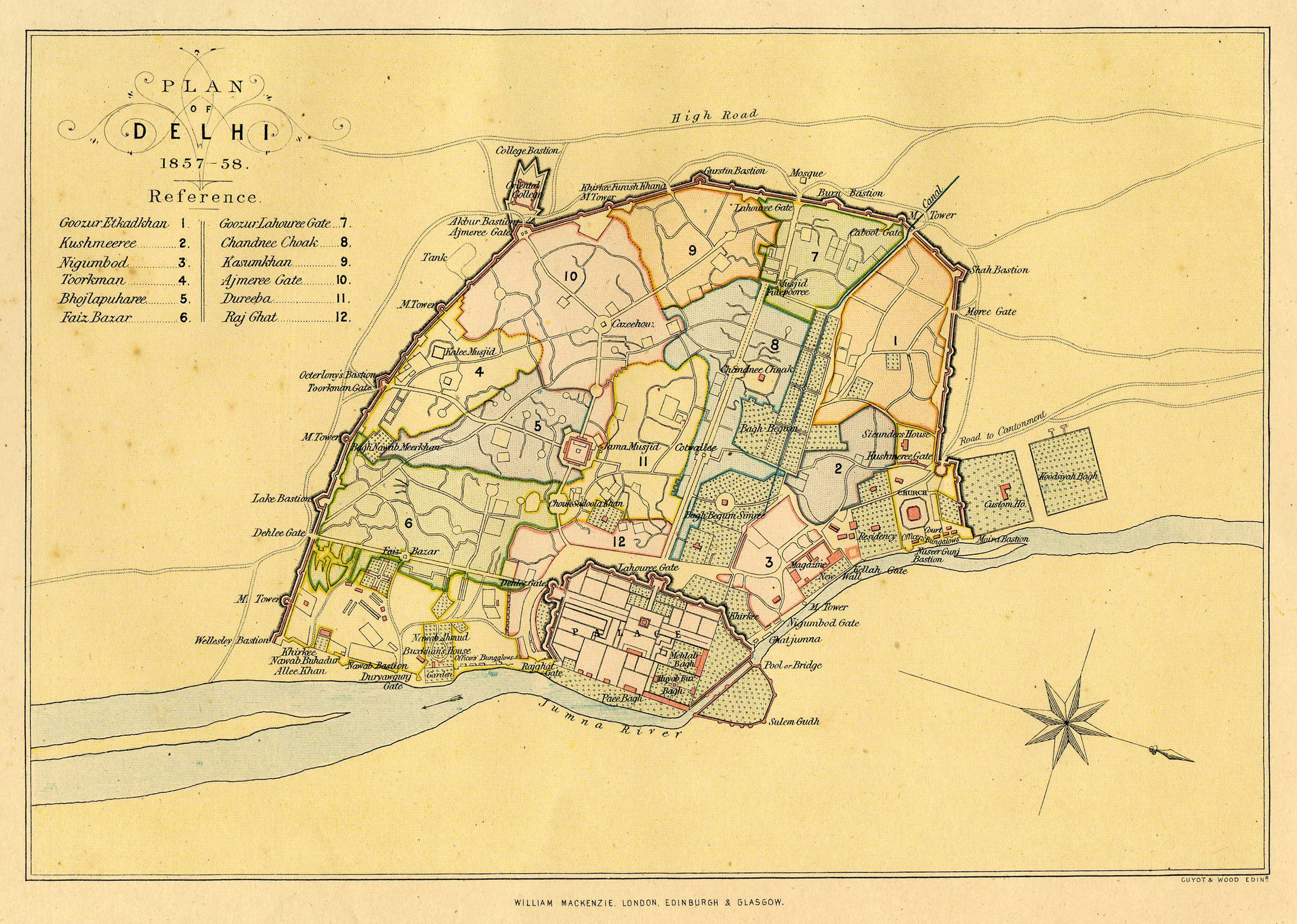
"A map of Delhi before the siege of 1857"

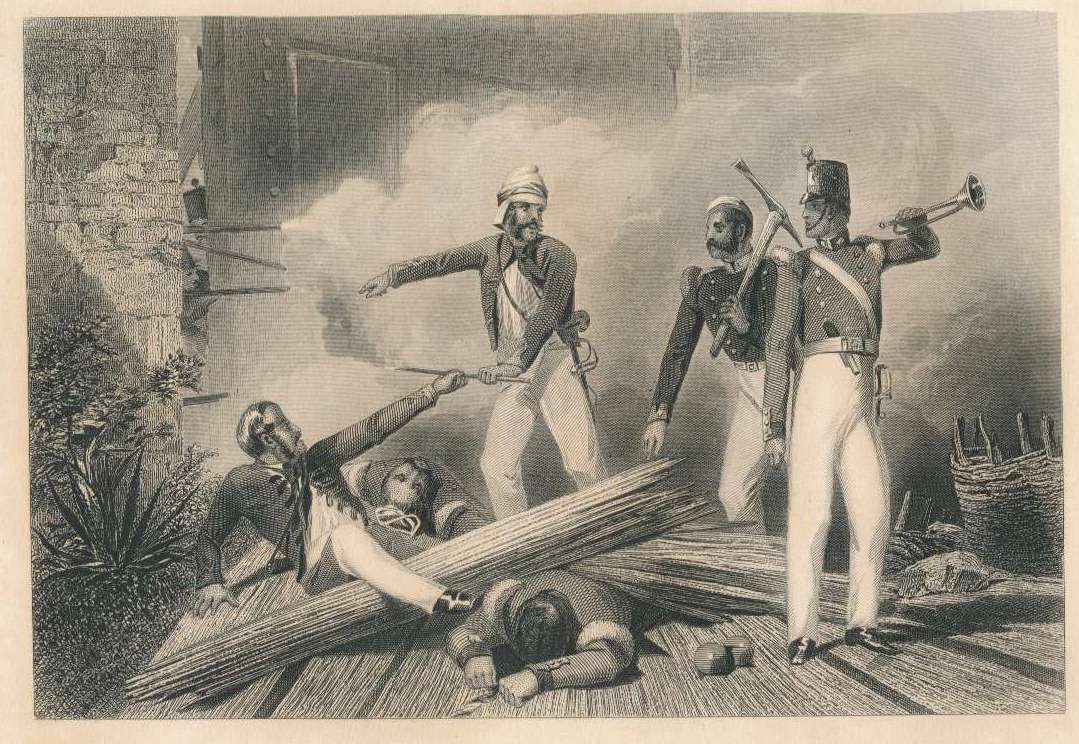
"Blowing up of the Kashmir Gate on 14 September 1857"

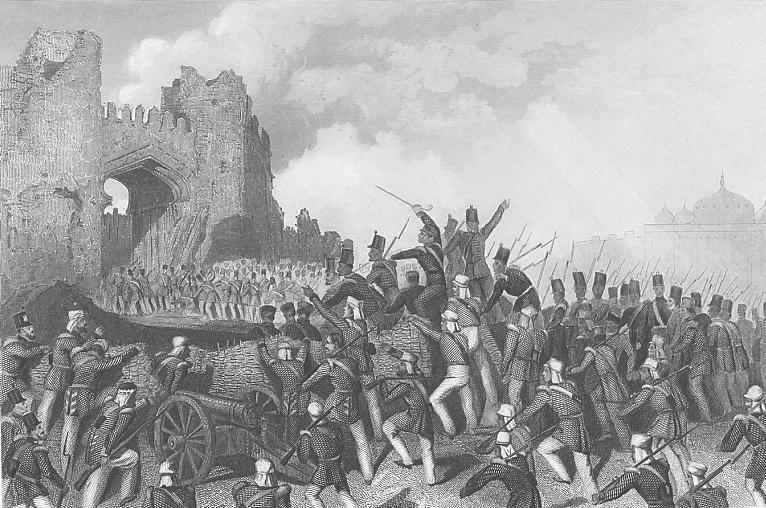
"Assault on the Kashmir Gate, 14 September 1857"

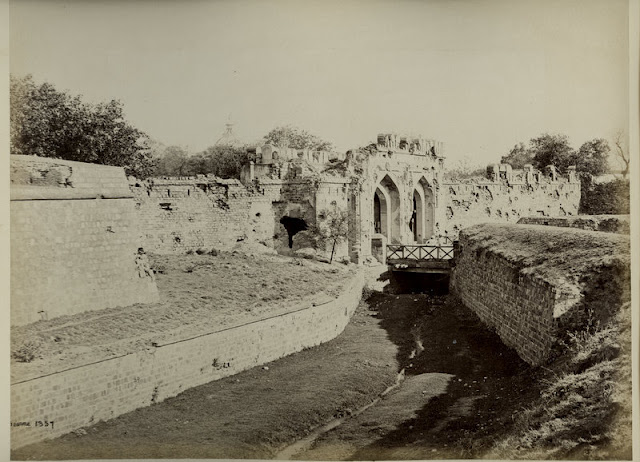
"The damaged Kashmir Gate photographed after the siege in 1857"

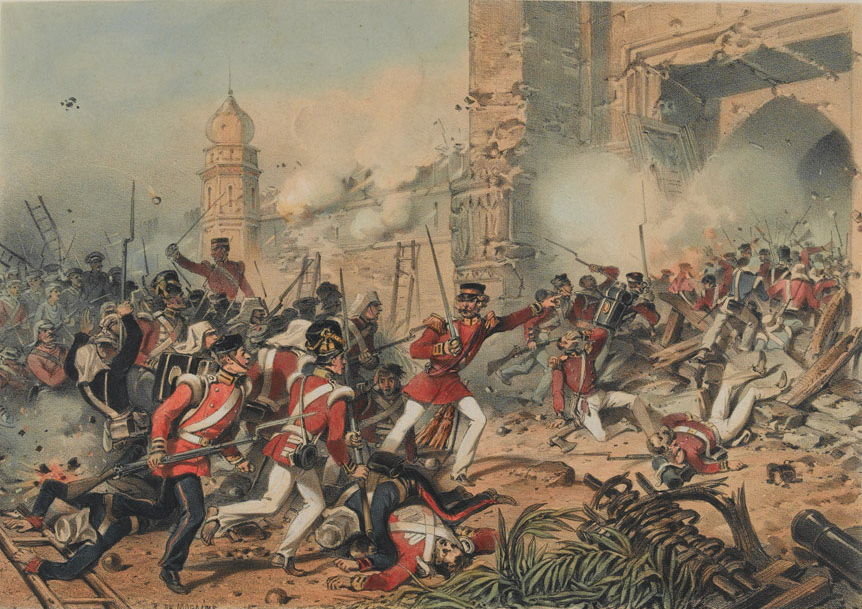
"The Capture of Delhi in 1857"

== Bibliography ==
- Bayley, John Arthur (1875). Reminiscences of School and Army Life, 1839 to 1859. London: Originally self-published. ISBN 9781144252784.
- Bayley, John Arthur (1876). The Assault of Delhi. London: William Ridgway
