= Henry Smith (VC) =

Recipient of the Victoria Cross

- Born: c. 1825; Thames Ditton, Surrey
- Died: 18 August 1862 (aged 36–37); Gwalior, British India
- Burial place: Gwalior Cemetery
- Military career
- Allegiance: United Kingdom
- Branch: British Army
- Rank: Sergeant
- Units: 52nd Regiment of Foot
- Conflicts: Indian Mutiny
- Awards: Victoria Cross

Henry Smith VC (c. 1825 – 18 August 1862) was an English recipient of the Victoria Cross, the highest and most prestigious award for gallantry in the face of the enemy that can be awarded to British and Commonwealth forces.

== Details ==
Smith was about 32 years old, and a lance corporal in the 52nd (Oxfordshire) Regiment of Foot (later the Oxfordshire and Buckinghamshire Light Infantry), British Army during the Indian Mutiny when the following deed took place on 14 September 1857 at Delhi, India for which he was awarded the VC:

Lance-Corporal Smith most gallantly carried away a wounded comrade under a heavy fire of grape and musketry on the Chaundee Chouck, in the city of Delhi, on the morning of the assault on the 14th September, 1857. (General Order of Major-General Sir Archdale Wilson, Bart., K.C.B., dated Head Quarters, Delhi City, 21 September 1857.)

== Further information ==
He later achieved the rank of sergeant, and died of cholera while serving in India. He was buried in a mass grave.

== The medal ==
His Victoria Cross is displayed at the Royal Green Jackets (Rifles) Museum, Winchester, England.
