= Robert Hawthorne =

Recipient of the Victoria Cross

- Born: 12 July 1823; Maghera, County Londonderry
- Died: 2 February 1879 (aged 55); Manchester, Lancashire
- Burial place: Ardwick Cemetery, Manchester
- Military career
- Allegiance: United Kingdom of Great Britain and Ireland
- Branch: British Army
- Rank: Bugler
- Unit: 52nd Regiment of Foot
- Conflicts: Indian Mutiny
- Awards: Victoria Cross

Robert Hawthorne (also spelled Hawthorn) VC (12 July 1823 – 2 February 1879) was a British Army soldier born in Maghera, County Londonderry, Ireland, in 1823, when Ireland was part of the United Kingdom of Great Britain and Ireland. He was awarded the Victoria Cross (VC), the highest and most prestigious award for gallantry in the face of the enemy that can be awarded to British and Commonwealth forces.

== Early life ==
Hawthorne was the son of Robert and Elizabeth Hawthorn. When he was born in 1823, his father was a private in the 52nd (Oxfordshire) Regiment of Foot, which had been stationed in the Midlands from 1818, helping to maintain public order, before moving to Ireland in 1821. Army records show he was baptised at Maghera in July 1823; some sources that place his birth a decade earlier or 1822 are mistaken.

His early family history may be connected to the movements of the 52nd Regiment of Foot, which, according to online regimental timelines, was stationed in New Brunswick, Nova Scotia, Newfoundland, Prince Edward Island from 1823 to 1831. Regimental registers name two brothers, Adam, born in Halifax, Nova Scotia, in 1829, and James, born in Waterford in 1832. This is particularly noteworthy given that military regulations and circumstances could restrict the ability of soldiers’ wives and children to accompany their husbands and fathers on overseas postings. If Hawthorne’s parents did make the journey to Halifax with their infant child, their experience would have formed a significant part of his early life.

Accounts differ on why he joined the army. One says he ran away from home because his father wanted him to become a Presbyterian minister; another says his family had fallen on hard times and he was working as a labourer by the age of ten. Neither account has been verified.

== Details ==
On 15 February 1836, at the age of twelve, Hawthorne enlisted as a boy soldier in his father’s regiment, the 52nd (Oxfordshire) Regiment of Foot, at Athlone, County Roscommon, Ireland. His regiment served in Gibraltar for a year, followed by Barbados for four years, and then six years in British North America, initially in Quebec, followed by New Brunswick in 1842 and finally Nova Scotia in 1843. He completed his boy's service as a private, and was appointed as a bugler on 1 August 1844.

Hawthorne left Canada in 1845. The regimental history summarises a period of service in the West Indies. Hawthorne came to England with the 52nd (Oxfordshire) Regiment of Foot, as the regiment resumed home service. During this period, the regiment was deployed in support of the civil authorities against the Chartists. On 27 June 1850 Hawthorne was involved in a brawl and arrested in Liverpool. He was court-martialled, confined to cells for 48 days, and lost a penny a day from his pay for six months. He also forfeited his Long Service and Good Conduct Medal. In 1851 the regiment moved to Limerick during the suppression of the Young Ireland movement.

After service in England and Ireland, Hawthorne embarked for India with his regiment in June 1853. The regiment was stationed in the Upper Provinces in 1854, at Meerut in March 1855 and at Cawnpore in 1856, and served throughout the Indian Rebellion of 1857. It moved to the Punjab in May 1857.

On 14 September 1857, Robert Hawthorne took part in the assault on the Kashmiri Gate in Delhi during the Indian Rebellion of 1857. Serving as a bugler with the 52nd Regiment of Foot, he accompanied the explosion party tasked with demolishing the gate to enable the British assault force to enter the city. Following the explosion, Lieutenant Duncan Home ordered Hawthorne to sound the advance. During the operation, Hawthorne assisted the severely wounded Lieutenant Philip Salkeld of the Bengal Engineers, binding his wounds under heavy enemy fire and arranging for his removal to safety. For his gallantry, Hawthorne was awarded the Victoria Cross.`

His actions were recognised in a commendation issued by Major-General Sir Archdale Wilson on 21 September 1857.

Bugler Hawthorne, who accompanied the explosion party, not only performed the dangerous duty on which he was employed, but previously attached himself to Lieutenant Salkeld, of the Engineers, when dangerously wounded, bound up his wounds under a heavy musketry fire, and had him removed without further injury". (General Order of Major-General Sir Archdale Wilson, Bart., K.C.B., dated Head Quarters, Delhi City, 21 September 1857.)

He also received the Indian Mutiny Medal with clasp "Delhi". He returned to England and was stationed at Chatham in 1860–61 prior to being discharged.

== Later life ==
Following his discharge from the British Army at his own request on 20 April 1861, he entered civilian employment as a bank porter with the firm of Cunliffe, Brooks, at its premises in King Street, Manchester.

On 14 September 1861 he married Christina Adelaide, daughter of John Neale, a watchmaker, at St Mary's Church, Hulme, Lancashire. They had two sons and three daughters.

He died at his home, 1 Huntingdon Street, Chorlton-on-Medlock, on 2 February 1879 and was buried with full military honours in Ardwick Cemetery.

== The medal ==
The subsequent history of Hawthorne’s Victoria Cross is unclear until 1909, by which time it was in the collection of Lieutenant-Colonel G. A. Gaskell. The date and circumstances of Gaskell’s acquisition of the medal are unknown. In February 1909, it was sold at auction for £108, equivalent to approximately £16,687 in 2026, adjusted for inflation. According to the 52nd Regiment’s 1962 chronicle, five officers who had served with the regiment during the storming of the Kashmiri Gate in Delhi purchased the medal at auction and presented it to the regiment.

The Victoria Cross was subsequently donated to the Royal Green Jackets (Rifles) Museum in Winchester, Hampshire where it is displayed, along with his Indian Mutiny Medal.

== Commemoration ==
His courage is commemorated by the Soldiers of Oxfordshire Museum through its Kashmir Inkwell story, which preserves the memory of his vital contribution to this historic British military operation.

The action at the Kashmiri Gate was painted by Chevalier L. W. Desanges in 1859. This painting formed part of his series of commemorating acts of bravery recognised with the Victoria Cross. The first 24 paintings in the series were exhibited at the Egyptian Hall in Piccadilly in April 1859. The larger collection was exhibited at the Crystal Palace in 1862. The painting is now held in the Royal Engineers Museum, Gillingham, Kent.

The memorial stone at Kashmiri Gate, Delhi, includes the name of Hawthorne, was erected in 1876 by Robert Napier, 1st Baron Napier of Magdala, then General Lord Napier of Magdala, Commander-in-Chief in India.

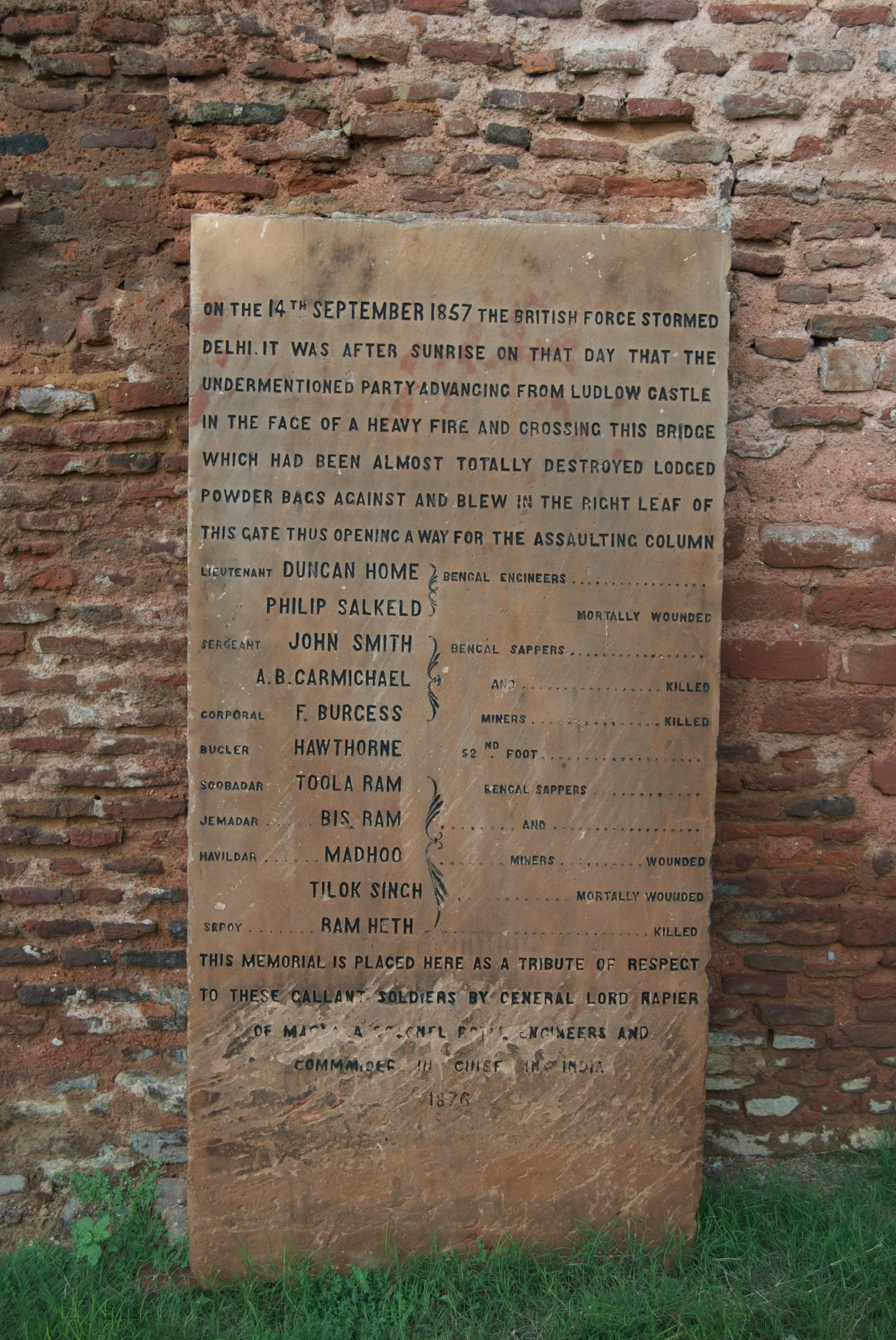
Memorial stone at Kashmiri Gate, Delhi, commemorating the British assault of 14 September 1857.

Hawthorne's grave in Ardwick Cemetery is unmarked, as the headstones were removed in the 1950s. A memorial plaque, erected by Sir Philip B. Dingle CBE LLD, Town Clerk of Manchester (1944-1966) presently stands at the site, which was renamed Nicholls Field in 1966.
