= 54th (West Norfolk) Regiment of Foot =

- Active: 1755–1881
- Country: Kingdom of Great Britain (1755–1800); United Kingdom (1801–1881)
- Branch: British Army
- Type: Infantry
- Size: One battalion (two battalions 1800–1802)
- Garrison/HQ: Normanton Barracks, Derbyshire
- Nicknames: The Popinjays; The Flamers
- Engagements: American Revolutionary War; French Revolutionary Wars; Napoleonic Wars; Fifth Xhosa War; First Anglo-Burmese War; Indian Rebellion

The 54th Regiment of Foot was an infantry regiment of the British Army, raised in 1755. Under the Childers Reforms it amalgamated with the 39th (Dorsetshire) Regiment of Foot to form the Dorsetshire Regiment in 1881.

== History ==
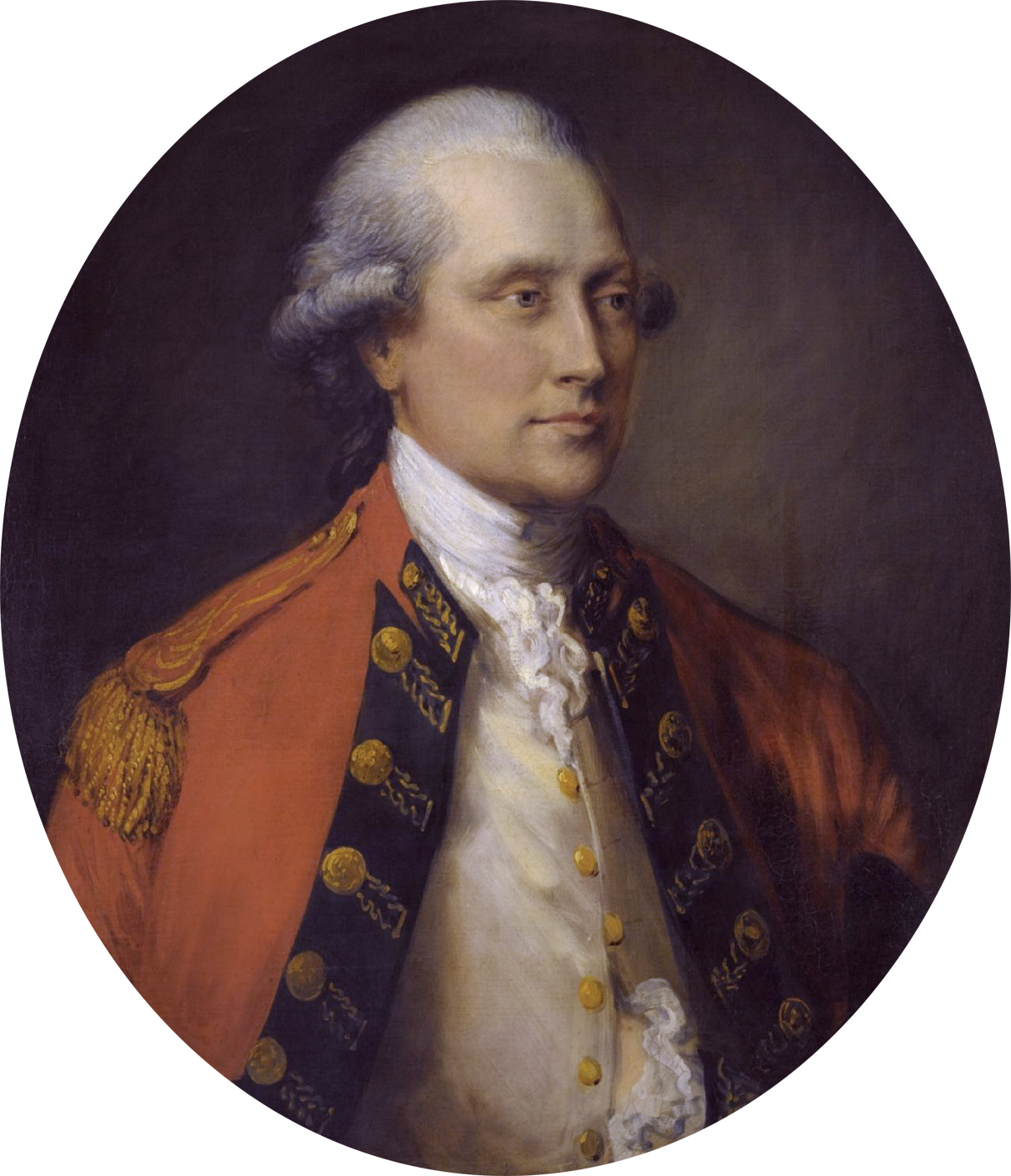
John Campbell, 5th Duke of Argyll, founder of the regiment, by Thomas Gainsborough

=== Early history ===
The regiment was raised in Salisbury by John Campbell, 5th Duke of Argyll in 1755 as the 56th Regiment of Foot for service in the Seven Years' War. It was re-ranked as the 54th Regiment of Foot, following the disbandment of the existing 50th and 51st regiments, in 1756. The regiment was deployed to Gibraltar in 1756 and remained there until it moved to Ireland in 1765.

=== American Revolution ===
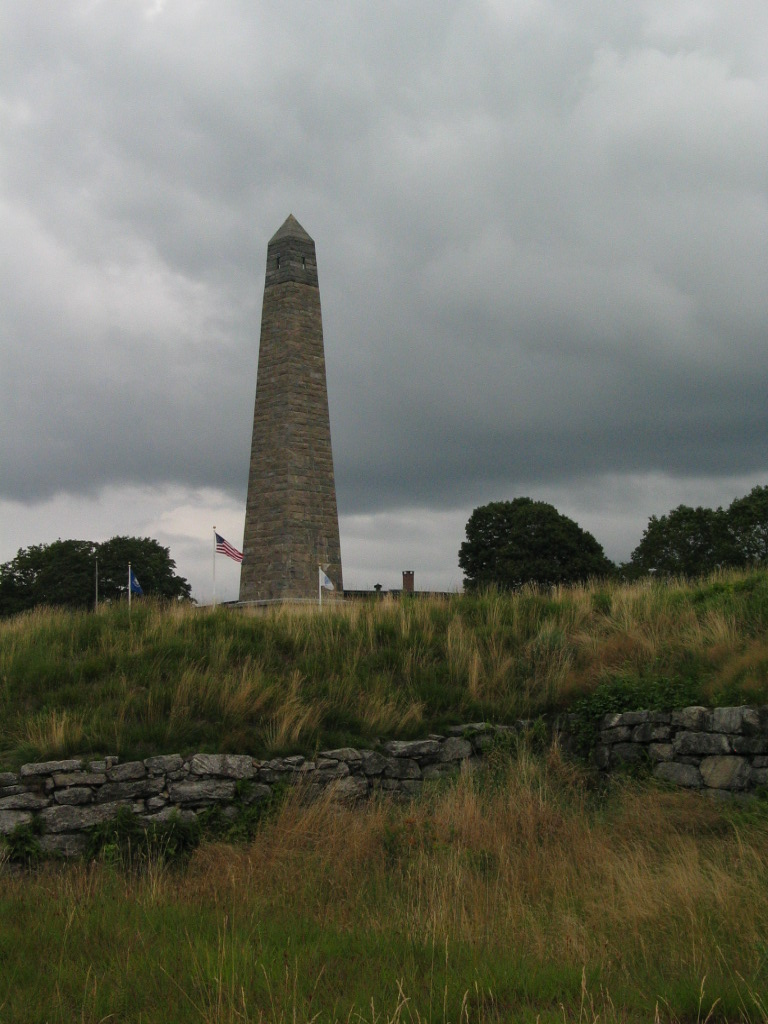
The Groton Monument and national historic site occupies the location of the Battle of Groton Heights in September 1781

The regiment was deployed to North America for service in the American Revolutionary War in 1776 and first saw action at the Battle of Sullivan's Island in June 1776. It went on to fight at the Battle of Long Island in August 1776, and the Battle of Rhode Island in August 1778.

In May 1778 100 men of the 54th Regiment of Foot embarked on boats to attack saw mills at Fall River, Massachusetts. The galley Pigot and some armed boats were to provide support. Pigot grounded, but the attack proceeded anyway. A sharp skirmish ensued when the troops arrived at their objective. Even so, they were able to destroy one saw mill and one grain mill, as well as a large stock of planks and boards, other buildings, some cedar boats, and so on. They then withdrew, having lost two men killed and five officers and men wounded. As the tide returned, Pigot was floated off, but as Flora towed her off, Flora lost two men killed and a lieutenant severely wounded.

In July 1779, the regiment was part of a force of 2,600 men led by Major General William Tryon, that conducted a series of raids on the Connecticut port towns of New Haven, Fairfield, and Norwalk. The 54th was part of the first division, led by Brigadier General George Garth, which also consisted of several companies of Royal Fusiliers, foot guards, and Hessian jägers. Garth's division landed at West Haven on 5 July, and proceeded to New Haven, encountering opposition from the local militia. There the 54th sustained significant losses, amounting to two officers, one drummer, and five rank and file wounded, one sergeant and five rank and file killed, and one sergeant and seven rank and file missing. The following day the regiment was ordered back to their transports while the rest of the division carried on with the assault of the town. At Fairfield, due to an insufficient number of boats to transport the whole first division, the 54th did not go ashore, and Garth took only the flank companies of the Guards, one company of the Landgraves, and the King's America Regiment with two field pieces. On 12 July, at Norwalk, the 54th led the column against the rebels, driving them, with "great alacrity and spirit" from Drummond Hill.

The regiment went on to assault Fort Griswold in Groton, Connecticut, at the Battle of Groton Heights in September 1781. American sources later claimed that the battle resulted in almost 80 American soldiers being massacred by the British after the American commander, Lieutenant Colonel William Ledyard, had surrendered, though there is a lack of contemporary corroboration.

The regiment returned home in 1781 and adopted a county designation becoming the 54th (West Norfolk) Regiment of Foot in 1782.

=== Napoleonic Wars ===
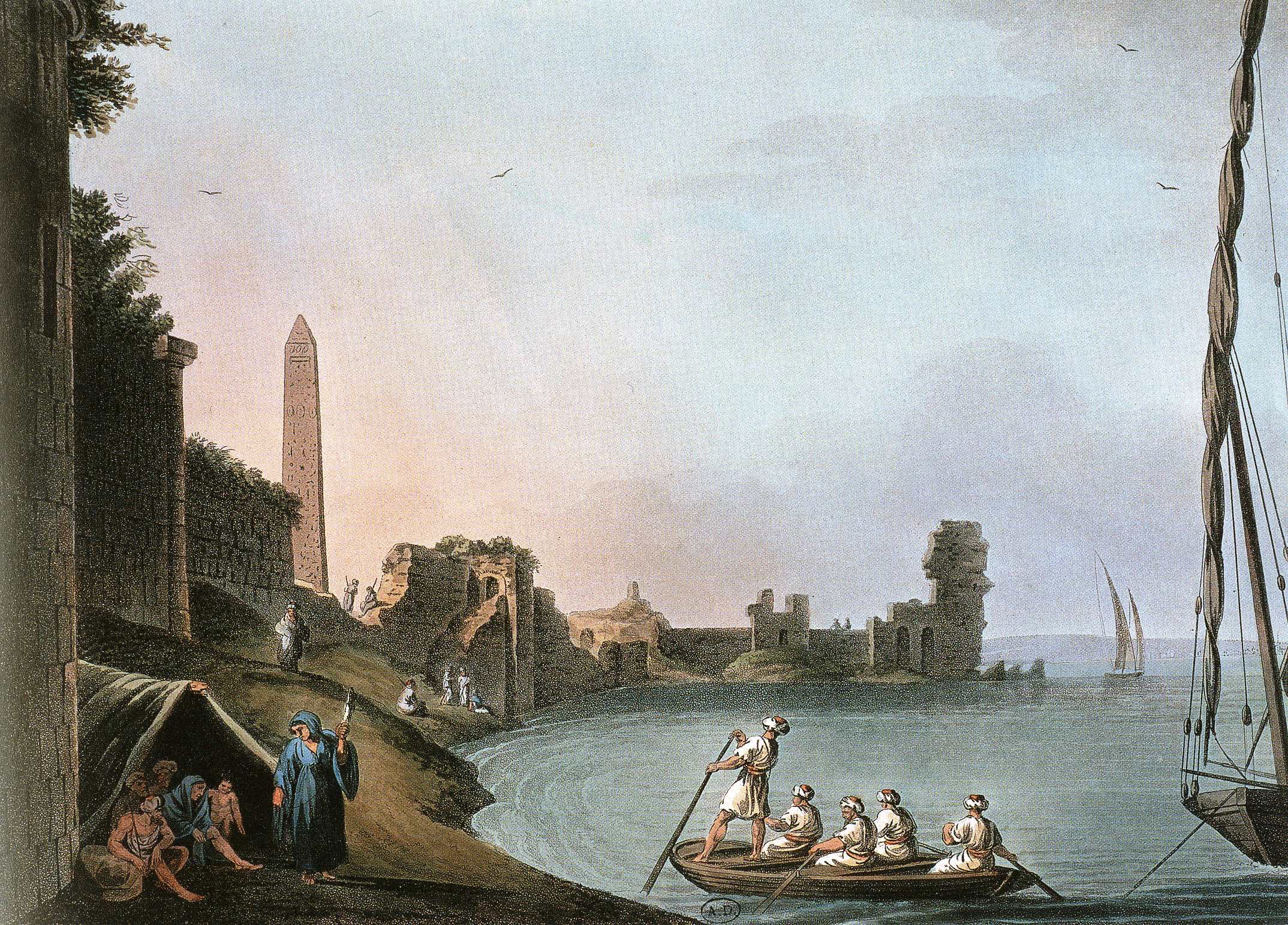
The fortifications at Alexandria shortly after the regiment's assault on Fort Marabout in August 1801 during French campaign in Egypt and Syria

In June 1794 the regiment embarked for Flanders for service in the French Revolutionary Wars. The regiment returned to England in 1795 but then embarked for the West Indies later in the year where it helped suppress an insurrection by caribs on Saint Vincent in 1796. A second battalion was raised in May 1800 to increase the strength of the regiment. Both battalions took part in the unsuccessful Ferrol Expedition in August 1800 and the subsequent equally unsuccessful attack on Cádiz in October 1800. Both battalions then embarked for Egypt for service in the French campaign in Egypt and Syria. They saw action at the Battle of Abukir in March 1801, the Battle of Alexandria later that month and the Siege of Cairo in June 1801. The 1st battalion also took part in the Siege of Alexandria where it encountered fierce opposition at Fort Marabout in August 1801: the battalion eventually carried out a successful assault on the fort. The battalions amalgamated again in May 1802 and the regiment moved to Gibraltar in 1803.

In early 1807 the regiment embarked on the Second invasion of the River Plate under the leadership of Sir Samuel Auchmuty: it saw action at the Battle of Montevideo in February 1807 and Second Battle of Buenos Aires in July 1807. The regiment was sent to Stralsund in Swedish Pomerania 1810 and remained there until the Battle of Waterloo in June 1815: its only involvement at Waterloo was capturing Cambrai in the aftermath of the battle.

The regiment was sent to South Africa in 1819 for service in the Fifth Xhosa War. It moved to India in 1822 and to Burma in 1824 for service in the First Anglo-Burmese War: it formed part of an army which advanced up the River Irrawaddy to the Kingdom of Ava before returning to India in 1825 and embarking for England in 1840.

=== Indian rebellion ===
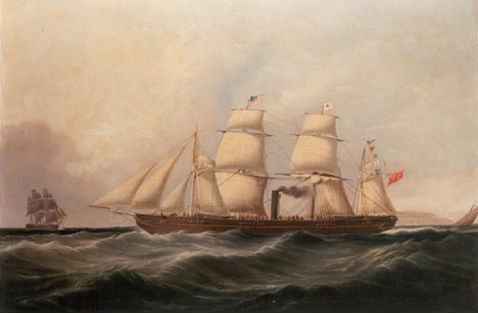
SS Sarah Sands c.1850, by Joseph Heard

On deployment to India during the Indian Rebellion about 350 men and five women of the headquarters, 54 Regiment, were aboard SS Sarah Sands, one of the earliest iron, screw type steamers, when fire broke out on 11 November 1857. The ship had been built in 1846 and had previously been chartered by the British government for the Crimean War and was again under charter transporting troops and a large amount of powder and ammunition carried in two magazines. The ship was a thousand miles from nearest land and outside shipping lanes, and if lost with all aboard would have been another mystery, though messages were placed in bottles that were never found. Some of the crew, which had been troublesome since sailing, abandoned ship in the two best boats leaving the ship's officers, remaining crew and men of the regiment to fight the fire. The ladies were put in a boat with what provisions could be found and Private William Wiles of the regiment and ship's Quartermaster Richard Richmond risked their lives to save the regimental colours from below decks.

The starboard magazine was cleared of explosives but the port magazine was reached only through suffocating smoke and volunteers led by Major Hughes cleared what they could but two large barrels of powder could not be brought up to be thrown overboard. At about nine in the evening the fire broke through the deck, set fire to rigging and shortly after the expected explosion of the powder occurred blowing out the after cabins, remnants of the saloon and ship's port quarter, even causing the ship's stern to momentarily dip under water. Though rafts had been prepared the remaining crew and troops continued to fight the fire through the night, cutting through the deck and using buckets to fight the fire that was beginning to turn the iron hull red hot. By nine the next morning the fire was under control but the ship's after portion was entirely burned out, with even glass in the ports melted, and flooded with loose water tanks smashing against the hull. Those in boats were recovered, the stern was strengthened with an arrangement of chain and leaks stopped with sail and steering managed by a system of six men sitting on planks rigged each side of the rudder controlling it using ropes. Thus the ship made the nearly thousand miles to Mauritius arriving on 25 November despite miseries endured with short rations of food and water. The regiment was sent to Calcutta in another vessel and Sarah Sands was repaired enough to sail for Britain and full repair to sail for Bombay as a sailing ship—where she ran aground and was so badly damaged that she was abandoned. The iron construction, aided by three iron watertight bulkheads, one constantly kept cool by troops wetting it with water, saved the ship and probably all the lives and later substantially helped remove prejudice against iron vessels. The regiment saw little action during the rebellion and returned to England in 1866 but was re-deployed to India in 1871.

=== Amalgamation ===
As part of the Cardwell Reforms of the 1870s, where single-battalion regiments were linked together to share a single depot and recruiting district in the United Kingdom, the 54th was linked with the 95th (Derbyshire) Regiment of Foot, and assigned to district no. 26 at Normanton Barracks in Derbyshire. On 1 July 1881 the Childers Reforms came into effect and the regiment amalgamated with the 39th (Dorsetshire) Regiment of Foot to form the Dorsetshire Regiment.

== Battle honours ==
Battle honours won by the regiment were:

- Marabout, Egypt
- Second Burmese War: Ava

== Colonels of the Regiment ==
Colonels of the regiment were:

=== 56th Regiment of Foot - (1755) ===
- 1755–1757: F.M. John Campbell, 5th Duke of Argyll (Marquess of Lorne)

=== 54th Regiment of Foot - (1756) ===
- 1757–1760: Gen. John Grey
- 1760–1770: Gen. John Parslow
- 1770–1801: Gen. Mariscoe Frederick

=== 54th (the West Norfolk) Regiment of Foot - (1782) ===
- 1801–1807: Gen. Sir David Baird, 1st Baronet, GCB, KC
- 1807–1808: Gen. Oliver Nicolls
- 1808–1809: Gen. Hon. Edward Finch
- 1809–1816: Gen. James Ochonar Forbes, 17th Baron Forbes
- 1816–1841: Gen. Isaac Gascoyne
- 1841–1845: Lt-Gen. Sir Henry Sheehy Keating, KCB
- 1845–1850: Gen. Ulysses de Burgh, 2nd Baron Downes, GCB
- 1850–1856: Lt-Gen. William Alexander Gordon, CB
- 1856–1860: Gen. Sir William Codrington, GCB
- 1860–12 March 1868: Gen. Mildmay Fane
- 24 March 1868 – 21 November 1876: Gen. Studholme John Hodgson
- 21 November 1876 – 1877: Gen. David Elliot Mackirdy
- 1877–1880: Gen. Lord Mark Ralph George Kerr, GCB
- 1880–1881: Gen. John Ramsay Stuart, CB
- 1881 Regiment amalgamated with the 39th (Dorsetshire) Regiment of Foot to form the Dorsetshire Regiment

== Bibliography ==
- Allyn, Charles (1999) [1882]. Battle of Groton Heights: September 6, 1781. New London: Seaport Autographs. ISBN 978-0-9672626-1-1. OCLC 45702866.
- Bradlee, Francis B. C. (1913). "The Burning of the Sarah Sands". International Marine Engineering. 18 (February 1913). New York: Aldrich Publishing Company.
- Brown, Steve (September 2014). Burnham, Robert (ed.). "British Infantry Regiments and the Men Who Led Them 1793-1815—54th Regiment of Foot" (PDF). The Napoleon Series.
- Ofgang, Erik (9 May 2022). "Did British troops murder surrendered American soldiers at Groton Heights during the Revolutionary War?". Connecticut Magazine. New Haven, CT: Hearst Communications.
- Pigot, Major General (1778). "Copy of a letter from Major General Pigot to Sir Henry Clinton". The London Gazette (12 September 1778). London.
- Records of the 54th West Norfolk Regiment. Thomason Civil Engineering College Press. 1881.
- Townshend, Charles Hervey (1879). "The British invasion of New Haven, Connecticut". New Haven, Connecticut. p. 40.
