= Cyrus Trapaud =

British Army officer

General Cyrus Trapaud
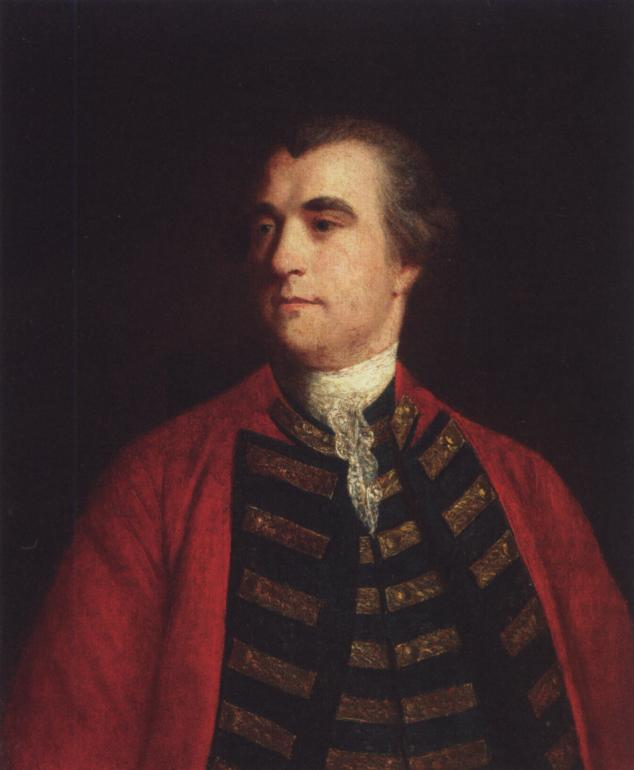
- Portrait by Sir Joshua Reynolds, c. 1760
- Born: 18 August 1715; Dublin
- Died: 3 May 1801 (aged 85); London
- Military career
- Allegiance: Great Britain
- Branch: British Army
- Service years: 1735–1801
- Rank: General
- Conflicts: War of the Austrian Succession; Battle of Dettingen; Battle of Fontenoy; Jacobite rising of 1745; Battle of Falkirk Muir; Battle of Culloden; Seven Years' War; Battle of Quiberon Bay

General Cyrus Trapaud (18 August 1715 – 3 May 1801) was a British Army officer.

Trapaud was born in Dublin, the son of a Huguenot refugee family, and a relative of Marshal Turenne.

He served in the Buffs (Royal East Kent Regiment), accompanying the regiment to the Netherlands in 1742. As an ensign at the Battle of Dettingen, 1743, he reputedly saved the life of King George II, whose horse had bolted, and received a promotion as a reward. Trapaud was also present at the battles of Battle of Fontenoy, Falkirk and Culloden.

In 1760, Trapaud was made a colonel in the 70th Regiment of Foot; he was promoted to major general in 1762, lieutenant general in 1772, and full general in 1783. He was Colonel of the 70th regiment from 1760 to 1778, when he was transferred as Colonel to the 52nd (Oxfordshire) Regiment of Foot.

On his death in 1801, he was succeeded as Colonel by Sir John Moore.

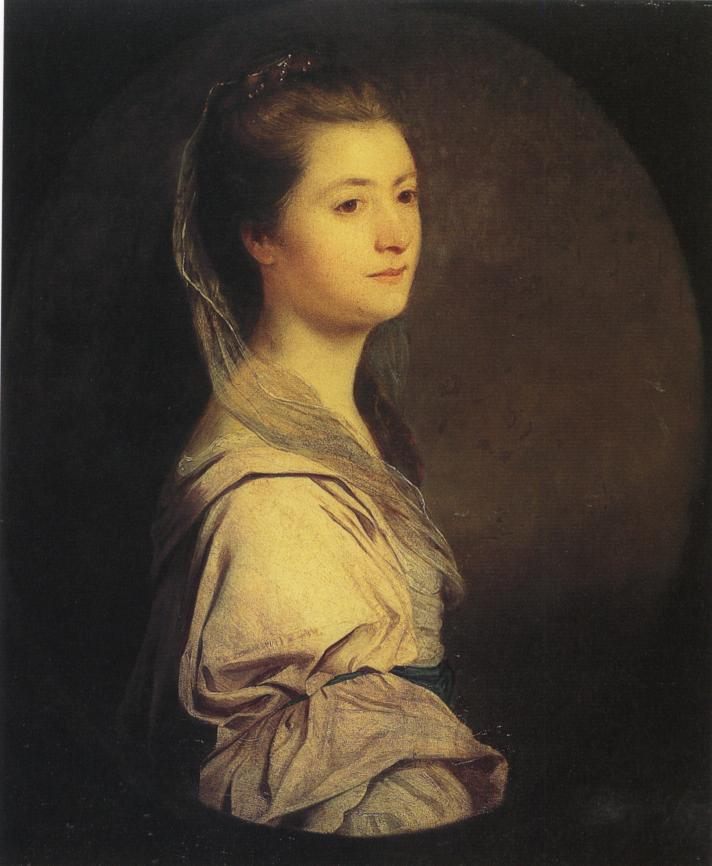
Catherine Plaistow Trapaud, by Joshua Reynolds, circa 1761.

Trapaud was married to Catherine Plaistow, daughter of General Plaistow, in 1751. Her portrait was also painted by Sir Joshua Reynolds. Copies of these, by Edward Fisher, are held by the National Portrait Gallery. Trapaud's brother was deputy Governor of Fort Augustus.

Military offices
Preceded by Sir John Clavering	Colonel of the 52nd (Oxfordshire) Regiment of Foot; 1778–1801	Succeeded by Sir John Moore
Preceded by John Parslow	Colonel of the 70th (Glasgow Lowland) Regiment of Foot; 1760–1778	Succeeded by William Tryon
