= Major John Grey (British Army officer) =

18th Century Officer

Major-General John Grey (died 10 March 1760) was an officer of the British Army.

== Background ==
Entering the Army on 17 February 1710 as an ensign Grey served in the King's Regiment of Foot. On 22 December 1712 he was promoted lieutenant, but was placed on half-pay when his company was reduced in 1713. He was restored to full-pay in 1716, promoted captain-lieutenant on 1 January 1727, and to captain on 10 December 1731.

Grey served with the King's Regiment as a captain in the campaign of 1743. Towards the end of the Battle of Dettingen he took command of the regiment after Lieutenant-Colonel Keightley and Major Barry were wounded. For his services at Dettingen he was promoted major on 14 July 1743, following Barry's death. He was later present at the Battle of Fontenoy, where he was wounded. Grey was promoted to lieutenant-colonel of the 14th Regiment of Foot on 17 February 1746, and colonel of the 54th Regiment of Foot on 5 April 1757. He was promoted to major-general on 25 June 1759. He died on 10 March 1760 and was buried at St James's Church, Piccadilly, on 15 March 1760.
