= Duncan Home =

Recipient of the Victoria Cross

- Born: 10 June 1828; Jabalpur, British India
- Died: 1 October 1857 (aged 29); Malagarh, India
- Burial place: Bolandsharh Cemetery, Aligarh, India
- Military career
- Allegiance: United Kingdom
- Branch: Bengal Army
- Service years: 1848–1857 †
- Rank: Lieutenant
- Units: Bengal Engineers
- Conflicts: Second Anglo-Sikh War; Indian Mutiny
- Awards: Victoria Cross

Duncan Charles Home VC (10 June 1828 – 1 October 1857) was a recipient of the Victoria Cross, the highest and most prestigious award for gallantry in the face of the enemy that can be awarded to British and Commonwealth forces.

== Details ==
Home was 29 years old, and a lieutenant in the Bengal Engineers, Bengal Army during the Indian Mutiny when the following deed took place on 14 September 1857 during the Siege of Delhi, India for which he, Lieutenant Philip Salkeld, Sergeant John Smith and bugler Robert Hawthorne were awarded the VC:

Lieutenants Duncan Charles Home and Philip Salkeld, Bengal Engineers, upon whom the Victoria Cross was provisionally conferred by Major-General Sir Archdale Wilson, Bart., K.C.B., for their conspicuous bravery in the performance of the desperate duty of blowing in the Cashmere Gate of tho Fortress of Delhi, in broad daylight, under a heavy fire of musketry, on the morning of the 14th September, 1857, preparatory to the assault, would have been recommended to Her Majesty for confirmation in that distinction, had they survived.

— London Gazette, 18 June 1858.

He was killed in action at Malagarh, India, on 1 October 1857.

== The medal ==
The original medal was lost in 1920 when children of the then owner played "Soldiers" in a field near the house. Despite many searches, it has not been found.
