= Joseph Heard =

English painter (1799–1859)

Joseph Heard (February 1799 – 10 November 1859) was an English marine painter.

== Biography ==
He was born in Egremont, Cumbria in February 1799, the son of a saddler named Joseph Heard. He attended Edinburgh University and studied anatomy and physiology. He died in Upper Pitt Street in Liverpool on 10 November 1859.
