= Philip Salkeld =

Recipient of the Victoria Cross

- Born: 13 October 1830; Fontmell Magna, Dorset
- Died: 10 October 1857 (aged 26); Delhi, British India
- Burial place: Old Delhi Military Cemetery, Delhi
- Military career
- Allegiance: United Kingdom
- Branch: Bengal Army
- Rank: Lieutenant
- Units: Bengal Engineers
- Conflicts: Indian Mutiny
- Awards: Victoria Cross

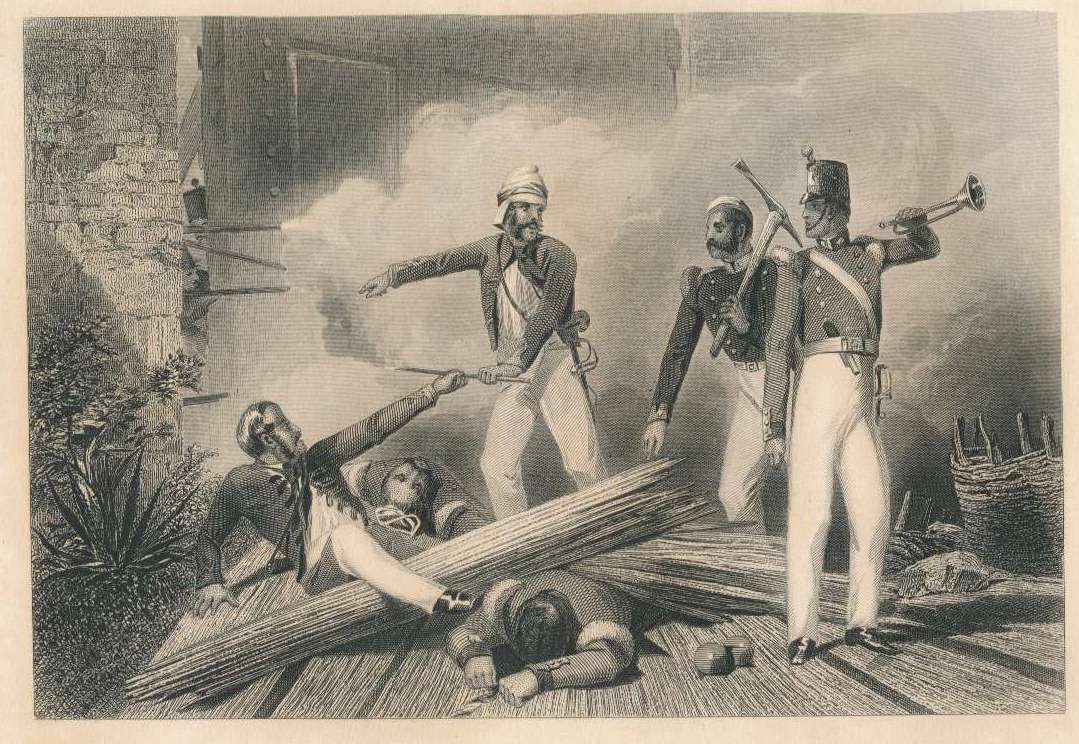
Blowing up of the Cashmere Gate at Delhi, 14 Sept. 1857, steel engraving

Philip Salkeld VC (13 October 1830 – 10 October 1857) was an English recipient of the Victoria Cross, the highest and most prestigious award for gallantry in the face of the enemy that can be awarded to British and Commonwealth forces. He was the first person to be awarded the Victoria Cross posthumously.

He was born at the Rectory in Fontmell Magna, Dorset, England, educated at King's College School, London, and is buried in the Old Delhi Military Cemetery, Delhi, India.

== Details ==
Salkeld was 26 years old, and a lieutenant in the Bengal Engineers, Bengal Army during the Indian Mutiny when the following deed took place for which he together with Duncan Charles Home was awarded the VC:

Lieutenants Duncan Charles Home- and Philip Salkeld, Bengal Engineers, upon whom the Victoria Cross was provisionally conferred by Major-General Sir Archdale Wilson, Bart., K.C.B., for their conspicuous bravery in the performance of the desperate duty of blowing in the Cashmere Gate of the Fortress of Delhi, in broad daylight, under a heavy fire of musketry, on the morning of the 14th September, 1857, preparatory to the assault, would have been recommended to Her Majesty for confirmation in that distinction, had they survived.

He was killed in action at Delhi on 10 October 1857.

Salkeld's companion at King's College School, Robert Haydon Shebbeare also received the Victoria Cross on the same day for his action in the fourth column attacking Delhi at the Kabul Gate.
