= Charles Shepherd (photographer) =

English photographer and printer

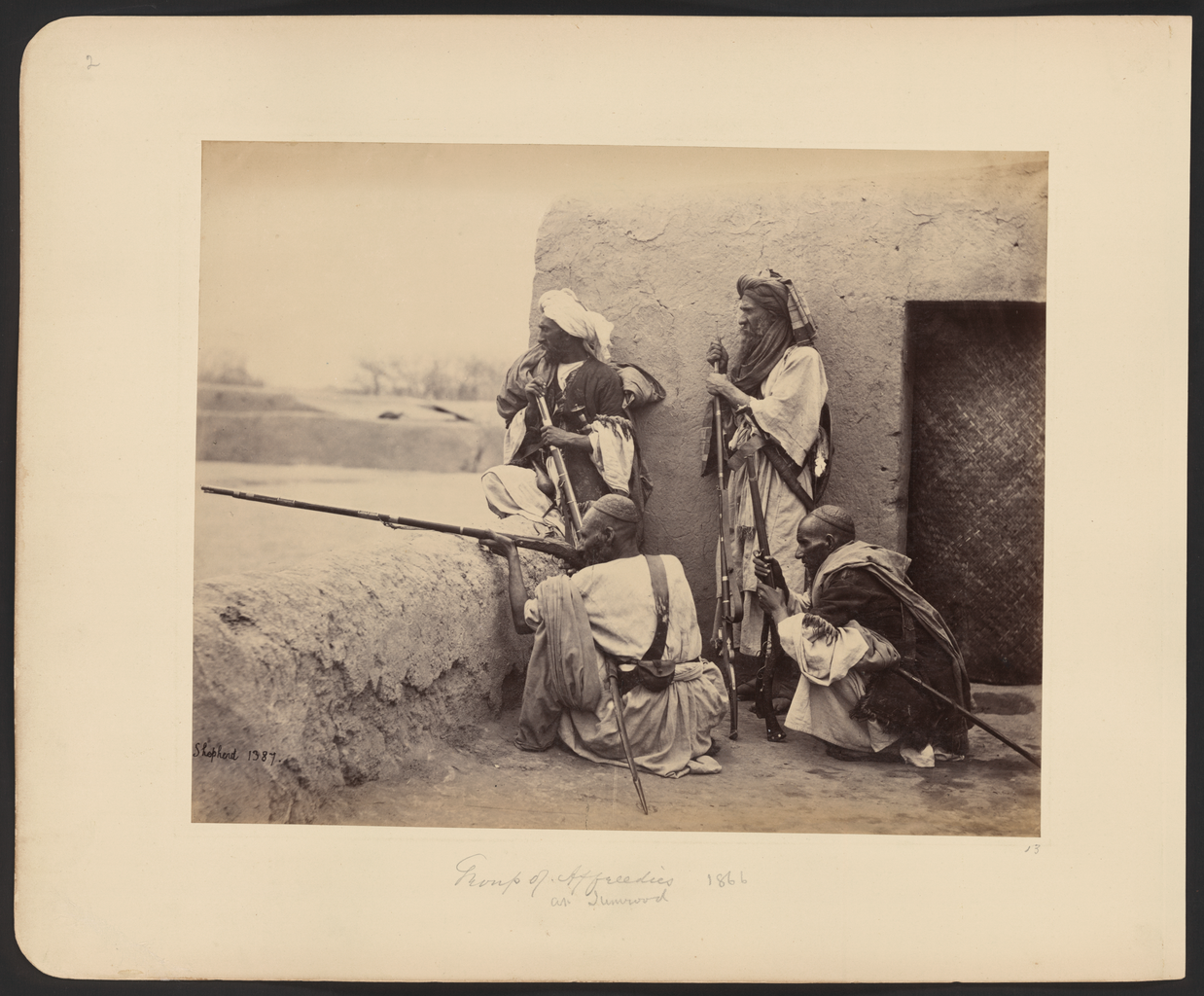
Afridis at Jamrūd Fort (1866) by Charles Shepherd. Jamrūd Fort was strategically located at the eastern entrance to the Khyber Pass in present-day Pakistan

Charles Shepherd (fl. 1858–1878) was an English photographer and printer who worked in India in the second half of the 19th century. His photographs include scenes of soldiers and civilians, both English and indigenous.

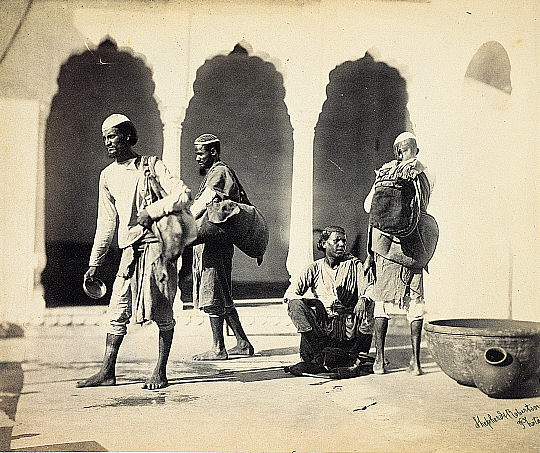
Shepherd & Robertson photo of "Bheesties", Muslim water bearers, some of whom accompanied soldiers into battle to provide them with the life giving liquid (published 1868)

In 1862, Shepherd and Arthur Robertson established a photographic studio called Shepherd & Robertson in Agra. The firm moved to Simla in 1864, at which point Samuel Bourne joined the business to work as principal photographer. At about this time, the firm changed its name to Howard, Shepherd & Bourne, and after the departure of Howard it became Bourne & Shepherd around 1868. Shepherd and Bourne opened a second branch in Calcutta (now Kolkata), where they operated a portrait studio, and their work was widely retailed throughout the subcontinent by agents and in Britain through wholesale distributors.

Bourne returned to England in 1870, but the firm continued under the Bourne & Shepherd name. He was replaced as head photographer in 1872 by Colin Murray.

Shepherd, who had primarily worked as the printer for his firms, finally left Bourne & Shepherd in 1885. Bourne & Shepherd continues to operate in Kolkata.

== Works ==
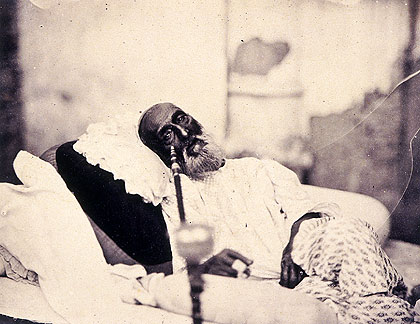
The only extant photograph of the last Mughal Emperor, Bahadur Shah Zafar II, taken along with Robert Tytler, May 1858.
