= Samuel Bourne =

British photographer (1834–1912)

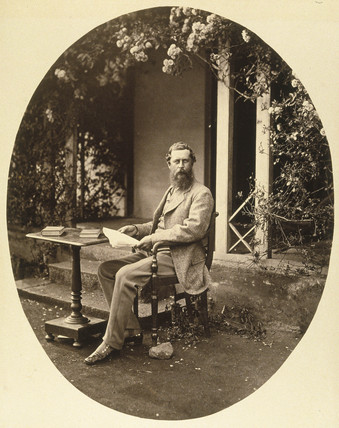
- Bourne in 1864
- Born: 30 October 1834; Staffordshire, England
- Died: 24 April 1912 (aged 77)
- Occupation: Photographer
- Style: Landscapes, Ethnographic Portraits

Samuel Bourne (30 October 1834 – 24 April 1912) was a British photographer known for his prolific seven years' work in India, from 1863 to 1870. Together with Charles Shepherd, he set up Bourne & Shepherd first in Shimla in 1863 and later in Kolkata (Calcutta); the company closed in June 2016.

== Early life and education ==
Samuel Bourne was born on 30 October 1834, at Napley Heath, near Mucklestone, on the Staffordshire and Shropshire border to Thomas Bourne (b. 1804) and his wife Harriet née Dobson (b. 1802). After being educated by a clergyman near Fairburn, he secured a job with Moore and Robinson's Bank, Nottingham in 1855. His amateur photographic activities started at about this time and he quickly became an accomplished landscape photographer, soon lecturing on photography and contributing technical articles to several photographic journals.

In 1858, Bourne made a photographic tour of the Lake District, and in 1859, displayed photographs at the Nottingham Photographic Society's annual exhibition. The following year, his photographs were also shown in London, at the London International Exhibition of 1862. This reception he received motivated him to give up his position at the bank, and set sail for India to work as a professional photographer; arriving in Calcutta early in 1863.

== Work in India ==
He initially set up in partnership with an already established Calcutta photographer, William Howard. They moved up to Simla, where they established a new studio 'Howard & Bourne', to be joined in 1864 by Charles Shepherd, to form 'Howard, Bourne & Shepherd'. By 1866, after the departure of Howard, it became 'Bourne & Shepherd', which became the premier photographic studio in India, and until it closed in June 2016 was perhaps the world's oldest photographic business. Charles Shepherd evidently remained in Simla, to carry out the commercial and portrait studio work, and to supervise the printing and marketing of Bourne's landscape and architectural studies, whilst Bourne was away travelling around the sub-continent.

Bourne spent six years in India, and by the time he returned to England in January 1871, he had made approximately 2,200 images of the landscape and architecture of India and the Himalayas. Working primarily with a 10x12;inch plate camera, and using the Wet Plate Collodion process. His ability to create photographs whilst travelling in the remotest areas of the Himalayas and working under exciting physical conditions, places him firmly amongst the very finest of nineteenth century travel photographers.

On 29 July 1863, he left Simla on the first of his three major Himalayan photographic expeditions. With a retinue of some 30 porters to carry his equipment, he travelled across the Simla Hills to Chini, in the Valley of the Sutlej River, 160 miles north-east of Simla, and spent some time photographing in the Chini-Sutlej River area, before heading up to the borders of Spiti, and returning to Simla on 12 October 1863, with 147 fine negatives.

In the following year, Bourne set out on another major trip, this time a nine-month trip to Kashmir. Leaving Lahore on 17 March, he journeyed north-east to Kangra and from there, via Byjnath, Holta, Dharmsala and Dalhousie, to Chamba. From there, he went on to Kashmir, arriving on the borders on 8 June; by the middle of the month had reached the Chenab Valley. The following weeks were spent photographing the scenery of Kashmir before proceeding to Srinagar, where he stopped for some weeks, sight seeing and photographing before continuing his journey on 15 September. The return journey took in the Sind Valley, Baramula, Murree, Delhi and Cawnpore (now Kanpur) before arriving in Lucknow on Christmas Eve 1864.

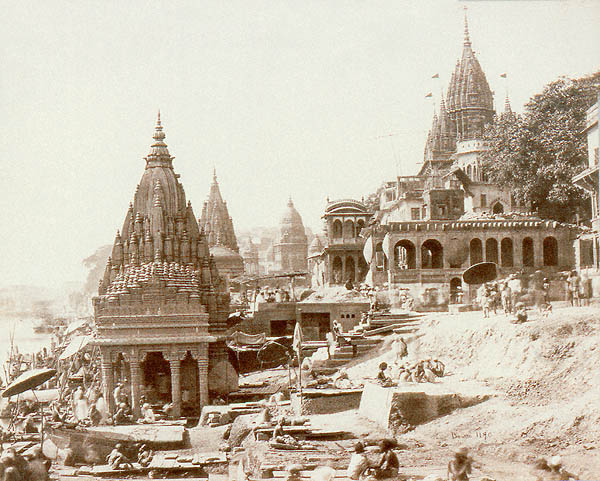
Vishnu Pud and Other Temples by Bourne

Bourne's third and last major trip was perhaps his most ambitious; consisting of a six-month journey in the Himalayas with the goal of reaching and photographing the source of the Ganges. He left Simla on 3 July 1866, in the company of Dr. G.R. Playfair (brother of the famous English politician Dr. Lyon Playfair), and travelled with him through Kulu and Lahaul, over the Kunzum Pass into the Spiti valley, where they later parted company. Bourne then continued on alone (except for his forty porters!); over the Manirung Pass, where he took spectacular views of the 18,600 foot high pass; which held the record for the highest altitude photographs that had yet been taken for twenty years. Thence, down to the junction of the Spiti and Sutlej Rivers and on to Sungnam and the Buspa Valley. He then climbed up over the Neela Pass, and down into the Upper Ganges Valley, where he journeyed on up to the Gangotri Glacier. There he went on to photograph one of the prime sources of the Ganges, as it issued from the mouth of the glacial ice cave at Gaumukh. His return journey took in Agra, Mussoorie, Roorkee, Meerut and Naini Tal, and he arrived back in Simla, again in time for Christmas! He wrote extensively about his travels in the Himalayas (one of the very few photographers in India to do so), in a long series of letters, which appeared in The British Journal of Photography, between 1863 and 1870.

The studio business prospered, and in 1866, they opened a second branch in Calcutta, where they ran a portrait studio, and their work was widely retailed throughout the subcontinent by agents and in Britain through wholesale distributors. In 1867 he went briefly back to England, in order to marry Mary Tolley, daughter of a wealthy Nottingham businessman; and they both returned to India again later that year, where he continued to travel around the country, producing some 500 more fine images. He departed Bombay for England permanently in November 1870. His work as travelling landscape and architectural photographer for Bourne & Shepherd studios was taken over by Colin Murray, who continued taking fine images of India, in a very similar style, and later went on to take over the management of the business.

Some time shortly after his return to England, he sold off his interests in Bourne and Shepherd studios, and from then on, had nothing more to do with commercial photography; however his archive of some 2,200 glass plate negatives remained with the studio, and were constantly re-printed and sold over the following 140 years, until their eventual destruction in a Calcutta fire on 6 February 1991.

== Return to England ==
Bourne settled back in Nottingham, where he founded a cotton-doubling business, in partnership with his brother-in-law J.B. Tolley. The business prospered, and Bourne become a local magistrate. Although continuing to photograph as a relaxation, and belonging to the local Photographic Society, much of his creative energy from this time onwards was devoted to watercolour. He died in Nottingham on 24 April 1912.

Bourne is regarded as one of the finest landscape and travel photographers of 19th-century India, combining a fine eye for composition with high technical expertise.

== Collections ==
Bourne's work is held in the permanent collections of several museums, including the Princeton University Art Museum, the Cambridge University Library, the Harvard Art Museums, the National Gallery of Art, Washington, DC, the Detroit Institute of Arts, the Clark Art Institute, the Museum of New Zealand Te Papa Tongarewa, the Museum of Modern Art, the Brooklyn Museum, the Victoria and Albert Museum, the Metropolitan Museum of Art, the University of Michigan Museum of Art, the Museum of Fine Arts, Houston, the National Galleries of Scotland, the J. Paul Getty Museum, and the San Francisco Museum of Modern Art.

== Gallery ==
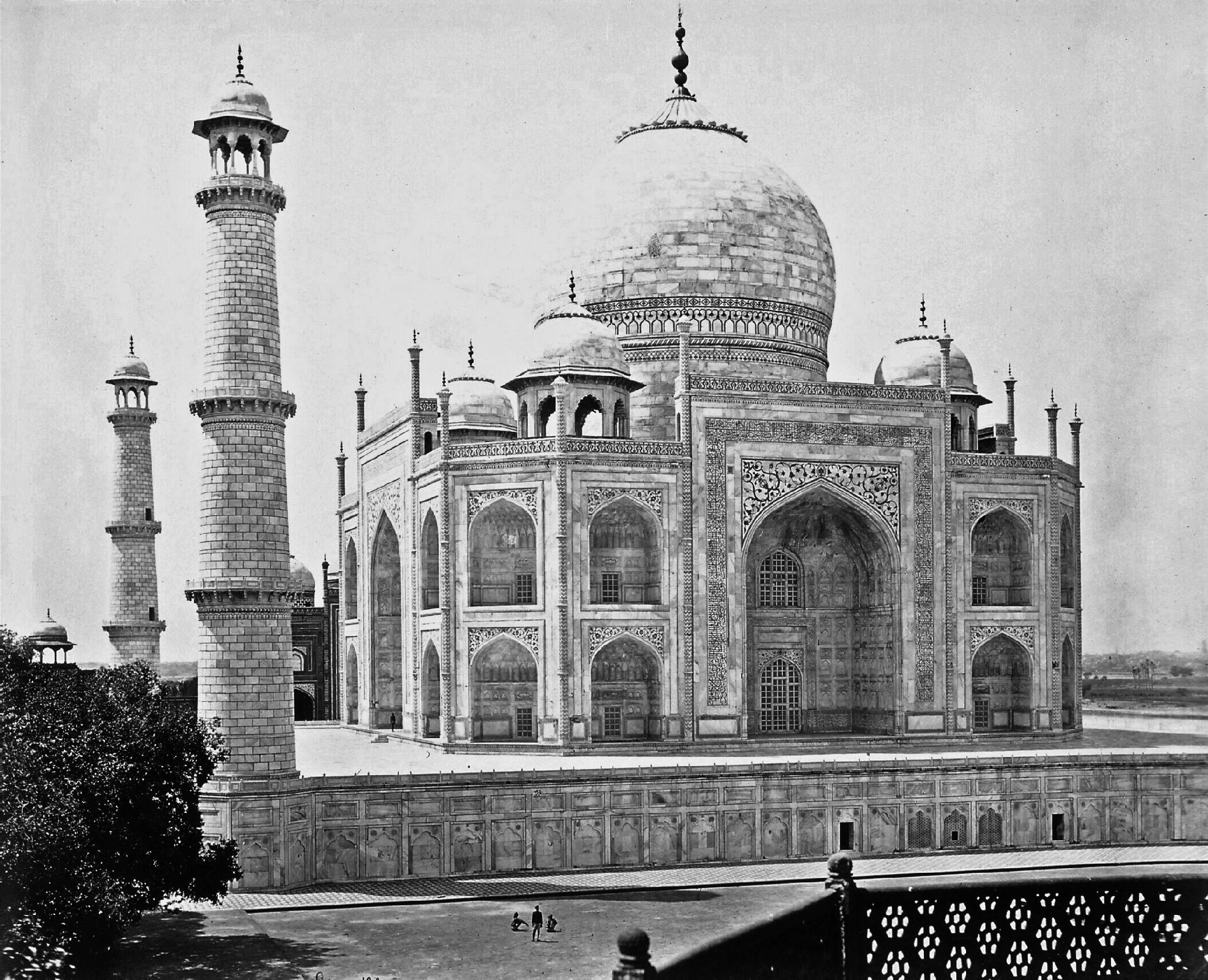
Photograph of the Taj Mahal. Samuel Bourne, 1860s.

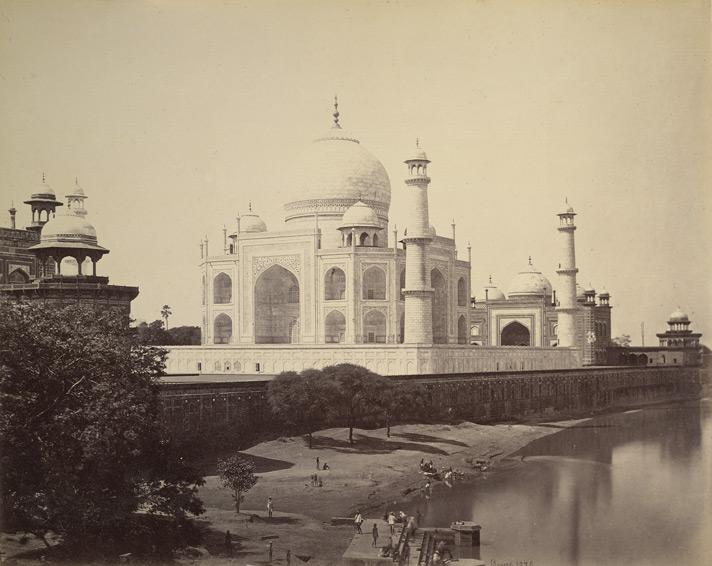
Photograph of the Taj Mahal from the river. Samuel Bourne, 1860.

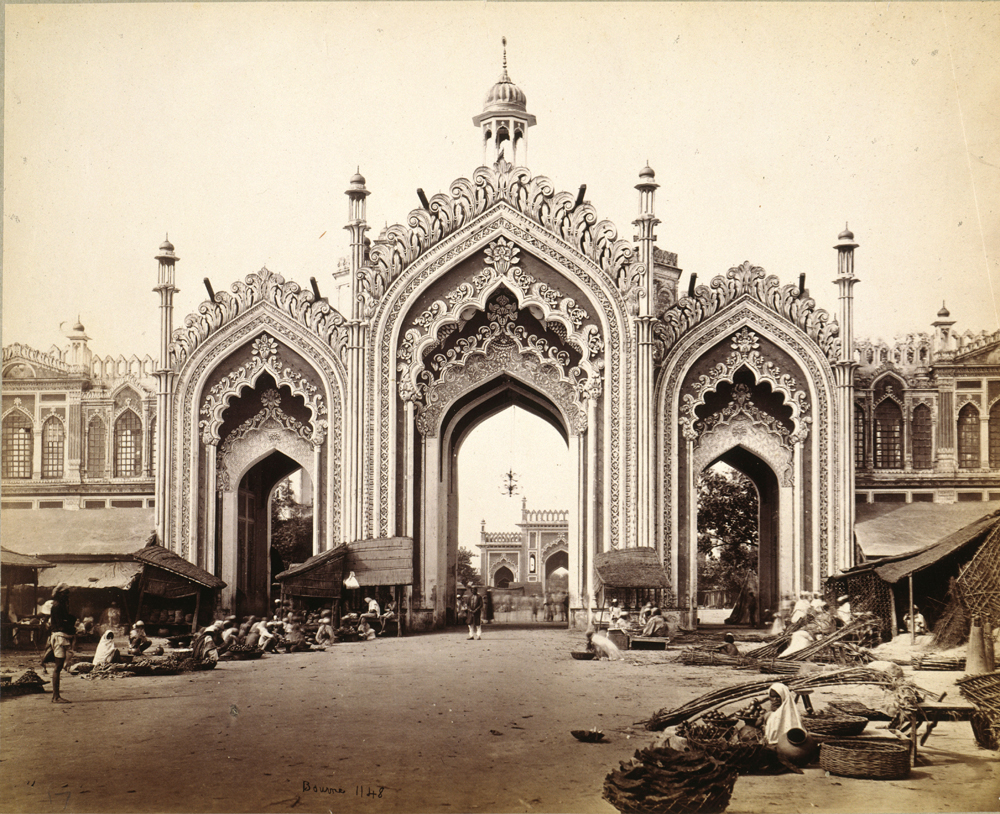
Gateway to the Hooseinabad Bazaar in Lucknow, 1863–66 V&A Museum no. 7-1972

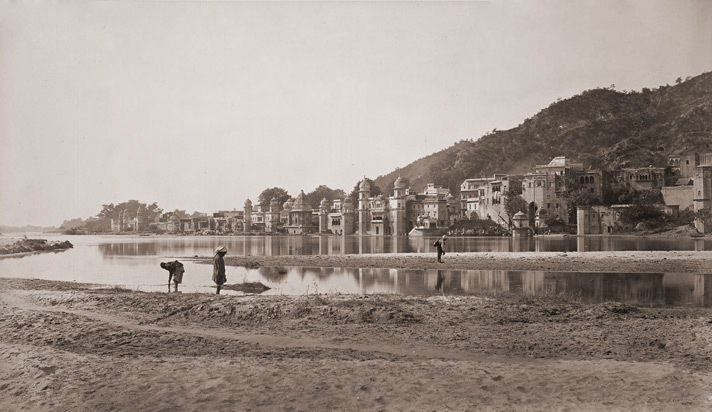
Haridwar from opposite bank of the Ganges, 1866.

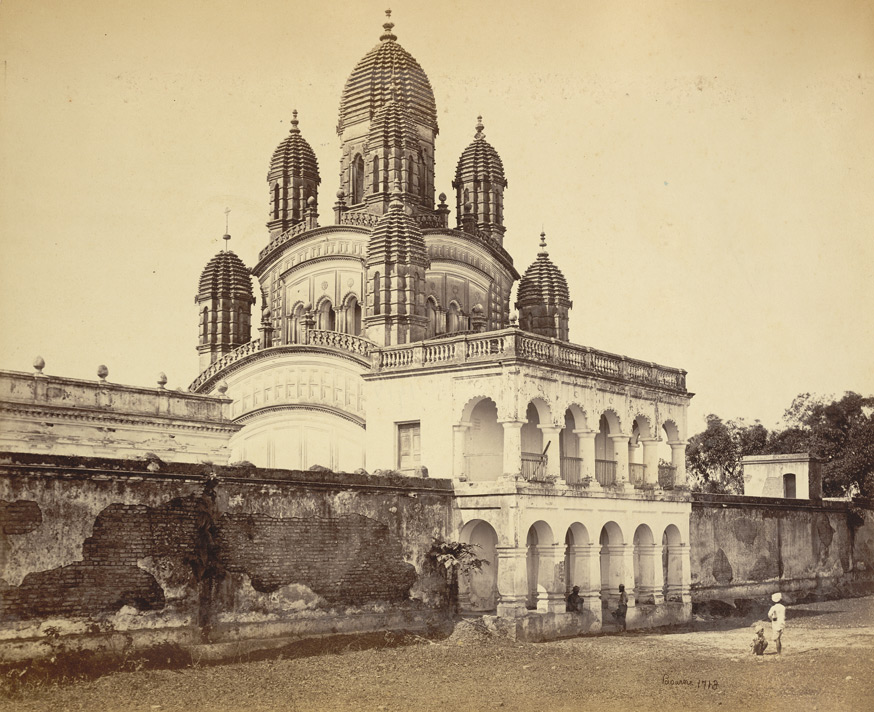
Photograph of Ramnath temple of Newalipore from Views of Calcutta and Barrackpore, taken by Samuel Bourne.

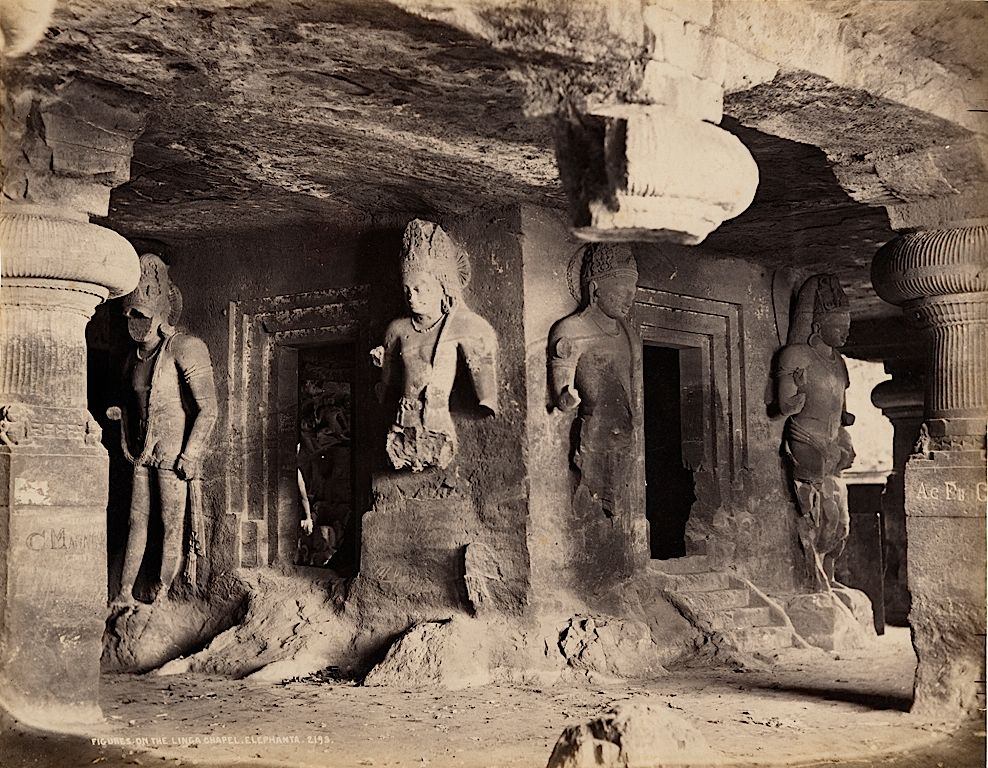
Samuel Bourne, "Plate Figures on the Linga Chapel. Elephanta," 1863–1869, photograph mounted on cardboard sheet

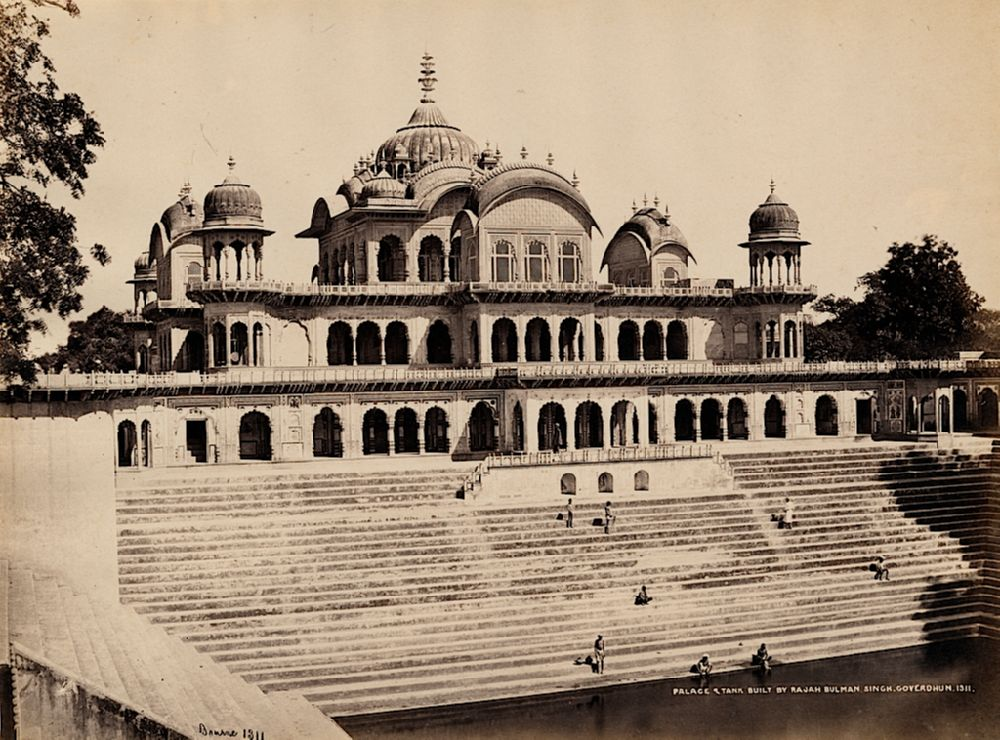
Samuel Bourne, "Palace & Tank. Built by Rajah Bulman Singh. Goverdhun 1311]," 1863–1869, photograph mounted on cardboard sheet

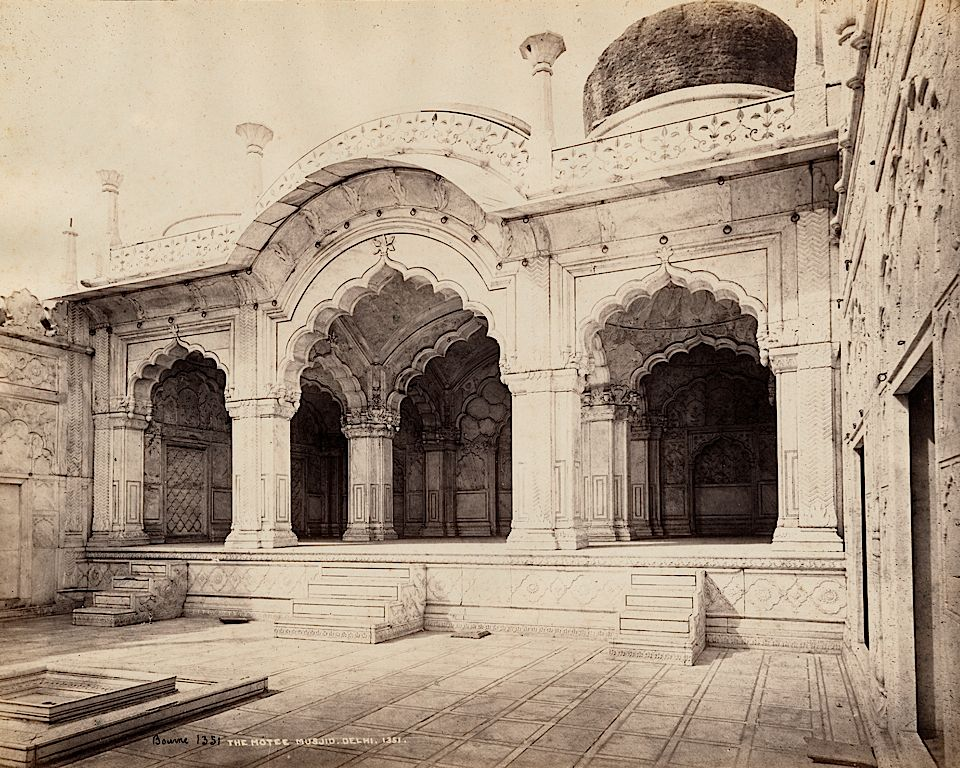
Samuel Bourne, "The Motee Musjid. Delhi. 1351," 1863–1869, photograph mounted on cardboard sheet

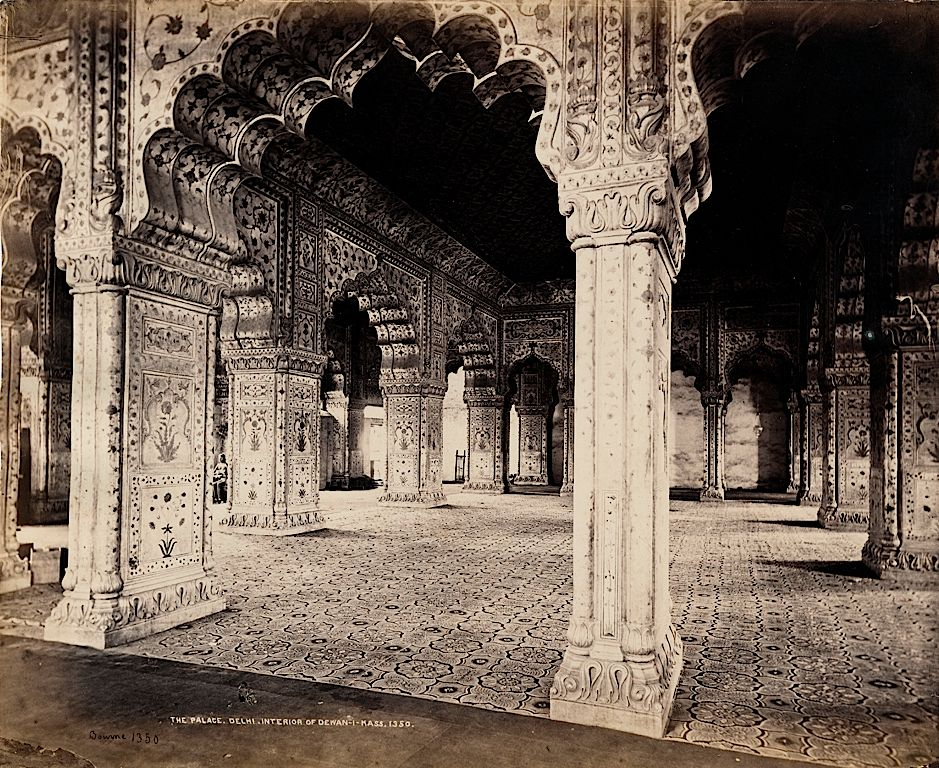
Samuel Bourne, "The Palace. Delhi. Interior of Dewan-i-Kass. 1350," 1863–1869, photograph mounted on cardboard sheet

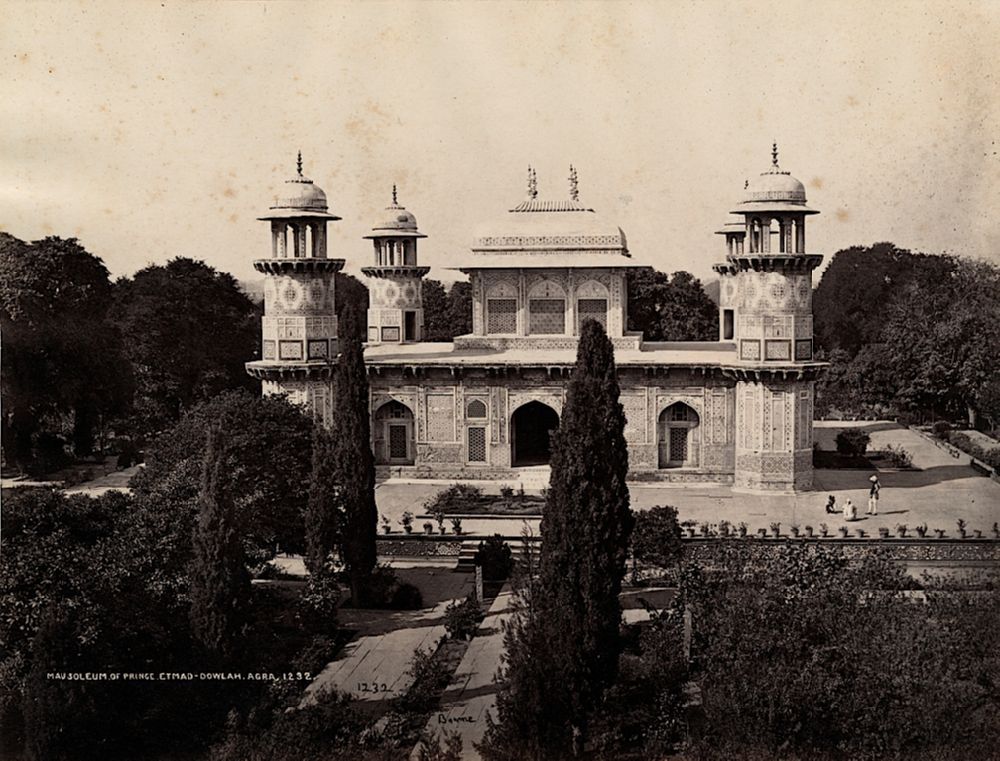
Samuel Bourne, "Mausoleum of Prince Etmad-Dowlah. Agra. 1232," 1863–1869, photograph mounted on cardboard sheet

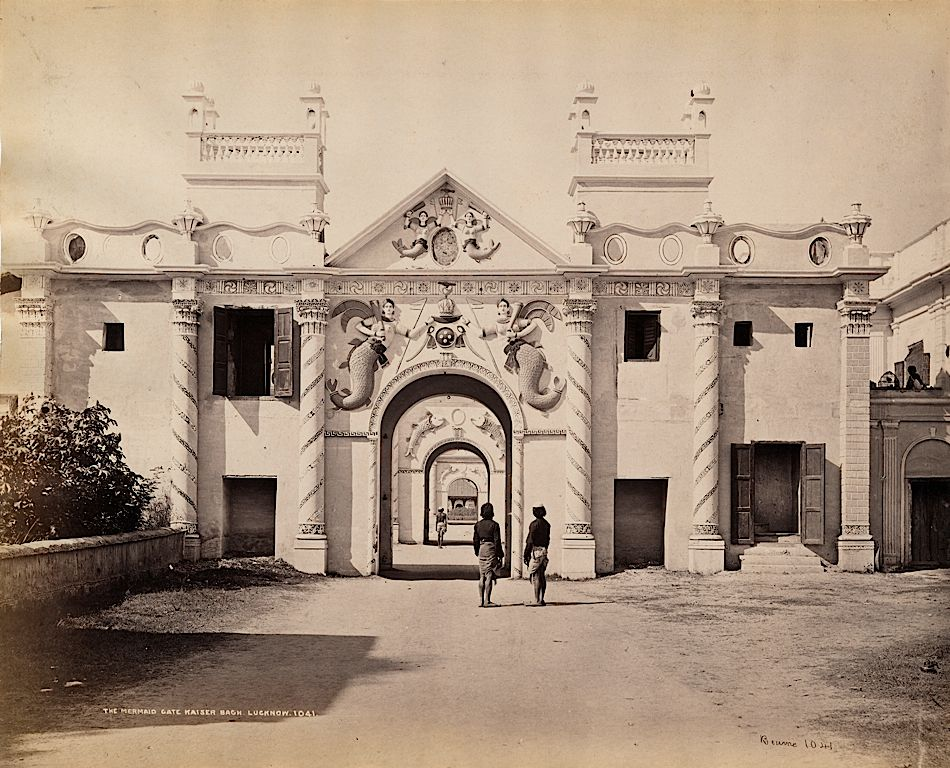
Samuel Bourne, "The Mermaid Gate, Kaiser Bagh. Lucknow, 1041," 1863–1869, photograph mounted on cardboard sheet

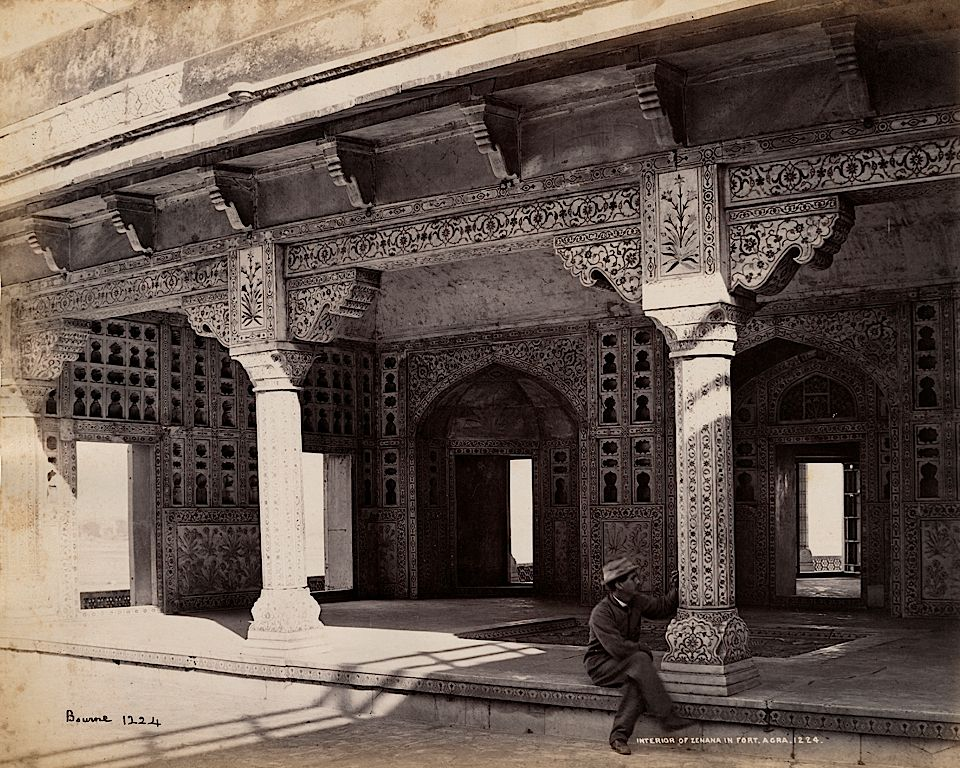
Samuel Bourne, "Interior of Zenana in Fort. Agra, 1224," 1863–1869, photograph mounted on cardboard sheet

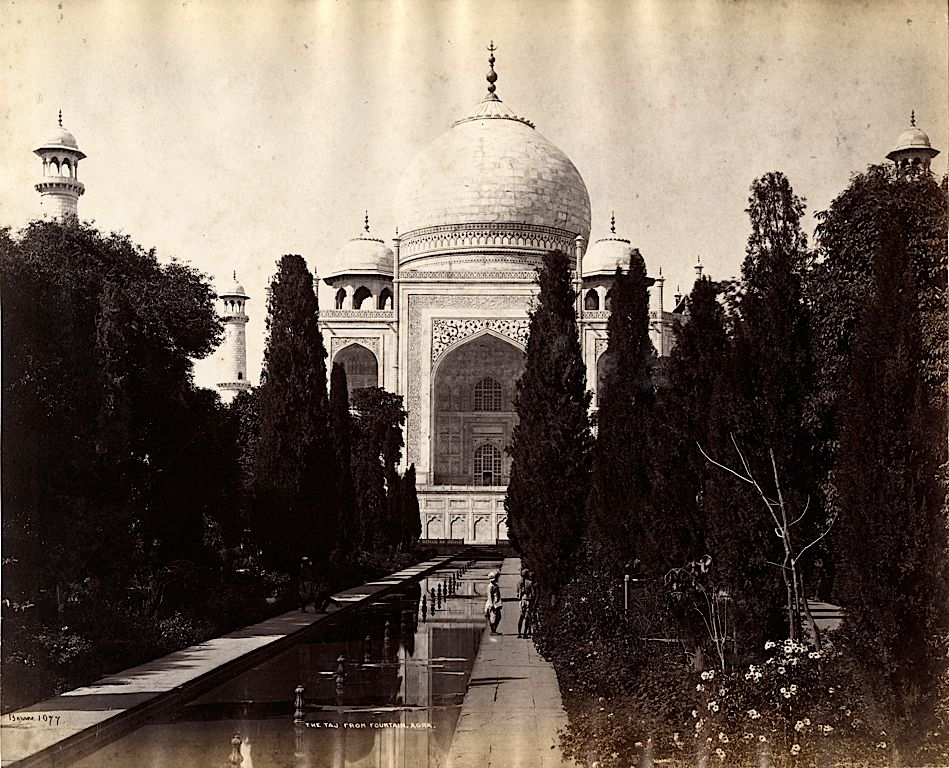
Samuel Bourne, "The Taj from Fountain. Agra," 1863–1869, photograph mounted on cardboard sheet

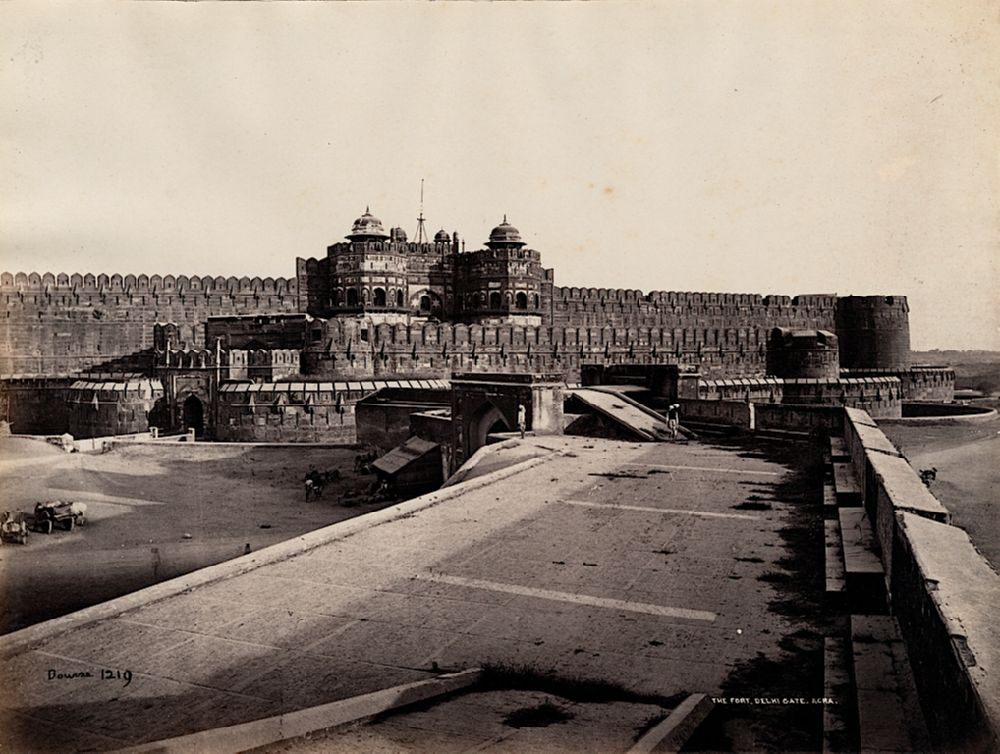
Samuel Bourne, "The Fort. Delhi Gate. Agra," 1863–1869, photograph mounted on cardboard sheet

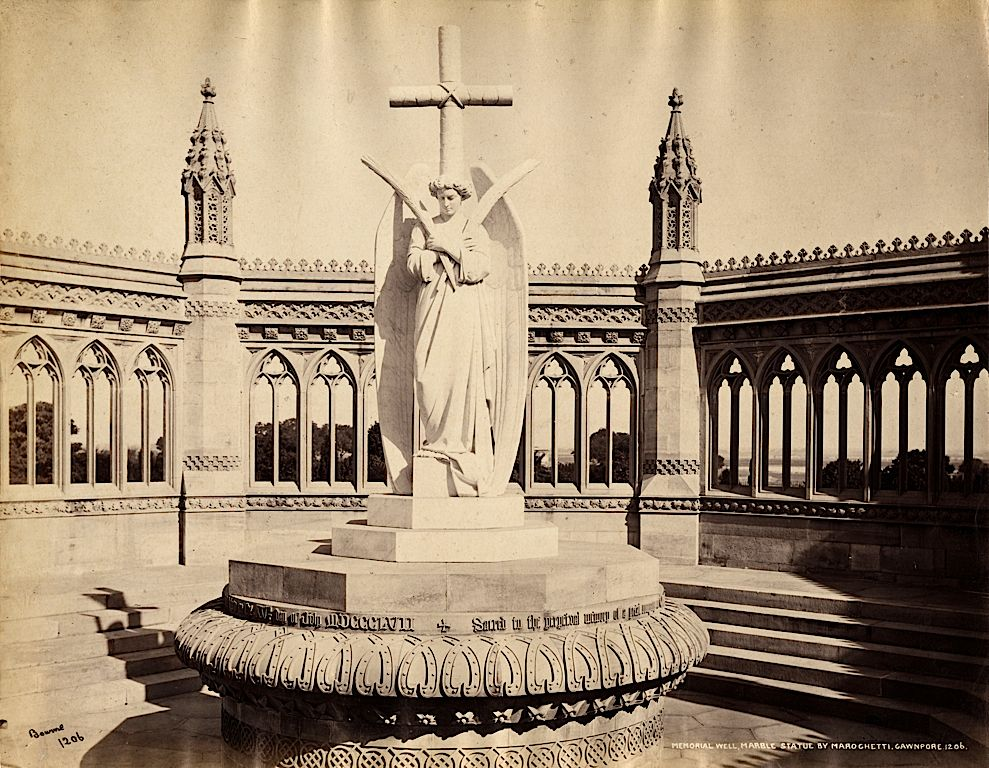
Samuel Bourne, "Memorial Well, Marble Statue by Marochetti. Cawnpore, 1206," 1863–1869, photograph mounted on cardboard sheet

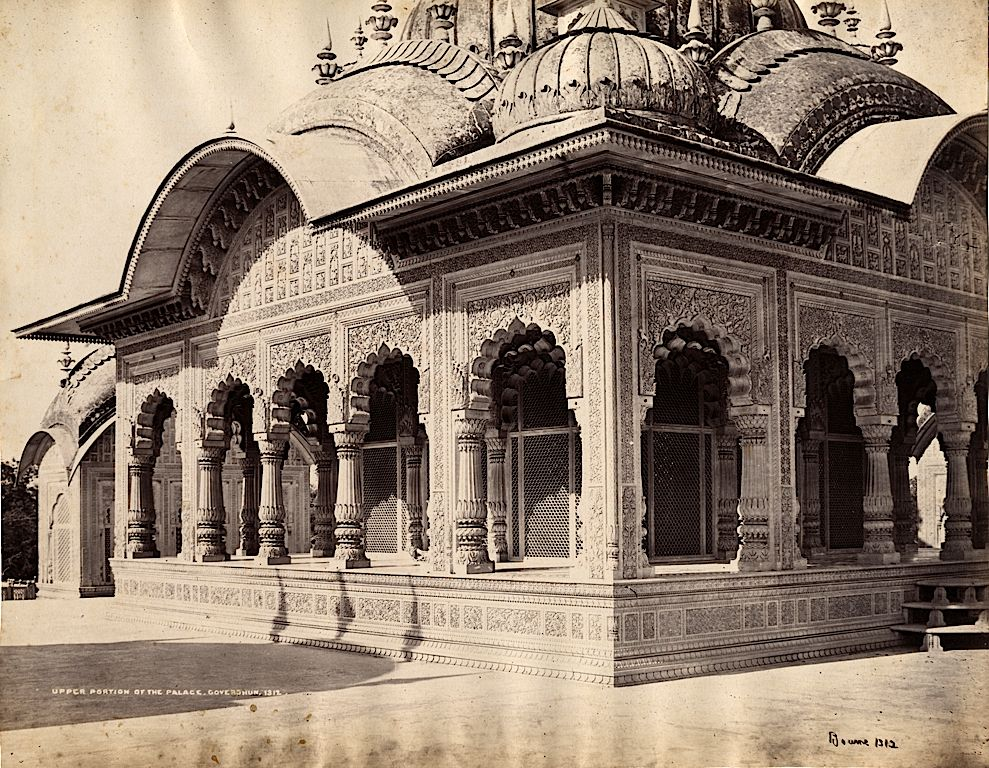
Samuel Bourne, "Upper Portion of the Palace, Goverdhun, 1312," 1863–1869, photograph mounted on cardboard sheet

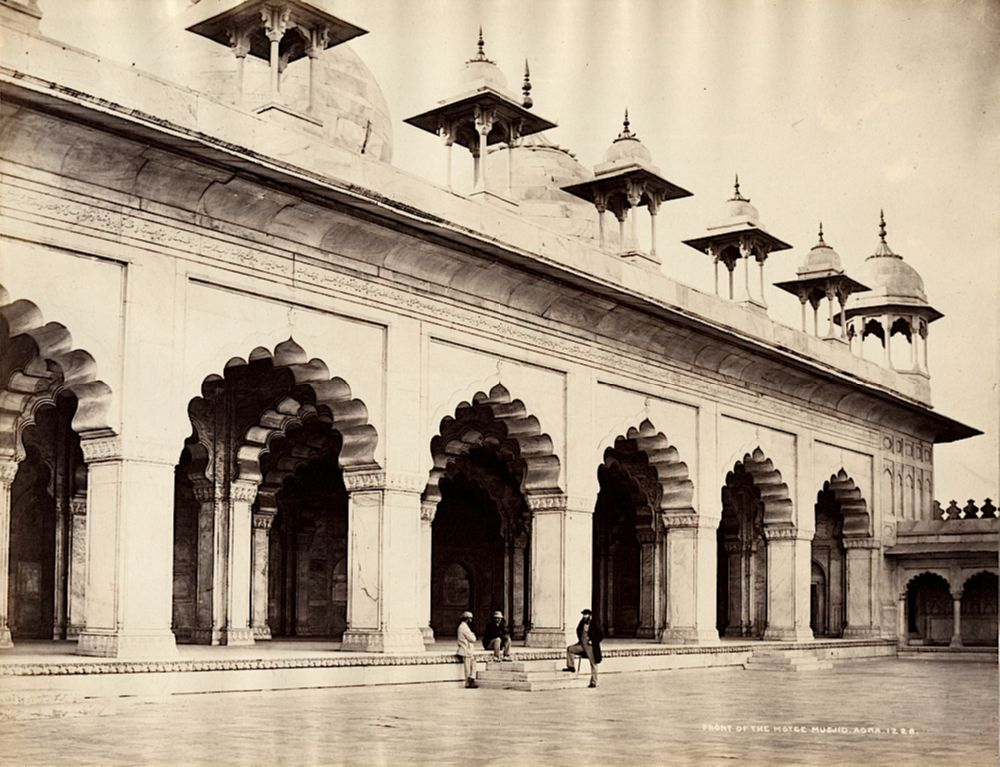
Samuel Bourne, "Front of the Motee Musjid, Agra, 1220," 1863–1869, photograph mounted on cardboard sheet

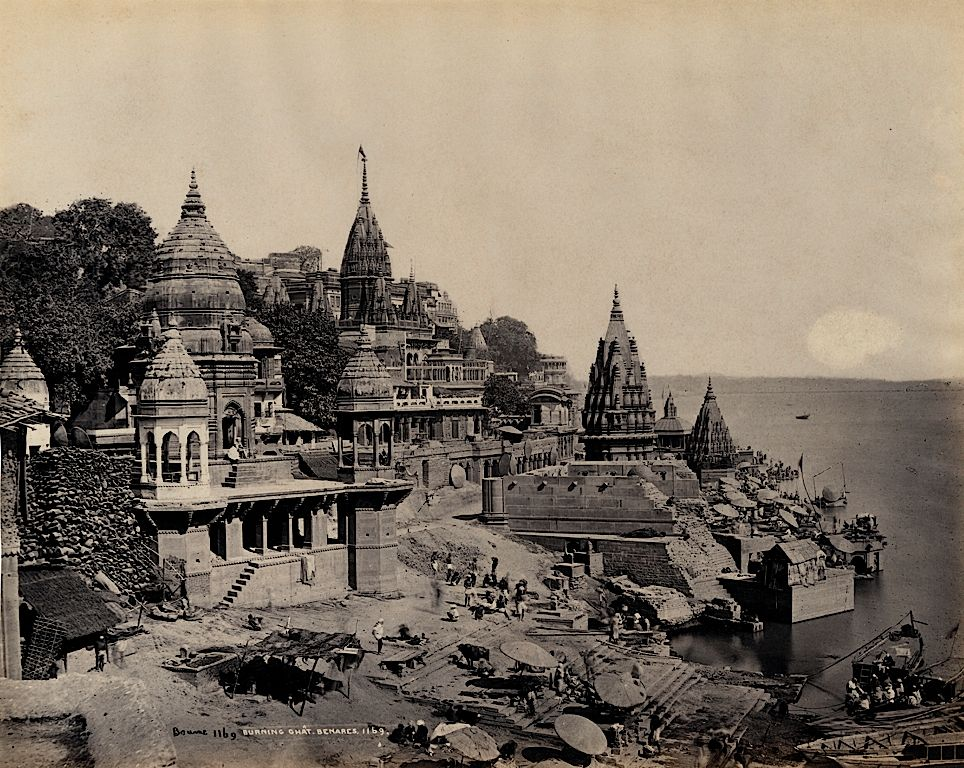
Samuel Bourne, "Burning Ghat, Benares, 1169," 1863–1869, photograph mounted on cardboard sheet

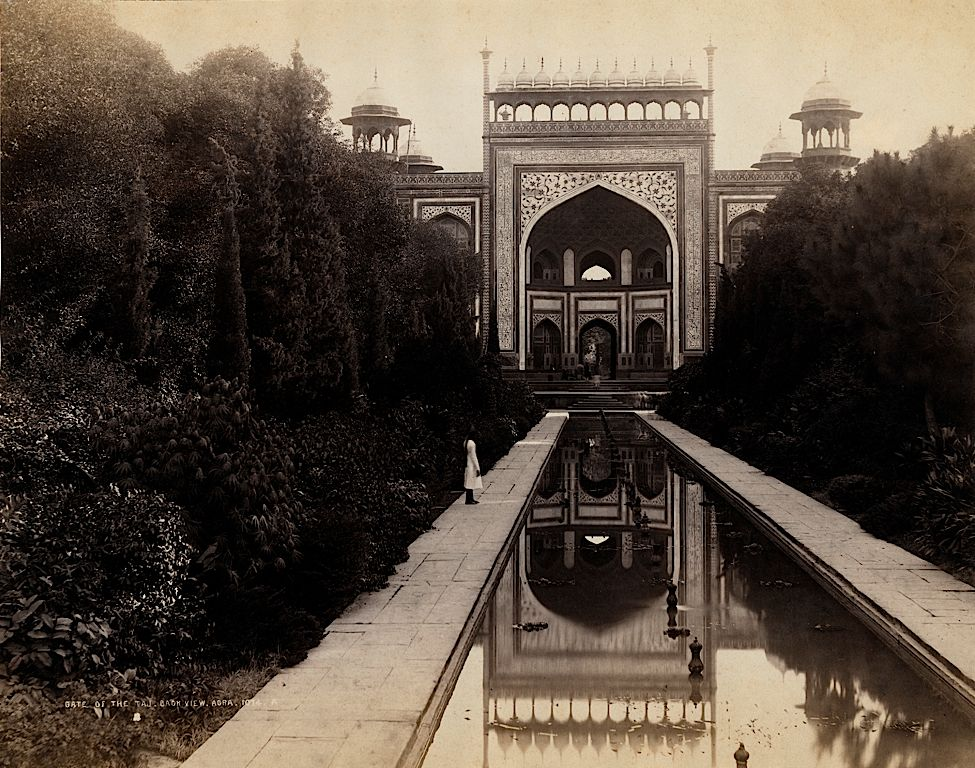
Samuel Bourne, "Gate of the Taj. Bagh View. Agra. 1014," 1863–1869, photograph mounted on cardboard sheet

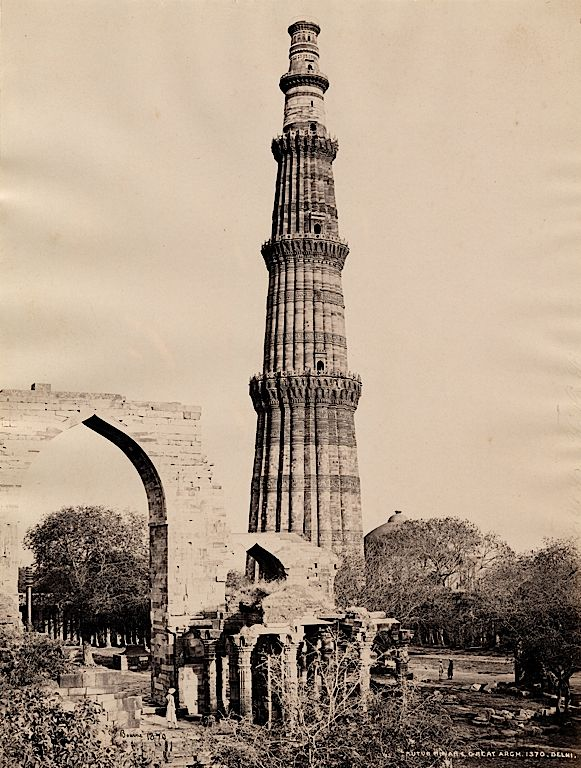
Samuel Bourne, "Views of India, Plate 22," 1863–1869, photograph mounted on cardboard sheet

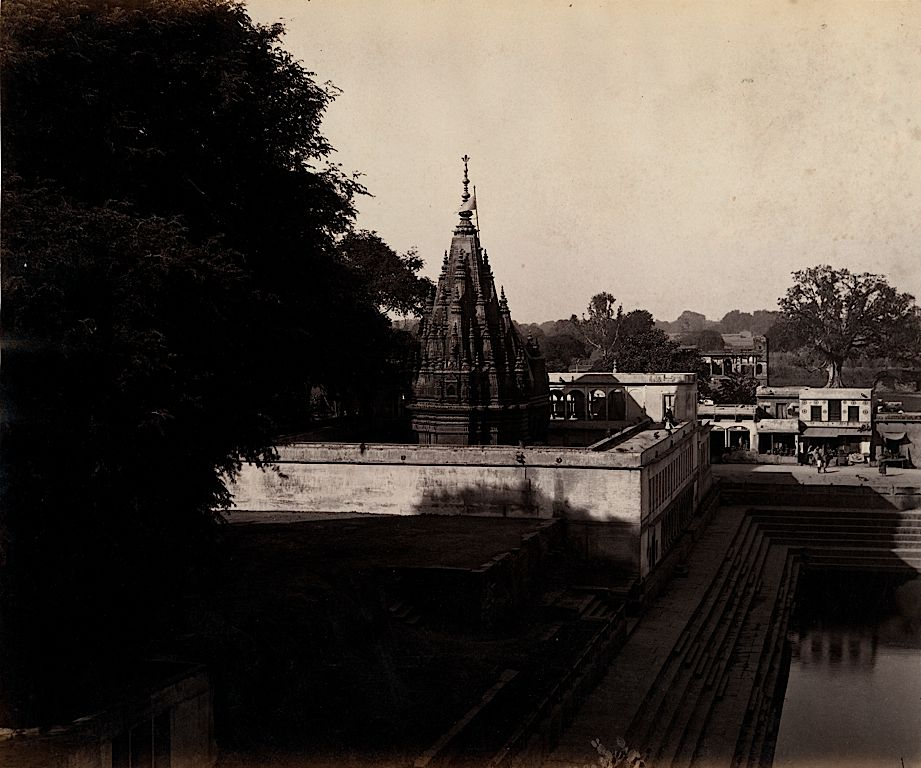
Samuel Bourne, "Views of India, Plate 21," 1863–1869, photograph mounted on cardboard sheet

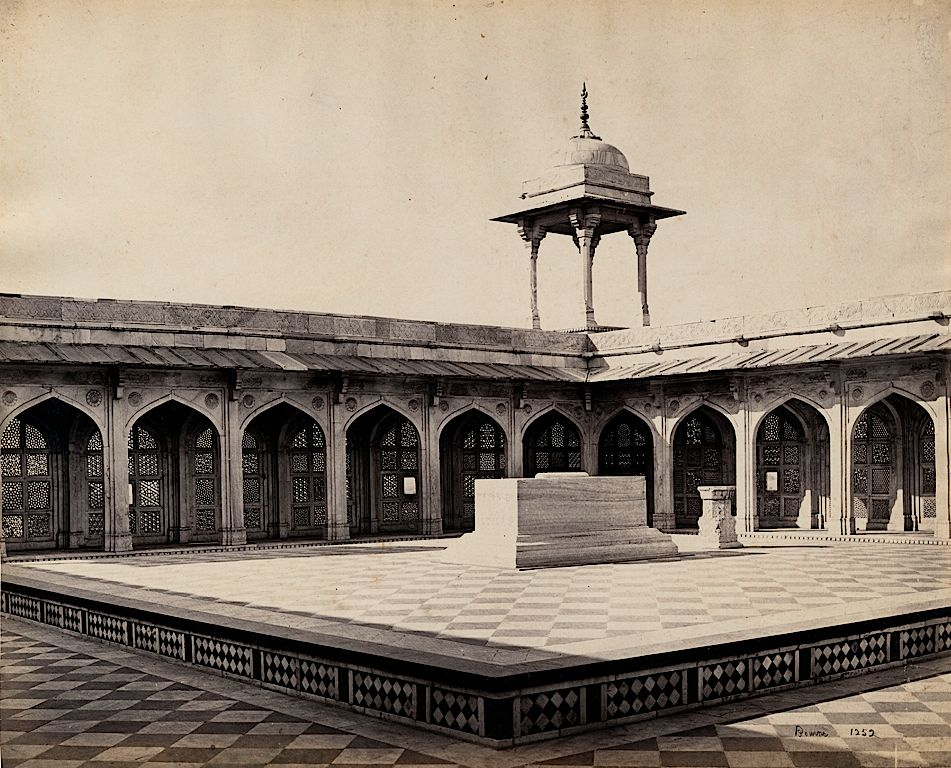
Samuel Bourne, "Views of India, Plate 18," 1863–1869, photograph mounted on cardboard sheet

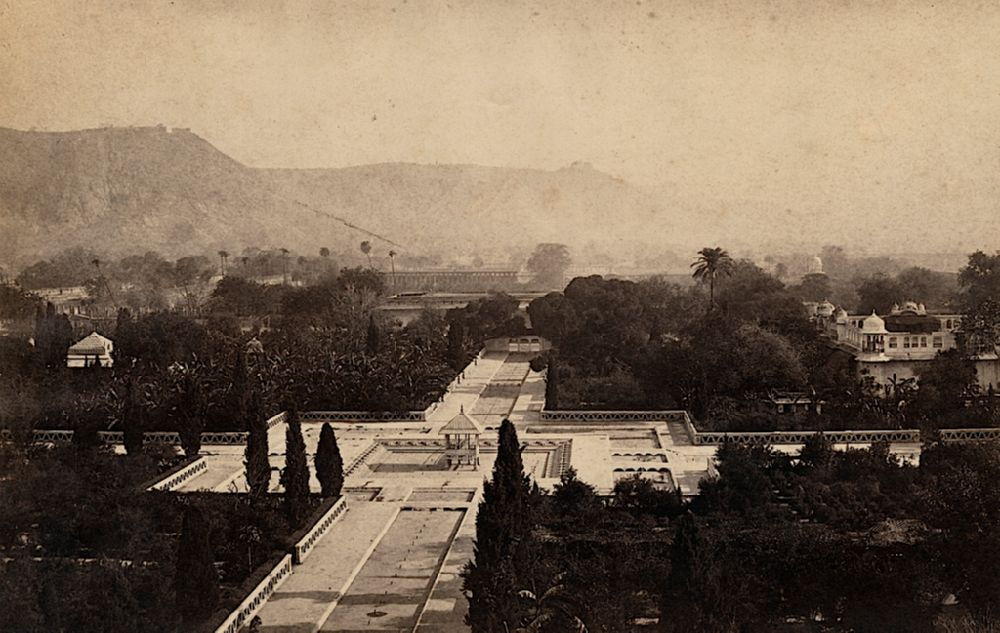
Samuel Bourne, "Views of India, Plate 17," 1863–1869, photograph mounted on cardboard sheet

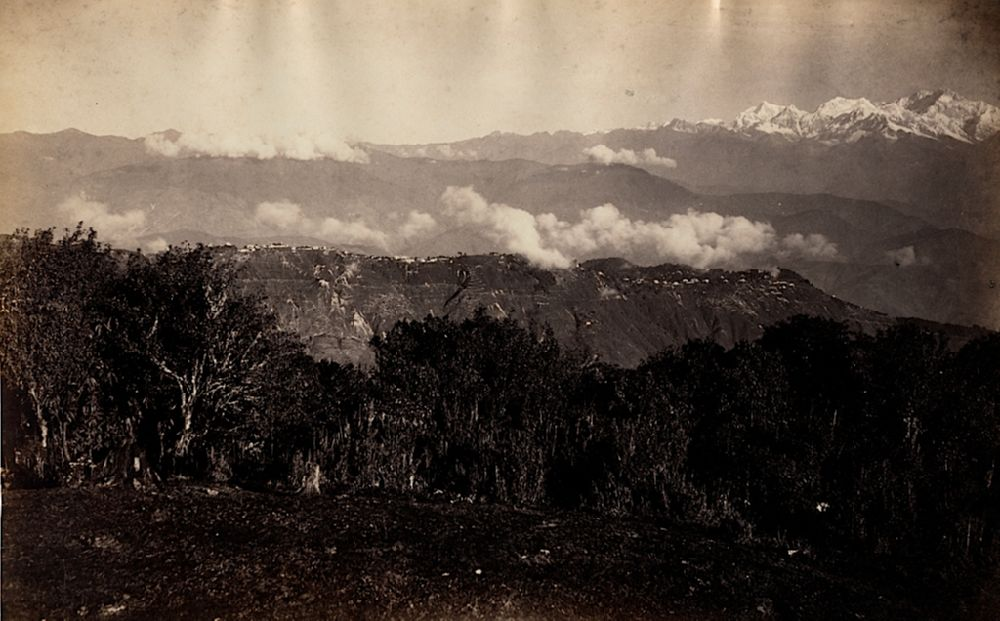
Samuel Bourne, "Views of India, Plate 15," 1863–1869, photograph mounted on cardboard sheet

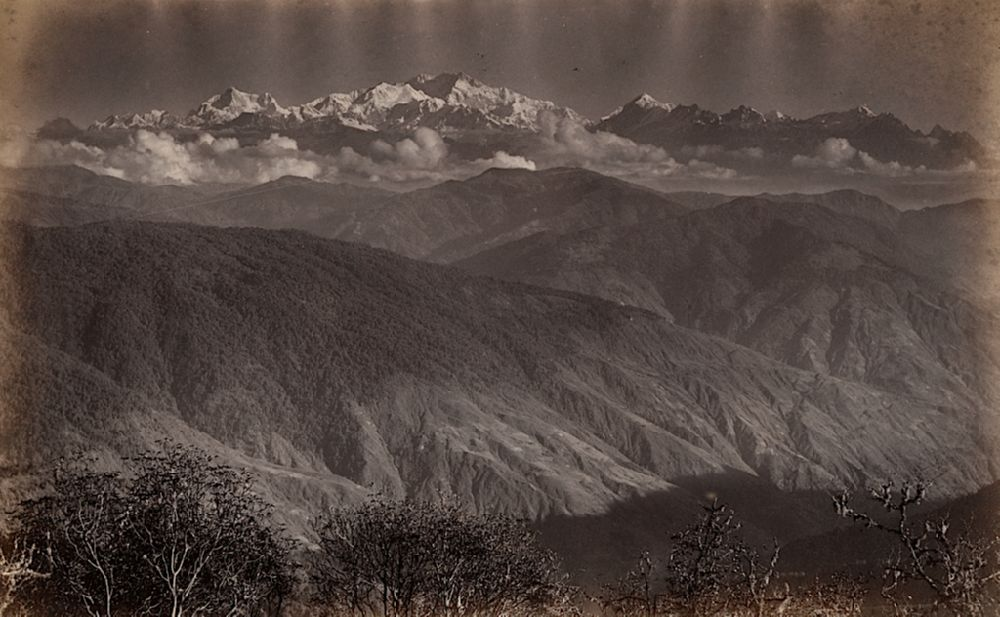
Samuel Bourne, "Views of India, Plate 14," 1863–1869, photograph mounted on cardboard sheet

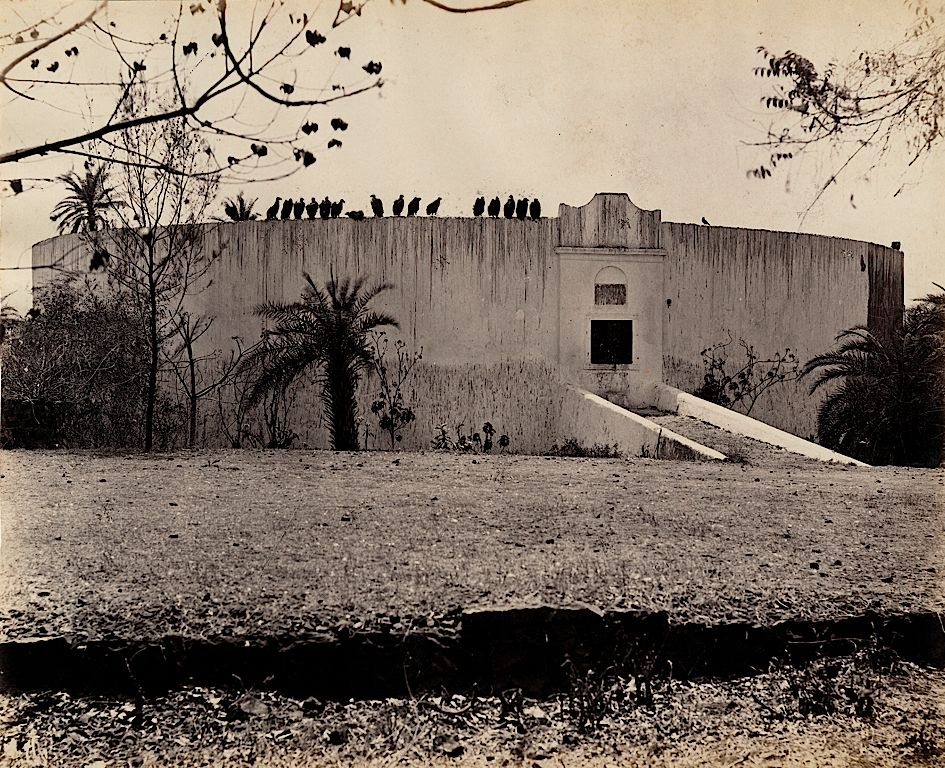
Samuel Bourne, "Views of India, Plate 12," 1863–1869, photograph mounted on cardboard sheet

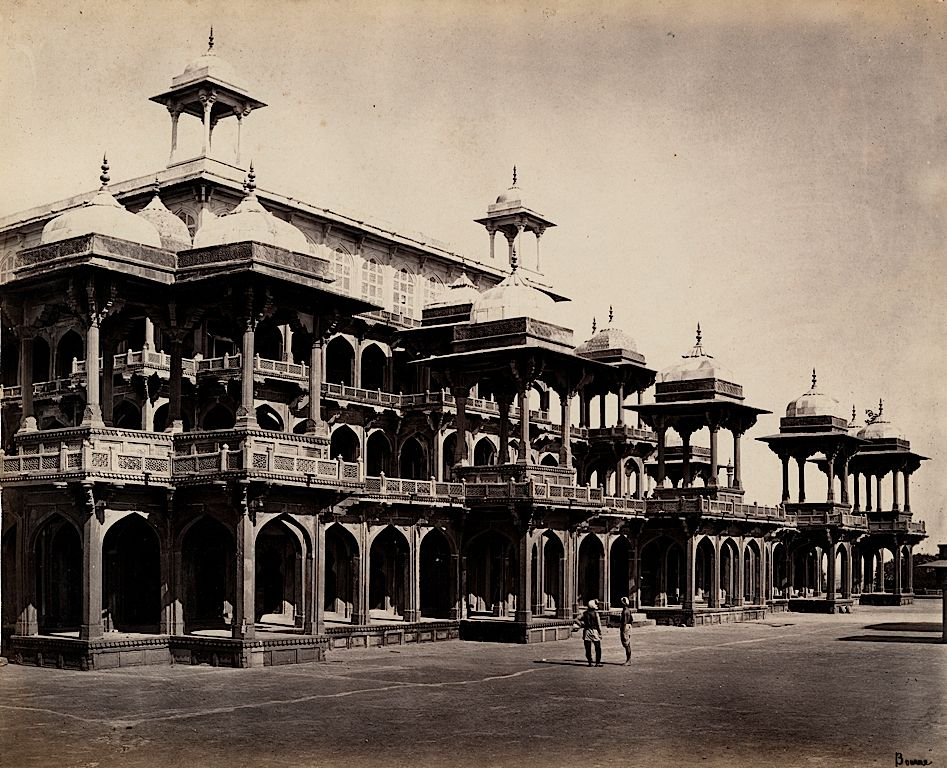
Samuel Bourne, "Views of India, Plate 11," 1863–1869, photograph mounted on cardboard sheet

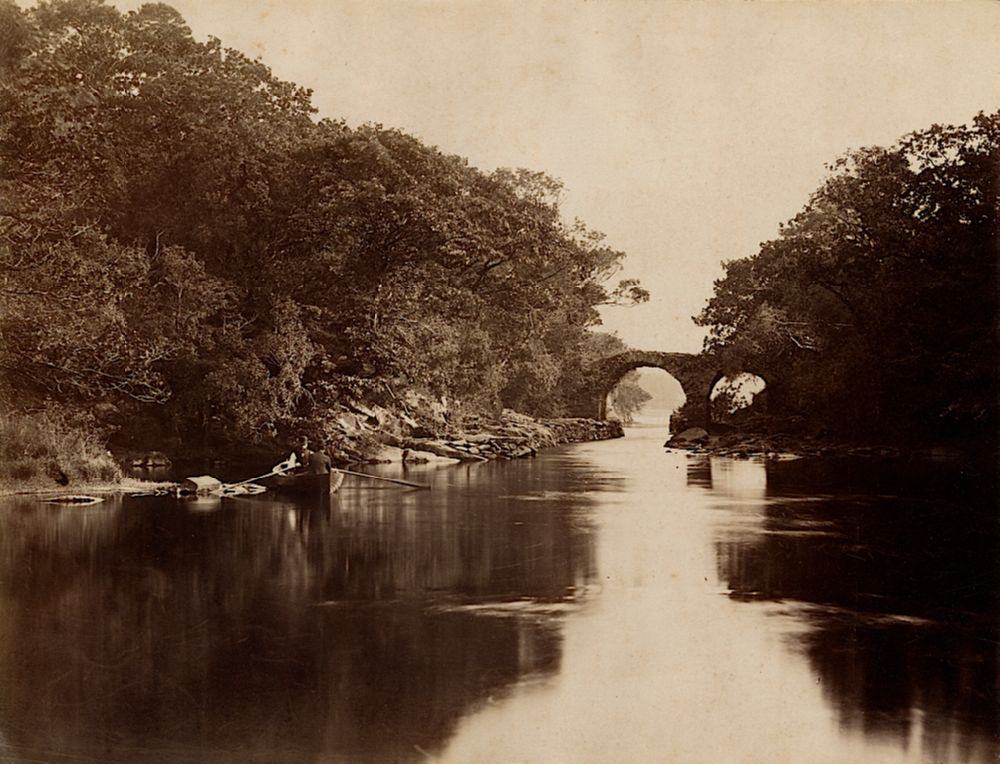
Samuel Bourne, "Views of India, Plate 9," 1863–1869, photograph mounted on cardboard sheet

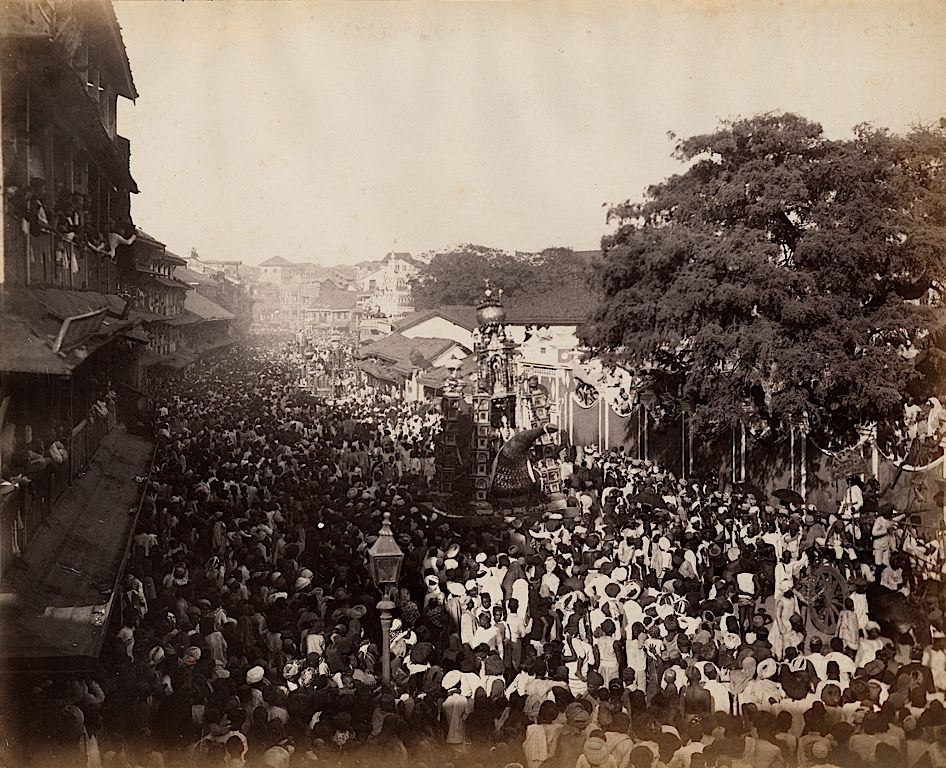
Samuel Bourne, "Views of India, Plate 8," 1863–1869, photograph mounted on cardboard sheet

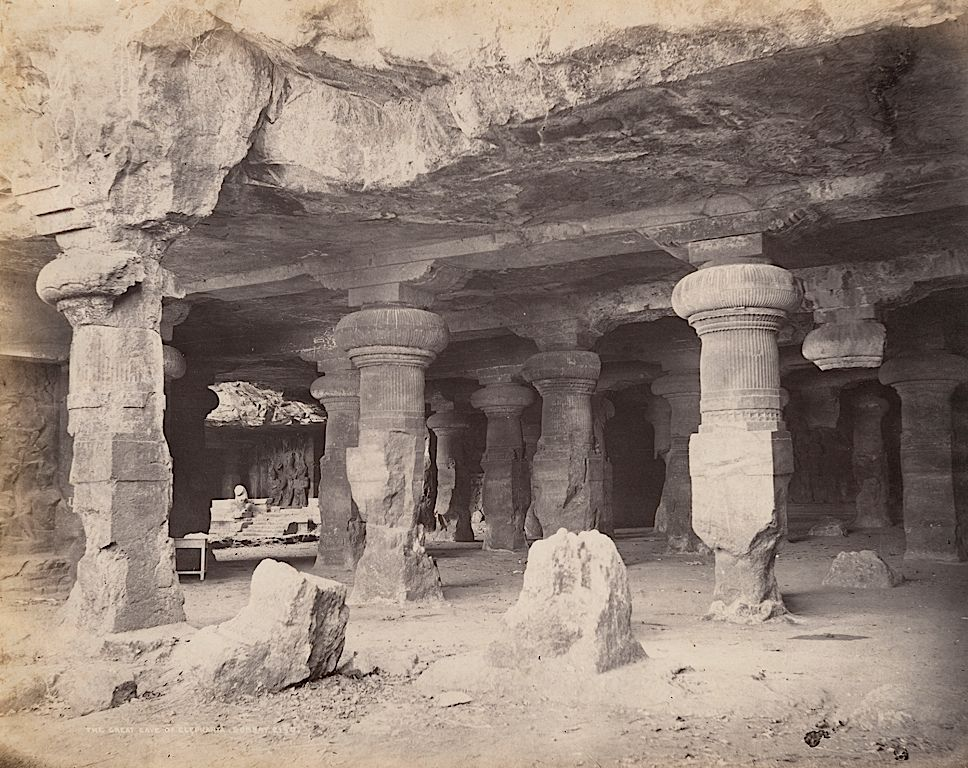
Samuel Bourne, "Views of India, Plate 5," 1863–1869, photograph mounted on cardboard sheet

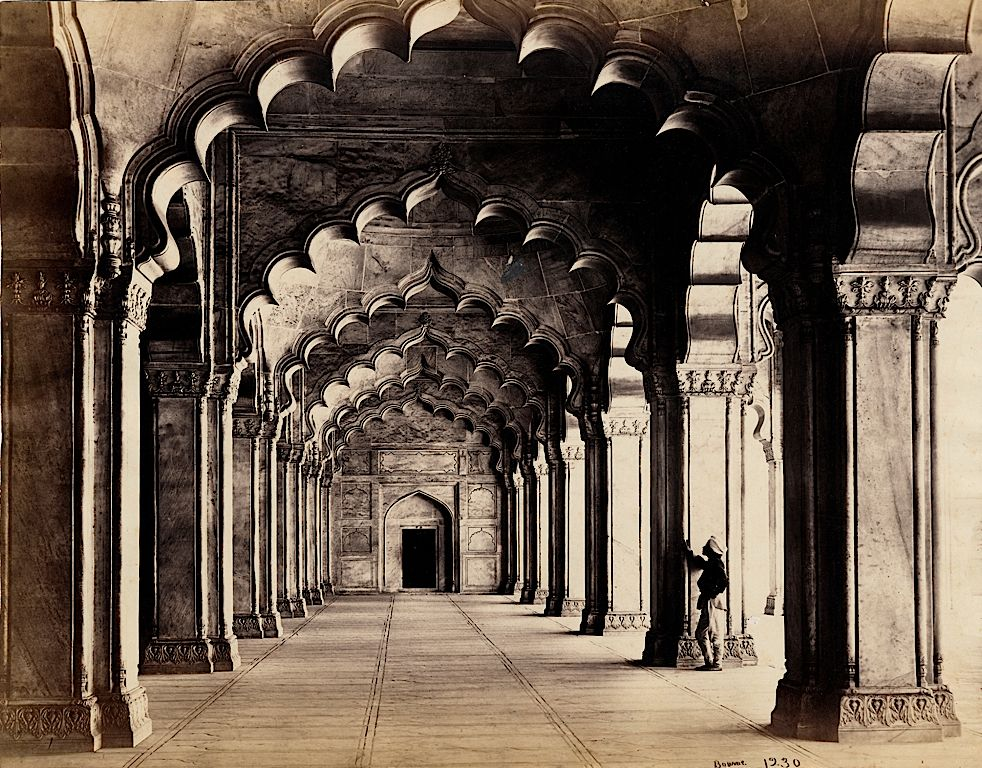
Samuel Bourne, "Views of India, Plate 3," 1863–1869, photograph mounted on cardboard sheet

== See also ==
- John Burke (photographer)
- Frederick Fiebig
- Linnaeus Tripe
