= Bourne & Shepherd =

Indian photographic studio

Bourne & Shepherd was an Indian photographic studio and one of the oldest established photographic businesses in the world. Established in 1863, at its peak, it was the most successful commercial firm in 19th-and early 20th-century India, with agencies all over India, and outlets in London and Paris, and also ran a mail order service. A devastating fire in 1991 destroyed much of the studio's photographic archive and resulted in a severe financial loss to the firm. The long-term impact of the fire, legal difficulties with the Indian government, which owned the studio building, and the increasing dominance of digital technology, finally forced the studio's closure in June 2016. At its closure, the studio had operated continuously for 176 years.

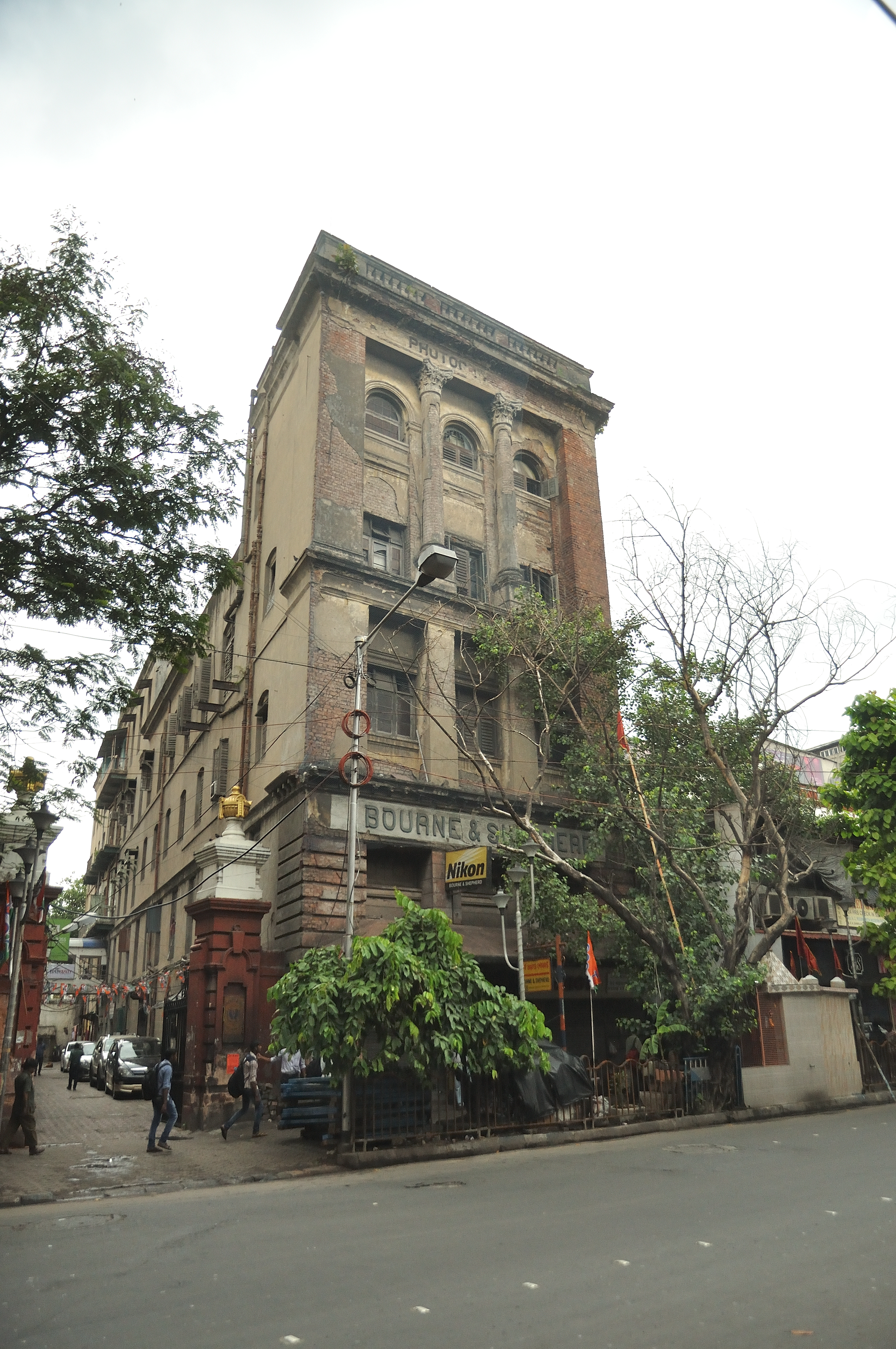
The Bourne & Shepherd studio in Esplanade, Kolkata, 2011.

== History ==
Some sources consider its inception to be 1862, when noted British photographer Charles Shepherd established a photographic studio, with Arthur Robertson, called 'Shepherd & Robertson' in Agra, which later moved to Shimla and eventually became the part of ‘Howard, Bourne & Shepherd’, set up by Samuel Bourne, Charles Shepherd, along with William Howard. It is currently permanently closed and is located here. First established in Shimla around 1863, Howard's studio in Kolkata dates back to 1840, at Esplanade Row, in Esplanade, Kolkata (Calcutta Today some of their earlier work is preserved at Cambridge University Library, the National Portrait Gallery, London, the National Geographic Society's Image Collection and the Smithsonian Institution.

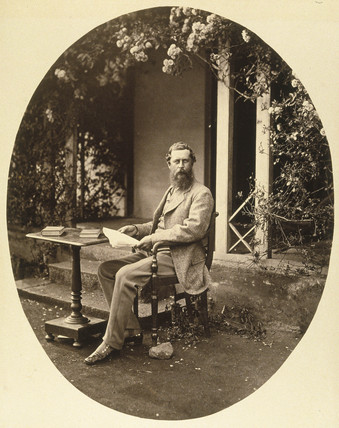
Samuel Bourne, one of the founders in an 1864 portrait

Samuel Bourne came to India in 1863, and set up a partnership with the Calcutta photographer William Howard, and they set up a new studio Howard & Bourne at Shimla. Meanwhile Charles Shepherd had already established a photographic studio, with Arthur Robertson, called Shepherd & Robertson in Agra in 1862, and subsequently he too moved to Shimla in 1864. At some point Robertson left the business and Charles Shepherd joined the company to form Howard, Bourne & Shepherd. In 1863, he made first of three major Himalayan photographic expeditions, followed by another one 1866, prior to which he took an expedition to Kashmir in 1864, in fact all photographic histories of that era carry his works. He was known to travel heavy, as he moved with a large retinue of 42 coolies carried his cameras, darkroom tent and chests of chemicals and glass plates, he was to become one of India's greatest photographers of that era. Charles on the other hand became known as a master printer, he stayed back in Shimla and managed the commercial distribution and printing aspects of the business. Through the 1860s, Bourne's work was exhibited in public exhibition in Europe and was also part of the Paris Universal Exposition in 1867. He also wrote several despatches for 'The British Journal of Photography between' 1863–1870, and the company became an avid provider of the Indian landscape views to the common visitors to the country and also to Britishers back home, and not just survived but the thrived in an era of fierce competition between commercial photographers.

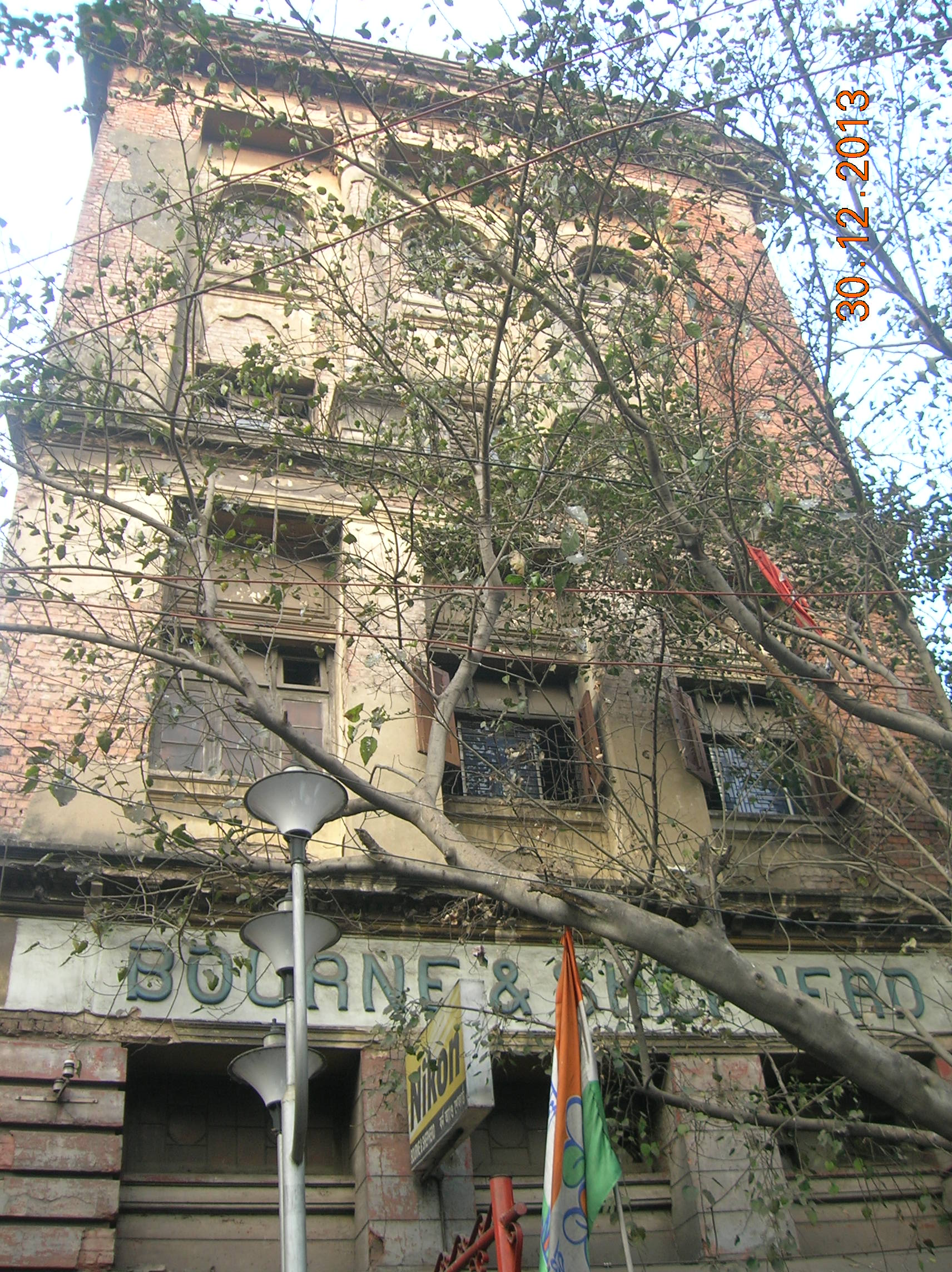
Bourne & Shepherd – the oldest photo studio in the world – 1840

In 1866 after the departure of Howard, the company became 'Bourne & Shepherd'. In 1867 Bourne returned to England briefly to get married and came back to run the new branch in Calcutta. Soon it became the company premier photographic studios in India. At their peak their work was widely retailed throughout the subcontinent by agents and in Britain through wholesale distributors, and were patronised by the upper echelons of the British Raj as well as Indian royalty, so much so that at one point no official engagement, investiture or local durbar was considered complete without being first captured Bourne & Shepherd photographers.

In 1870, the year when Bourne went back to England, Bourne and Shepherd were operating from Shimla and Calcutta. Soon he started cotton-doubling business at Nottingham, and founded the Britannia Cotton Mills, and also become a local magistrate. He sold off his shares in studios, and left commercial photography all together; we also left behind his archive of some 2,200 glass plate negatives with the studio, which were constantly re-printed and sold, over the following 140 years, until their eventual destruction, in a fire at Bourne & Shepherd's present studio in Calcutta, on 6 February 1991. After Bourne's departure, new photographic work was undertaken by Colin Murray from 1840 to 84, following which in the 1870s Charles Shepherd continued to photograph and at least sixteen Europeans are listed as assistants.

Later the Bombay branch was opened in about 1876, operated by Charles Shepherd until his own departure from India around 1879, the branch continued operations till about 1902. In 1880, they even brought their services to as far as Lahore for a month, where they advertised in a local newspaper, in fact newspaper advertising has been a primary reason of the success of many photographers of that era. Soon their work was widely retailed throughout the subcontinent by agents and in Britain through wholesale distributors. Between 1870 and 1911 the firm sent photographers to Ceylon (Sri Lanka), Burma, Nepal and Singapore, had also become Art Publishers, with titles like 'Photographs of Architecture of Gujarat and Rajputana' (1904–05), and were now employing Indian photographers as well.

In 1911, they were the official photographers of the Delhi Durbar held to commemorate the coronation of King George V and Queen Mary as Emperor and Empress of India, where they were given the title, 'Kaiser-e-Hind' which they still use as part of their official letterhead. During World Wars the studio thrived on the contracts for photographing Indian, British and American services personnel.

In the following years, the studio changed hands several times, so much so the sequence of owners has been all but lost, however the last European owner, Arthur Musselwhite who took over the studio in the 1930s, later after a major business slump following the independence of India, and exodus of European community and the end of princely states, he held an auction in 1955, in which it was bought over by its present owners, and today the building itself is a heritage property.

== Reception ==
In a 2009 auction by Bonhams in London, sixteen views and portraits taken in British Burma between 1860 and 1900 by photographers working for Bourne and Shepherd [Colin Murray], J. Jackson and Lawton, on albumen and gelatin silver prints, were sold for US-$540. Among these were portraits of a Burmese gentleman and of girls dressing their hair as well as views depicting two men tied up by the Irrawaddy river in a scene of public punishment.

== Gallery ==
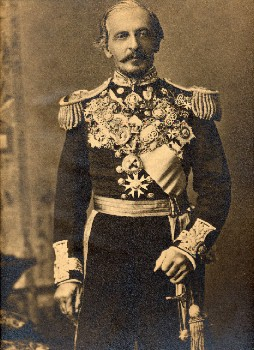
Lord Dufferin, in the regalia of the Viceroy of India, by Bourne & Shepherd, Calcutta

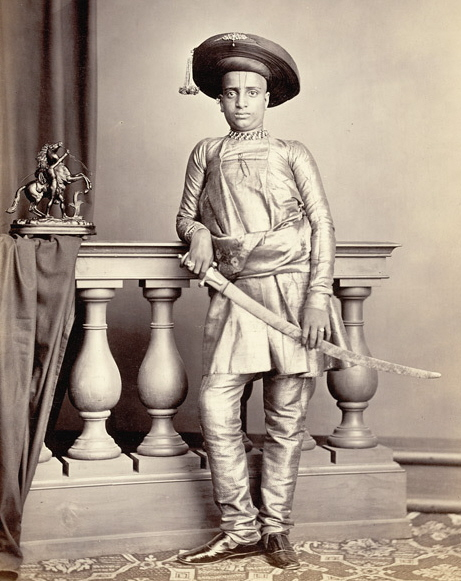
Son of H.H. Chunnasee Rajoonath Pant, by Bourne and Shepherd, late 1860s, the Archaeological Survey of India Collections

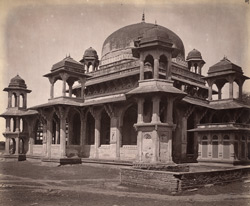
Tomb of Muhammad Ghaus at Gwalior, Madhya Pradesh, taken by Bourne & Shepherd c. 1883, from the Archaeological Survey of India Collections

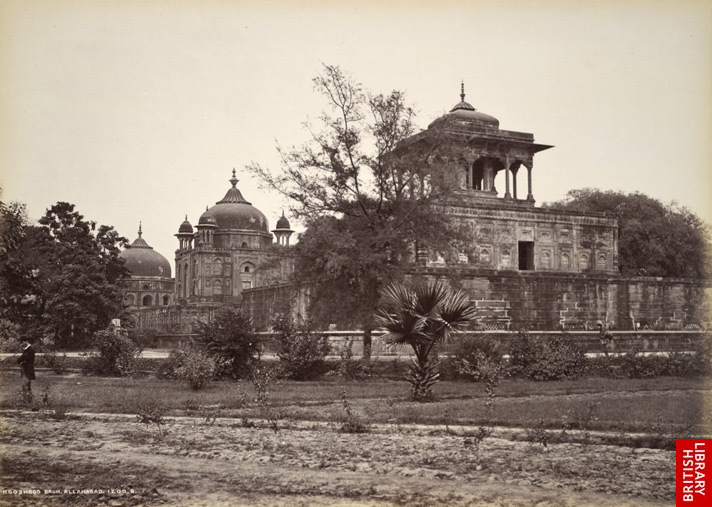
Khusro Bagh, Allahabad, 1870s

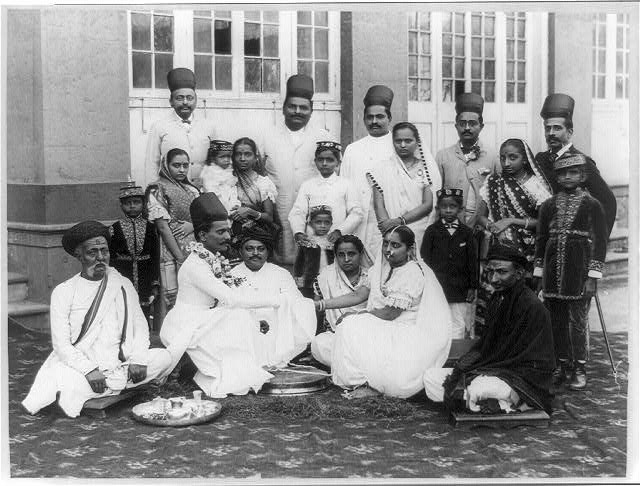
Parsi Marriage, Bourne & Shepherd, Bombay

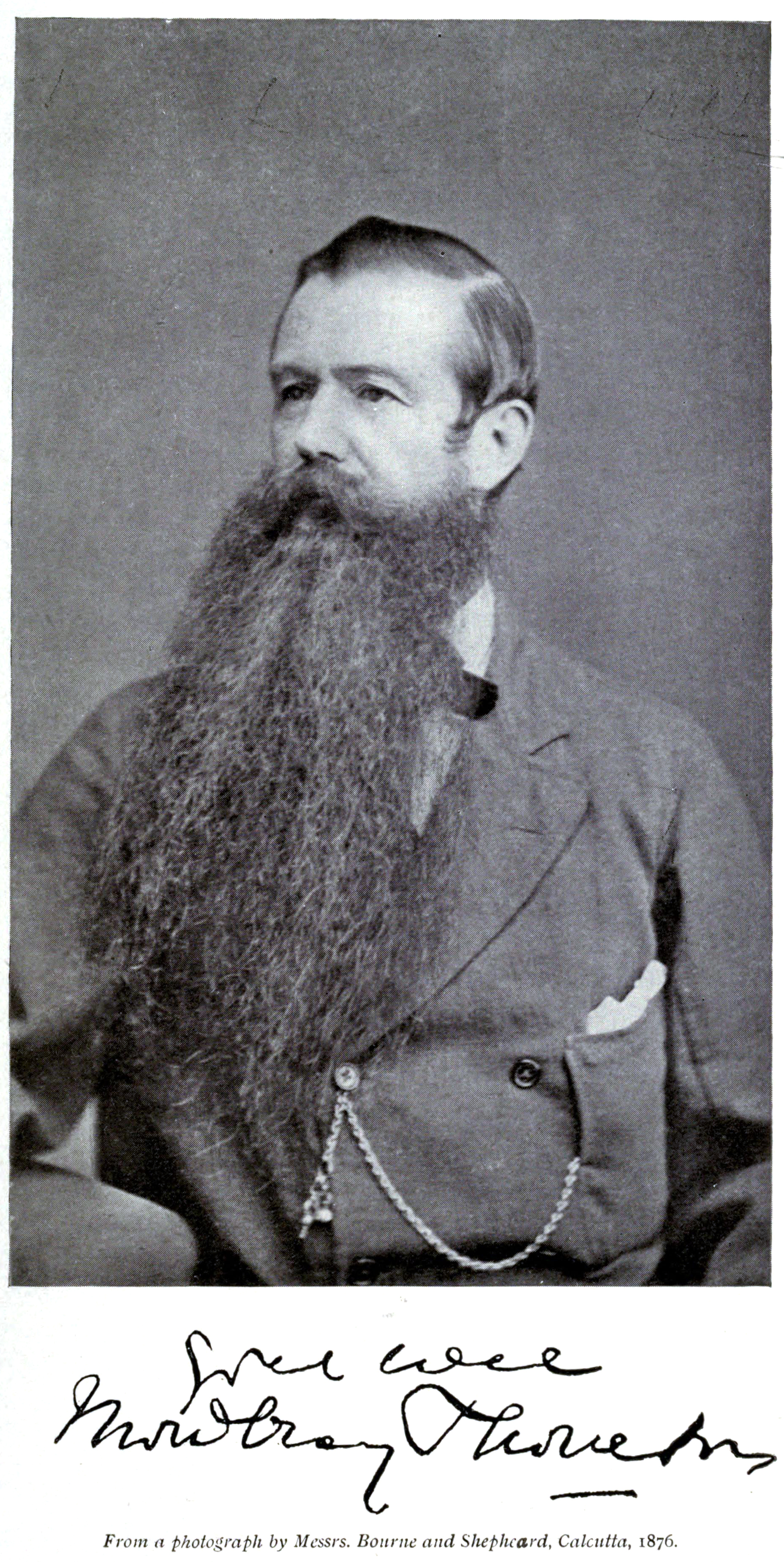
Gen. Sir Mowbray Thomson, Bourne & Shepherd, Calcutta, 1876

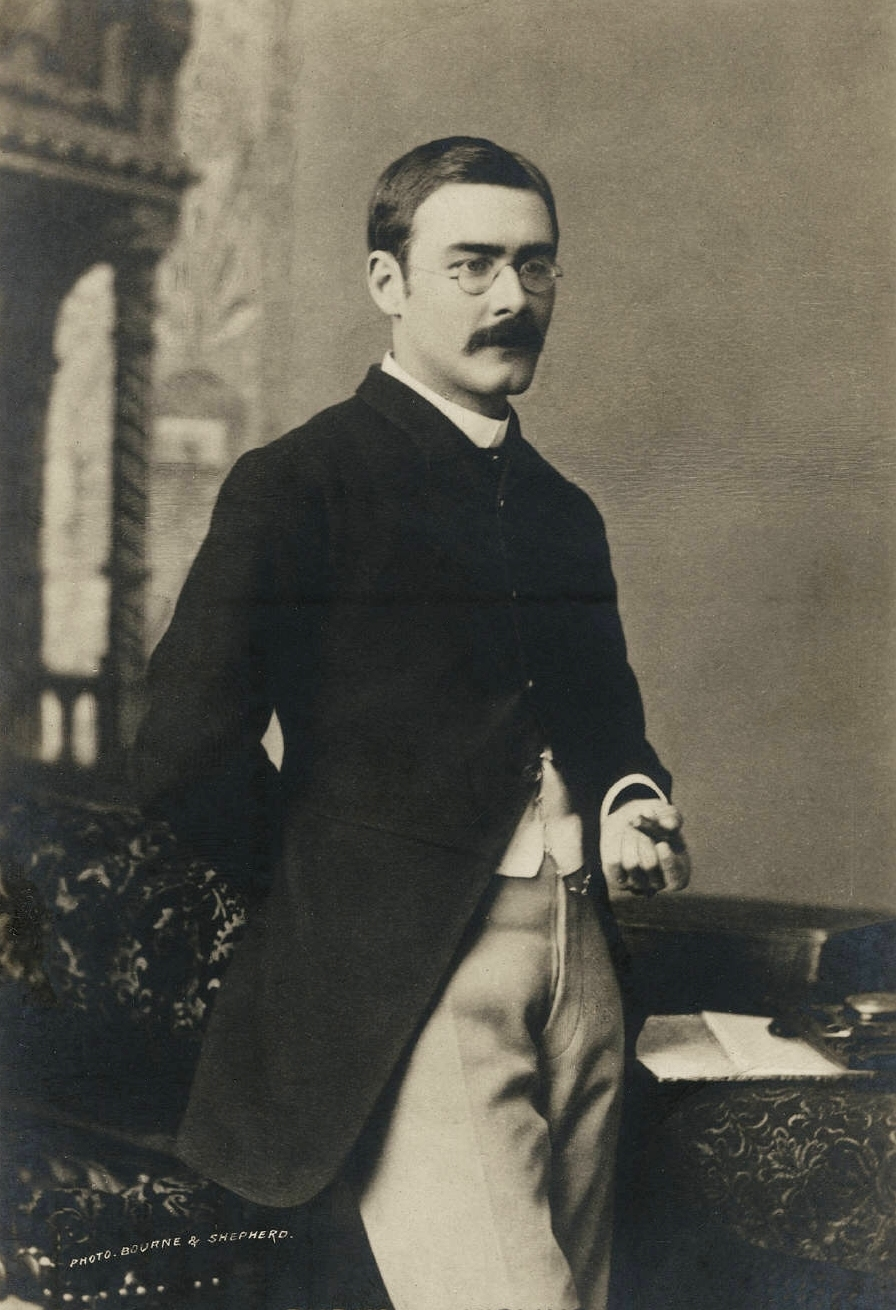
Rudyard Kipling, Bourne & Shepherd, c. 1892

== Works ==
- Album of early photographs of India, by Charles Shepherd, Samuel Bourne, James Robertson. Published by s.n.
- An Album of Photographs of Indian Architecture, Views and People, by Robertson & Shepherd S. Bourne. Published by s.n.
- Photographic Views in India, by Bourne & Shepherd. Published by [s.l.], 1866.
- Photographic Views of Jumnootri, Mussoorie, Hurdwar, Roorkee, Nynee Tal and Bheem Tal, by Bourne & Shepherd. Published by Bourne & Shepherd., 1867.
- A Permanent Record of India: Pictures of Viceroys, Moghul Emperors, Delhi Durbars, Temples, Mosques, Architectures, Types, All Indian Industries, Himalayan Scenes, Views from the Khybar Pass to the Andaman Islands : from 1840 to the Present Day, by Bourne & Shepherd. Published by Bourne & Shepherd.
- India and Burma, by Bourne & Shepherd. Published by [s.l.], 1870.
- Photographic Views in India, by Bourne and Shepherd, Simla, Calcutta, & Bombay. by Bourne and Shepherd. Published by Bourne & Shepherd.
- Photographic Views in India, by Bourne & Shepherd, Calcutta and Simla, by Bourne & Shepherd, Published by Thomas S. Smith, City Press, 1878.
- Photographic Views in India, by Bourne & Shepherd, Published by Howard Ricketts Limited.
