= Kanpur Memorial Well =

Bibighar massacre memorial

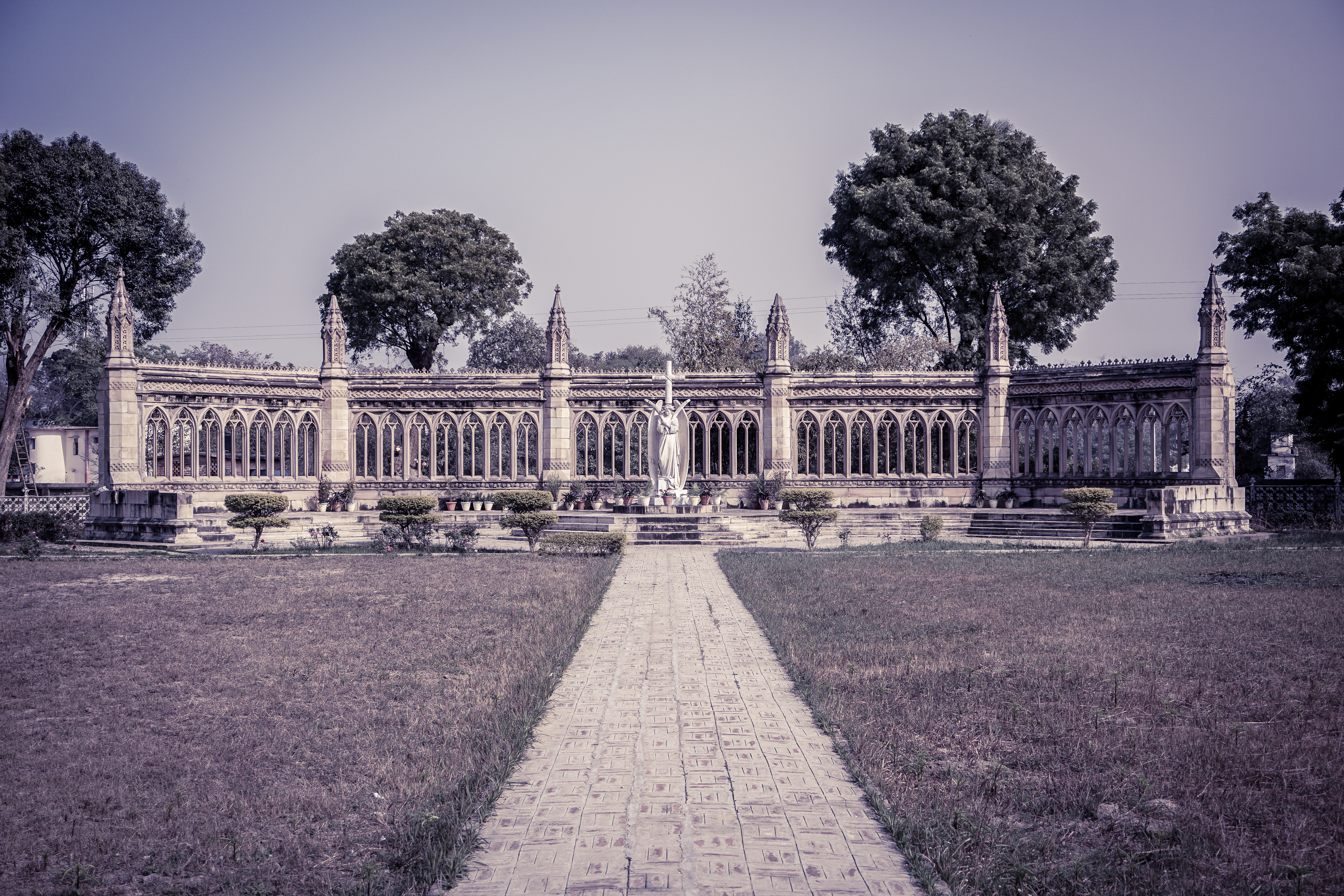
- Kanpur Memorial Well (2016)
- Interactive map of Kanpur Memorial Well
- Location: Memorial Church, Kanpur Cantonment, Uttar Pradesh, India
- Coordinates: 26.4506°N 80.3693°E
- Designer: Charlotte Canning; Carlo Marochetti; Henry Yule
- Material: Marble; Soapstone
- Completion date: 1863

The Kanpur Memorial Well, formerly known as the Cawnpore Memorial and the Bibighar Memorial, is a monument located within the grounds of the Memorial Church within the military cantonment of Kanpur, Uttar Pradesh, India. It was completed in 1863 in remembrance of the British women and children who were buried in the Kanpur well following the Siege of Cawnpore during the Indian Rebellion of 1857. (Note: In 1948 Cawnpore was renamed Kanpur)

After British forces regained control of the city, a simple monument was first built over the well connected to the killings. In 1860 a more complex monument was commissioned to produce the structure made up of an angel sculptured by Carlo Marochetti, and an eight sided stone screen with Gothic arches designed by Henry Yule. The surrounding ground was transformed into the Cawnpore Memorial Garden.

After India's independence, the memorial was moved away from the site of the well to the Memorial Church in Kanpur, where it exists in a rearranged form, and the garden was renamed Nana Rao Park. A sandstone circle remains at the garden well site, looked over by a statue of Tatya Tope.

== Background ==
In the aftermath of the Indian Rebellion of 1857, the British Empire commemorated its military losses through a range of measures, including the construction of memorials. On 15 July 1857, after the Siege of Cawnpore during the Indian Rebellion, over 125 British women and children were detained in a house known as Bibi Ghar, at the order of Nana Saheb. They were subsequently killed and thrown into the adjacent well. Upon discovery of the well by General Havelock's forces, it was decided by them to leave the bodies there and cover them with soil, before boarding it over and then fencing it off.

== Site ==
The Kanpur Memorial Well Monument is located within the grounds of the Memorial Church within the military cantonment of Kanpur, Uttar Pradesh, India.

== Architecture ==
The entire monument, consisting of an angel, cross, stone screen, stepped platform, and accompanying tombs are surrounded by an ornamental railing and are aligned with the church and designed to appear as an outdoor extension of the church building. The memorial is surrounded by a decorative fence and accessed through the original gateway, which carries a biblical inscription on one side and a reference to the British Government’s patronage on the other.

=== Planning ===
The idea and design of an angel statue came from Charlotte Canning, who visioned an "angel of the resurrection". (Note: In May 1856 an image of the Angel of Scutari, created to commemorate the dead of the Crimean War, was published in The Illustrated London News.) Following Lady Canning's death in 1860, her husband Charles Canning took on the project of arranging the memorial and commissioned it to the sculpture Carlo Marochetti, who executed Canning's wish and proposed a marble angel, though holding two palm branches rather than Canning's one. Henry Yule was recruited to design the stone screen and surround of the well. These were completed by Indian stone-cutters from Allahabad.

=== Angel ===
The marble angel stands leaning against a cross, with its wings drooping behind it and its arms crossed over its chest, holding two palm branches. It faces down to the right and is erected on a platform of steps. The cross stands above a plaque referring to "those who fell in 1857".

=== Stone screen and platform ===
The stone screen serves as a backdrop to the angel figure, which stands on a stepped pedestal. The steps extend outwards to meet the screen at both ends, forming a shallow, stage-like composition. The enclosure also contains the gravestones, crosses, and other memorials that were relocated from the two cemeteries beside the Well Monument.

== History ==
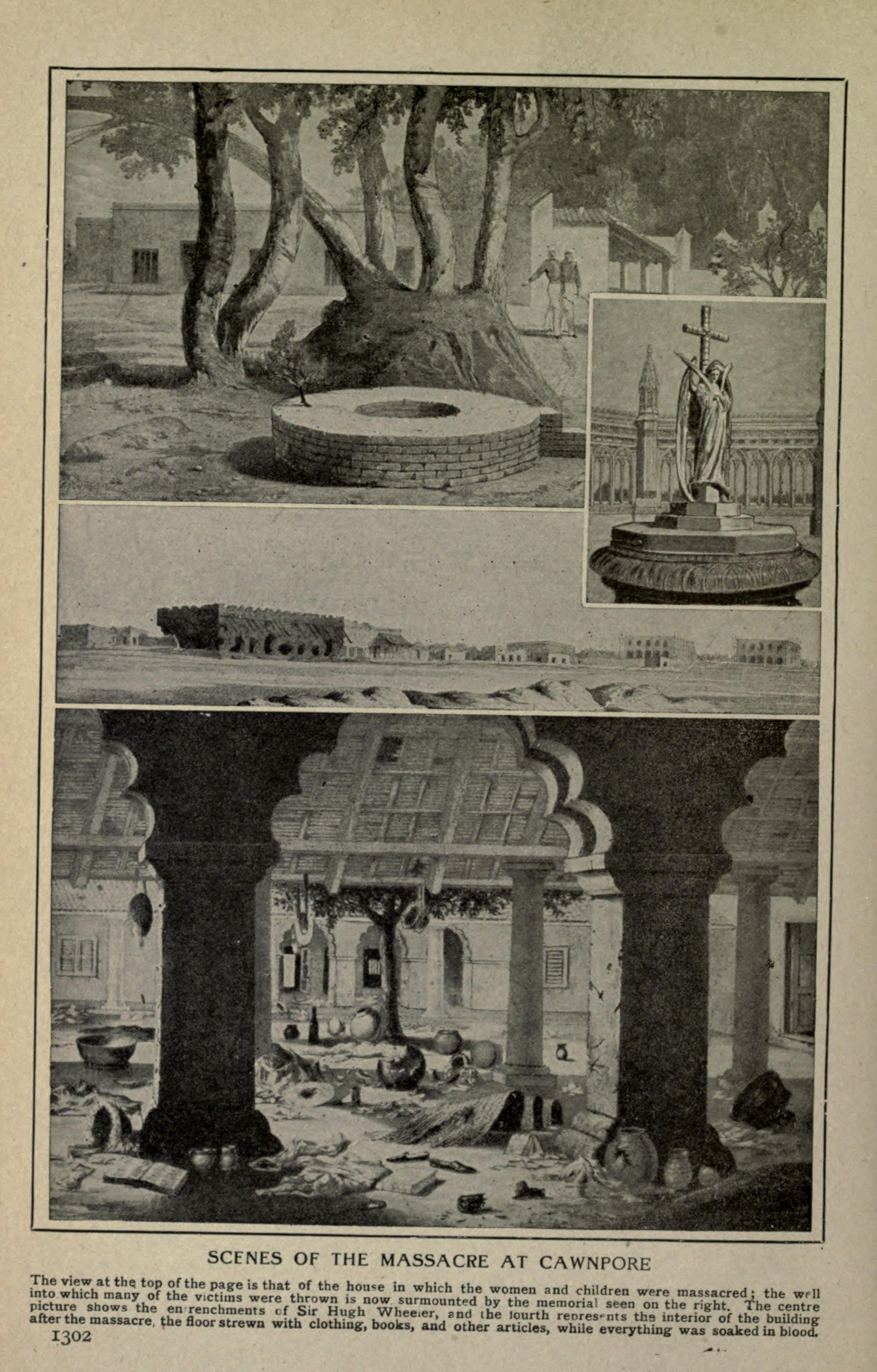
Scenes of the massacre at Kanpur (1857)

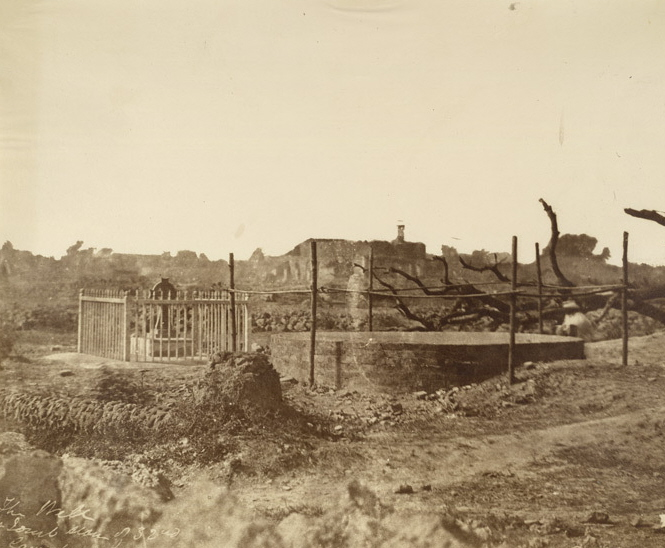
Early Memorial, by John Murray (1858)

Efforts to commemorate the British lives lost in the Bibighar massacre began shortly after the British recapture of Kanpur in 1857. Proposals for a permanent memorial were put forward in September of that year, and on 21 November soldiers of the 32nd Regiment erected a simple wooden cross near the well where the body remains had been discovered. In December 1857, John Walter Sherer, magistrate of Kanpur, suggested that a chapel be constructed on the site as a lasting tribute to the dead. Sketches prepared by Henry Yule, a friend of the Cannings, in 1857 reveal several early design concepts, including a raised enclosure around the well, a central cross, kneeling angelic figures, and a variety of canopy structures. Early discussions on the topic involved Edward Clive Bayley, whose wife Emily Bayley later recalled that her friend Lady Canning was of the opinion that "hope of the Resurrection is the only thought [that] can calm the sorrow or give any comfort" to those affected by the massacre, and therefore her design took the form of "the angel of the resurrection". Other proposed plans included "the figure of a woman leaning against a cross pierced by a sword, with bodies of dead children at her feet", and one of a statue of a "Britannia figure". In 1860, Lord Canning disclosed the final plan. By 1861 the garden was taking shape, and the assembly of Yule's stone screen and plinth had begun under the supervision of Commissioner of Allahabad, C. B. Thornhill, who lost several family members during the rebellion.

The Cannings funded the statue of the angel, whilst the revenue for the garden and Well was raised by charging Kanpur's residents.

The memorial received its consecration by the Bishop of Calcutta, George Cotton, on 11 February 1863, in the presence of Lord Elgin.

=== Description ===
The Memorial Well stood behind two tombs that were constructed for the memory of the women and children of the 1st Company, 6th Battery, Bengal Artillary and the 32nd Regiment. These tombs were enclosed within a small cemetery.

==== Garden ====
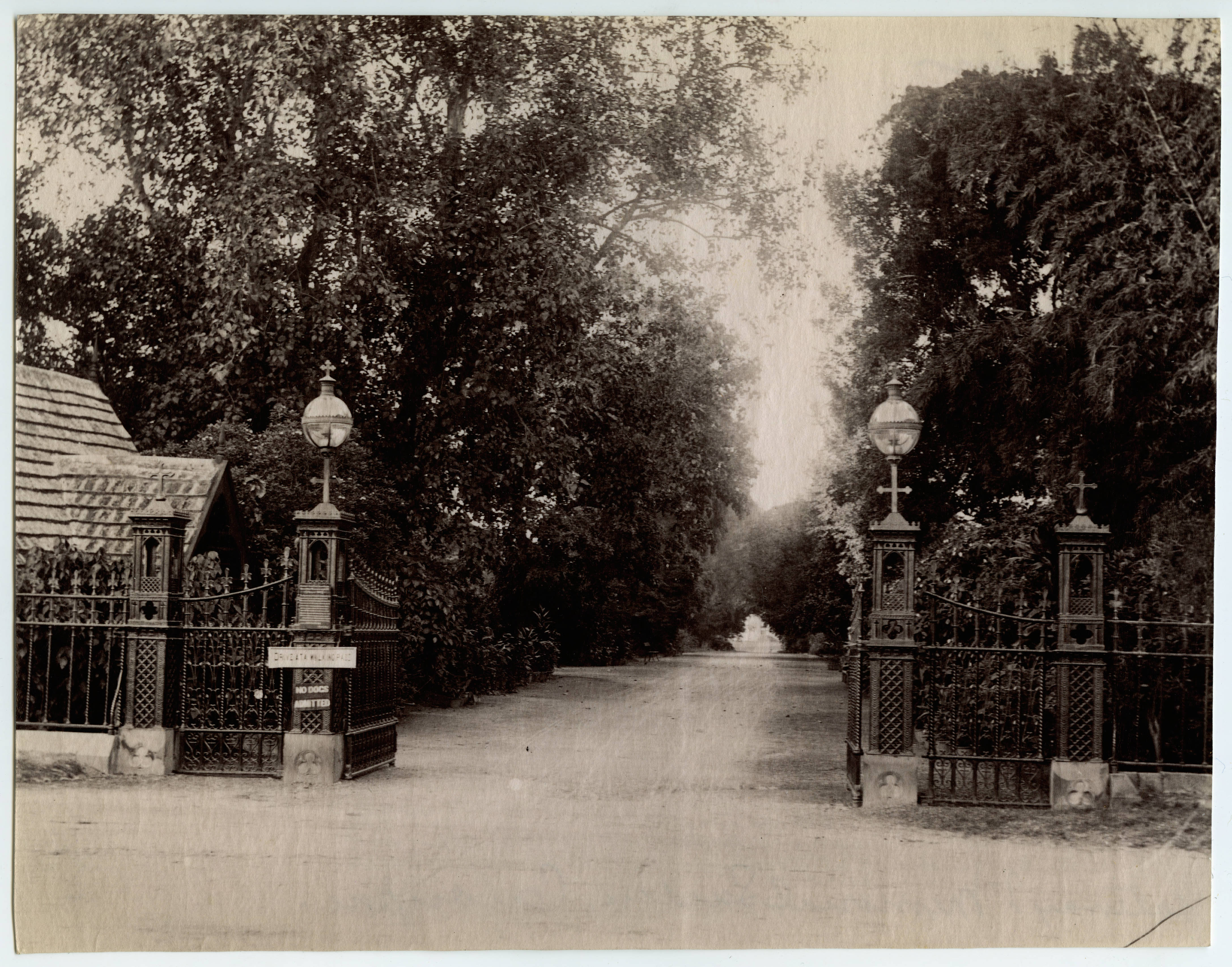
Gateway to Memorial Garden with sign "No dogs allowed"

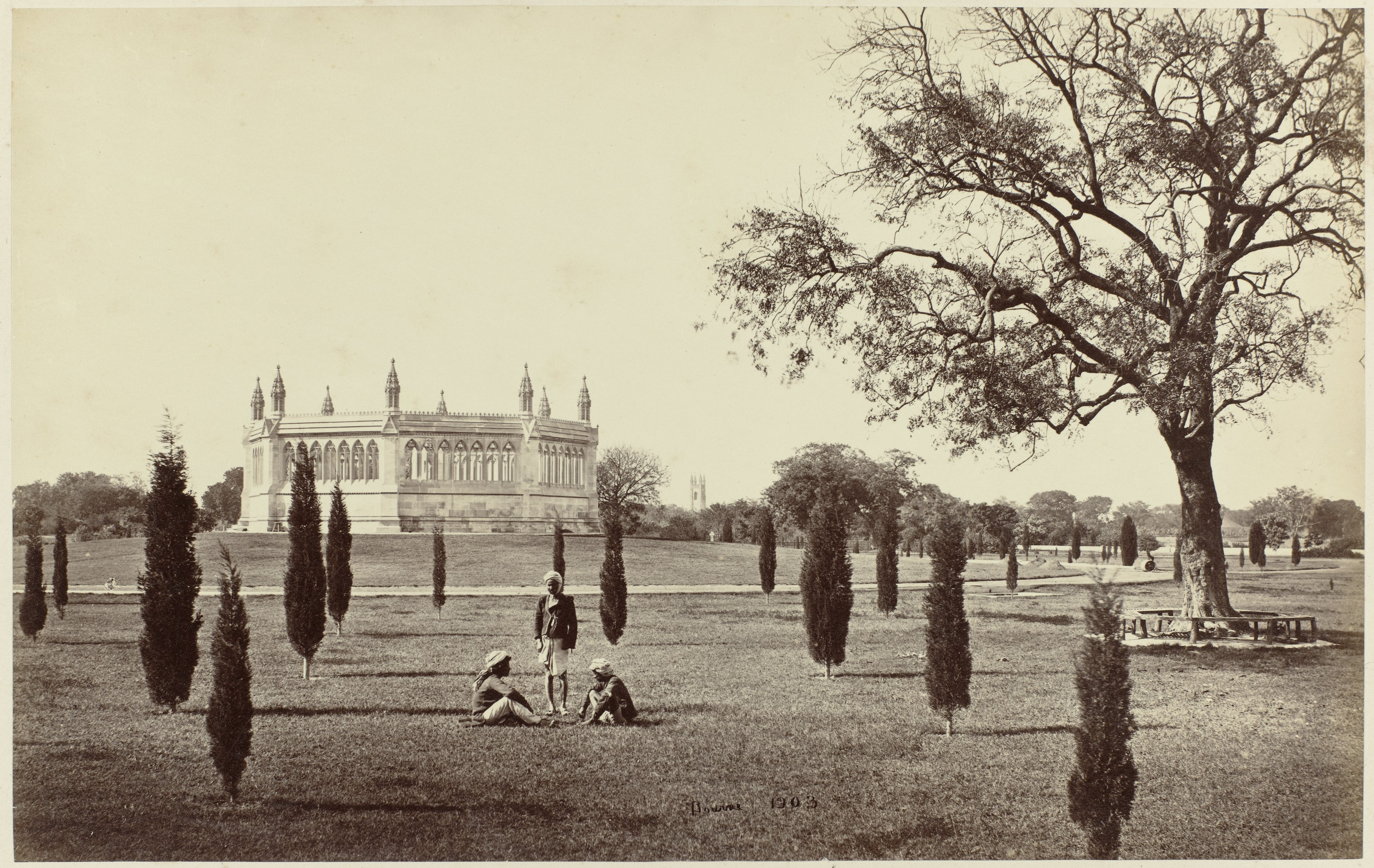
Memorial and garden (1864-1866)

When originally constructed, the Well monument, angel, and cemetery were all enclosed within a 30 acre landscaped garden, and guarded by a British soldier. A sign at the front gate quoted "no dogs allowed on the ground". Straight paths on every side led to the garden centre where the memorial stood. The complete garden was enclosed by iron railings, and the memorial was hidden from view from adjoing roads. Indians were not allowed inside the screened enclosure.

==== Memorial entrance ====
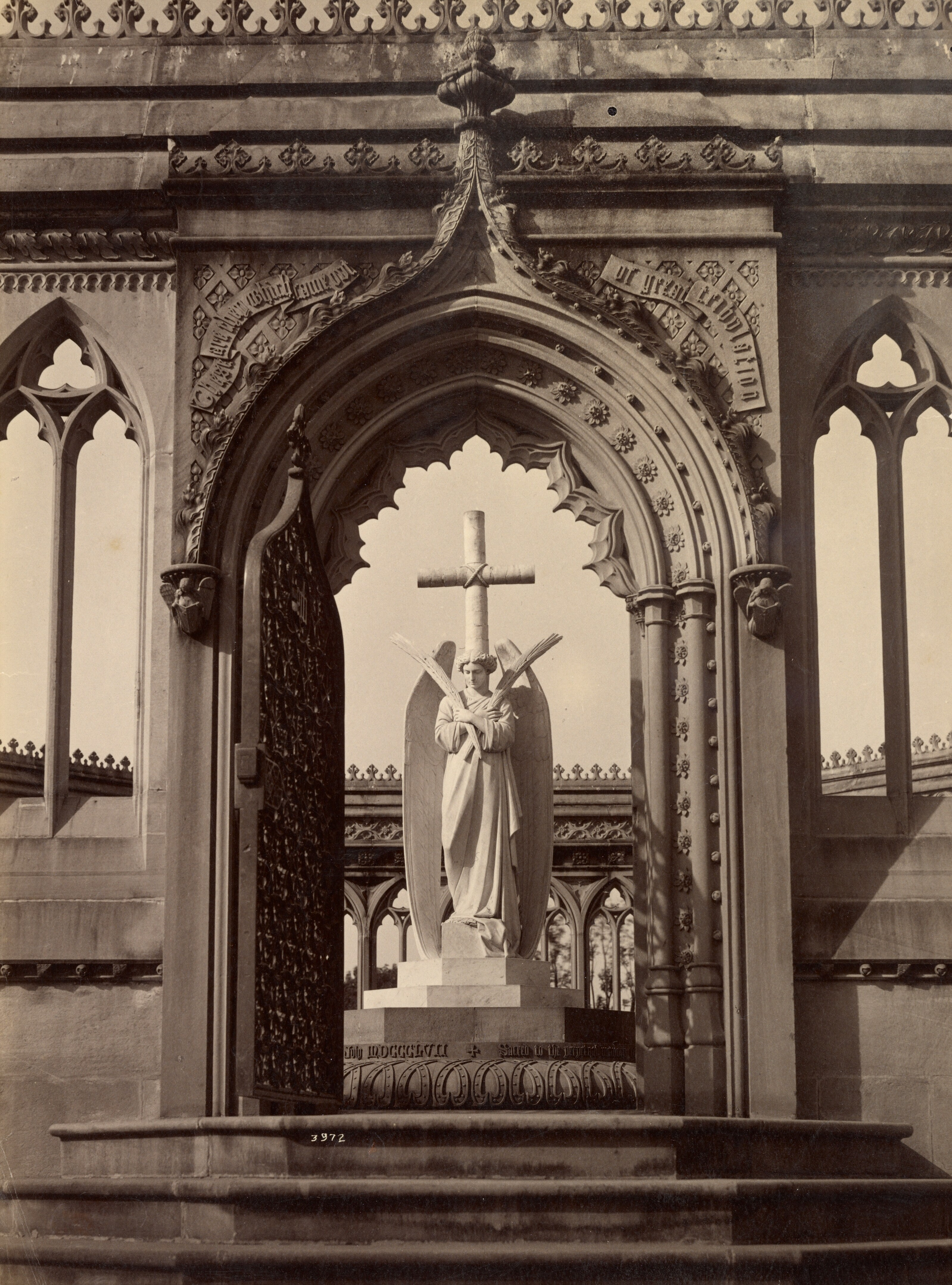
Entrance to Memorial Well

These are they which came out of great tribulation.

The Well monument was approached through a Gothic eight sided stone screen wall that enclosed the site on all sides. Its façade consisted of a central gateway with iron gates that provided access to the memorial enclosure. Above the entrance was an inscription that read "these are they which came out of great tribulation". Around the rim of the well the inscription read "Sacred to the perpetual memory of a great company of Christian people, chiefly women and children, who near this spot were cruelly massacred by the followers of the leader Nana Dhondo Punt of Bithoor, and cast the dying with the dead, into the Well below, on the 15th July MDCCCLVIII. There was an entrance gate made of gun metal.

==== Pedestal ====
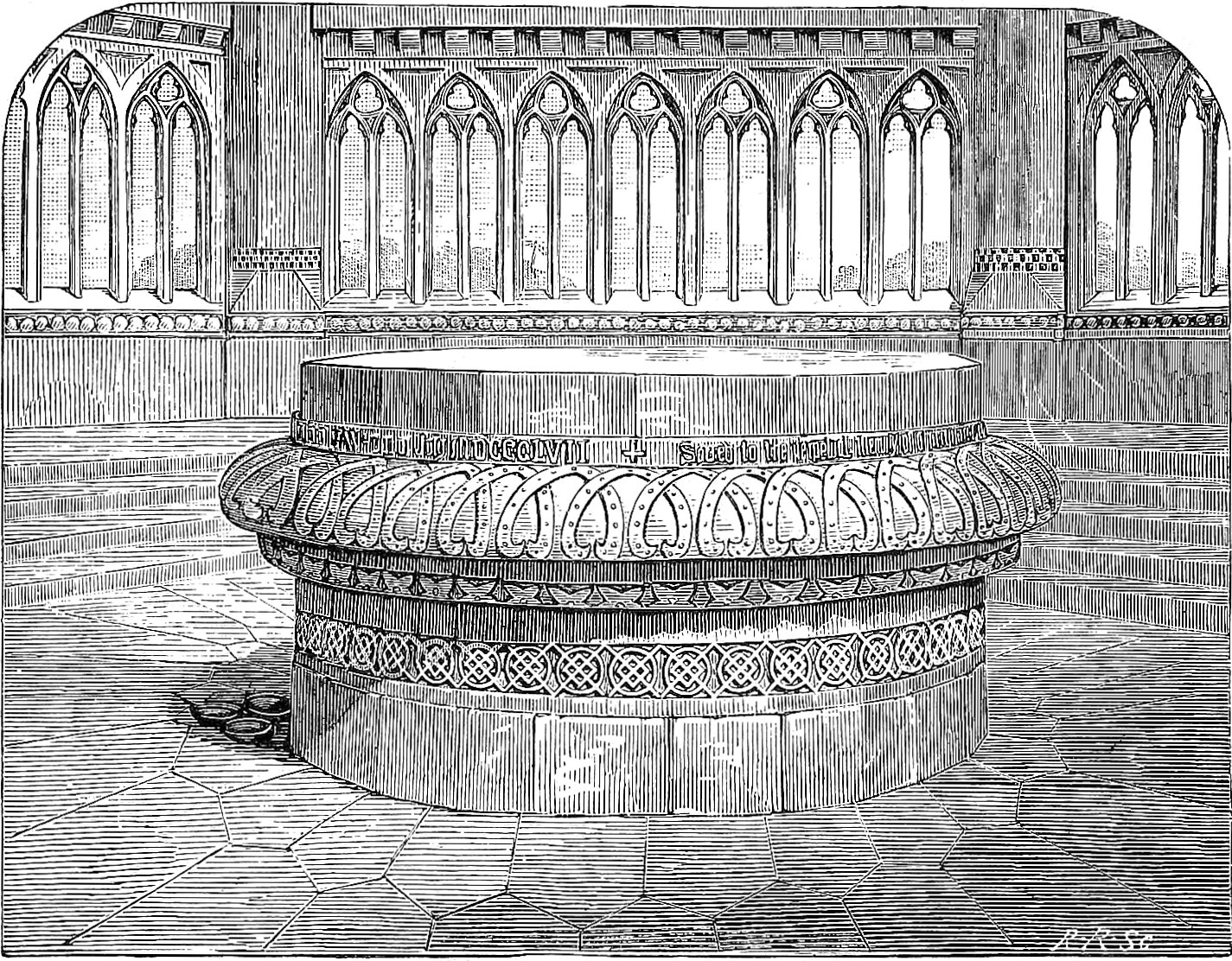
Surround of well

Sacred to the perpetual memory of a great company of Christian people, chiefly women and children, who near this spot were cruelly massacred by the followers of the leader Nana Dhondo Punt of Bithoor, and cast the dying with the dead, into the Well below, on the 15th July MDCCCLVIII

The Well monument was approached through a Gothic eight sided stone screen wall that enclosed the site on all sides. Its façade consisted of a central gateway with iron gates that provided access to the memorial enclosure. Above the entrance was an inscription that read "these are they which came out of great tribulation". Around the rim of the well the inscription read "Sacred to the perpetual memory of a great company of Christian people, chiefly women and children, who near this spot were cruelly massacred by the followers of the leader Nana Dhondo Punt of Bithoor, and cast the dying with the dead, into the Well below, on the 15th July MDCCCLVIII. There was an entrance gate made of gun metal.

== Visitors ==
During the final decades of the nineteenth century, the memorial became a popular stop on the imperial tourist circuit and was reportedly visited by more Europeans in India than the Taj Mahal. British people considered it a destination for pilgrimage.

In January 1876 the Prince of Wales visited the memorial. Several Royal family members visited in subsequent decades. John Stapylton Grey Pemberton visited the memorial in 1887.

== Post independence ==
On 15 August 1947, the monument was defaced. The angel's face was painted black, its hands broken, and graves in the surrounding gardens were vandalised. The incident raised wider concerns about the future of the memorial well and other British monuments in India. (Note: When India became independent in August 1947, Britain and the new Indian government had to decide what would happen to around 1.5 million British graves, in addition to thousands of memorials, monuments, statues, and portraits left behind.) After India's independence the Government of the United Provinces, led by Sarojini Naidu, apologised for the incident and repaired the damaged monument and gravestones. The UK High Commission, the Memorial Well Garden Society, and church authorities decided in 1948 to relocate the memorial to a secluded site and erase traces of its original location. The dismantling of the Memorial Well Monument was a prolonged and contested process involving the UK High Commission, the Commonwealth Relations Office, the Government of the United Provinces, church authorities, the Kanpur Development Board, and the Memorial Well Garden Society, which was responsible for the monument's maintenance.

The angel structure and surrounding was subsequently moved and reassembled in the Memorial Church in Kanpur, a process completed by March 1950, and the gardens were later renamed Nana Rao Park.

The sandstone circle remains at the site of the well, looked over by a statue of Tatya Tope.

== Symbolism ==
At the turn of the nineteenth century accounts by British official visitors indicated that for them the memorial had become the foremost symbol of the 1857 events at Kanpur. The inclusion of the memorial on the Prince of Wales's 1875 tour of key rebellion sites reflected the memorial's significance in British imperial commemorative culture. His visit to the Memorial Gardens and the Memorial Well highlighted the site's status as a focal point of remembrance for the events of 1857.

By early twentieth century, some reactions to the statue were linked to ideas about the future of British rule in India. The memorial has been seen to distract or redirect attention from fear and defeat. Some visitors criticised what the monument symbolised, and questioned its authoritative Gothic architecture, solemn mood and racial separation. Historian, Swati Chattopadhyay has argued that using architecture, landscaping, and restricted access, the memorial symbolised British authority, and shaped how they wished 1857 should be remembered.

Shortly after Jallianwala Bagh was purchased to create a memorial to the 1919 Amritsar massacre, objections were raised that such a monument might, "like the British Mutiny memorial at Cawnpore - simply perpetuate bitterness and ill will".

War historian, Mark Condos, argues that following India's independence, the relocation, revision of access policy, changing inscriptions, and redesign of the Kanpur Well Memorial rejected its colonial narrative and replaced it with a postcolonial one, transforming those once portrayed by the British as villains into Indian national heroes.

== Literature ==
Reference to the memorial appears in Sara Jeannette Duncan's Sonny Sahib.
