= List of engineering colleges in Kanpur =

This is a list of engineering colleges in Kanpur, India.

== About engineering in India ==
There are a number of engineering colleges in India. They are both private and government owned and spread across all parts of India.

Here is a comprehensive list and information on engineering colleges in Kanpur, India.

	College name	University
1	IIT Kanpur	IIT Kanpur
2	Harcourt Butler Technical University, Kanpur	HBTU Kanpur
3	Pranveer Singh Institute of Technology (PSIT), Kanpur	UPTU
4	Dr. Ambedkar Institute of Technology for Handicapped Kanpur	UPTU
5	Axis Institute of Technology and Management	UPTU
6	Axis Institute of Fashion Technology (AIFT)	UPTU
7	Axis Institute of Higher Education (AIHE)	CSJMU
8	Axis Institute of Diploma Engineering(AIDE)	BTEUP
9	University Institute of Engineering and Technology, Kanpur University	Kanpur University
10	Government leather Institute	UPTU
11	Maharana Pratap Engineering College	UPTU
12	Government Polytechnic Kanpur	BTEUP
13	Maharana Institute of Professional Studies	UPTU
14	Maharana Pratap College of Management and Information Technology	UPTU
15	Allenhouse Institute of Technology	UPTU
16	Bhabha Institute Of Science and Technology	UPTU
17	Bhabha College of engineering	UPTU
18	Bhabha institute of technology	UPTU
19	Krishna Institute of Technology	UPTU
20	Krishna Girls Engineering College	UPTU
21	Naraina College Of Engineering & Technology	UPTU
22	Naraian Vidya Peeth Eng. & Mgmt. Institute	UPTU
23	Banshi College Of Engineering	UPTU
24	Advance Institute of Biotech and Paramedical Sciences College Kanpur	UPTU
25	Vision Institute of Technology-Kanpur	UPTU
26	Anubhav Institute of Engineering & Management	UPTU
27	Apollo Institute of Technology	UPTU
28	Prabhat Engineering College	UPTU
29	Anubhav Institute Of Engineering And Management	UPTU
30	Govt. Central Textile Institute	UPTU
31	Vidya Bhawan College for Engineering Technology	UPTU
32	RAMA Institute of Engineering and Technology	UPTU
33	RAMA Institute of Technology	UPTU
34	Seth Sriniwas Agarwal Institute Of Engineering and Technology	UPTU
35	Virendra Swarup Institute of Computer Studies	UPTU
36	Subhash Institute of Software Technology	UPTU
37	United Institute of Designing	UPTU
