= Government Polytechnic Jaunpur =

College in Uttar Pradesh, India

- राजकीय पालीटेक्निक जौनपुर
- Motto: श्रमेव जयते्
- Type: Govt. technical college
- Established: 1984
- Principal: Raj Kumar
- Location: Jaunpur-Varanasi Highway, Jagdishpur, Jaunpur, Uttar Pradesh 222002, India
- Website: www.gpjaunpur.org.in

Government Polytechnic Jaunpur, founded in 1984, is a government institute of technical education in Jagdishpur, Jaunpur, Uttar Pradesh, India. It is affiliated with the Uttar Pradesh Board of Technical Education and approved by the All India Council for Technical Education. It falls under the East zone (Varanasi) of UPBTE.

The institute is accessible by road and rail, the closest station being Zafrabad Junction, 2 kilometres (1.2 mi) away. It has an administrative block, a laboratory block, a workshop, an electronics and computer block, and an on-campus hostel building for students.

== Degrees offered ==
- Diploma in Computer Science & Engineering
- Diploma in Pharmacy
- Diploma in Electronics Engineering

== History ==
Government Polytechnic Jaunpur was established in 1984. It began with only one branch, the Diploma in Pharmacy, and an admission capacity of 50 students. The diplomas in Electronics Engineering and Computer Science (and capacity of 75 student) were added later.
