= Kanpur =

Metropolis in Uttar Pradesh, India

Kanpur Cawnpore
- Metropolis
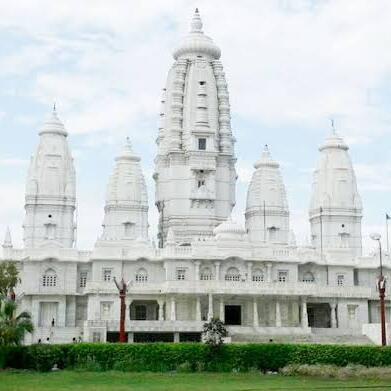
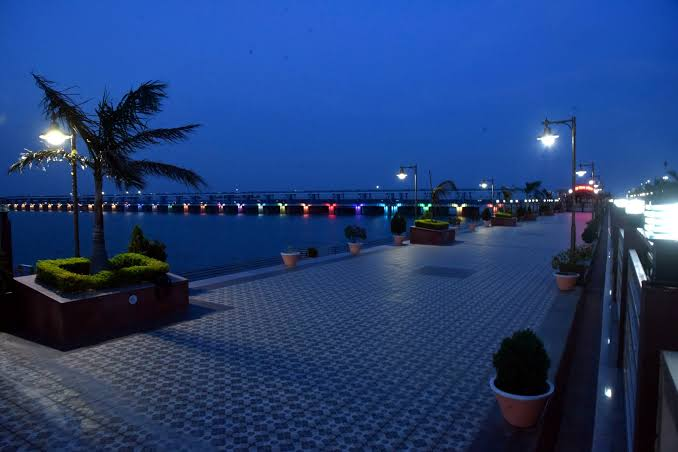
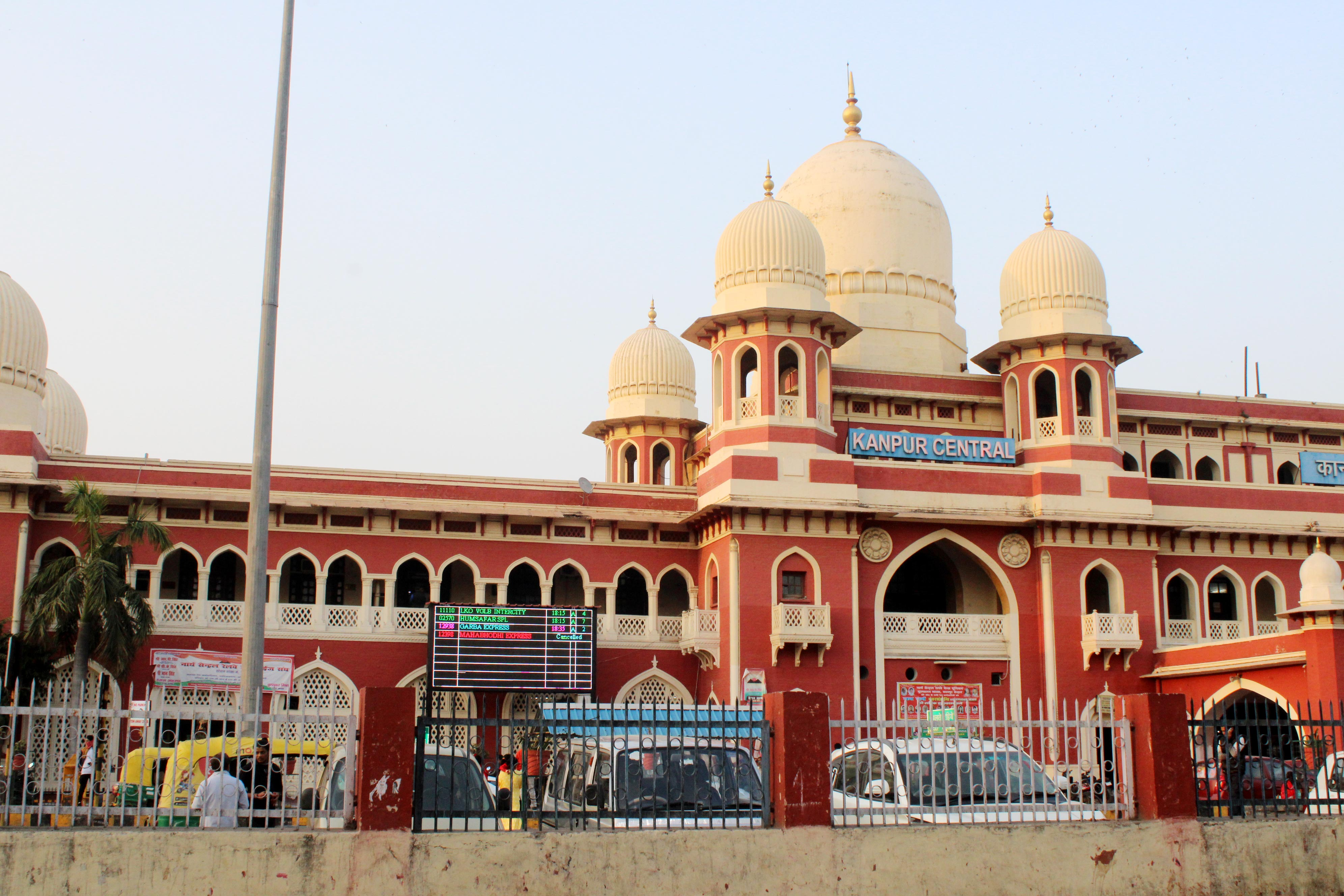
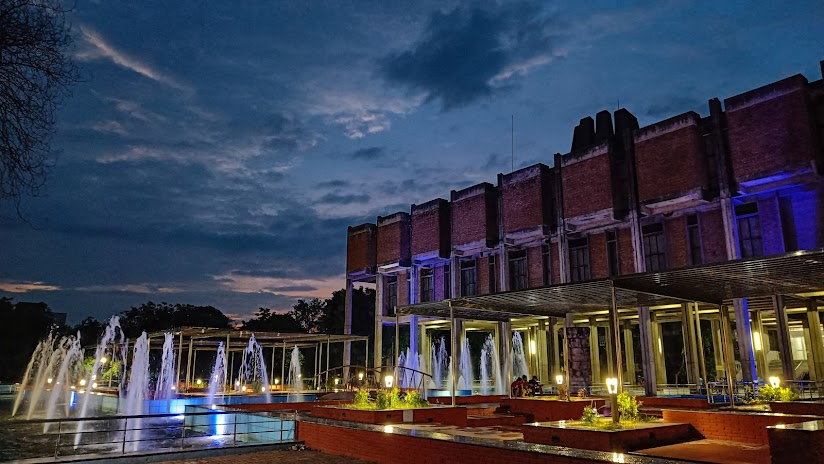
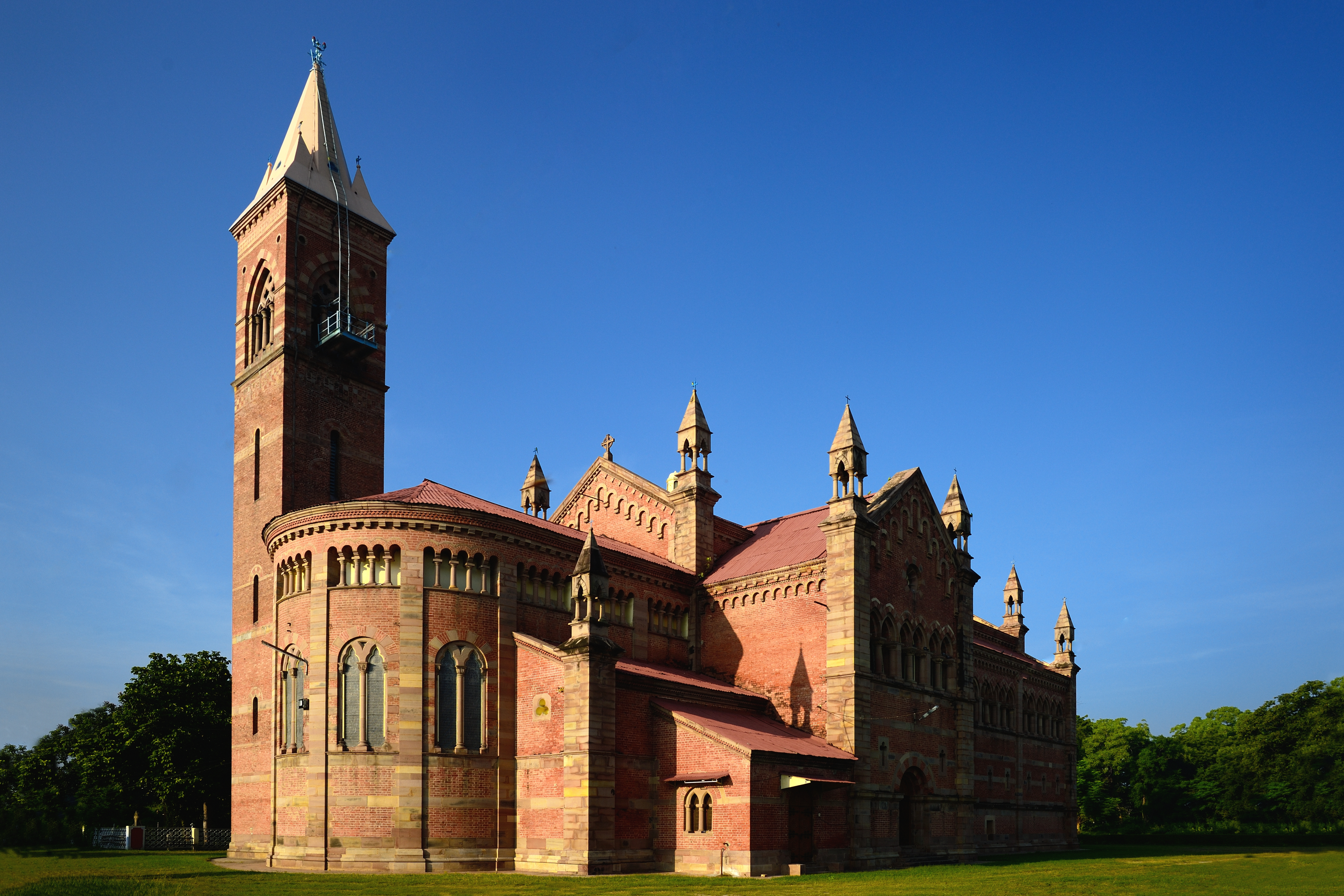
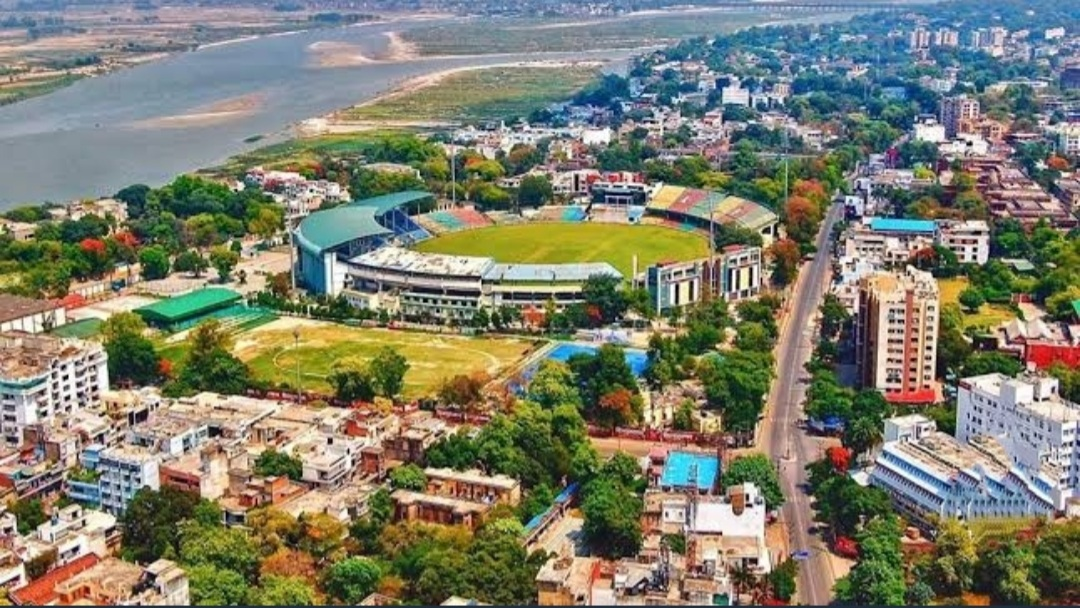
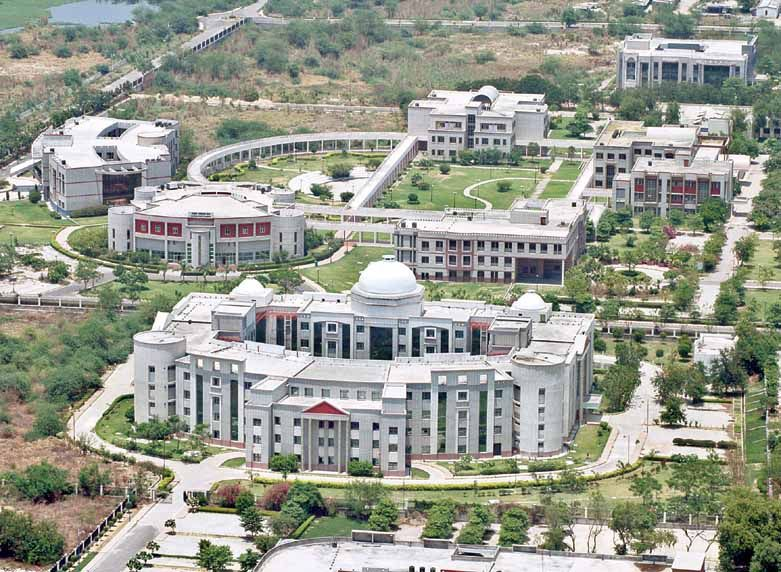
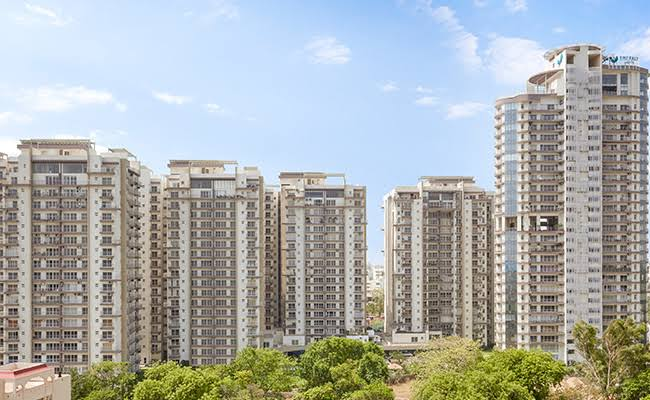
- Juggilal Kamlapat Temple Ganga Riverfront Kanpur Kanpur Central Railway Station IIT Kanpur Kanpur Memorial Church Green Park Stadium CSJM University City skyline
- Nicknames: Heart of Uttar Pradesh; Leather City of the World; Manchester of the East
- Location of Kanpur in Uttar Pradesh Location of Kanpur in India
- Coordinates: 26.449923°N 80.331874°E
- Country: India
- State: Uttar Pradesh
- Division: Kanpur Division
- District: Kanpur
- Founder: Hindu Singh Chandel
- Named for: Kanhaiya Ashtami or Karna

Government
  - Type: Municipal Corporation
  - Body: Kanpur Municipal Corporation
  - Mayor: Pramila Pandey (BJP)
  - Municipal commissioner: Shivasharanappa G N, IAS

Area
  - Kanpur Metro: 403 km^{2} (156 sq mi)
  - Kanpur City: 260 km^{2} (100 sq mi)
- Elevation: 126 m (413 ft)

Population (2024)
  - Kanpur Metro: 4,581,268 (estimate)
  - Rank: 12th
  - Density: 9,800/km^{2} (25,000/sq mi)
  - Metro: 5,230,000 (estimate)
  - Metro rank: 11th
- Demonym: Kanpuriya

Language
  - Official: Hindi
  - Additional official: English, Urdu
  - Regional: Awadhi (Kanpuriya)
- Time zone: UTC+5:30 (IST)
- Pincode(s): 2080xx /2092xx
- Telephone code: +91-512
- Vehicle registration: UP-78
- GDP Nominal: $11 billion
- Per capita: $2,800 (₹2.45 lakh)
- GDP Nominal (Kanpur Nagar District): ₹90,172 crore (2024–25)
- Sex ratio: 932 ♀/1000 ♂
- Effective literacy rate (2025): 86.46%
- International Stadium: Green Park
- Rapid Transit: Kanpur Metro
- Domestic Airport: Kanpur Airport
- HDI: ▲0.675 (medium)
- Website: Official website

Kanpur (Note: /kɑːnˈpʊər/; Hindi pronunciation: [kaːn̪.pʊɾ]), formerly anglicized as Cawnpore, is a large city in the Indian state of Uttar Pradesh. Founded by Rajput ruler Hindu Singh Chandel, Kanpur became one of the most important commercial and military stations of British Raj.

The city is home to historical monuments such as the Jajmau Ghat which dates back to the 17th century AD. Kanpur is also home to several historical sites such as the Kanpur Museum, Bhitargaon Temple, European Cemetery and Nanarao Park.

It is the 12th most populous city and the 11th most populous urban agglomeration in India (2011 census). Kanpur was an important British garrison town until 1947, when India gained independence. The urban district of Kanpur Nagar serves as the headquarters of the Kanpur division, Kanpur Range and Kanpur Zone.

It was the most populous urban city in the 2011 Indian census and the largest urban agglomeration in Uttar Pradesh, while the population of city and its suburbs were around 5 million, making it the eighth-most populous metropolitan area in India.

== History ==
The city of Kanpur is widely believed to have been founded by Raja Hindu Singh Chandel of the Sachendi state. Its original name was Kanhpur, possibly derived from Kanhiyapur or established to commemorate the Kanhaiya Ashtam festival, a day the Raja considered auspicious. An alternative theory suggests the name is a variation of Karnapur, linking it to the Mahabharata character, Karna. In its early stages, Kanpur was a collection of smaller villages, including Patkapura, Kuraswam, Juhi, and Seesamau.

The strategic importance of the area was recognized by the British following their victory over Shuja-ud-Daula, the Nawab of Awadh, near Jajmau in May 1765. Although Kanpur remained part of the Oudh Kingdom until 1801, a British military camp was established there as early as 1778.

The official transfer to British control occurred through the Treaty of 1801 with Nawab Saadat Ali Khan. This marked a turning point in Kanpur's history, as the British began to develop it into a major hub. Leveraging its strategic location on the banks of the Ganges, the East India Company initiated an indigo trade. The city's growth was further accelerated by major infrastructure projects, including the construction of the Grand Trunk Road in 1832 and the addition of roads connecting it to Lucknow and Kalpi in 1864.

=== 1857 Uprising ===
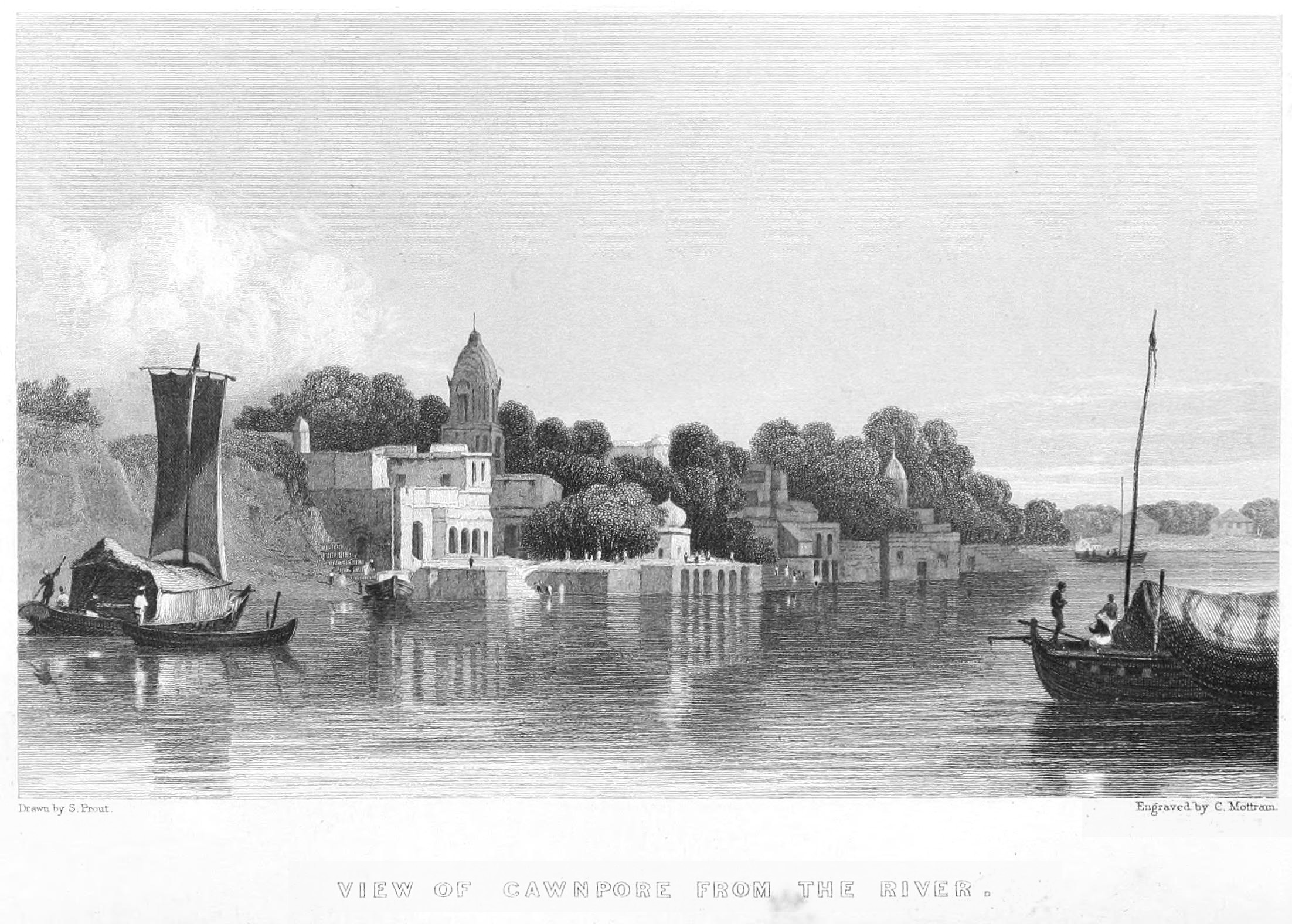
Kanpur from the river in 1858

In the 19th century, Cawnpore was an important British garrison with barracks for 7,000 soldiers. During the Indian Rebellion of 1857, 900 British men, women and children were besieged in the fortifications for 22 days by rebels under Nana Sahib. They surrendered on the agreement that they would get safe passage to the nearby Sati Chaura Ghat whereupon they would board barges and be allowed to go by river to Allahabad.

Though controversy surrounds what exactly happened at the Sati Chaura Ghat and who fired the first shot, it is known that soon afterwards the departing British were shot at by the sepoys and were either killed or captured. Some of the British officers later claimed that the sepoys had, on purpose, placed the boats as high in the mud as possible, to cause delay. They also claimed that Sahib's camp had previously arranged for the sepoys to fire upon and to kill all of the English. Although the East India Company later accused Sahib of betrayal and murder of innocent people, no evidence has ever been found to prove that he planned or ordered the massacre. Some historians believe that the Sati Chaura Ghat massacre was the result of confusion and not of any plan implemented by Sahib or his associates. Lieutenant Mowbray Thomson, one of the four male survivors of the massacre, believed that the rank-and-file sepoys who spoke to him did not know of the killing to come.

Many were killed and the remaining 200 British women and children were brought back to shore and sent to a building called the Bibighar ('House of the Ladies'). After some time, the commanders of the rebels decided to kill their hostages. The rebel soldiers refused to carry out orders and butchers from the nearby town were brought in to kill the hostages three days before the British entered the city on 18 July. The dismembered bodies were thrown into a deep well nearby. The British, under General Neill, retook the city and committed a series of retaliations against the rebel sepoys and those civilians caught in the area, including women, children and old men. The Cawnpore Massacre, as well as similar events elsewhere, were seen by the British as justification for unrestrained vengeance. "Remember Cawnpore" became a British war cry for the rest of the war.

== Geography ==
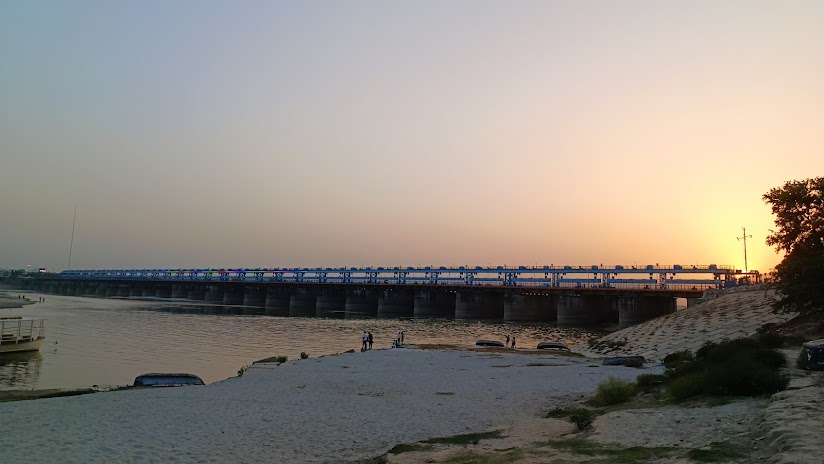
Kanpur is situated on the right bank of the Ganga

Kanpur is located at 26.449923°N 80.331874°E in the central-western part of the state of Uttar Pradesh. The city lies 484 kilometres (301 mi) southeast of the national capital, New Delhi, and 80 kilometres (50 mi) southwest of the state capital, Lucknow. It is a part of the historical region of Awadh.

Situated in the flat Indo-Gangetic Plains, Kanpur has an average elevation of 318 metres (1,043 ft) above sea level. The Ganga flows by the city and several ghats are located on its banks, notably the Sati Chaura Ghat and Sarsaiya Ghat. The Brahmavart Ghat located at Bithoor (25 km northwards) is another ghat of religious importance.

Several parks and recreational areas are located in Kanpur. Nana Rao Park and Phool Bagh are among the prominent parks in city that have existed from the time of the British Raj. The Moti Jheel, a rectangular lake, was originally developed as a drinking water reservoir. The lake has now been developed as a recreational area with a landscaped garden and a children's park. Nawabganj Bird Sanctuary is also located near Kanpur.

=== Climate ===
Kanpur

Climate chart (precipitation, max. and min. temperature)
J	F	M	A	M	J	J	A	S	O	N	D
15 23 9	16 26 11	7.9 32 16	5.3 38 22	8.4 41 27	66 40 29	245 34 27	273 33 26	162 33 25	40 33 20	4.6 29 13	7.1 24 9
- █ Average max. and min. temperatures in °C
- █ Precipitation totals in mm
- Source: WMO
Imperial conversion
J	F	M	A	M	J	J	A	S	O	N	D
0.6 73 47	0.6 79 52	0.3 90 61	0.2 101 71	0.3 106 80	2.6 104 83	9.6 94 80	11 91 79	6.4 92 77	1.6 91 67	0.2 84 55	0.3 76 48
- █ Average max. and min. temperatures in °F
- █ Precipitation totals in inches

Like most of lowland northern India, Kanpur has a monsoon-influenced humid subtropical climate (Cwa) bordering on a hot semi-arid climate (BSh) under the Köppen climate classification. Kanpur sees an annual precipitation of 865–900 mm (34.1–35.4 in). The southwest monsoon enters around 20–23 June, and total precipitation from the monsoon is 750–800 mm (30–31 in). Southwest monsoon withdrawal takes place generally between the last week of September and the first week of October. The month of October saw heavy monsoon rains in the years 1971 (133 mm), 1985 (367 mm), 1999 (137 mm), 2013 (143 mm), and 2022 (225 mm), and 2024.

Annual precipitation reached at least 1,000 mm (39 in) in 2008, 2010, 2013, 2018–2022 and 2024.

Climate data for Kanpur Airport (1991–2020, extremes 1901–present)
Month	Jan	Feb	Mar	Apr	May	Jun	Jul	Aug	Sep	Oct	Nov	Dec	Year
Record high °C (°F)	31.1 (88.0)	35.6 (96.1)	42.8 (109.0)	45.6 (114.1)	47.2 (117.0)	47.3 (117.1)	45.0 (113.0)	40.6 (105.1)	40.0 (104.0)	40.6 (105.1)	36.1 (97.0)	31.3 (88.3)	47.3 (117.1)
Mean daily maximum °C (°F)	22.3 (72.1)	25.8 (78.4)	30.7 (87.3)	37.0 (98.6)	40.3 (104.5)	39.2 (102.6)	34.7 (94.5)	32.9 (91.2)	32.8 (91.0)	32.9 (91.2)	28.3 (82.9)	24.1 (75.4)	31.5 (88.7)
Daily mean °C (°F)	15.2 (59.4)	18.3 (64.9)	22.8 (73.0)	28.5 (83.3)	32.8 (91.0)	33.3 (91.9)	30.8 (87.4)	29.4 (84.9)	28.5 (83.3)	25.4 (77.7)	20.6 (69.1)	16.6 (61.9)	25.15 (77.27)
Mean daily minimum °C (°F)	8.0 (46.4)	10.8 (51.4)	14.8 (58.6)	20.0 (68.0)	25.4 (77.7)	27.4 (81.3)	27.0 (80.6)	26.0 (78.8)	24.2 (75.6)	18.0 (64.4)	13.0 (55.4)	9.0 (48.2)	18.3 (64.9)
Record low °C (°F)	1.6 (34.9)	0.6 (33.1)	7.2 (45.0)	11.1 (52.0)	16.4 (61.5)	20.6 (69.1)	21.7 (71.1)	21.7 (71.1)	11.8 (53.2)	4.6 (40.3)	0.5 (32.9)	−0.9 (30.4)	−0.9 (30.4)
Average rainfall mm (inches)	22.7 (0.89)	14.0 (0.55)	8.9 (0.35)	5.9 (0.23)	10.3 (0.41)	84.0 (3.31)	260.0 (10.24)	235.0 (9.25)	166.0 (6.54)	33.4 (1.31)	6.0 (0.24)	4.7 (0.19)	864.5 (34.04)
Average rainy days	1.9	1.1	1.5	0.7	1.4	4.7	11.2	10.8	5.9	1.3	0.5	0.3	41.4
Average relative humidity (%) (at 17:30 IST)	56	53	43	30	31	45	66	76	70	55	61	60	54
Source: India Meteorological Department

Kanpur has been ranked the fifth best National Clean Air City in India under Category 1 (cities with populations greater than 1,000,000) by the Central Pollution Control Board.

== Demographics ==
Historical population
Year	Pop.	±%
1901	202,797	—
1911	178,557	−12.0%
1921	216,436	+21.2%
1931	219,189	+1.3%
1941	452,495	+106.4%
1951	646,811	+42.9%
1961	892,468	+38.0%
1971	1,160,026	+30.0%
1981	1,489,301	+28.4%
1991	1,874,409	+25.9%
2001	2,551,337	+36.1%
2011	2,765,348	+8.4%
2021	3,104,000	+12.2%

Religion in Kanpur (2011)
Religion	Percent
Hinduism	78.03%
Islam	19.85%
Sikhism	1.01%
Christianity	0.46%
Other or not stated	0.47%

As per the provisional results of the 2011 census, Kanpur Nagar district has a population of 4,581,000. The literacy rate was 79.65 per cent and the sex ratio was 862. There are 35 Parsis in Kanpur with their fire temple at The Mall. Hinduism is the majority religion in Kanpur with a sizeable minority of Muslims. Sikhs, Christians and Buddhists are below 2% combined.

Although final 2023 census data is yet to be declared, the population of Kanpur Nagar district is projected to be 6,367,963 in 2023 (per aadhaar data).

As per the 2011 census, the population of Kanpur city and its suburbs was 3,015,645, making it the largest urban agglomeration of Uttar Pradesh. Thereafter, the urban area of Kanpur city has expanded to a large extent. However, the official limits of the area are still pending approval by the Government. Tentatively, the population of Kanpur city and Kanpur metropolitan area in 2024 are projected as 3,926,000 and 5,100,000 respectively as per available data.

Awadhi (Kanpuriya), Hindi, and Urdu are the predominant languages in the city. Punjabi is spoken by 1.25%, while Bengali is spoken by over 11,000 people in the city.

== Government and politics ==
Local officials
Divisional Commissioner	Amit Gupta
District Magistrate	Vishakh G. Iyer
Police Commissioner	Ram Krishna Swarnkar
Inspector General, Kanpur Range	Prashant Kumar
Vice Chairman, Kanpur Development Authority	Vishakh G. Iyer (addl. charge)
Mayor	Pramila Pandey
Municipal Commissioner	Shivasharanappa G. N.
District Judge	Pradeep Kumar Singh
Chief Metropolitan Magistrate	Sushil Kumar Singh

=== Urban infrastructure ===
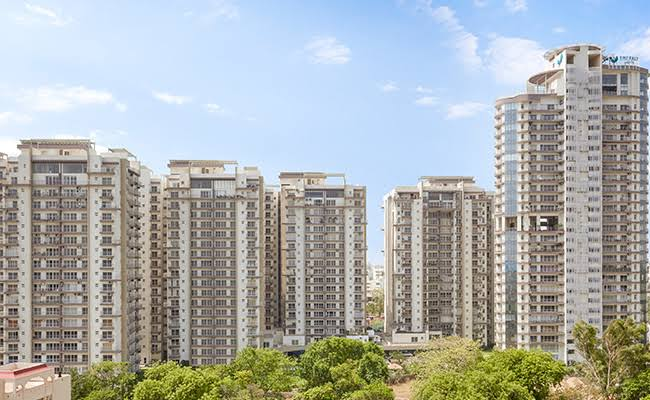
High-rise buildings of Kanpur

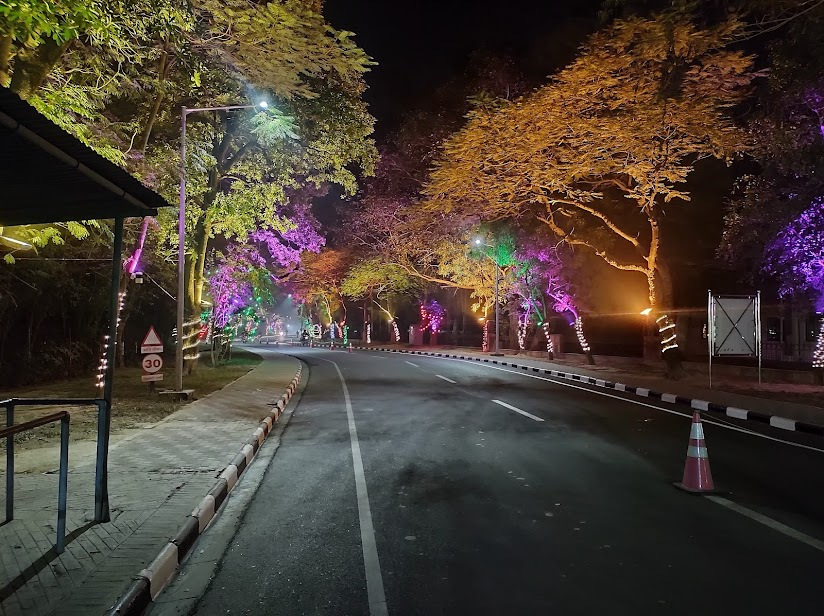
IIT Kanpur campus

Kanpur Metro Station

The metropolitan region includes Kanpur Nagar Nigam (KNN), 8 kilometres around the KNN boundary, and 47 villages of Unnao district. On the northeastern side it extends to Murtaza Nagar, in the west its limit is Akbarpur, Kanpur Dehat, and the eastern limit has been expanded to the road leading to Fatehpur. The metropolitan region includes the areas of Shuklaganj Municipal Committee (Nagar Palika), Unnao Municipal Committee (Nagar Palika), Akbarpur Village Authority (Nagar Panchayat) and Bithoor Village Authority (Nagar Panchayat).

=== Administration ===
==== General administration ====
Kanpur division consists of six districts and is headed by the divisional commissioner of Kanpur, an Indian Administrative Service (IAS) officer. The commissioner is the head of local government institutions (including municipal corporations) in charge of infrastructure development and maintaining law and order in the division. The district magistrate of Kanpur reports to the divisional commissioner. The current commissioner is Shri Amit Gupta.

Kanpur district administration is headed by the district magistrate (DM) of Kanpur, an IAS officer. The DM is in charge of property records and revenue collection for the central government, oversees city elections, and is also responsible for maintaining law and order. The DM is assisted by a chief development officer; four district magistrates for finance/revenue, city, land acquisition, and civil supply; and eight city magistrates. The district has four tehsils viz. Sadar, Bilhaur, Ghatampur and Narwal, each headed by a sub-divisional magistrate. The current DM is Mr. Rakesh Kumar Singh.

==== Civic administration ====
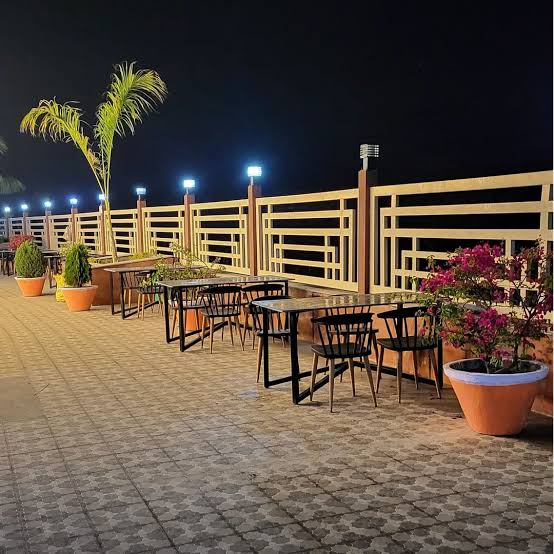

Kanpur municipality was established on 22 November 1861, and was upgraded to a municipal corporation in 1959.

The area under the municipal limits of Kanpur city, or Kanpur Municipal Corporation, is spread over an area of 403 square km. It oversees civic activities in the city. The head of the corporation is the mayor, but the executive and administration of the corporation are the responsibility of the municipal commissioner, who is an IAS officer. The executive wing is headed by municipal commissioner, Sudhir Kumar, and has the following departments: Revenue, City Cleansing, Engineering, Marg Prakash, Health, Accounts, Personnel/HRD, Swasthya Vibhag, Education, Mukya Nagar Lekha Vibhag, Pariyojna, Udyan Vibhag, Chikitsa Vibhag, Encroachment & Cattle Catching Department. There is also an executive committee present in the city.

The development of infrastructure in the city is overseen by Kanpur Development Authority (KDA), which comes under the Housing Department of Uttar Pradesh government. The divisional commissioner of Kanpur acts as the ex-officio Chairman of KDA, whereas a vice chairperson, a government-appointed IAS officer, looks after the daily matters of the authority. The current vice-chairman of Kanpur Development Authority is Shri Madan Singh Garbyal.

The municipality receives revenue from general tax, advertisement tax, income from municipal properties, and grants from state government.

==== Municipal finance ====
According to financial data published on the CityFinance Portal of the Ministry of Housing and Urban Affairs, the Kanpur Municipal Corporation reported total revenue receipts of ₹931 crore (US$112 million) and total expenditure of ₹805 crore (US$97 million) in 2022–23. Tax revenue accounted for about 21.4% of the total revenue, while the corporation received ₹670 crore in grants during the financial year.

==== Law and order ====
The Kanpur District Court is headed by the district judge of Kanpur, who is assisted by numerous additional district judges, civil judges (senior division) and additional civil judges. Kanpur is a notified metropolitan area by UP Government under Code of Criminal Procedure, 1973, and therefore has a chief metropolitan magistrate, who is assisted by several metropolitan magistrates. The district judge is Shri Pradeep Kumar Singh, and the chief metropolitan magistrate was Shri Sushil Kumar Singh.

==== Police administration ====
Kanpur Nagar police administration is headed by a Commissioner of Police which is an IPS officer of the rank of Additional Director General of Uttar Pradesh Police. The present Police Commissioner of Kanpur Nagar is Shri Akhil Kumar, who is assisted by an additional Commissioner, a Joint Commissioner and several Deputy Commissioners, additional Deputy Commissioners, and Assistant Commissioners of Police who are either IPS officers or Provincial Police Service (PPS) officers. Each of the several police circles is headed by an Assistant Commissioner of Police in the rank of deputy superintendent of police.

=== Politics ===
==== Local politics ====
The city is divided into six zones and 110 wards with a ward population range of 19,000 to 26,000 and 110 corporators directly elected from each ward. As mandated by the 74th constitutional amendment, there were 11 ward committees in Kanpur municipal corporation in 1991. Local elections were last held in 2022, when the mayor, Pramila Pandey from the BJP, was re-elected. The previous mayor had been Captain (retired) Jagatvir Singh Drona. As of 2006, Kanpur Municipal Council has an elected mayor-in-council system.

==== State politics ====
Kanpur Nagar district encompasses one Lok Sabha constituency and ten Uttar Pradesh Vidhan Sabha constituencies. The city of Kanpur has one representative member of parliament in Lok Sabha for Kanpur, Satyadev Pachauri.

=== Civic utilities ===
The first development plan of the city was created by the Kanpur Development Board in 1943. This was followed by the masterplan being designed by the Town and Country Planning Department from 1962 to 1991, which was adopted after the establishment of the Kanpur Development Authority in 1974. The most recent masterplan is the Draft Master Plan of 2021 .

Electricity is supplied to the city by Kanpur Electricity Supply Company (KESCO), which is under the Uttar Pradesh Power Corporation Ltd (UPPCL). Fire services are under the state, Uttar Pradesh Fire Service.

Water supply, sewerage is done by the Jal Kal vibhag of KMC. Infrastructure development and maintenance is done by the state's body, UP Jal Nigam. The piped water supply of Kanpur City was started in 1892. After construction of Ganga Barrage on the river, a permanent and reliable source for the water supply got available to provide 1600 mld raw water. The city also receives water from the catchment areas of rivers Ganga and Pandu. However, while the total water supply requirement is 600 mld only 385 mld of potable water is being supplied. The city loses water due to leaky pipes and contamination of natural water sources. There is a severe water crisis in Kanpur.

In 2015, Ganga Pollution Control Unit in Kanpur got about Rs 200 crores to make four STPs functional. The city then reported having three STPs for domestic waste. In 2017, there was only one sewage treatment plant for waste from tanneries, biggest source of industrial pollution to the Ganga, was to be replaced by a newer one costing 400 cr as the old one could only treat 9 MLD at the most. 823.1 MLD of untreated sewage and 212.42 MLD of industrial effluent flow into the river. In 2019, another STP costing worth Rs 816.25 was to be set up. As of 2020, While the government has stopped pollution from Kanpur's biggest drain, Sishamau, of Kanpur's 48 drains, eight still have no devices to stop effluents.

Solid waste management is handled by the KMC. As of 2015, Kanpur generates 1,500 tonnes of solid wastes from domestic and industrial sources, 64,000 tonnes of hazardous waste annually which includes metals and waste generated by tanneries, dye industries and chemical industries; while coal ash produced in Kanpur amounts to 71,000 tonnes per annum.

== Transport ==
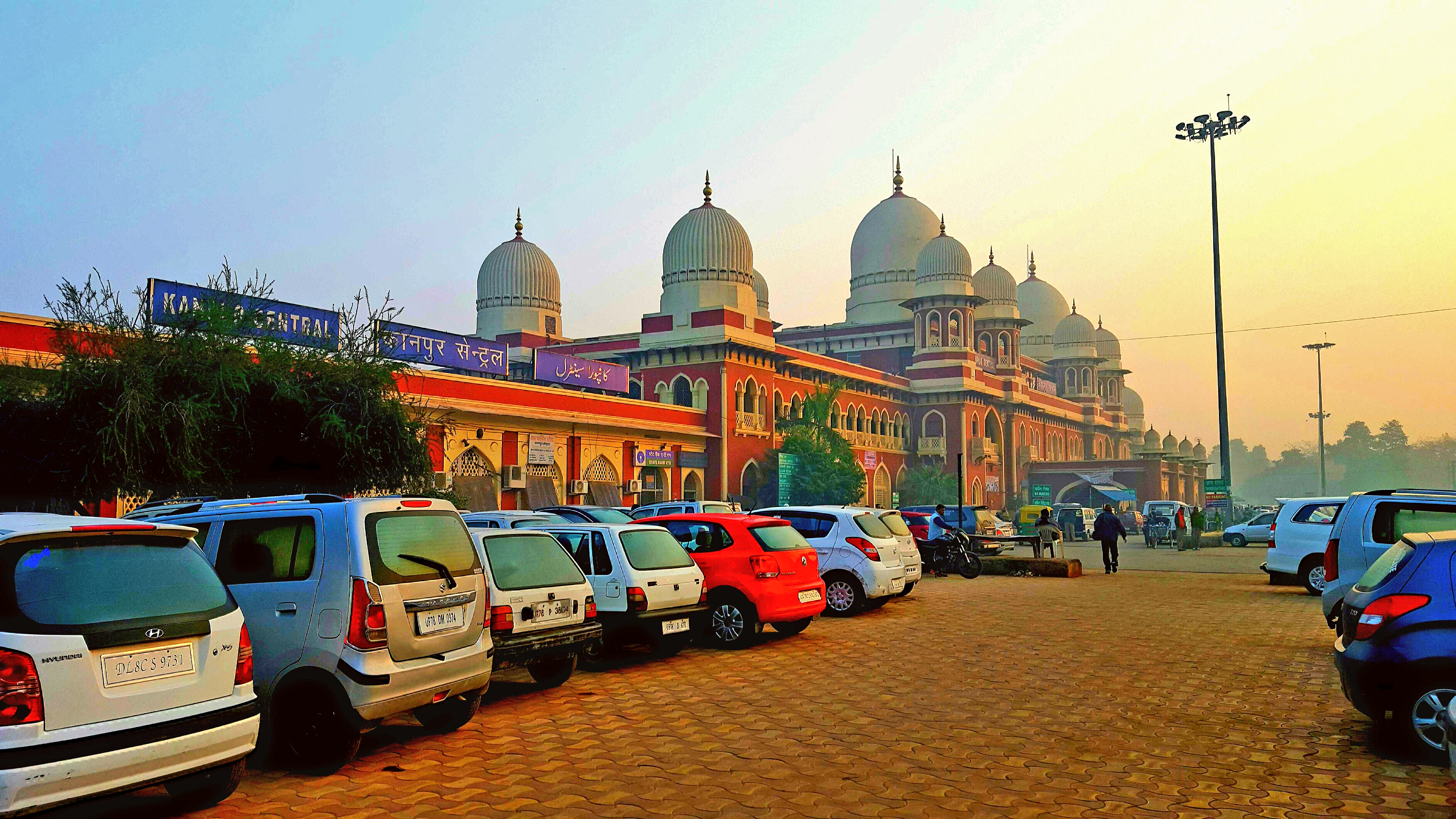
Kanpur Central Railway Station

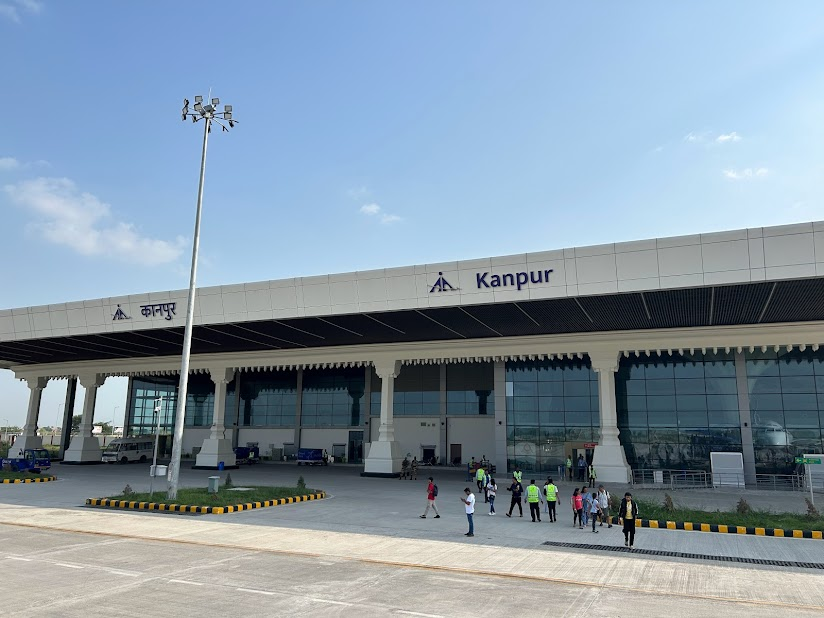
Kanpur Airport

IIT Kanpur metro station

=== Air ===
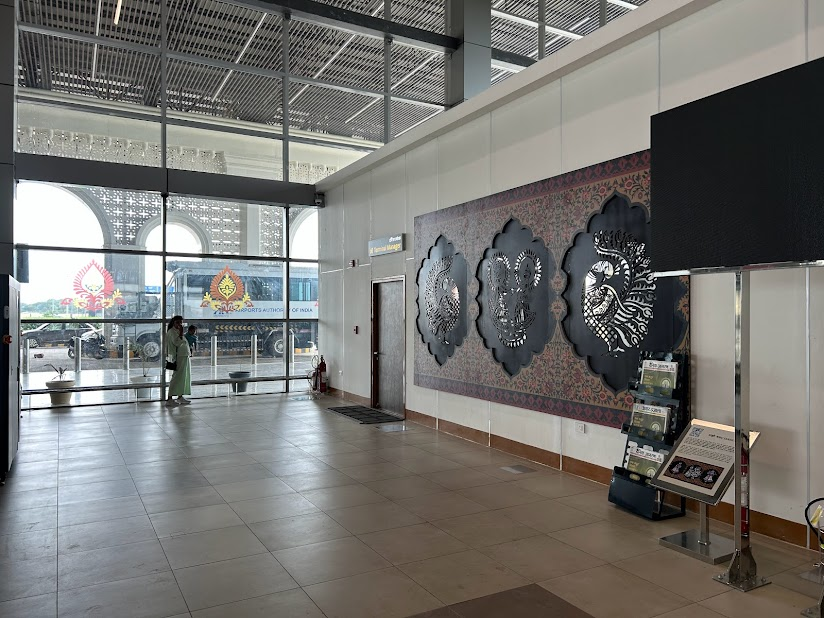
Kanpur Airport

Kanpur Airport is a domestic airport and has direct scheduled commercial non-stop flights to New Delhi, Mumbai, Hyderabad and Bangalore. The nearest international airport to the city is the Chaudhary Charan Singh International Airport in Lucknow, which is around 77.1 kilometres (47.9 mi) away.

=== Rail ===
Kanpur Central is a major railhead and is among the busiest railway stations in the country. Rail routes connect it to all major cities in the state and the country. It is an A-1 category railway station that comes under the Prayagraj railway division of the North Central Railway zone of Indian Railways. Around 300 trains pass through it daily. Kanpur has eleven railway stations in addition to the main Kanpur Central:

Station name	Station code	Railway zone	Total platforms
Kanpur Central	CNB	North Central Railway	10
Kanpur Anwarganj	CPA	North Central Railway	3
Rawatpur	RPO	North Eastern Railway	1
Kalyanpur	KAP	North Eastern Railway	1
Mandhana Junction	MDA	North Eastern Railway	2
Brahmavart	BRT	North Eastern Railway	1
Govindpuri	GOY	North Central Railway	3
Panki Dham	PKD	North Central Railway	3
Chandari Junction	CNBI	North Central Railway	2
Chakeri	CHK	North Central Railway	2
Rooma	Rooma	North Central Railway	2
Kanpur Bridge Left Bank	CPB	Northern Railway	3

==== Metro ====
The Kanpur Metro is a mass rapid transit system owned and operated by the Uttar Pradesh Metro Rail Corporation (UPMRC). It consists of two lines, the Orange Line and the Blue Line. The priority corridor of the Orange Line, which connects IIT Kanpur to Motijheel, was inaugurated by Prime Minister Modi on 28 December 2021. Another 5 underground stations were opened on 30 May 2025 by PM Modi, making the total 16 km operational.

=== Road ===
The city has the historically important Grand Trunk Road which serves as the lifeline of the city. There are several important national highways and expressways that pass through and around Kanpur.

NH/NE number	Route	Length
NH 19	Delhi, Mathura, Agra, Kanpur, Allahabad, Varanasi, Mohania, Aurangabad, Barhi, Palsit, Asansol, Kolkata	1435
NH 27	Porbandar » Udaipur » Kota » Shivpuri » Jhansi » Kanpur » Lucknow » Darbhanga » Alipurduar » Guwahati » Silchar	3507
NH 34	Gangotri Dham » Rishikesh » Haridwar » Bijnore » Ghaziabad » Aligarh » Kannauj » Kanpur » Hamirpur » Mahoba » Chhatarpur » Jabalpur » Lakhnadon	1426
NH (proposed)	Kanpur » Raebareli » Sultanpur » Shahganj » Azamgarh » Gaura Barhaj » Siwan » Muzaffarpur	581
NE 6 Awadh Expressway (Under Construction)	Kanpur to Lucknow	62.76
NE 7 Kanpur-Noida Expressway (Proposed)	Kanpur to Kannauj to Mainpuri to Bulandshahr to Noida Branch Hapur	380
Ganga Expressway	Haridwar » Meerut » Shahjahanpur » Kanpur » Raebareli » Prayagraj » Varanasi » Ballia	1024
Outer Ring Road Kanpur	Kanpur Metropolitan Area	93

Ring road: In 2011, it was reported by The Indian Express that the National Highways Authority of India (NHAI) planned to develop a four-lane outer ring road along the periphery of Kanpur with an aim to prevent traffic congestion in the city caused by long-distance heavy vehicles. The new road, which would help heavy vehicles to bypass the city, would be developed on Built, Operate and Transfer (BOT) basis under the phase-VII of National Highways Development Programme (NHDP).

== Economy ==
Kanpur is an important economic center in India with a GDP of ~$9 billion. According to GDP per capita, it ranks 9th in Uttar Pradesh. Noida and Meerut rank first and second, while the state capital Lucknow ranks seventh.

== Education and research ==
=== Higher education ===
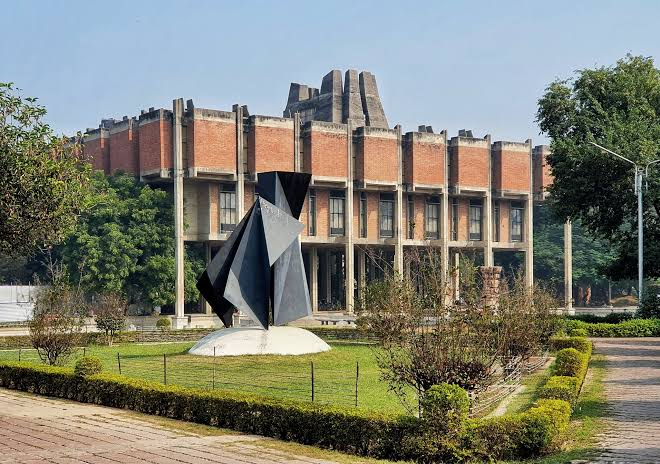
A building at IIT Kanpur

The Indian Institute of Technology Kanpur (IIT Kanpur) is a public technical and research university located in Kanpur, Uttar Pradesh, India. It was established in 1959 as one of the first Indian Institutes of Technology (IITs), with the assistance of a consortium of nine US research universities as part of the Kanpur Indo-American Programme (KIAP).

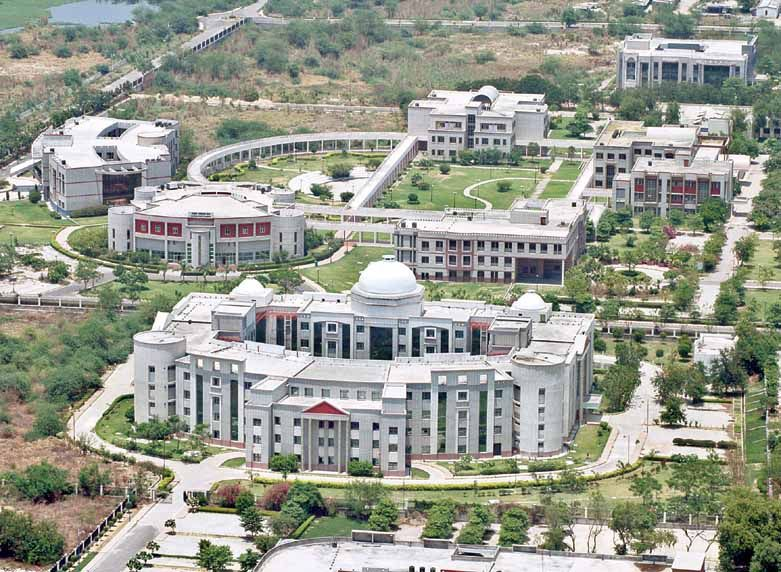
Aerial view of Chhatrapati Shahu Ji Maharaj University

Other educational institutions in the city include three state universities. Chhatrapati Shahu Ji Maharaj University is one of the largest universities in northern India and caters to urban and rural students, offering professional and academic courses in the Arts, Science, Commerce, Law, Engineering, Biotechnology, Computer Applications, Management and Medicine.

Chandra Shekhar Azad University of Agriculture and Technology is an agricultural university named after the Indian revolutionary Chandrashekhar Azad which caters to the needs of the farming community of 29 districts of Uttar Pradesh.

Harcourt Butler Technical University (HBTU) offers Bachelors, Masters, and Doctoral programs in engineering, as well as Masters programs in Business Administration, and Computer Applications. Dr. Ambedkar Institute of Technology for Handicapped provides technical education to specially-abled students. Inaugurated by former Prime Minister Atal Bihari Vajpayee in 1997, it is also situated in Kanpur.

National Sugar Institute (NSI) is involved in research, training and advisory services to the sugar and allied industry, and functions under the Department of Food and Public Distribution of the Ministry of Consumer Affairs, Food and Public Distribution.

There are also private universities in the city such as Rama University, which is part of the Rama Group. There are several private technical and management institutions in the city such as the Pranveer Singh Institute of Technology and the Axis Institute of Technology And Management, which are affiliated with Dr. A. P. J. Abdul Kalam Technical University.

== Notable people ==
- Lala Kamlapat Singhania, industrialist
- Padampat Singhania, industrialist
- Kuldeep Yadav, cricketer
- Harish-Chandra, mathematician
- Giriraj Kishore, novelist
- Irshad Mirza, industrialist
- Gaurav Khanna, actor
- Rajeev Shukla, political commentator and former journalist
- Kamal Nath, politician
- Tanmay Srivastava

== See also ==
- Akbarpur Lok Sabha constituency
- List of cities in Uttar Pradesh by population
- List of engineering colleges in Kanpur
- List of twin towns and sister cities in India
- Second Battle of Cawnpore
- List of Indian metropolitan areas by GDP
