= Kanpur Cantonment =

- City
- Location in Uttar Pradesh, India
- Coordinates: 26.44°N 80.37°E
- Country: India
- State: Uttar Pradesh
- District: Kanpur

Government
  - Body: Kanpur Cantt Police Station

Population (2011)
  - Total: 108,035

Languages
  - Official: Hindi, English, Urdu & Kannauji
- Time zone: UTC+5:30 (IST)
- PIN: 208004
- Vehicle registration: UP-78
- Nearest city: Kanpur
- Sex ratio: 847/1000 males ♂/♀
- Literacy: 79.65%
- Lok Sabha constituency: Kanpur Cantts
- Vidhan Sabha constituency: Kanpur Cantts(w), Kanpur Cantts(e), Kanpur Cantts - Rural
- Civic agency: Cantt Police Station
- Website: https://kanpur.cantt.gov.in/

Kanpur Cantonment (popularly referred to as Kanpur Cantt) is a military cantonment in Kanpur, Uttar Pradesh, India. The Kanpur Cantonment was established in the year 1811 and is situated on the right bank of river Ganges and is bound by Kanpur city area on the remaining three sides. Kanpur Cantonment is the largest cantonment in India, by population and not by the area. The area of the Cantonment is approx. 4243.0084 acres (17 km^{2}) out of which the Bungalow Area is 3899.1784 acres and the Civil Area is 334.83 acres. As per 2011 Census, the population of Cantonment is 108,035 which is 453rd largest city of India (See t he point 2 on external links).

== History ==
The historical reasons necessitating the formation of individual cantonments are different for different cantonments depending upon the prevailing political and military realities of the times.

For example, Secundrabad cantonment was established to assist the Nizam of Hyderabad, militarily against his local adversaries, whereas Lucknow Cantonment was established to maintain pressure on the Nawab of Oudh and to finally capture that state. Similarly, the need for cooler climate for the British troops and strategic importance of Doab dictated the setting up of hill cantonments and cantonments in modern-day Uttar Pradesh respectively.

However, irrespective of the local factors, the paramount consideration in setting up all these cantonments was the need for military camps in various strategic locations of India to establish, maintain and consolidate the rule of a foreign power.

Spread of diseases such as diarrhea, malaria, and venereal diseases among the troops necessitated the cantoning (insulation) of these military camps from the local population.

The records of 19th-century British India reveal that health and hygiene of the troops was one of the major areas of concern which the rulers of the day had to contend with. This consideration coupled with the desire of an alien ruling elite to distance itself from the native population led to the development of an insulated type of character in all these cantonments which continues today.

The Kanpur Cantonment played an important role in the 1857 uprising under the leadership of Nana Sahib and Tatya Tope (see Siege of Cawnpore). The uprising led to a massacre of the British at the Satichaura Ghat (also called Massacre Ghat). It is of historical significance symbolising the casualties during the Indian Rebellion of 1857. Many religious/social functions are organized every year in the months of August and September to commemorate the events, which are attended by a large number of people.

== Demographics ==
As per provisional reports of Census India, population of Kanpur Cantonment in 2011 is 108,035; of which male and female are 58,505 and 49,530 respectively. The sex ratio of Kanpur Cantonment city is 847 per 1000 males.

In education section, total literates in Kanpur Cantonment city are 77,484 of which 44,086 are males while 33,398 are females. Average literacy rate of Kanpur Cantonment city is 79.65 percent of which male and female literacy was 83.36 and 75.23 percent.

Total children (0-6) in Kanpur Cantonment city are 10,750 as per figure from Census India report on 2011. There were 5,617 boys while 5,133 are girls. Child sex ratio of girls is 914 per 1000 boys.

Kanpur Cantonment city is governed by Municipal Corporation which comes under Kanpur Urban Agglomeration.

== Geography ==
The high population, location of a large number of important defence installations and units and the strategic location of the cantonment itself within the highly industrialised city of Kanpur, places it in a predominant position among the various cantonments of the country. Cantonment consists of varieties of Trees. About half of the cantonment is a Tree grouped area.

== Government ==
Presently, the cantonment is governed by the Cantonments Act, 2006 and various policy letters and instructions of the Government of India, (Ministry of Defence) issued from time to time. Though the Board functions as a local self -govt, yet it is under the administrative control of Director General, Defence Estates (Min of Defence ) at New Delhi and Principal Director, Defence Estates, Central Command, Lucknow. The GOC-in-C, Central Command functions as the local Govt for all purposes. The Cantonment Board consists of 16 Members headed by the President Cantonment Board, who is also the Station Commander, and Ex-Officio/Nominated Members apart from 8 Members, who are elected for five years by the local residents. The Vice-President is elected from amongst the elected members. Presently, the Board consists of the following members.

== Urban life ==
Keeping with its tradition of dedicated service of the community, the Cantonment Board during the past years has accepted the challenges of the changing times and has provided high grade facilities in many spheres of the urban life by establishing many institutions to render essential standard services to the citizens. Primarily, the Board provides municipal services, community facilities and civic utilities including water supply, sanitation, street-lighting, roads, medical, educational, and recreational facilities. The Board also strives, as per the National Policy, for the environmental upgradation by planting trees, bushes, decorative plants, etc.

Building Plans

Any person who intends to construct/reconstruct, make alteration or additions should apply to the office of the Cantonment Board on the prescribed application form which can be purchased from the Cashier on any working day. Each form costs Rs.30/-. All inquiries including advice on deficiencies in applications/documents will be attended across the table by the staff of the Engineering section on all working days between 3.00 P.M to 5.00 P.M.

B. The applications for mutation of properties, conversion of old grant into free-hold and renewal of leases of properties are accepted by the Lands Clerk. The time period for processing the documents is as follows:

== Transport ==
Kanpur Central is in the Kanpur Cantonment. Chandari Junction railway station is near the centre but has only EMU/Passenger train stops. Kanpur Civil Airport is in Kanpur Cantt and domestic flights are available here for cities like Delhi, Mumbai, Ahmedabad, Kolkata, etc. It is also used for flight training. The nearest international airport is Lucknow Airport.

== Tourist attractions ==
- Massacre Ghat
- Kanpur Memorial Church
- Golf Club
- Lal Kurti Cemetery/Golf Course Road Cemetery
- OEF Stadium
- Saint Patrick's Church
- Saint Mary's Church
- General Wheeler's Entrenchment
- Presbyterian Church
- Cawnpore Club
- Status Club
- Mahatama Gandhi Park
- Circuit House (Old Mr. Christie's House)

== Parks ==
- Mahatma Gandhi Park (Shantipath)
- Shaheed Park (Tagore Road)
- Abdul Hameed Park (Albert Road)
- Priyadarshini Park (Shanti Path)
- Harita Park (MG road)
- Ashoka Park (81-D Allahabad xing)
- Maitri Park (Elliot road)
- Sadbhawana park (Rani Chinamma Marg)
- Kranti Vatika (Jaipuria Rd)
- Lal Bhadur Shastri Park (Jaipuria road)
- Shantinagar Park (Shantinagar)
- Ekta Vatika (Tank Road)
- 4 Rani Chinamma Vatika (Rani Chinamma Marg)
- 2 Park Setu vatika (under Murray Flyover)
- Dr. Rajendra Prasad Park (Railbazar)
- Ullas Park (Tilak Marg)
- Safalta Park (C.C. Parao).

== Shopping ==
The Cantonment Board maintains 2 open markets namely Faithfulganj and Country Cart (C.C.) Parao, and the rights to collect tehbazari are auctioned every year. Besides, there are 2 Shopping Complexes: namely the Paper Market and 10 No. Market consisting of 12 shops each, which are also maintained by the Board. Apart from this, there are 106 other shops located at various places. The rights of the usage of all the shops are disposed of for a term of 5 years on licence basis through open auction or tendering.

- Markets (Open)=2 Country Cart Parao, Faithfulganj
- (Shopping Complex)=2 Paper Market, 10 No. Market
- Shops= 106

== Electricity ==
The Cantonment Board maintains about 4000 tubelight, 200 CFL and 800 sodium vapour lamp street-light points provided on roads, streets, and lanes under its management with the assistance of two maintenance gangs each having a truck with hydraulic ladder. High Mast lights introduced on important road crossings. The citizens can register the complaints relating to street lights in the office and the action as follows is taken to rectify the defects.

- Streetlighting = SVL Points-800
- Tubelight points - 4,000
- CFL Points - 200

== Education ==
To contribute towards 100% literacy, the Cantonment Board is running 5 primary schools and 2 Junior High Schools for imparting education to the children primarily belonging to the weaker sections of society by charging nominal fees. The Schools are managed by 35 well-qualified and trained teachers with absolute devotion to the national cause, imparting education to about 1500 children. To improve the infrastructure and to provide better environment with proper ventilation, all school buildings have been repaired/renovated. All the Schools have facilities like drinking water, electricity, fans, lights, benches and toilets. To provide elementary education to the children, a computer education is also imparting from class IV onwards for the past 5 years. For the entertainment/overall development of personality of the students, game facilities like footballs, dumb-bells, band, carrom boards are provided in the schools. Public address system has been provided in 2 Schools. Particular emphasis is given to cultural activities. Medical check-up camps are organised to maintain the healthy environment and to check spread of any communicable disease in the students and to suggest remedial measures if any adverse report is reported. Mid-day meals, scholarships and free books are also provided in schools. Private security guards are also engaged in Cantt Board schools.

The Schools are located at different places in the area keeping in view the concentration of population.

== Water supply ==
The piped water supply consisting of underground reservoir and pumping station in the cantonment was provided by the Kanpur Development Board in 1962, and no further extension or augmentation was taken since then to meet the demands of the rising population. This resulted in absolute water crisis in many areas of the cantonment. The Cantonment Board entrusted the work of preparation of an augmentation/reorganisation project to U.P. Jal Nigam in 1986, which was launched in July, 1989. The project was completed in March 2000 at a cost of Rs. 3.53 crores.

The Cantonment Board is providing water supply through its underground reservoir at Zonal Pumping Station located at Mirpur, and two overhead tanks located at M.G. Park and near Navsheel Aptts., through a network of 35 km of pipelines. The Board buys water in bulk from Kanpur Jal Sansthan apart from the water drawn from the six tubewells maintained by the Board. Out of which 4 tubewells and 2 overheads are maintained by the contractor. About 650 India Mark-II Hand pumps have also been provided at various places to support the piped water supply system and to cater for the requirement of poor residents. All the hand pumps are maintained properly. To meet the water requirement of the residents for particular purposes and occasions like marriages, religious functions, social gatherings, cultural activities, the Board maintains 2 water tankers of 4000 litres capacity each, which are made available against payment of Rs.300/- each.

Public health

The Cantonment Board is providing conservancy services with the help of about 200 safaiwalas and a fleet of one JCB Excavator loader, 1 JCB loader and four rubbish dumper, one dumper placer with 40 iron dustbins. The cantonment is broadly divided into two areas for this purpose i.e. civil area and the bungalow area. Dustbins are provided at suitable central locations from where it is removed and disposed of at the trenching ground near Badey Purwa Village. Cleaning of ward no 1, 2 and 4 are done through contractors.

== See also ==
- Cantonment#India
- Kanpur
