= Massacre Ghat =

- सती चौरा घाट / मसकर घाट
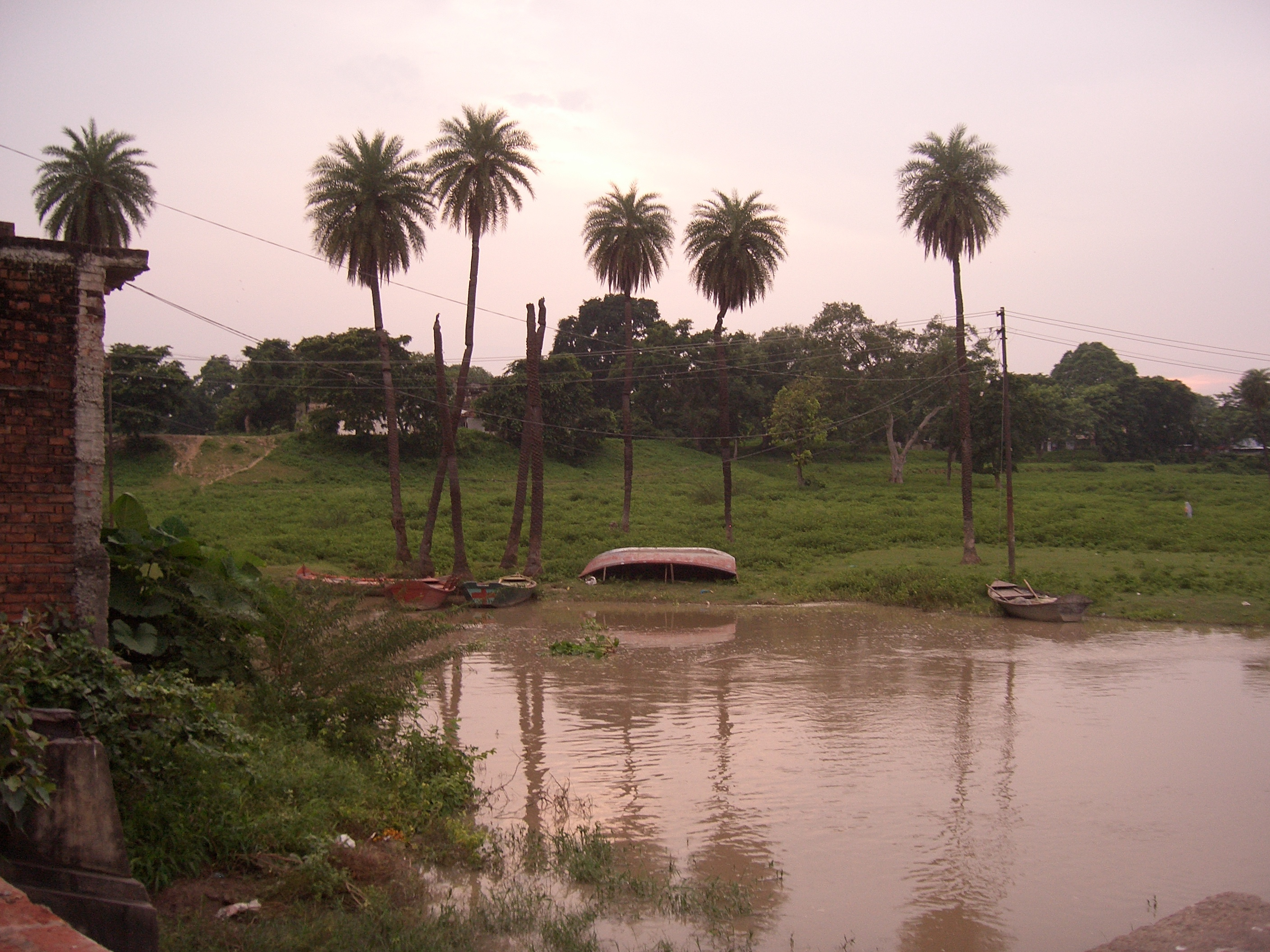
- Satti Chaura Ghat, Kanpur, Ganges river.

- Location in Uttar Pradesh

Religion
- Affiliation: Hinduism
- District: Kanpur Nagar

Location
- Location: Kanpur
- State: Uttar Pradesh
- Country: India
- Interactive map of Massacre Ghat
- Coordinates: 26.458759°N 80.380923°E

Architecture
- Temple: 1

Satti Chaura Ghat (Satī Caurā Ghāţ) or Massacre Ghat is a famous ghat in Kanpur, the industrial hub of Uttar Pradesh state in north India. It is located on the bank of the River Ganges in Kanpur Cantonment near Jajmau.

== Geography ==
The ghat is located on the southern bank of River Ganges and marks the northern boundary of Kanpur city.

River ghats have been a traditional part of Indian religious life. They have served religious and community gathering purposes. When located on rivers like the Ganges that Hindus consider holy, they often have attached temples dedicated to deities of the Hindu pantheon.

Satti Chaura Ghat has been an important maritime boarding point for the river route from Kanpur to Allahabad from pre colonial period. In recent years, after the acquisition of the surrounding areas by Cantonment Board and private industrialists, it has receded in its traditional historical importance as the centre of urban life in the old city of Kanpur.

== History ==
Satichaura or embankment of satis had been a place years ago some women had committed sati and in commemoration a small temple with stone steps along the bank to facilitate bathing, had been built.

The origins of the ghat date to pre-colonial times.

It was at this location that the initial momentous events of Indian Rebellion of 1857, named as Siege of Cawnpore in British colonial records, took place. The ghat was renamed as Massacre Ghat after the rebellion. It is now under the charge of the Kanpur Cantonment Board. It is still in use as a bathing and ritual ghat for local population.

=== The siege ===
This Ghat has become historically important since the Indian Sepoy Mutiny of 1857. On 27 June 1857, Kanpur (then spelled as Cawnpore) saw one of the grimmest stories of Indian history of independence. Around 200 British men, women and children were murdered at the Satti Chaura Ghat, later gaining identification as Massacre Ghat. Those who escaped the brutal fate that day were later killed at the Bibighar Massacre. The rebellion was believed to be led by the Peshwa Nana Sahib from which the Ghat was renamed as Nana Rao Ghat.

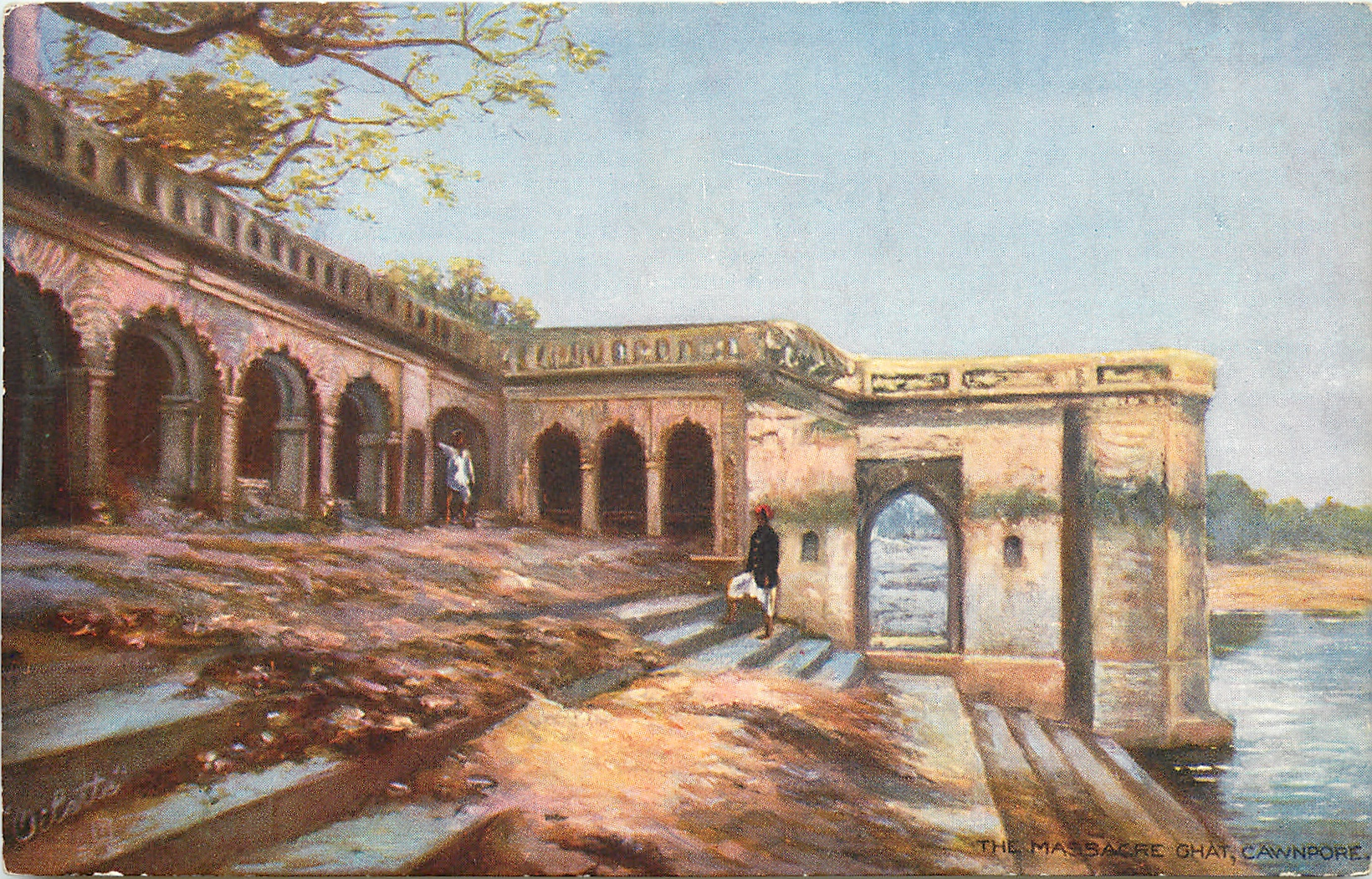
Postcard featuring the Massacre Ghat, Kanpur.

A contemporary image of the massacre at the Sattichaura Ghat	1858 picture of Sati Chaura Ghat on the banks of the Ganges River.

== Attractions ==
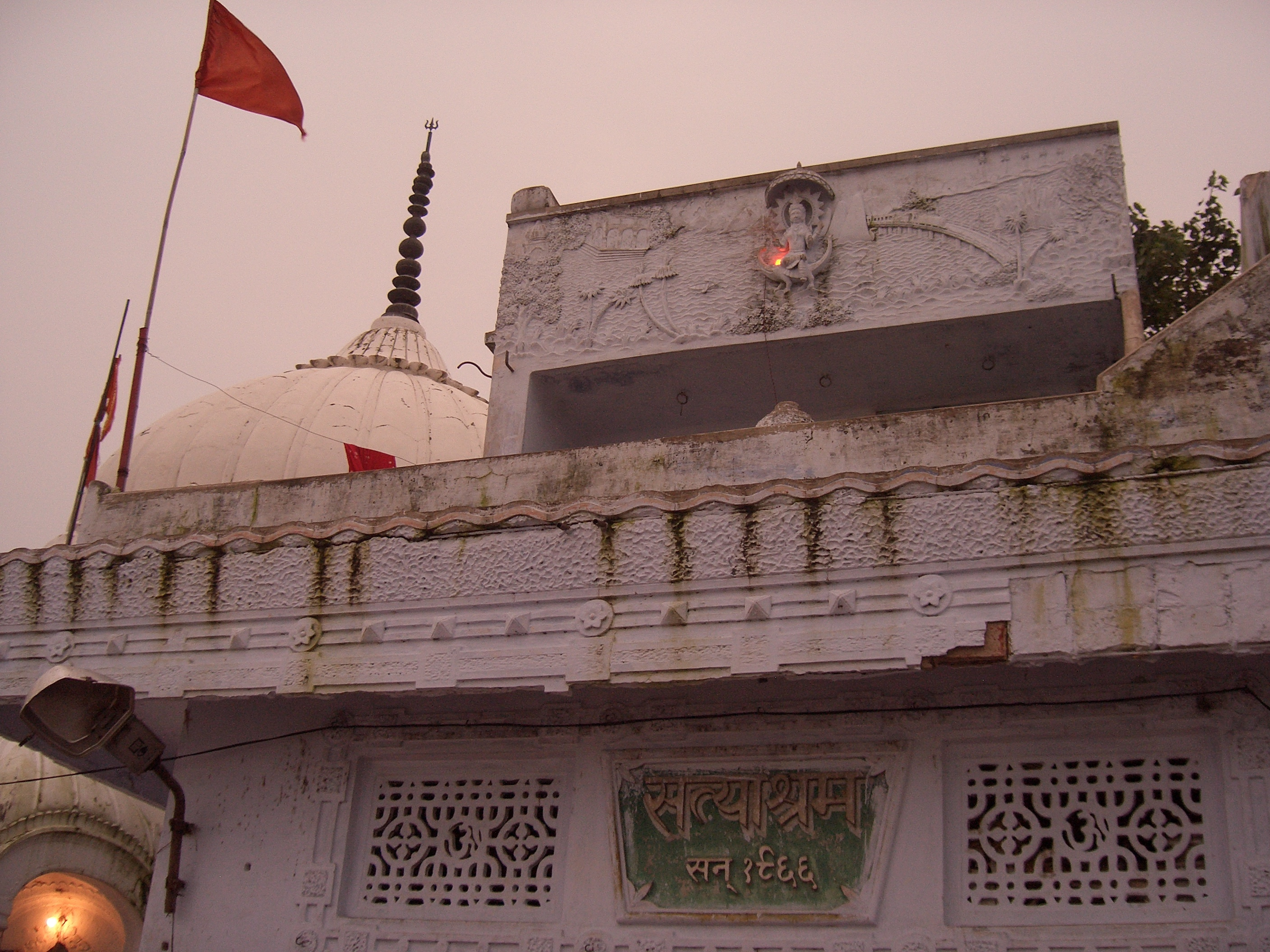
Satya Ashrma Mandir at Satti Chaura Ghat, Kanpur, India

- A Hindu temple built in 1966.
- It attracts a lot of visitors from Kanpur city during the monsoon months when the River Ganges threatens to breach the banks.
- There is a sand pit / dangal (अखाड़ा) for kushti of local wrestlers. An annual wrestling competition is held during the months of July/August.
