= Brahmavart railway station =

Railway station in Uttar Pradesh, India

- Indian Railways logo

General information
- Location: Brahmavart, Bithoor, Kanpur, Uttar Pradesh; India
- Coordinates: 26.6035°N 80.2727°E
- Elevation: 127 metres (417 ft)
- System: Indian Railways station
- Owner: Indian Railways
- Operator: North Eastern Railway
- Platforms: 1
- Tracks: 2
- Connections: Auto stand

Construction
- Structure type: Standard (on-ground station)
- Parking: No
- Cycle facilities: No

Other information
- Status: Construction – gauge conversion
- Station code: BRT
- Zone(s): North Eastern Railway
- Division(s): Lucknow NER
Location
- Location within India Location within Uttar Pradesh

Brahmavart railway station is a small railway station in Kanpur district, Uttar Pradesh. Its code is BRT. It serves Bithoor city. The station consists of a single platform. The platform is not well sheltered. It lacks many facilities including water and sanitation.
