= Kanpur Memorial Church =

Church in Kanpur, India

Coordinates: 26.4506°N 80.3693°E

- All Souls Church
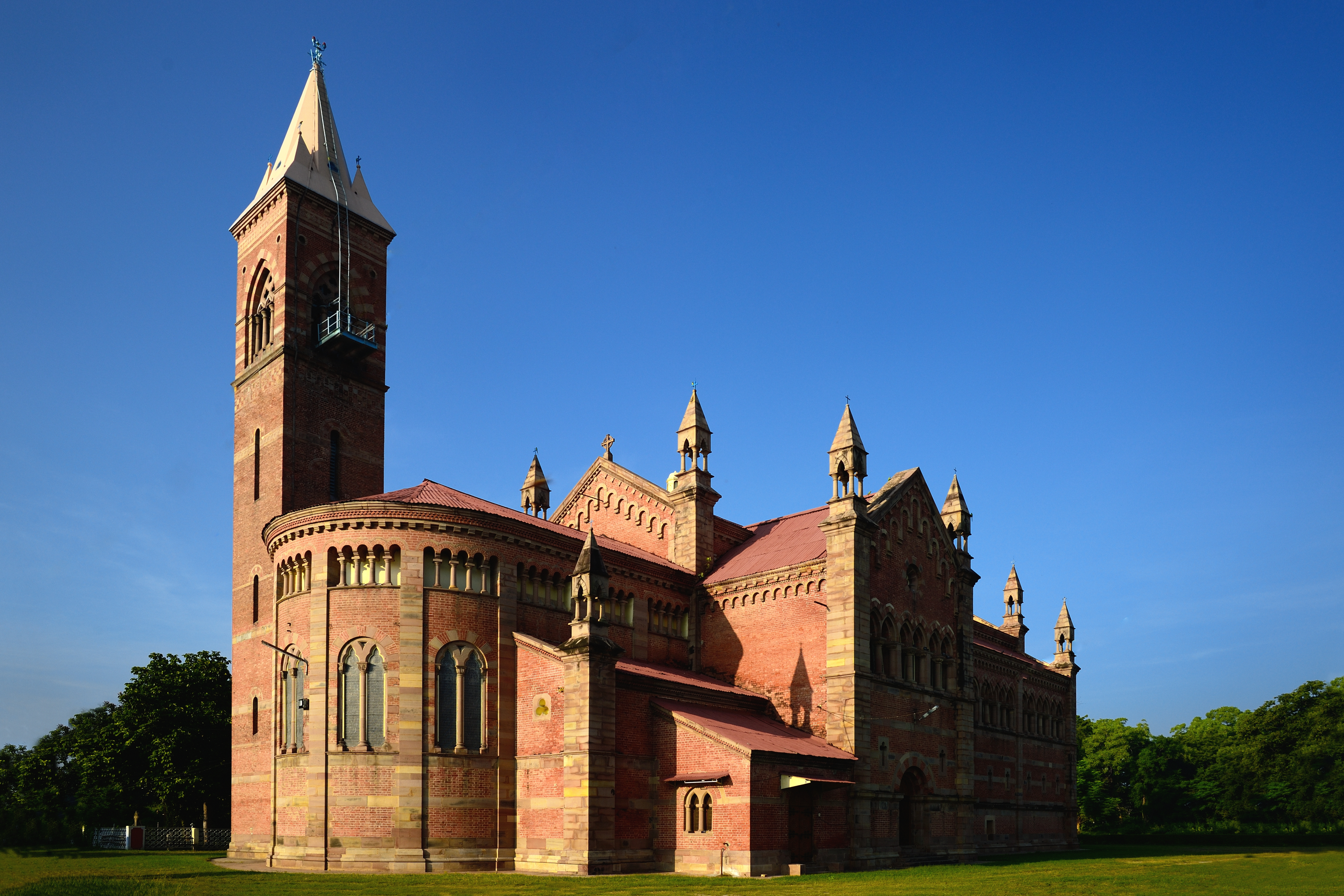
- Kanpur Memorial Church
- Country: India
- Denomination: Church of North India

History
- Consecrated: 1876

Architecture
- Completed: 1876

The Kanpur Memorial Church, also known as the All Souls' Church, is a church located in Kanpur, India that belongs to the Church of North India, a united Protestant denomination. It was completed and consecrated in 1876 to commemorate fallen British soldiers during the Siege of Cawnpore in 1857.

An initial proposal to build a church in Kanpur came from the United Society Partners in the Gospel.

== Location ==
The church is situated on Albert Lane near Cawnpore Club in Kanpur Cantonment. It is situated at boundary of the cantonment.

== Architecture ==
The church was designed by Walter Granville, architect of the East Bengal Railway. The complete church in Lombardic Gothic style is attractively executed in bright red brick with polychrome dressings.

To the east of the church is the memorial garden which can only be approached through one gateway. It has a handsome carved Gothic screen designed by Henry Yule. Its centre is occupied by a beautiful carved figure of an angel by Baron Carlo Marochetti, with crossed arms, holding palons, i.e. symbols of peace. This carved figure was created in memory of the Bibighar massacre, where Indian rebels killed approximately 200 European women and children with guns and cleavers, throwing their remains into a nearby well and burying some survivors under the pile of bodies.

== Gallery ==
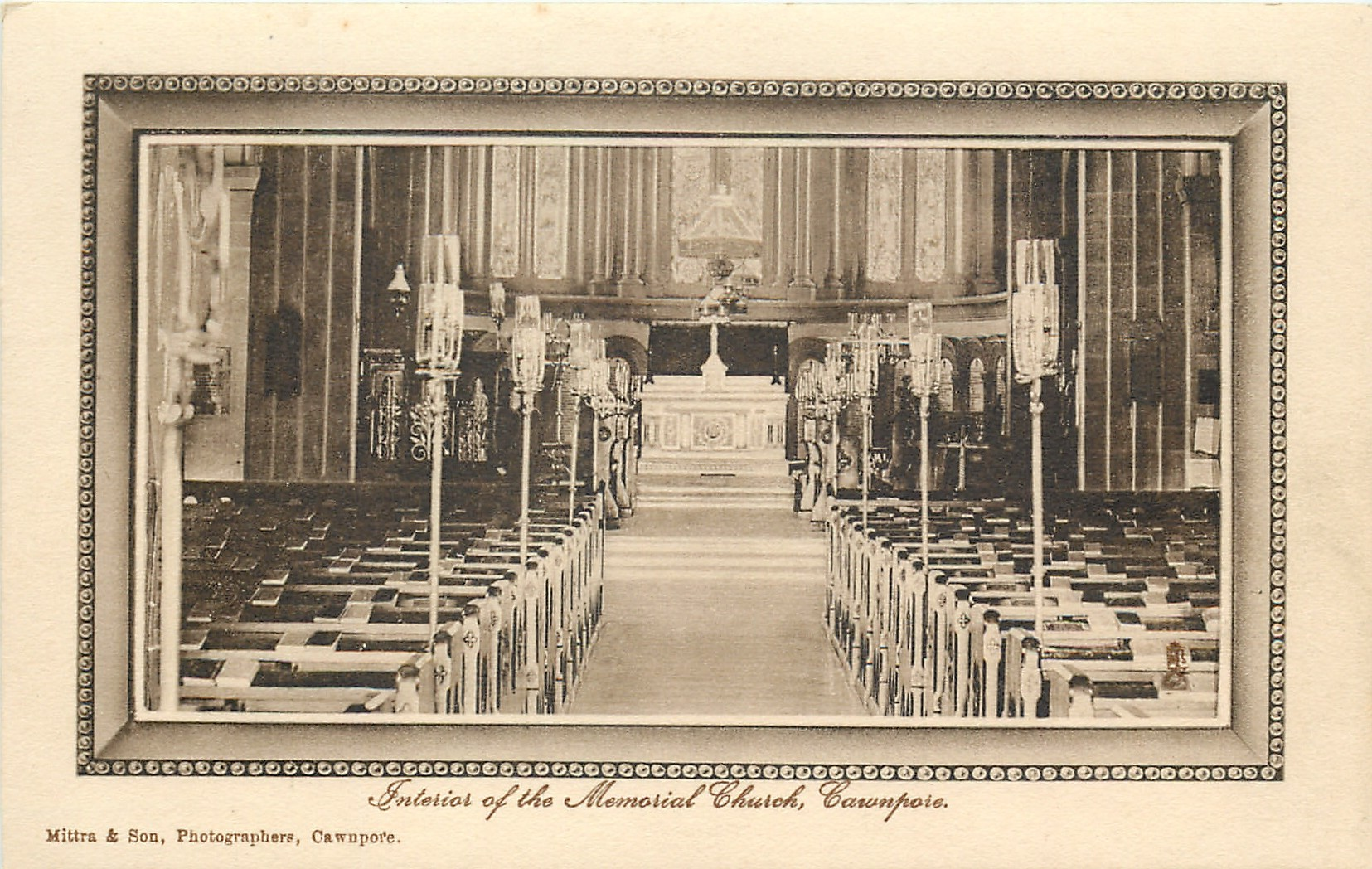
The interior of All Souls Church (20th century)

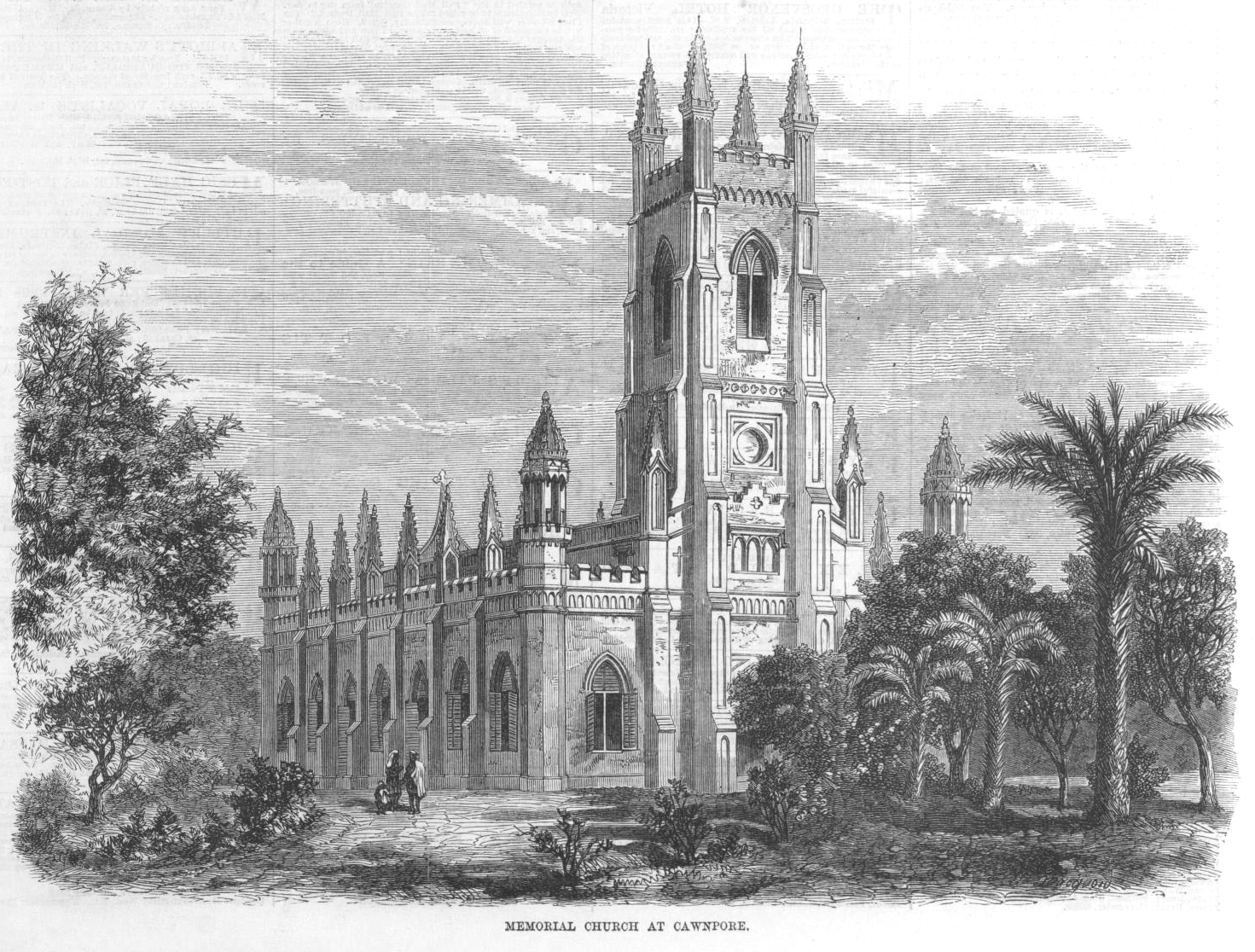
The exterior of All Souls Church (1868)

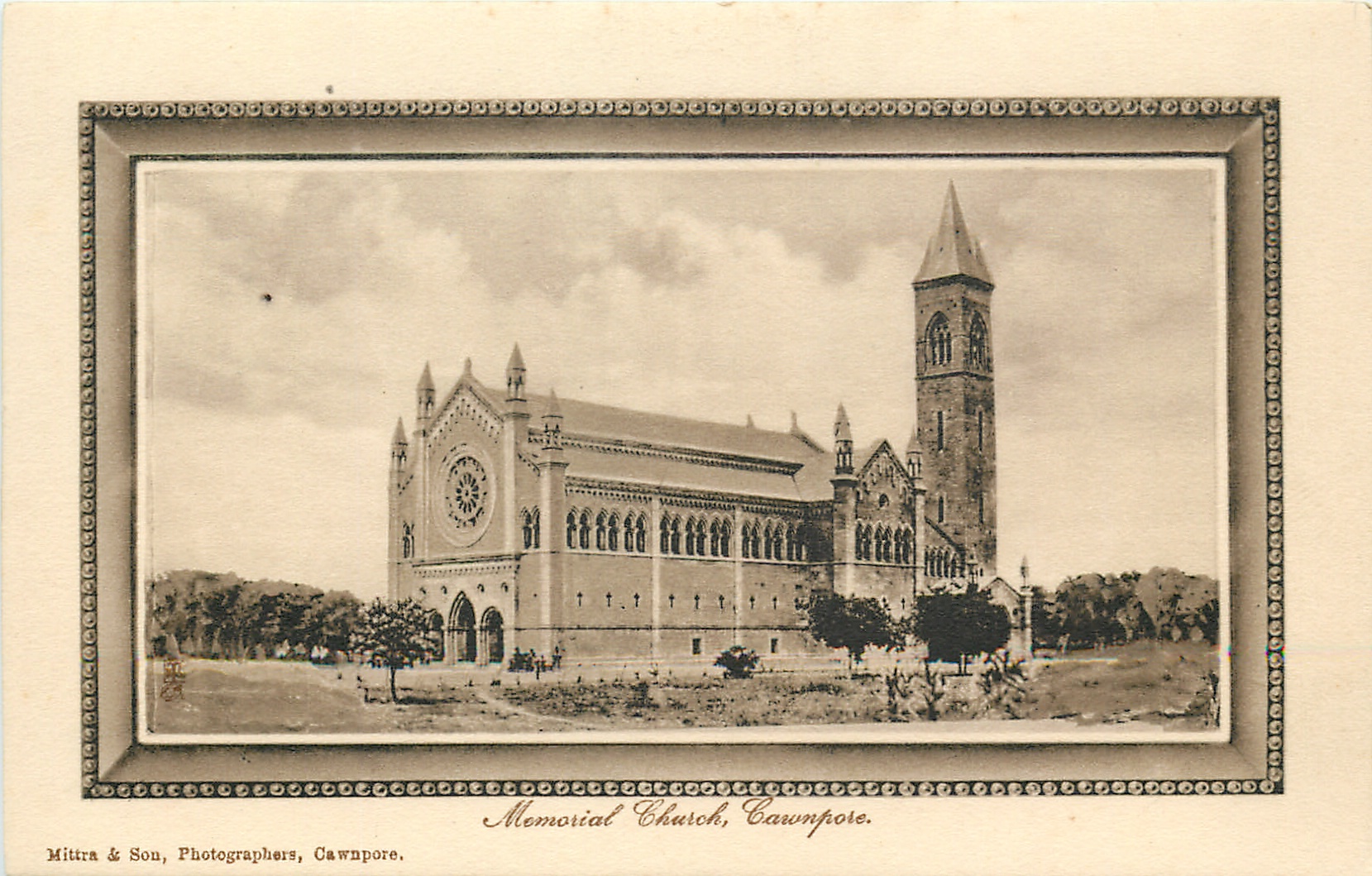
The exterior of Memorial Church (20th century)

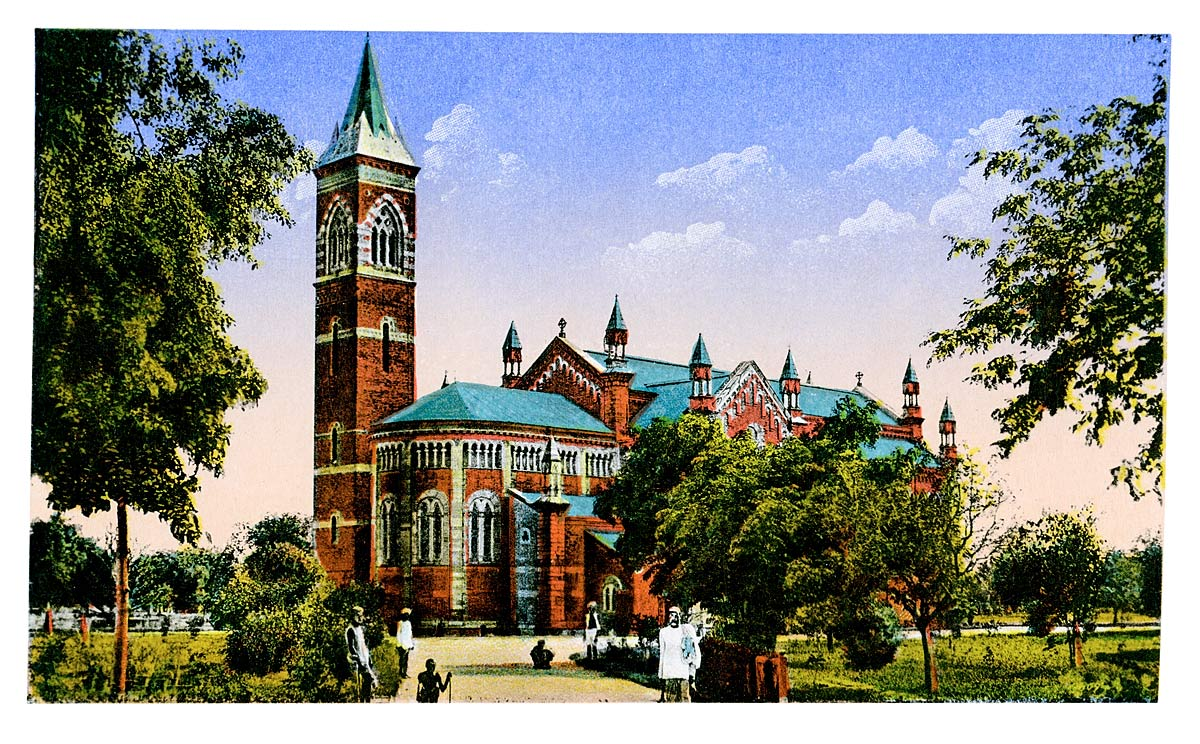
The exterior of Memorial Church (1905)

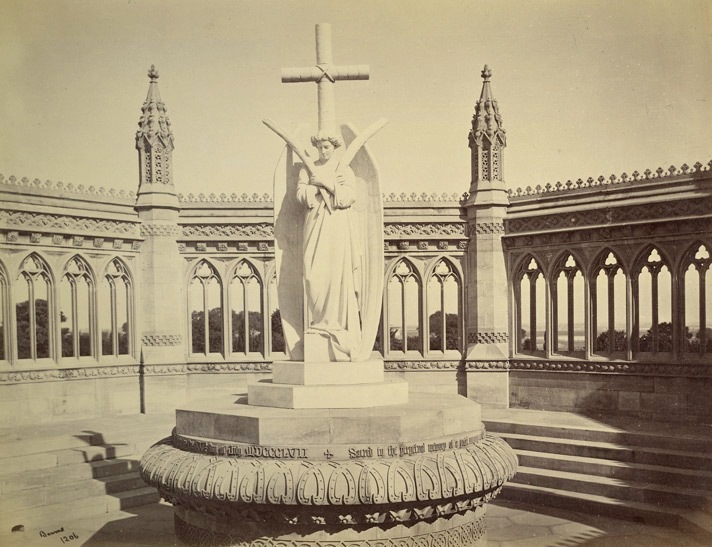
Cawnpore Memorial (1860)

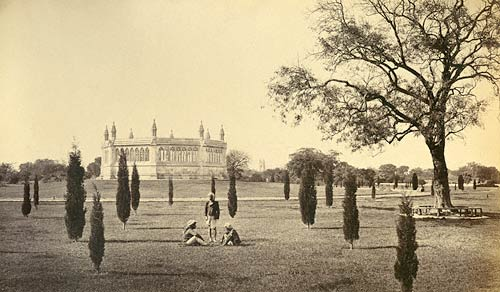
The well at Cawnpore, with the Memorial Church in the background

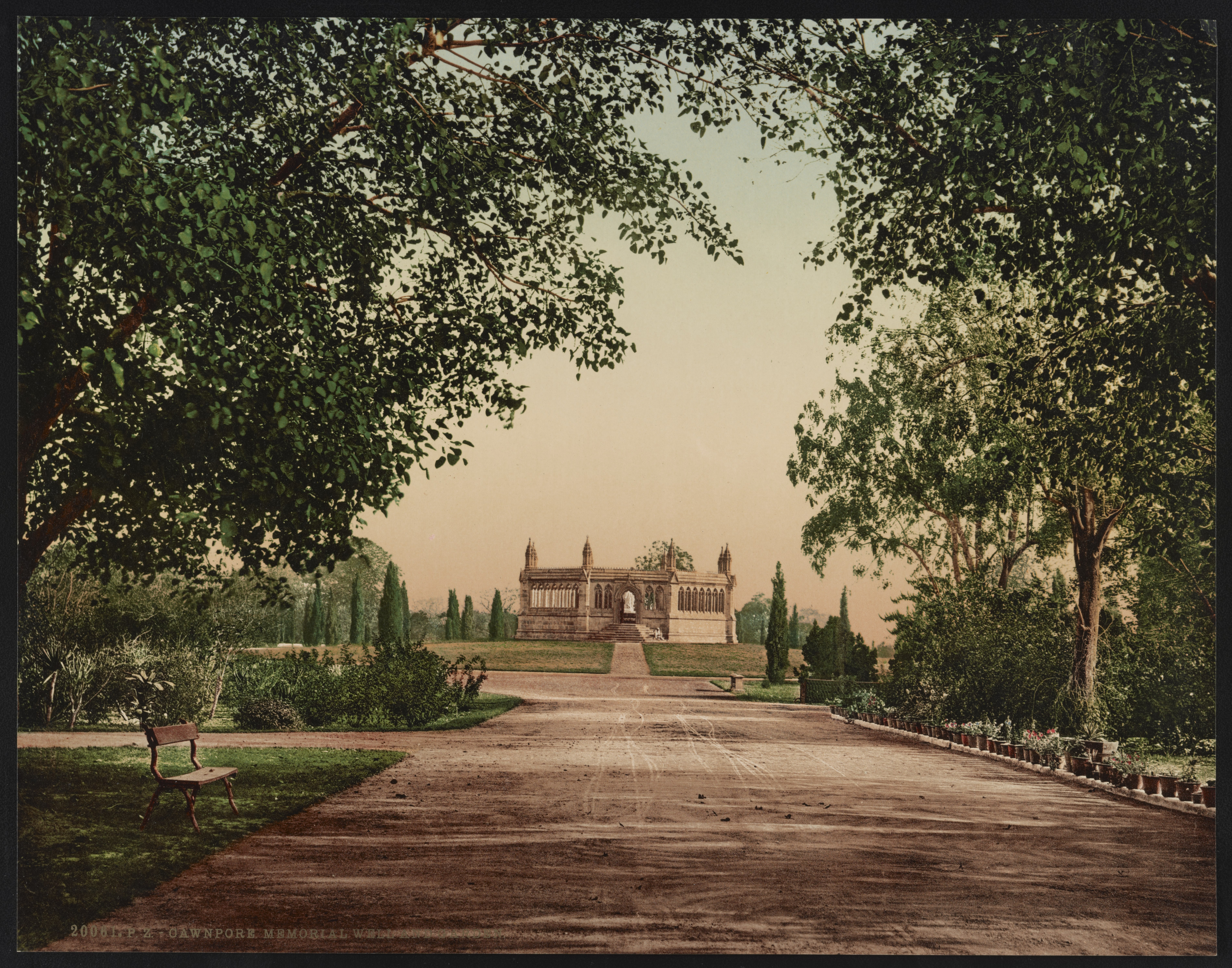
Cawnpore Memorial Well and Garden (1890)

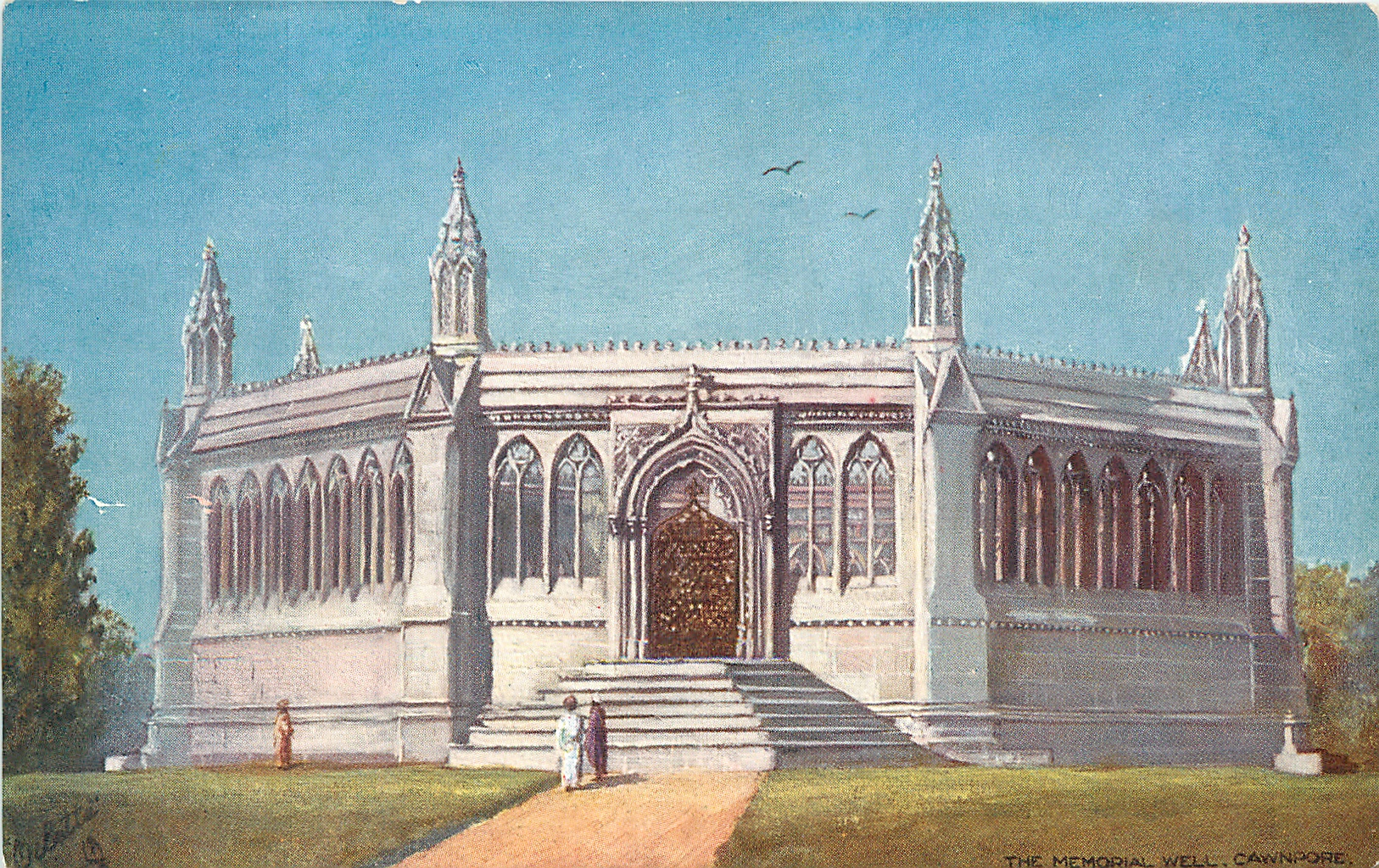
The Memorial Well, Cawnpore
