= Chandari Junction railway station =

Railway station in Uttar Pradesh, India

Chanderi Junction

General information
- Coordinates: 26.4280°N 80.3602°E
- Platforms: 2

Other information
- Station code: CNBI
Location
- Location within India Location within Uttar Pradesh

Chandari Junction railway station is on the Kanpur-Prayagraj line. Currently EMU/Passenger trains only stop here. There has been a proposal to convert Chandari into a terminal station.
