= Corbin =

Corbin may refer to:

== People and fictional characters ==
- Corbin (given name), a list of people
- Corbin (surname), a list of people and fictional characters
- Corbin (musician), American rapper, singer, songwriter and record producer Corbin Smidzik (born 1998)
- Baron Corbin, a ring name of professional wrestler, former professional football player and former amateur boxer Tom Pestock (born 1984)

== Places ==
=== Canada ===
- Corbin, British Columbia, a ghost town
- Corbin, Burin Peninsula, Newfoundland and Labrador, a settlement
- Corbin, Fortune Bay, Newfoundland and Labrador, a settlement

=== United States ===
- Corbin, Georgia, an unincorporated community
- Corbin, Kansas, an unincorporated community
- Corbin, Kentucky, a home rule-class city
- Corbin, Missouri, a ghost town
- Corbin, Montana, an unincorporated community and ghost town
- Corbin, Virginia, an unincorporated community
- Corbin, West Virginia, an unincorporated community
- Corbin City, New Jersey, a city
- North Corbin, Kentucky, a census-designated place
- Corbin Creek, North Carolina - see Corbin Creek Falls
- Corbin Park, a private game preserve in New Hampshire

== Buildings ==
- Corbin Building, a historic building located at 192 Broadway in New York, United States
- Corbin Cabin, a log structure in Shenandoah National Park, United States
- Corbin Covered Bridge, a covered bridge in New Hampshire, United States

== Other uses ==
- 4008 Corbin, a main-belt asteroid discovered in 1977
- Corbin (automobile), an early twentieth century automobile
- Corbin Motors, a 1990s manufacturer of sporty electric and hybrid vehicles, now Myers EV
- Corbenic, also called Corbin, the castle in Arthurian legend which holds the Holy Grail

== See also ==
- Grady v. Corbin, a decision by the United States Supreme Court
- Corbin/Hanner, a singing duo
- Corbin Fisher, an American film studio with a focus in gay pornography
- bec de corbin, a type of pole weapon popular in medieval Europe
- Corben, a surname
- Corbyn (name), an Anglicised version of Corbin used as both a given name and surname
- Corbins, a municipality in Spain
- Saint Corbinian, a Frankish bishop
