= Corban =

Corban may refer to:

== People ==
- Corban of Cluana (died c. 732), Irish saint
- Corban Baxter (born 1994), Australian rugby league player
- Corban Collins (born 1994), American basketball player
- Corban Joseph (born 1988), American baseball player
- Corban Knight (born 1990), Canadian ice hockey player
- Corban Wroe (born 1992), Australian basketball player
- Alexandru Corban (born 1998), Romanian footballer
- Assid Abraham Corban (1864–1941), New Zealand winemaker, founder of Corbans, a winery
- Sofia Corban (born 1956), Romanian retired rower
- Teodor Corban (1957–2023), Romanian actor

== Other uses ==
- Corban, Switzerland, a municipality
- Corban University, a private Christian college in Oregon, United States
- Korban, also spelled corban, any of a variety of ancient Hebrew sacrifices or offerings to God
- Corban Yaxley, a character in the Harry Potter fictional universe

== See also ==
- Corbans, a New Zealand winery
- Corben, a list of people and fictional characters with the surname
- Corbin (disambiguation)
- Corbyn (name), a list of people with the given name or surname
- Korban (name) a list of people with the given name or surname
- Kurban (disambiguation)
