= Corbyn (name) =

Corbyn is a surname and a given name. Notable people with the name include:

== Surname ==
- Frederick Corbyn (1791–1853), British surgeon in India
- Jeremy Corbyn (born 1949), British politician and leader of the Labour Party 2015–2020
- Piers Corbyn (born 1947), British activist and conspiracy theorist, brother of Jeremy Corbyn
- Thomas Corbyn (chemist) (1711–1791), English chemist
  - Corbyn, Stacey & Company, which existed as Corbyn before 1772
- Thomas Corbyn (politician) (fl. 1410s), English member of parliament

== Given name ==
- Corbyn Besson (born 1998), American singer, member of the band Why Don't We
- Corbyn Dolley (born 1987), South African cricketer
- Corbyn Morris (1710–1779), English official and economic writer
- Corbyn Smith (born 1998), Canadian sledge hockey player

== See also ==
- Corban (disambiguation)
- Corben, a surname
- Corbijn, Dutch surname
- Corbin (disambiguation)
