= John Andaman =

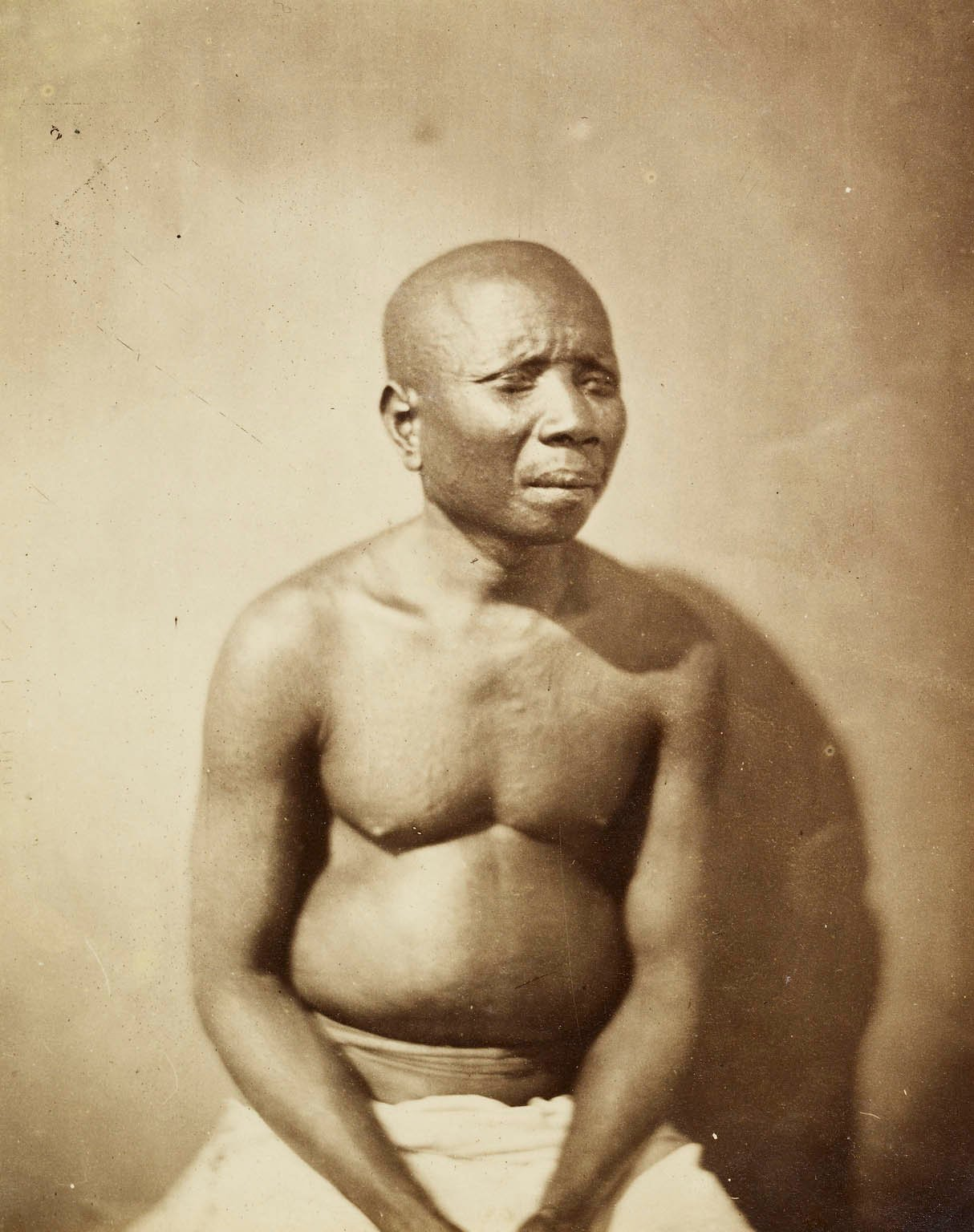
Portrait of John Andaman by Oscar Mallitte (December 1857 or January 1858)

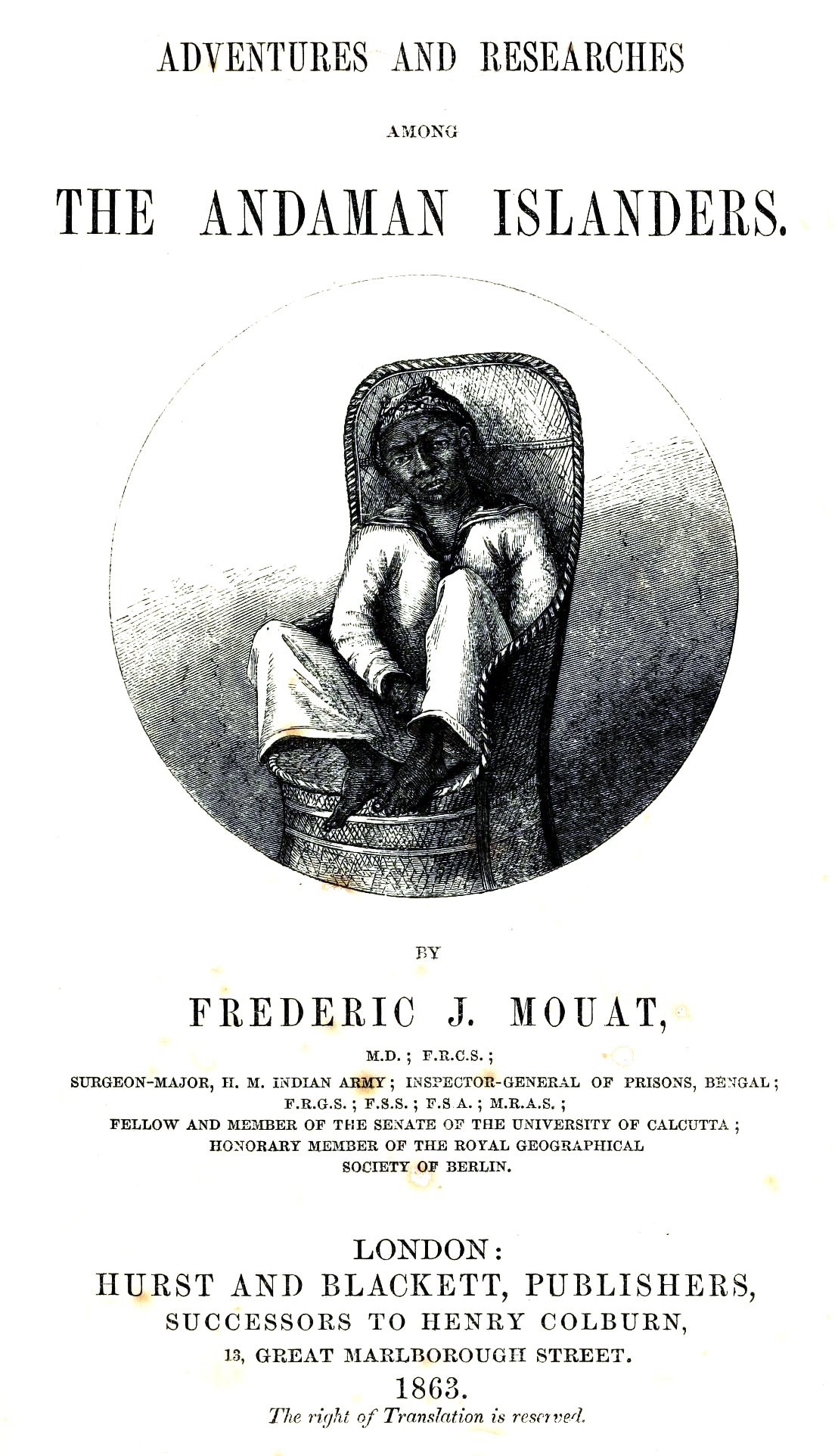
Title page of Mouat's book with an engraving based on a sketch of John Andaman by Colesworthey Grant. The illustration also appeared in Harper's Weekly and the Illustrated London News. Mouat claimed that Grant's picture depicted the "mild, gentle, and benevolent" expression perfectly.

John Andaman or Jack Andaman (captured January 1858 and returned in the same year) was the name given to an Andaman native (or Mincopie as then termed) who was taken captive aboard a British navy ship near Interview Island on a survey of the Andaman Islands under Frederic J. Mouat. He was taken to Calcutta and returned to the place of his capture when ill health began to torment him. It has been suggested that Sir Arthur Conan Doyle described Tonga, an Andamanese native character, in his 1890 novel The Sign of Four based on Mouat's description of John Andaman.

== Context and capture ==
In 1858, a British survey was undertaken to identify a suitable penal colony to deal with the large numbers of prisoners taken in the Indian Rebellion of 1857. The Andaman Islands were chosen. Although the islands had been surveyed by Robert Hyde Colebrooke and Archibald Blair in the past, it had not been permanently settled by the British. The survey aboard the Pluto began in November 1857 and was led by Frederic J. Mouat, George Playfair and Lieutenant J.A. Heathcote. The team also included French photographer Oscar Mallitte. When the group landed on Interview Island (Long Reef Island), they had judged to be a safe and friendly island on the accounts of J.H. Quigley titled Wanderings in the Islands of Interview, (Andaman), Little and Great Coco (1850). Mouat had asked Quigley if he would be interested to join the mission but he had refused. Quigley had reported the islanders to be very friendly and had written fantastic accounts of tigers, deer and fabulous plants which later led Mouat to make comparisons of the author with Baron Munchausen. While ashore, the team was attacked by the natives armed with arrows. They made a rapid exit and a second armed navy cutter moved in to keep the natives away. Heathcote was injured by an arrow to the thigh and in defence Mouat was forced to shoot a man he called the "chief". The natives finally pulled back but not before at least three were killed of which two of the bodies were taken aboard the navy boat. One of the natives, a strong swimmer, had managed to get quite close to the boat and when offered a strap and rope, he took it and came aboard. The crew called him "Jack" and the captive found company in Neptune, the dog aboard the ship, an animal he was unfamiliar with.

== Calcutta ==
In Calcutta, they found that John Andaman recognized none of the words in the vocabulary of the Andamanese compiled by R.H. Colebrooke. He imitated well and learnt to dress (to the point that he began to be ashamed of nudity, his original state), wash and always behaved with propriety. When shown a photograph of himself, he laughed and turned it around to see if his back was seen as well. Lady Canning wrote that he was "gentle and tractable and imitates everything and is amused at everything from a glass of water upwards". Pictures of John Andaman appeared in many places including the Illustrated London News.

Careful anthropological measurements were taken of John and published in the journals of various scholarly journals.

Mouat had photos of the two dead natives taken (and a copy went to Alexander von Humboldt who confirmed their racial classification as "Negrilloes") and their skulls were preserved and taken with him to London where they were studied and described by Professor Richard Owen in 1863.

As for John Andaman, the government report stated:

One of the natives, when in the water, seized a strap thrown to him from the second cutter, and was taken on board. The Committee deliberated anxiously as to disposal of this man, whether to release, or to carry him to Calcutta. They ultimately decided on the latter course as the one required by the interests of humanity, although attended with hardship to the individual, until he can he instructed sufficiently to know the reasons which led to his removal from his country and his kindred.

== Repatriation ==
John suffered in Calcutta and frequently took ill. He had cholera and then a lung infection leading to a decision by the Governor General to have him sent back from where he had been taken. There had been hope that he would spread the message of his captors' kindness among the natives with whom the British had failed to make any peace. Nothing was heard again about John.

Fifty copies of the photographs taken by Oscar Mallitte both on the journey to the Andamans as well as at Calcutta were made and these were thought to have been lost until one set was discovered in 2005 by a new curator appointed to the Queen's Collection at Windsor Castle. The set includes three photos of John Andaman including one in which he is dressed in a navy uniform.

In his novel The Sign of Four (1890), Sir Arthur Conan Doyle uses deprecating language that has been considered to be very similar to that used by Mouat to describe the character Tonga, an Andamanese. Doctor Watson reads a description of the Andamans from the Imperial Gazetteer of India of 1881 by W.W. Hunter which is in turn based on descriptions by others. The description quoted by Doyle reads:

They are naturally hideous, having large, misshapen heads, small fierce eyes, and distorted features. Their feet and hands, however are remarkably small. So intractable and fierce are they, that all the efforts of the British officials have failed to win them over in any degree. They have always been a terror to shipwrecked crews, braining the survivors with their stone-headed clubs or shooting them with their poisoned arrows. These massacres are invariably concluded by a cannibal feast.
