= Oscar Mallitte =

French photographer (1829–1905)

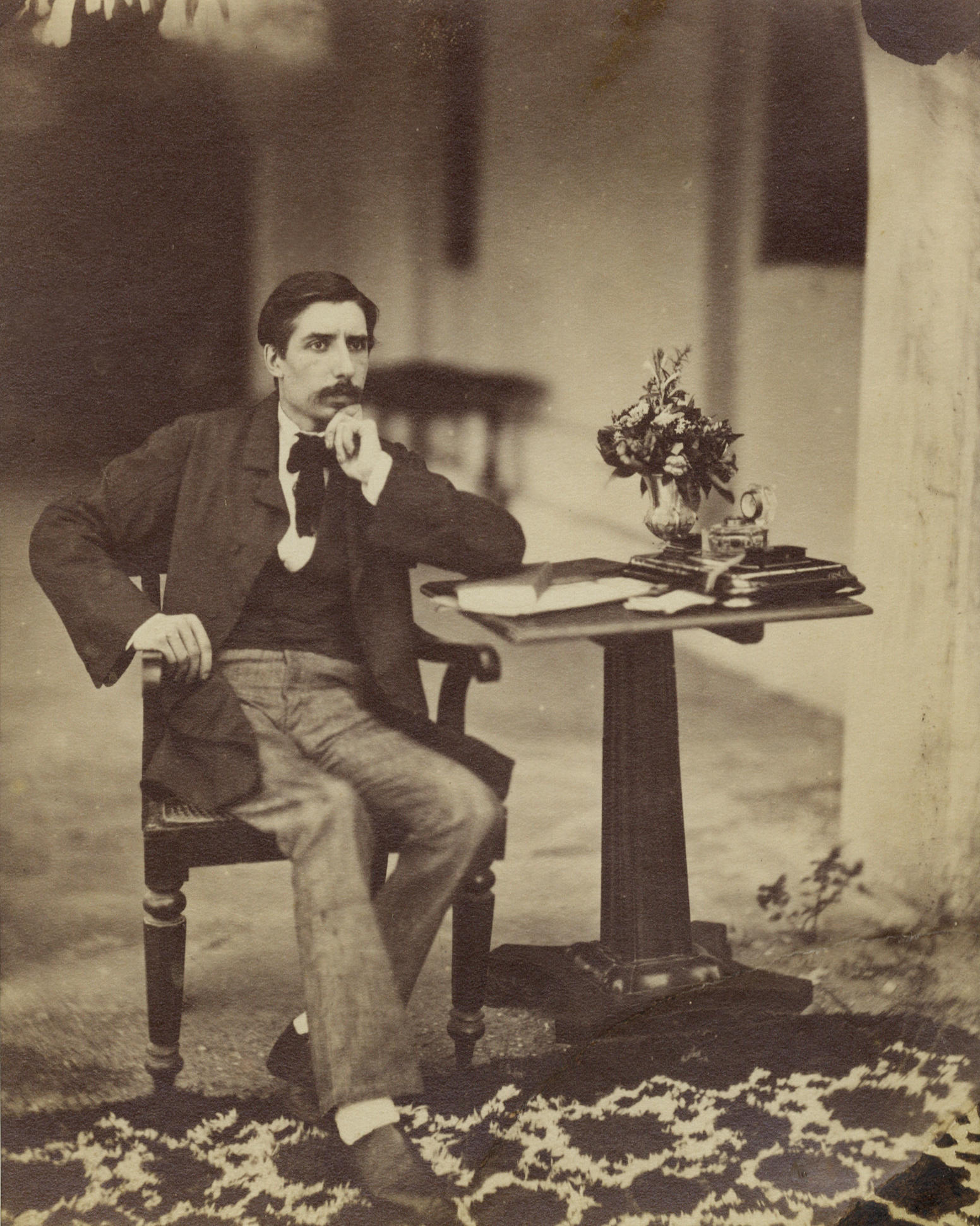
- Oscar Mallitte by John Murray
- Born: 1829
- Died: 13 June 1905 (aged 75–76); Kolkata
- Education: Faculty of Medicine, Paris
- Known for: Photography of Andaman Islands, Indian Rebellion of 1857 sites, Second Opium War

Oscar Jean-Baptiste Mallitte (1829 – 13 June 1905), was a French surgeon and photographer, known for his photographs at the Andaman Islands, being responsible for processing John Murray's negatives of the Indian Rebellion of 1857, and capturing images of the Second Opium War.

== Early life and education ==
Oscar Mallitte was born in 1829 and studied medicine at the Faculty of Medicine, Paris, where he possibly first met Frederic J. Mouat of the Bengal Medical Service. He began his career as a surgeon in France.

== Early photography ==
=== Andaman Islands ===
Mallitte left Bordeaux in 1857, and on 23 July that year reached Calcutta, where he shared the same address as Mouat. Later that year he joined Mouat with a British expeditionary party to survey the Andaman Islands for the purpose of founding a penal colony for prisoners of the Indian Uprising. Called the "Andaman Committee", the party had been formed at the instruction of Lord Canning and also included among its members the surgeon George Playfair and J. A. Heathcote, of the Royal Navy.

Their journey began in Calcutta, on the Semiramis on 23 November 1857 and reached Mawlamyine, where they transferred to the smaller Pluto. They arrived at Port Cornwallis on 11 December, after first sighting Narcondam Island. During the expedition Mallitte photographed landscapes, settlements, and native Andamanese inhabitants, producing a series of eleven images that were subsequently printed, mounted, and presented to the Government of India after the party returned to Calcutta. These included images of Barren Island, Port Blair, Ross Island, and three views of John Andaman.

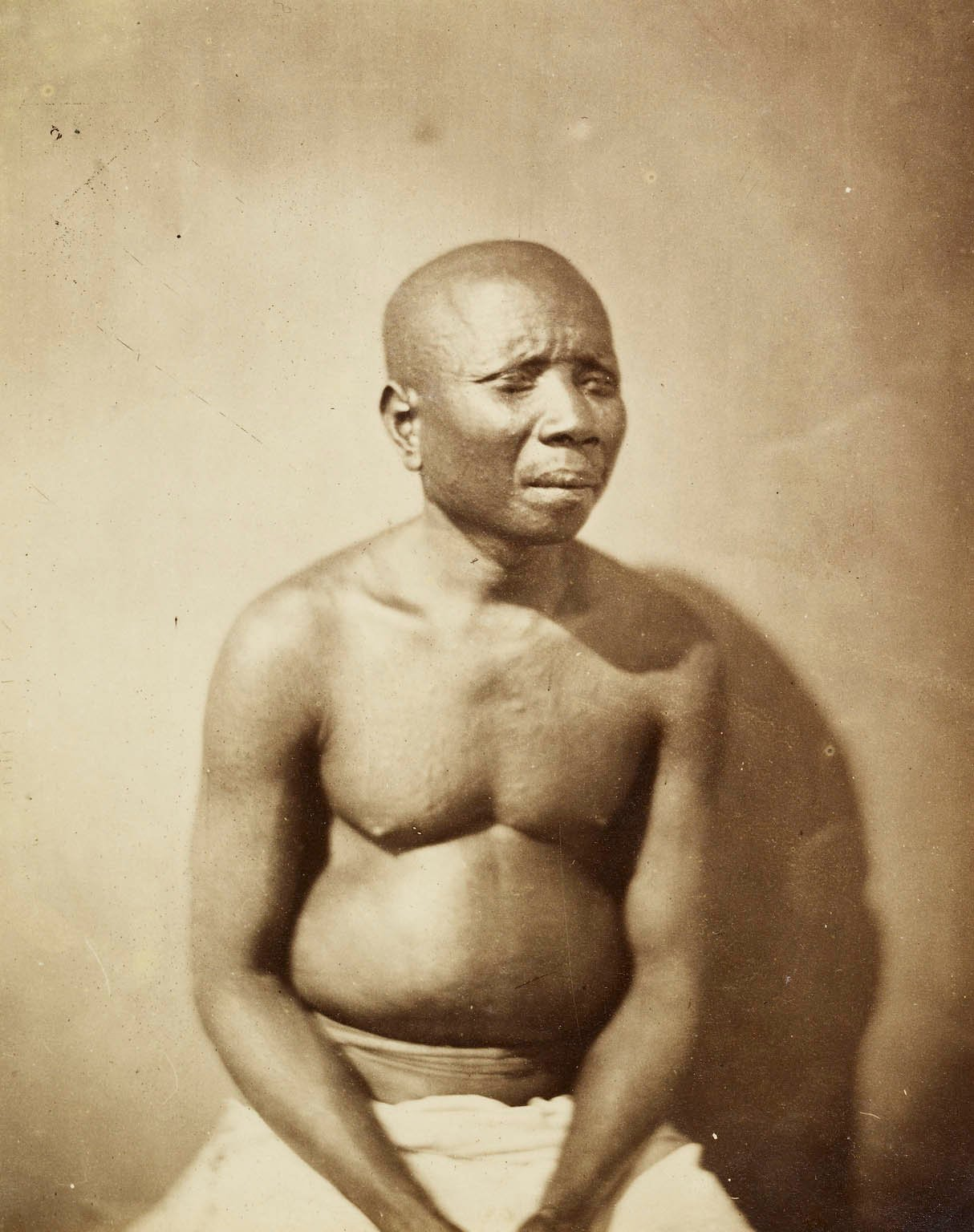
John Andaman

=== School of Industrial Art ===
After the Andamans Mallitte was appointed teacher of photography at the School of Industrial Art, and in that capacity became responsible for processing John Murray's negatives of the Indian Uprising.

== Later photography ==
Mallitte left the School of Industrial Art in 1859. That year, he exhibited his photographs at Bengal Photographic Society's meetings and in August that year presented at its second annual exhibition. A year later, he was a commercial photographer in Agra, and by September 1859 he was preparing works for the Lahore Chronicle.

=== Canning's tour ===
In late 1859 Mallitte was recruited by Lord Canning to accompany him on his tour of the Uprising sites of the North-Western Provinces, though it was noted by the New Times that much of the ruined sites and rubble had been cleared up by this time. Mallitte photographed the same view of Metcalfe House a year after Murray, documenting the clearing that had taken place since then, and also like Murray took a similar view of Humayan's Tomb, though with surrounding overgrown vegetation.

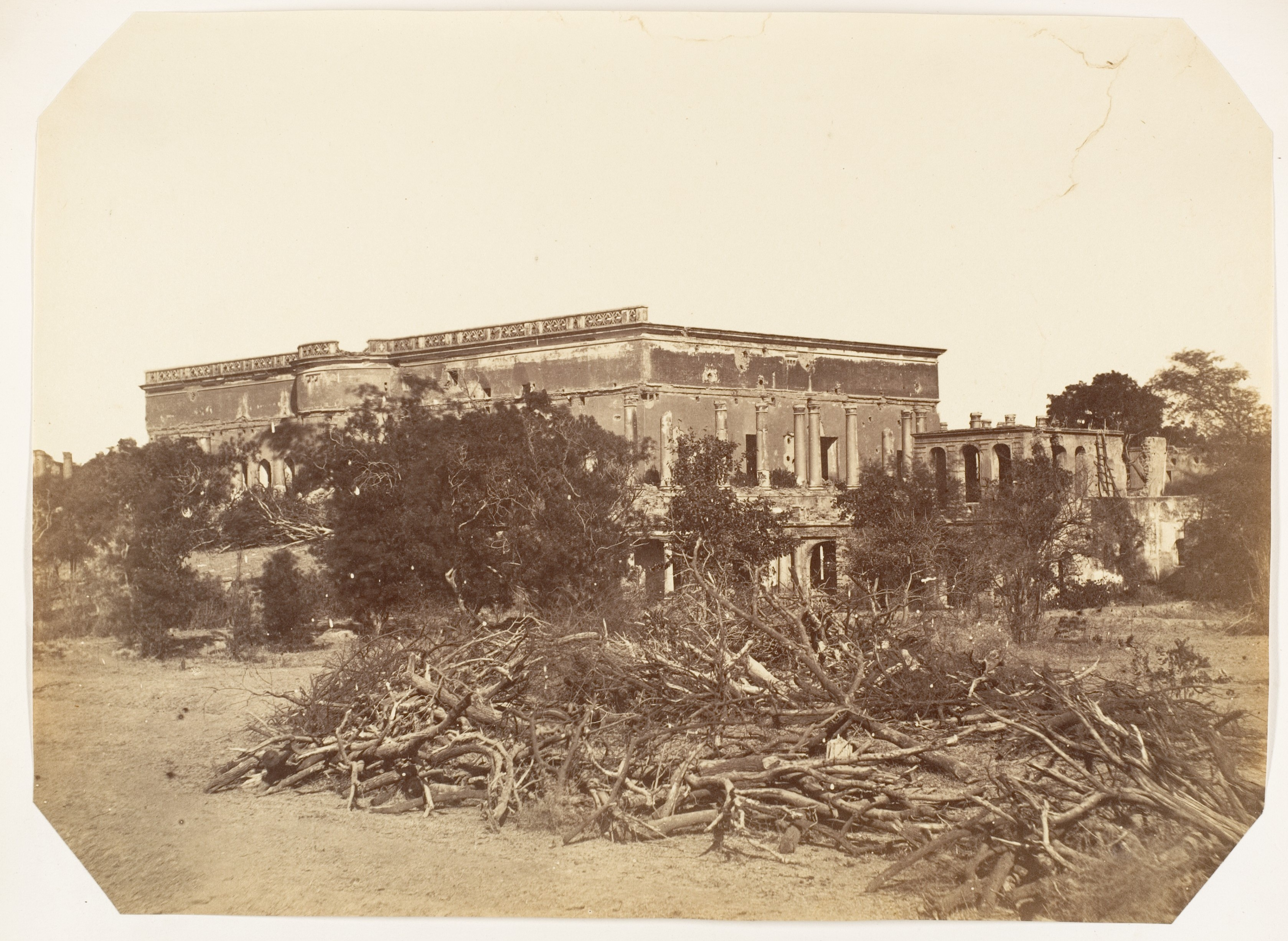
Metcalfe House, Delhi

==== Lady Canning ====
Mallitte took several photographs of Charlotte Canning, including on elephant, and on horse back.

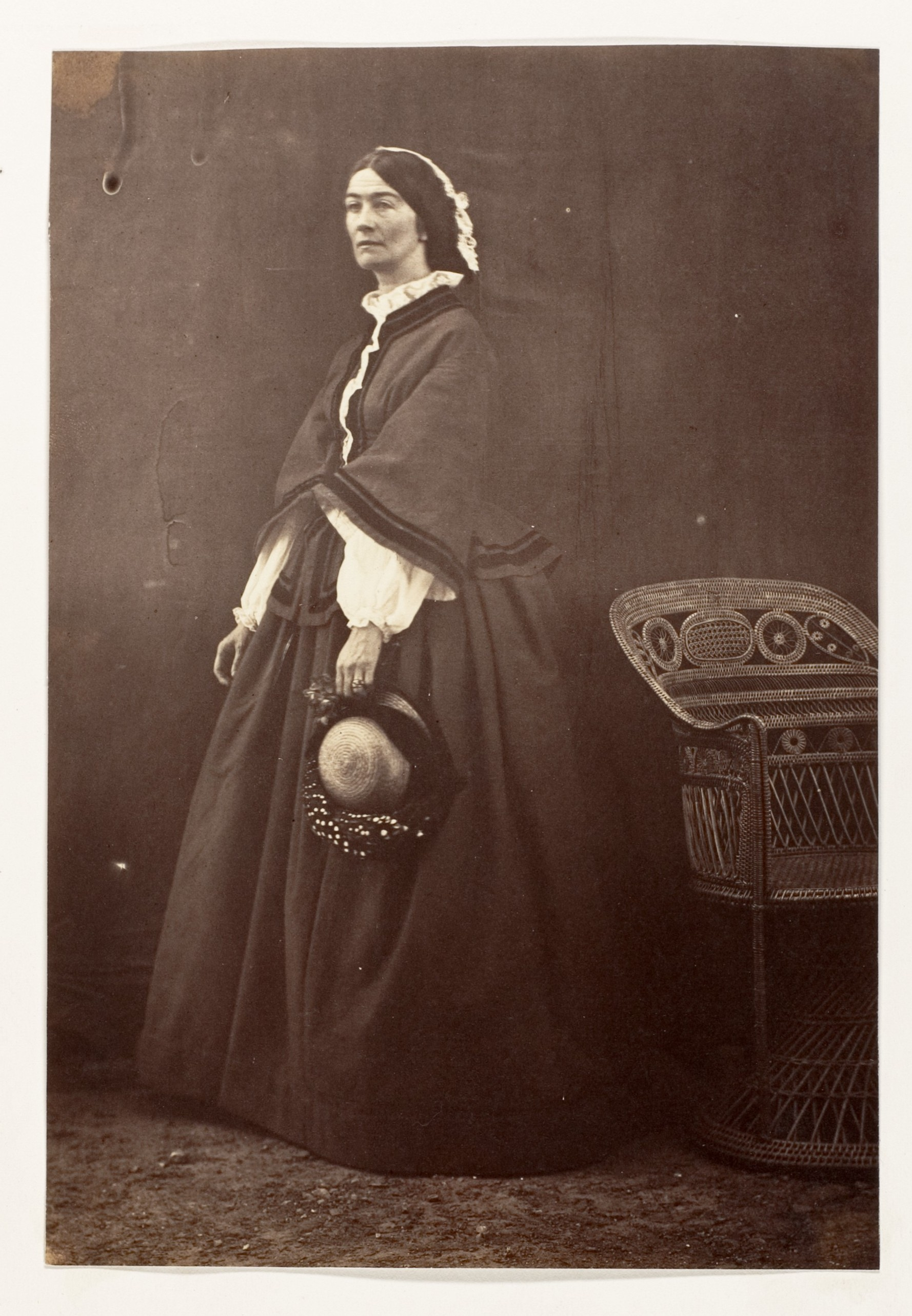
Countess Canning

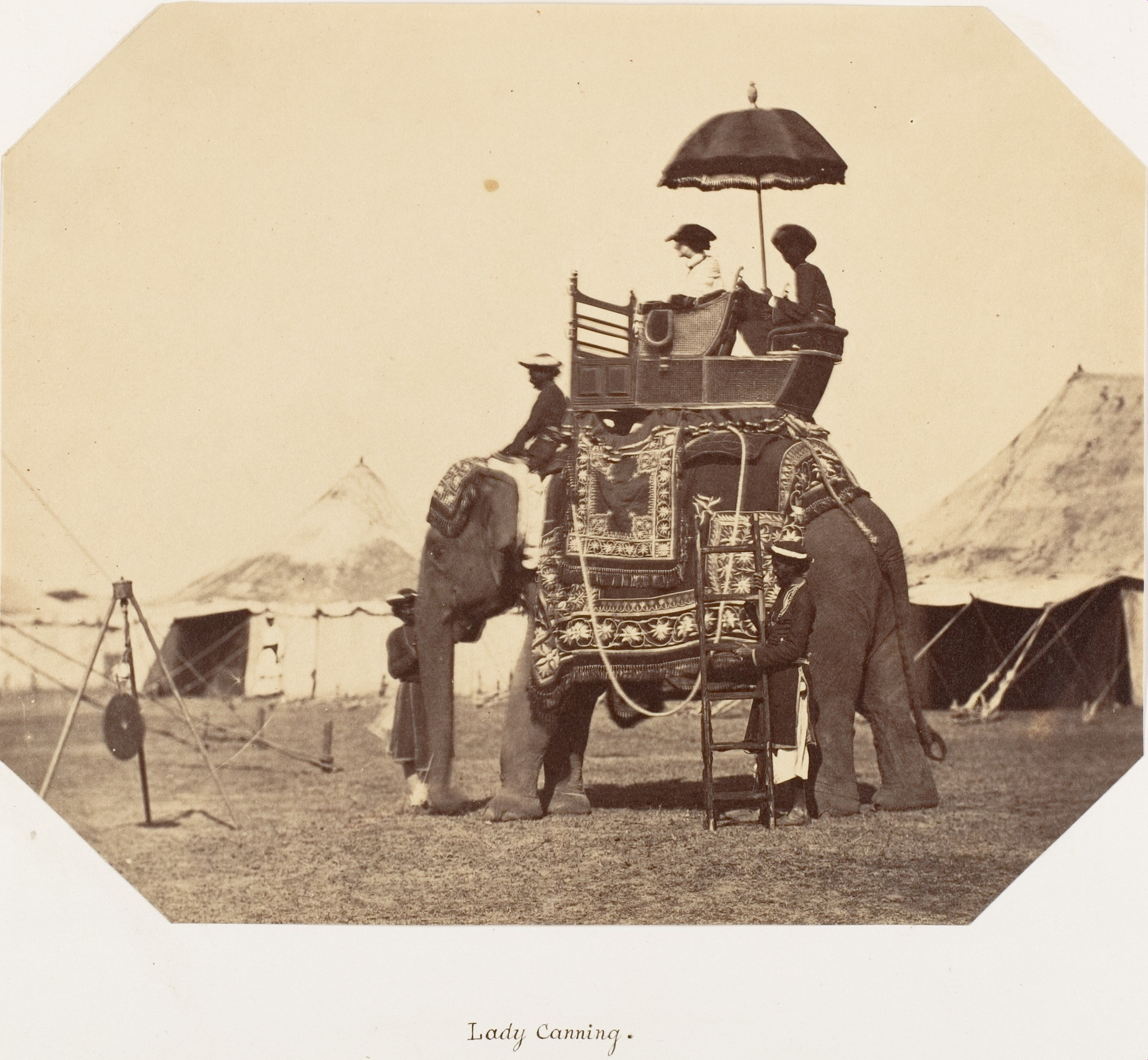
Canning on elephant

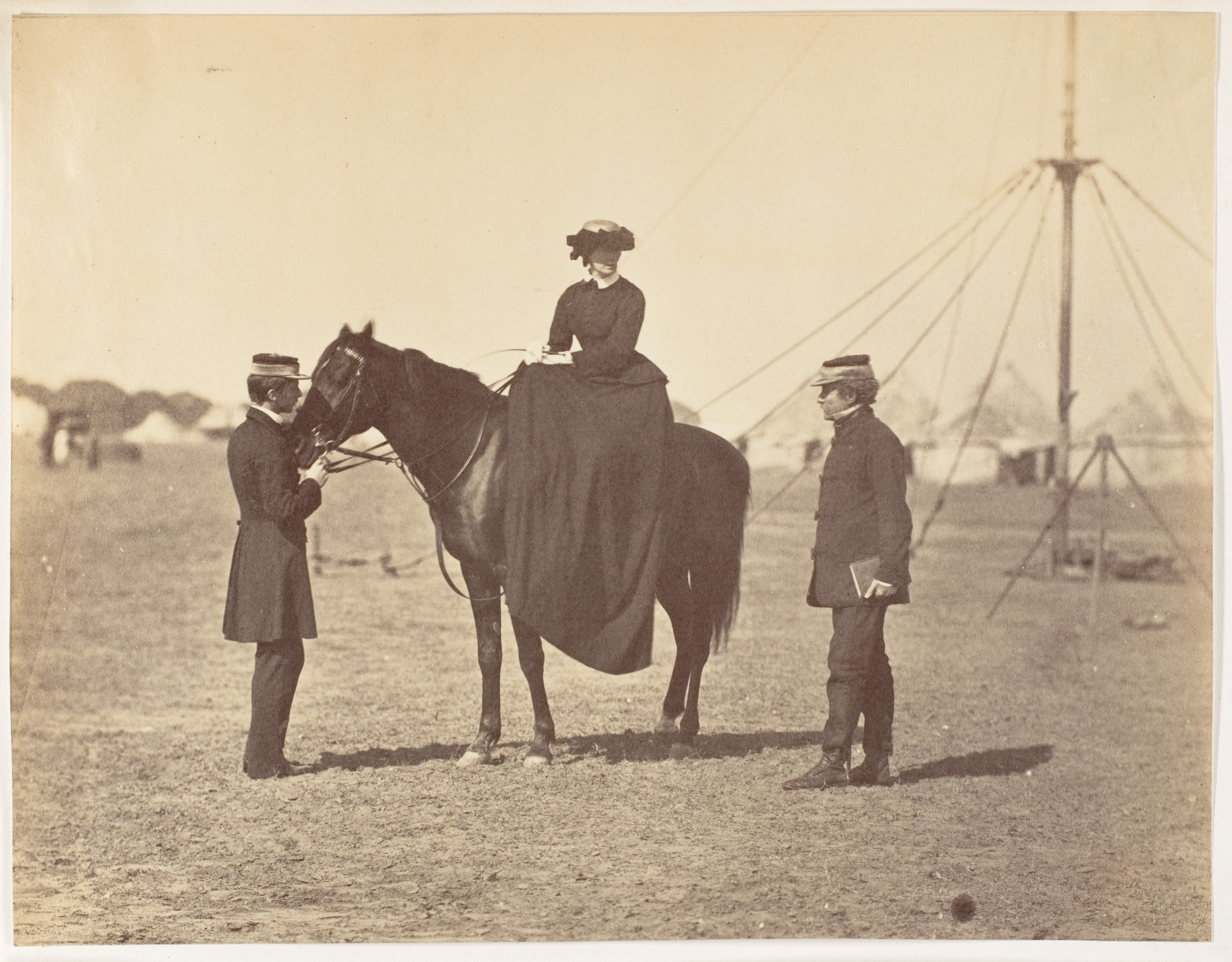
Canning on her horse

=== Indigo plantations ===
Mallitte was commissioned by the Planter's Association to take photographs of indigo plantations, for the purpose of depicting the industry in favourable light. The images were published in 1877 in The Planting & Manufacture of Indigo in India. 29 photographic views.

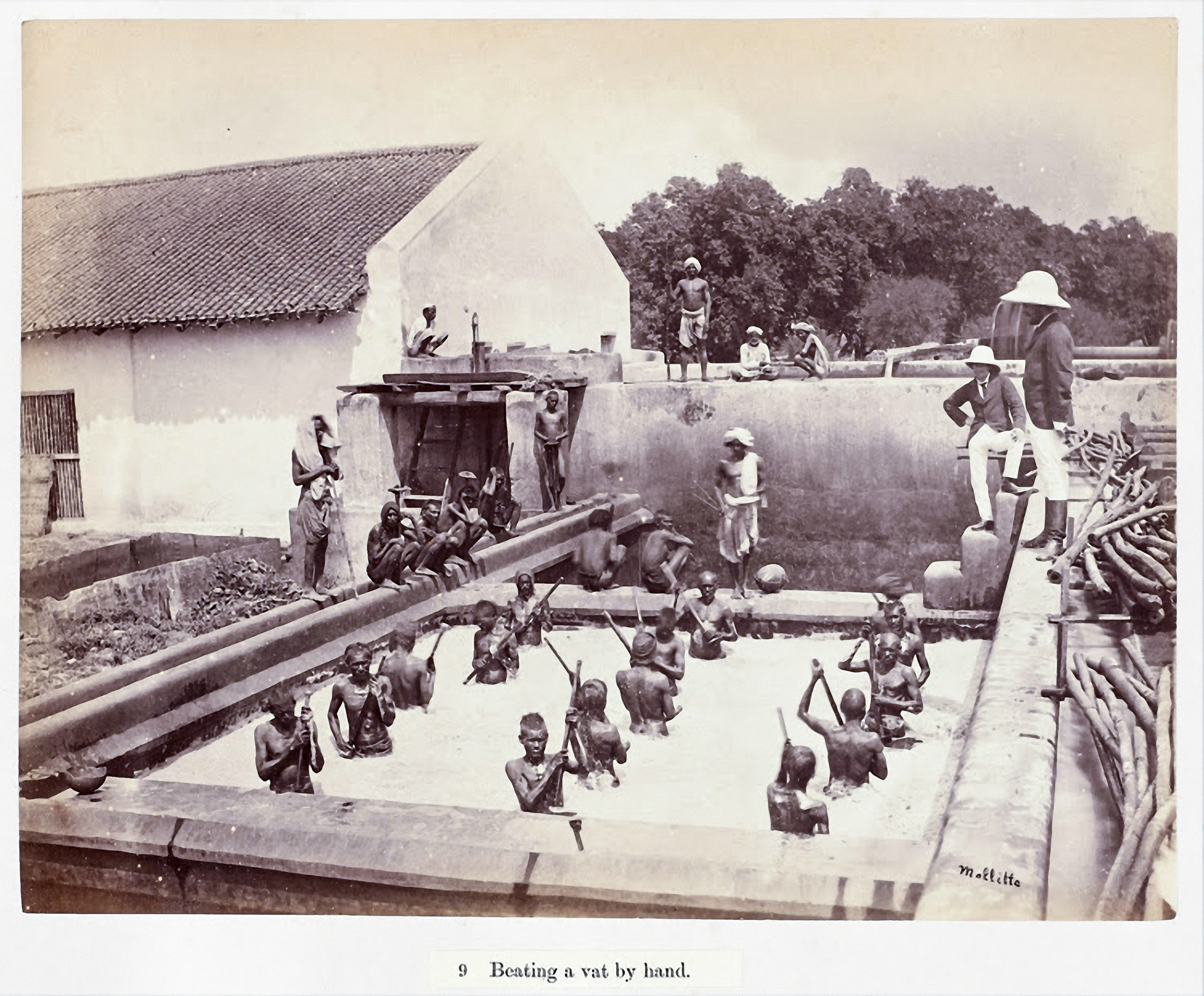
Beating a vat

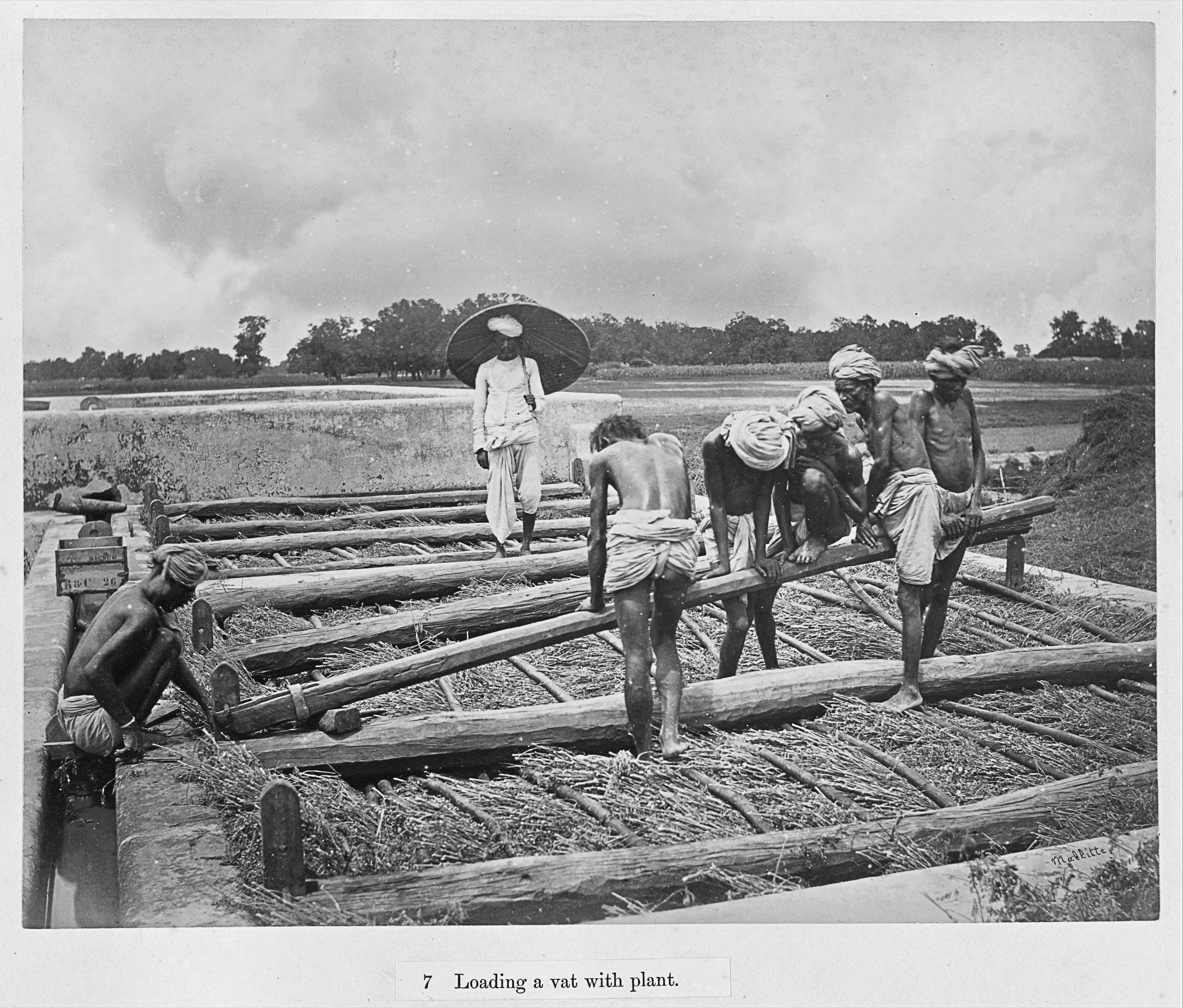
Indigo plantation

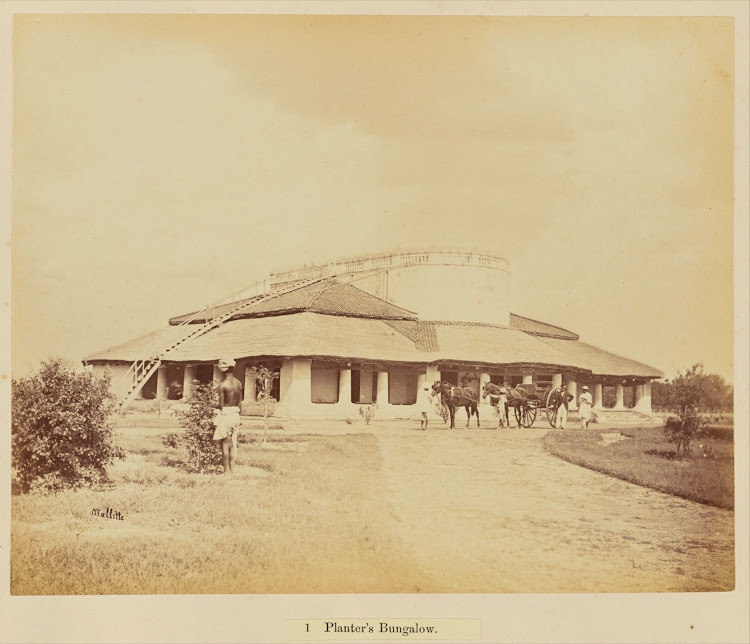
Plantar's residence

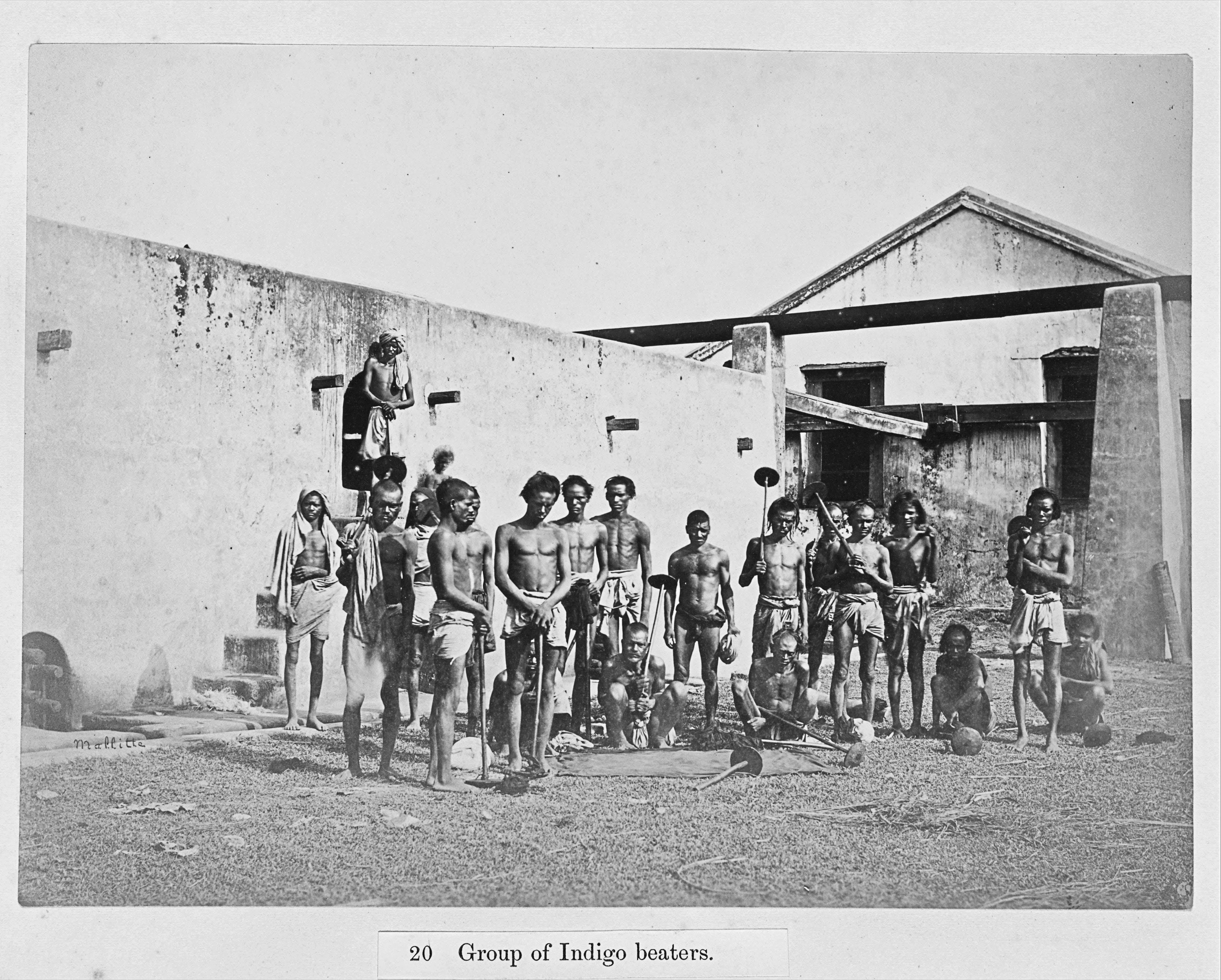
Indigo beaters

=== Second Opium War ===
Mallitte also captured photographs of the Second Opium War.

== Death ==
Mallitte died on 13 June 1905, at his home in Calcutta.
