= Kurzban =

Kurzban is a surname. Notable people with the surname include:

- Ira J. Kurzban (born 1949), American civil rights and immigration lawyer
- Robert Kurzban (born 1969), American writer and psychologist

== See also ==
- Kurban (disambiguation)
