= John Murray (photographer) =

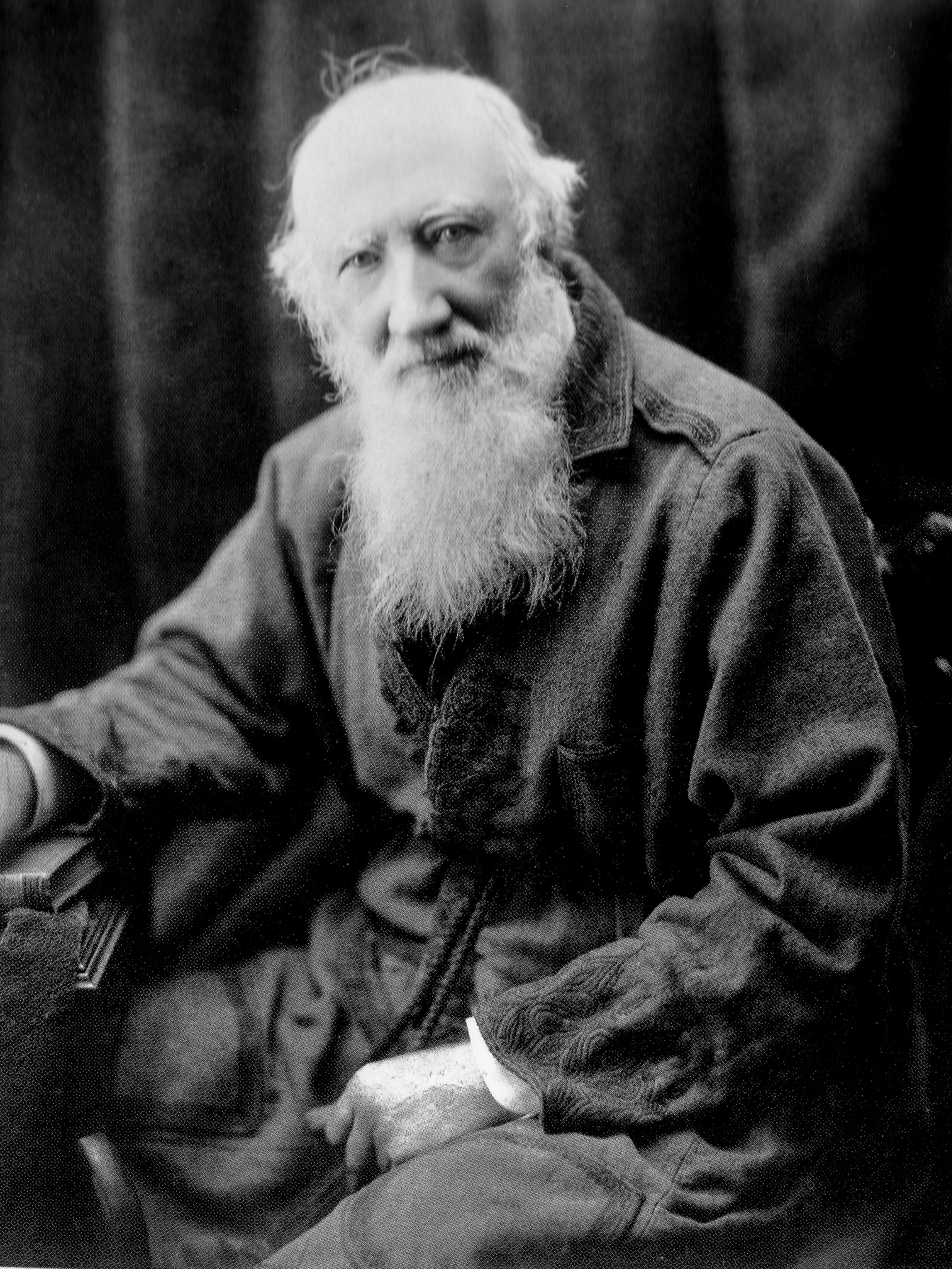
- John Murray (London, 1880)
- Born: 1809; Aberdeen
- Died: 1898 (aged 88–89); Norfolk
- Education: Marischal College; Edinburgh University
- Years active: 1833-1871 (British India)
- Known for: First principal of the Medical College at Agra; Photography of Agra, Lucknow, Kanpur
- Medical career
- Profession: Physician
- Research: Cholera

John Murray (1809 - 27 July 1898) was a Scottish physician, surgeon, a former Civil Surgeon of Agra, India, past president of the Epidemiological Society of London, and photographer, best known for his research on cholera and images of sites associated with the Indian Rebellion of 1857.

Two collections of Murray's photographs were issued as Photographic Views in Agra (1858) and Picturesque Views in the North Western Province of India (1859).

== Early life and education ==
John Murray was born in Aberdeen in 1809. Educated at Marischal College, he graduated from Edinburgh University around 1830, where his final dissertation focussed on the topic of urinary tract stones. After passing the Royal College of Surgeons he travelled to Paris to study cholera.

== Career ==
Having been appointed assistant surgeon by the East India Company, Murray arrived at Calcutta on 14 January 1833. Before being appointed resident surgeon at Indore and then Civil Surgeon of Agra, he had served with the horse artillery for two years, ran a convalescent home in Landour, and served as field surgeon with the army of the Sutlej. For his role in the Battle of Aliwal, on the Sutlej, he was mentioned in dispatches.

After at first being civil surgeon, Murray later became the first principal of the Medical College at Agra. In 1865 hewas appointed Deputy Inspector-General of Hospitals, the colonial administration's most senior position for physicians.

In India, Murray collected considerable data on cholera outbreaks. He was responsible for arranging the transfer of troops into tents upon the outbreaks of cholera, and had advocated two storeyed cholera-barracks, later widely adopted in India under the supervision of Robert Napier. Whilst in India, Murray was infected with cholera three times. He remained in India until 1868.

After returning to London, Murray was appointed president of the Epidemiological Society of London.

== Photography ==
While stationed in Agra in the 1850s, Murray spent much of his leisure time photographing historic monuments and became skilled in the calotype process. Locations he photographed included Fatehpur Sikri, Sikandra, Mathura, Brindavan, Nainital, and Simla. During a six month furlough to England, begun shortly before the Indian Rebellion of 1857, he collaborated with the publisher Joseph Hogarth to produce Photographic Views in Agra and Its Vicinity (1858), featuring 30 images selected from around 600 negatives. The publication offered British audiences some of the earliest photographic views of India and provided visual records of places frequently featured in contemporary reports, and was accompanied by a booklet of explanative notes.

In August 1857, during Colin Campbell's preparation for the second relief of Lucknow, Murray returned to India, and remained in Calcutta until 11 January 1858. There, he took several photographs of that city. That year he was commissioned by Lord Canning to take photographs of sites associated with the Indian Rebellion. From 14 January 1858, he spent 10 days at Benares, where he watched an Indian blown from a gun. At Kanpur, he stayed for a day and took 10 photographs including Sati Chaura Ghat, General Wheeler's entrenchment, and the Bibighar site. He arrived at Agra on 5 February, to find that several of the places he had previously photographed had been damaged. On 13 February he became the first photographer to reach the mostly deserted Delhi, where he stayed for a month. There, among the more than 100 photographs included Qutb Minar, Humayun's tomb, Jama Masjid, the Ridge, and Red Fort, frequently returning to these sites to retake images in varying styles. He also visited Allahabad and Lucknow. During this time he kept detailed diaries. 25 copies of each officially reported print was ordered by Canning, though the order was cancelled after 13, due to its price, before renegotiating 10 of the remaining. The printing was accomplished by Calcutta's School of Industrial Art, under the guidance of the French photographer Oscar Mallitte.

Eight of Murray's prints were displayed by the London Photographic Society at their fifth exhibition in February 1858. A collections of Murray's photographs were also issued as Picturesque Views in the North Western Province of India (1859).

=== Photographs at Kanpur ===
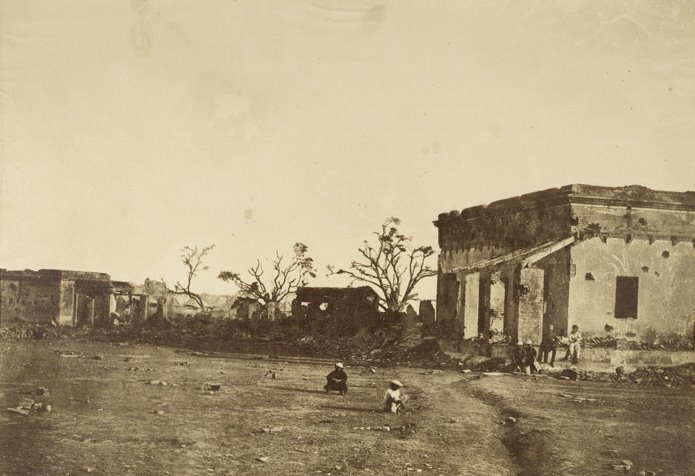
General Wheeler's entrenchment, with background displaying British troops dismantling camp before marching onto Lucknow (1858)

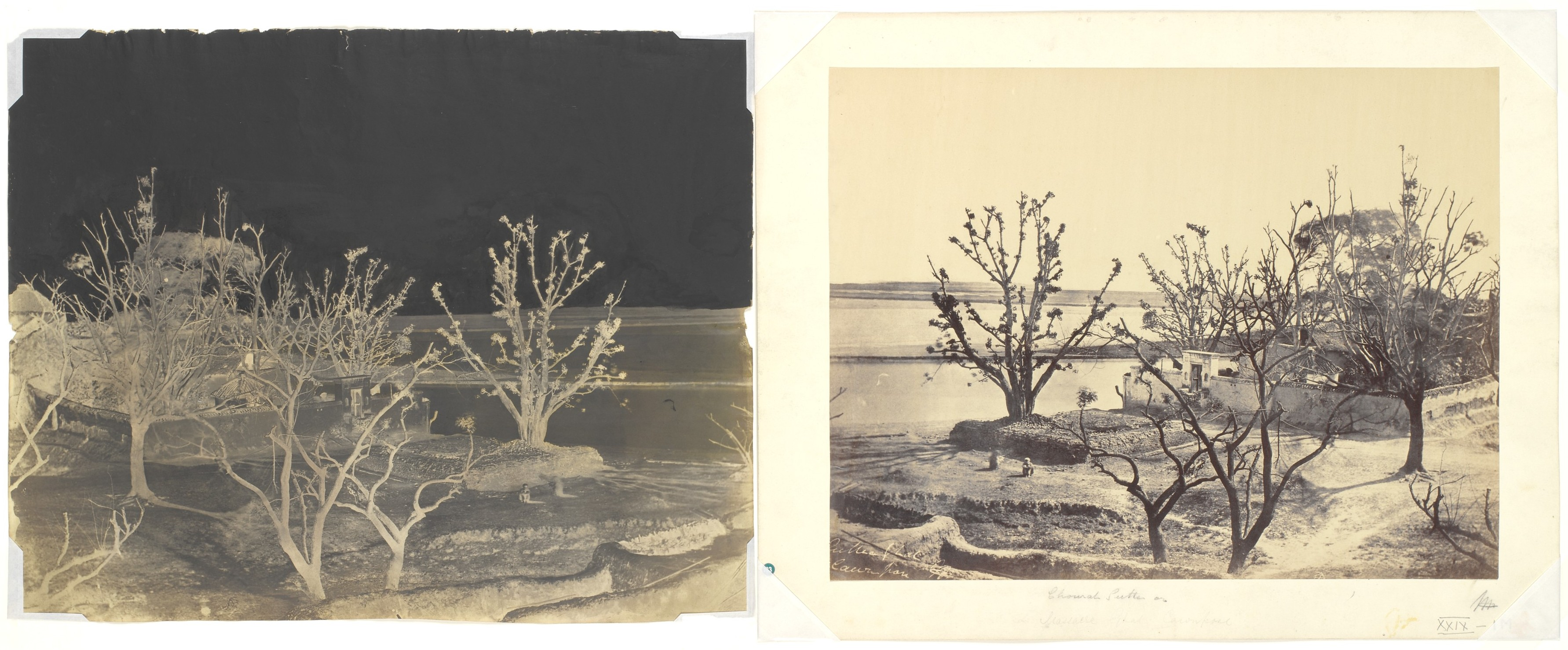
Sati Chaura Ghat (1858)

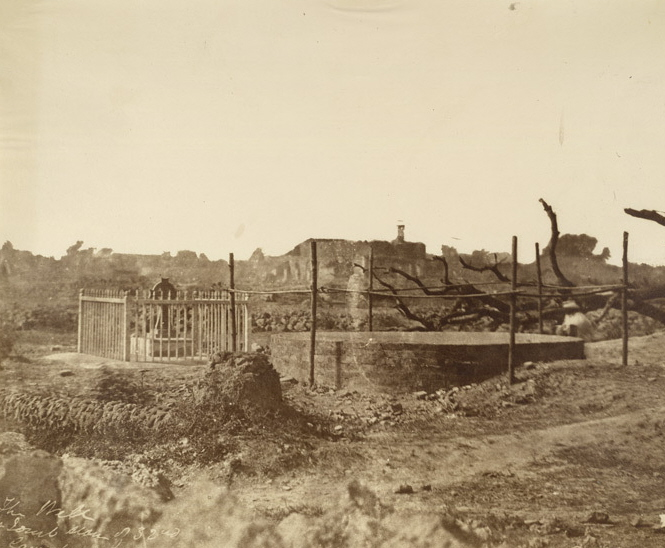
Kanpur well monument (1858)

=== Photographs at Delhi ===
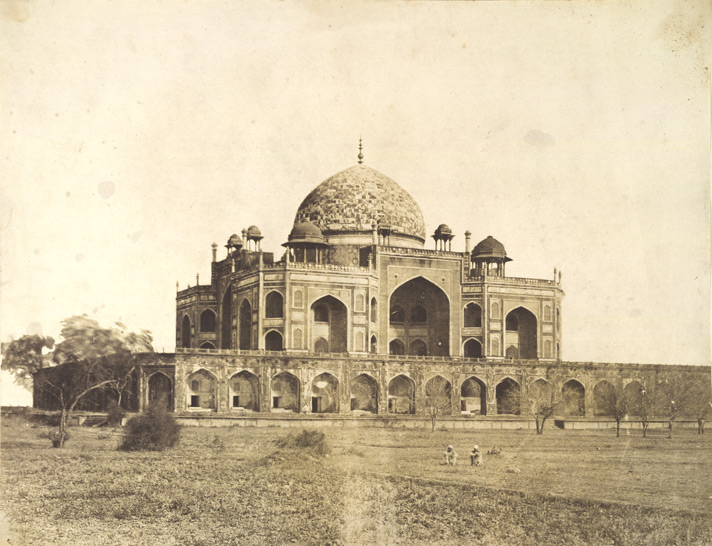
Humayun's tomb

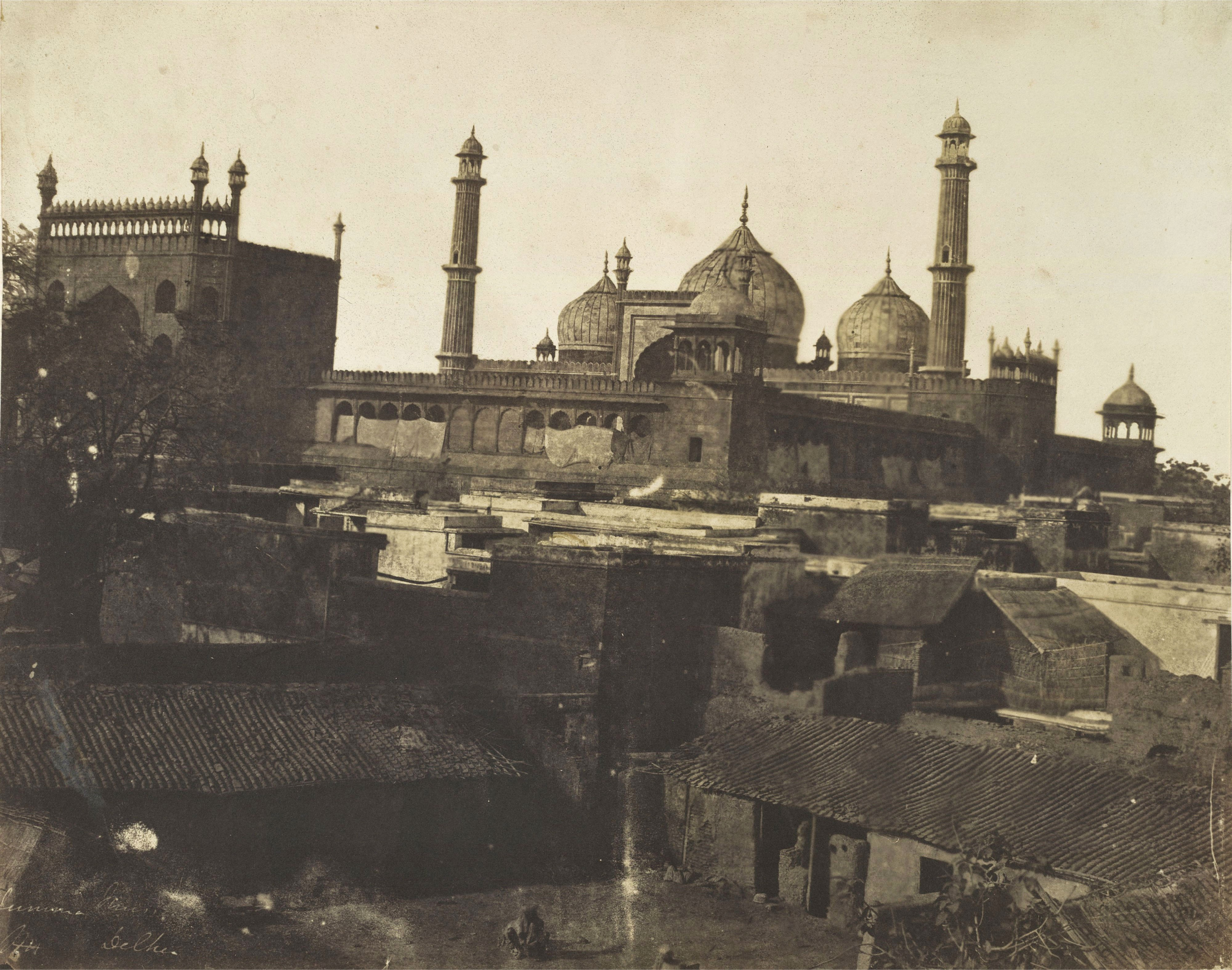
Jama Masjid

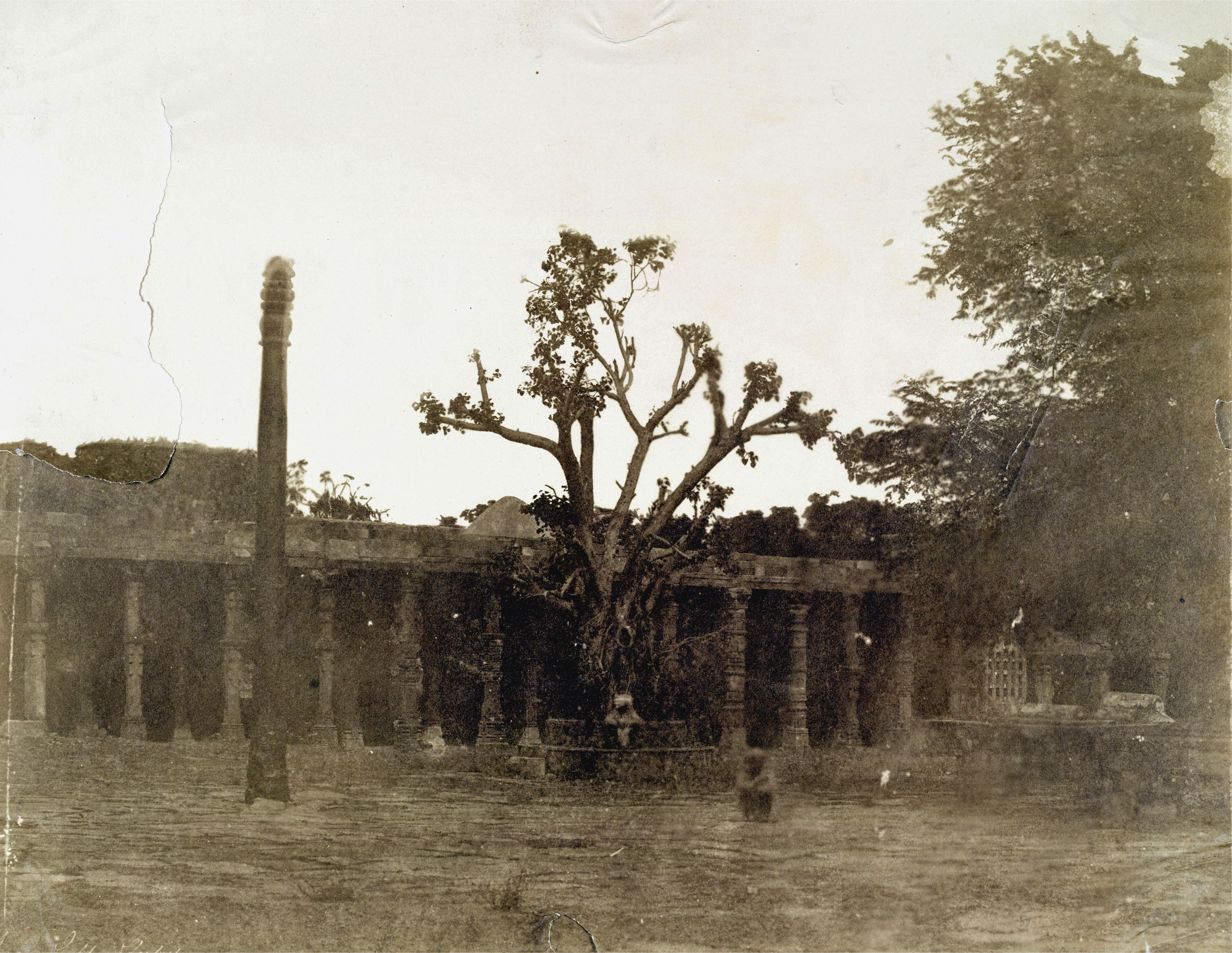
Qutb Minar complex

== Death ==
Murray died on 27 July 1898 at his home in Sheringham, Norfolk.

== Selected publications ==
=== Books ===
- Observations on the Pathology and Treatment of Cholera, the Result of Forty Years' Experience. London: Smith, Elder & Co. 1874.

=== Articles ===
- "Report on the Hurdwar Cholera of 1867". Edinburgh Medical Journal. 14 (4): 303–311. October 1868. ISSN 0367-1038. PMID 29639603.
- "On the Channels through which Cholera is Communicable". British Medical Journal. 2 (660): 216–220. 23 August 1873. doi:10.1136/bmj.2.660.216. ISSN 0007-1447. PMC 2294404. PMID 20747185.
