= Kurbaan =

Kurbaan may refer to:

- Kurbaan (1991 film), an Indian film
- Kurbaan (2009 film), an Indian film

== See also ==
- Kurban (disambiguation)
- Qurbani (disambiguation)
