= Qurbani =

Qurbani may refer to:

- Qurbani (film), a 1980 Bollywood film
- Qurban, an animal sacrifice

== See also ==
- Kurban (disambiguation)
- Kurbaan (disambiguation)
