= Colesworthey Grant =

English artist, writer and animal-rights activist in India

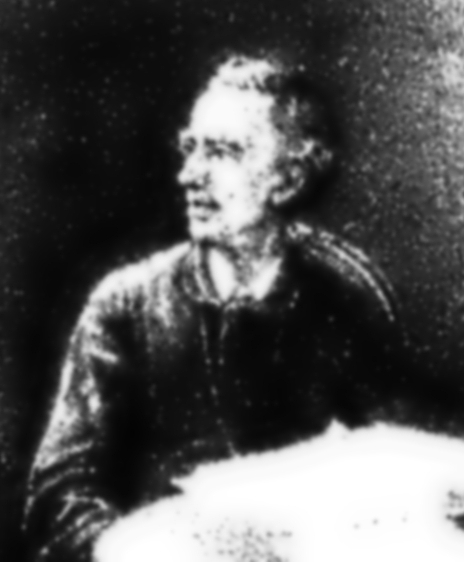
Portrait from the frontispiece of the biography by Peary Chand Mitra (1881)

Colesworthey Grant (sometimes spelt Colesworthy; 25 October 1813 – 31 May 1880) was an English artist, writer and pioneer activist against cruelty to animals in India. Teaching himself art and sketching, he produced numerous portraits of many early East India Company servants of influence in Calcutta which were published in the local periodicals of the time. He later became a professor of drawing. He founded the "Calcutta Society for the Prevention of Cruelty to Animals" in 1861 after seeing the sorry conditions especially of draught animals on the streets of Calcutta.

== Biography ==
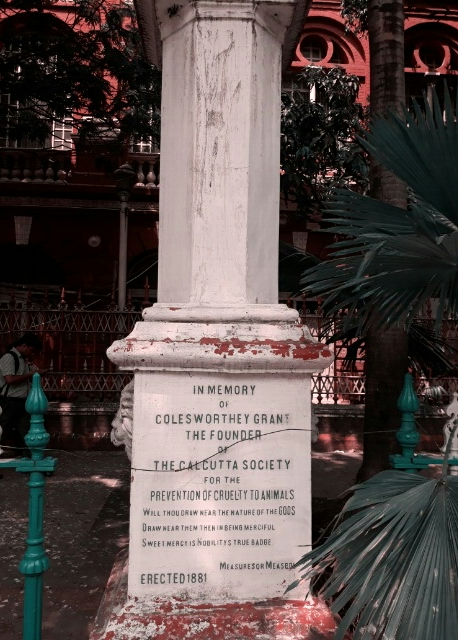
Memorial obelisk in Calcutta. The watering trough at the base and the lantern holders are now missing.

Grant was born in London to a Scottish father who manufactured mathematical instruments and a mother of Welsh ancestry. He arrived in India at the age of nineteen and joined his brother George who was a clock and watch-maker in Calcutta. Colesworthey was injured in the spine from a fall during one of his exercise sessions and could not walk straight after that. He took an interest in sketching and began to contribute to the India Review from 1838 through Fred Corbyn and later to the Calcutta Monthly Journal. These early works included portrait sketches of many eminent persons who lived in Calcutta. He later became a professor of drawing at Presidency College. Grant also illustrated Frederic J. Mouat's Atlas of Anatomy.

Colesworthey Grant was chosen by Lord Dalhousie to accompany the Ava mission to Amarapura in 1855 along with Arthur Phayre. Paid 500 rupees a month, he was to document the places for the report and was also instructed to attempt the use of photography. The use of photography however was finally done by Linnaeus Tripe who also joined the mission.

Grant was moved by the injuries and mutilations he saw to street animals, particularly draught cattle and horses, inflicted mostly by their owners and keepers. The founding meeting for the Society met on 4 October 1861 and was chaired by Archdeacon Pratt. The other twenty attendees included Alexander Duff, Mouat, Major C. Herbert, and several others including an Armenian (later the first non-European sheriff of Calcutta for 1866) Seth Arratoon Apcar; Indians Peary Chand Mittra, S. P. Sagrande, M. Rustomjee, Rajali Pertaup Chunder Sing Bahadoor and Moulvie Abdool Lotiff. The aim of the society was to "prevent the cruel and improper treatment of animals, and the amelioration of their condition generally throughout India" by among others establishing paid European officers to enforce those who were guilty of ill-treating animals and educating the public. Lord Elgin later became a Patron of the society. Grant published a text for children on animal cruelty that was to be used in Sunday schools. One of the major causes of injury to draught animals was overloaded carts. The Municipal Commissioners of Calcutta were forced to use improved carts with a single bullock having leather collars while the Indian Carrying Company began to use four-wheeled carts that took the load out of the animals. Around 1877 two more societies were established at Madras and Bangalore. Towards the end of his life Grant received an Honorary Diploma from the Royal Society for the Prevention of Cruelty to Animals. A memorial obelisk was erected near Writers' Building in Calcutta with a watering trough at its base for animals. His position as secretary was succeeded by Peary Chand Mittra who also wrote a biography of Grant.

== Works ==
- Speede, G. T. Frederic S. Barlow; et al. (1840). Indian Handbook of Gardening ... With illustrations ... To which is added, an Hindoostanee and English Vocabulary of horticultural and agricultural terms. Calcutta. (Illustrator)
- Rough Pencillings of a Rough Trip to Rangoon in 1846. Creative Media Partners, LLC. 1853. ISBN 9781297904301.
- Rural Life in Bengal: Illustrative of Anglo-Indian Suburban Life : More Particularly in Connection with the Planter and Peasantry, the Varied Produce of the Soil and Seasons; with Copious Details of the Culture and Manufacture of Indigo: Letters from an Artist in India to His Sisters in England. W. Thacker & Company. 1860.
- Anglo-Indian Domestic Life: A Letter from an Artist in India to His Mother in England. Subarnarekha. 1862.
- Portrait sketches of the public characters of Calcutta, published in the "India Review", "India Medical"... from 1838 to 1850. s.n. 1863.
- To the children of Calcutta. On cruelty, by the hon. secretary, Calcutta society for the prevention of cruelty to animals. 1872.

== Gallery ==
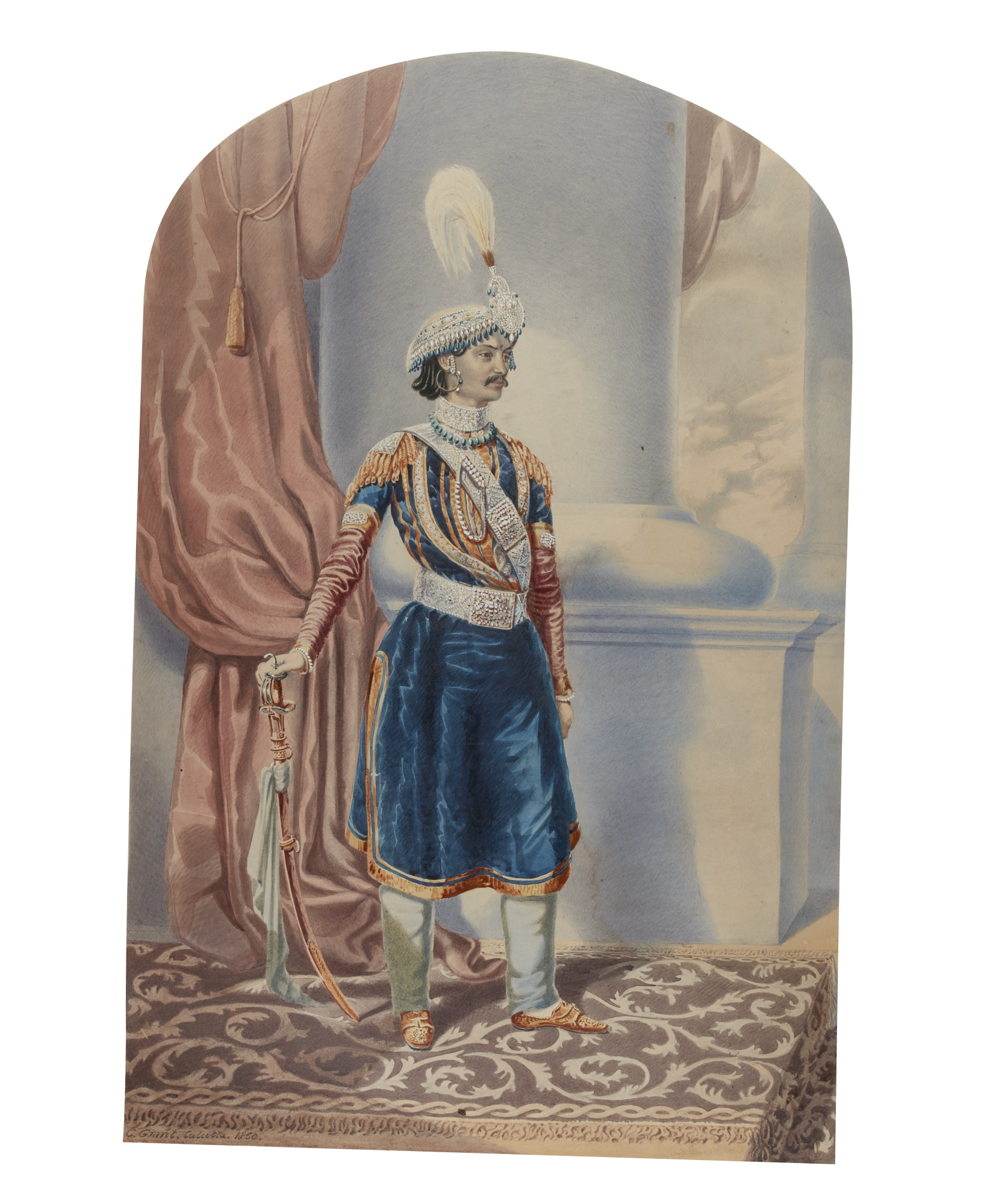
A portrait of the future Maharaja Jung Bahadur Rana of Nepal, 1850

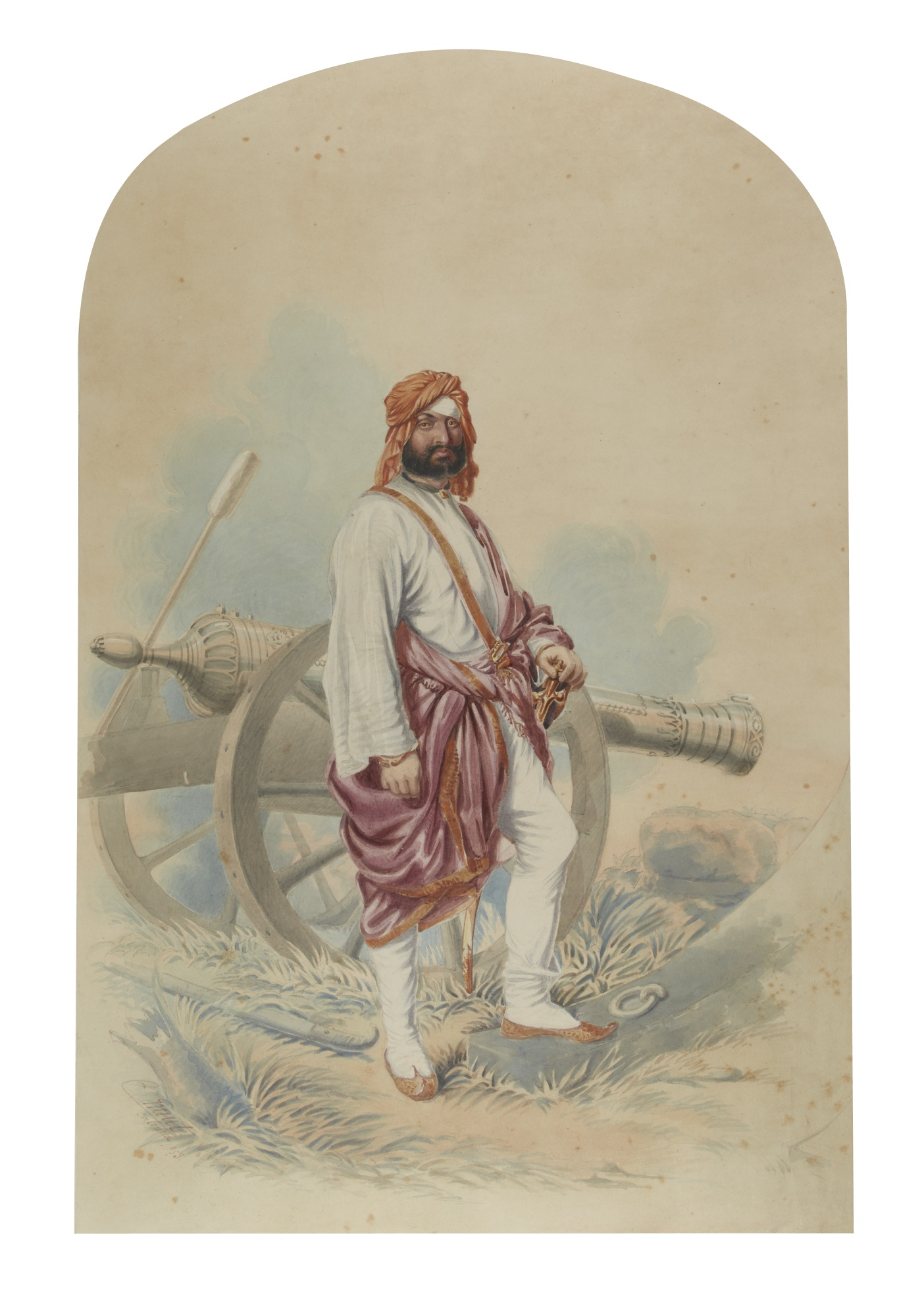
A portrait of Sher Singh Attariwalla, 1850

A portrait of Mir Nasir Khan Talpur of Sind, 1851

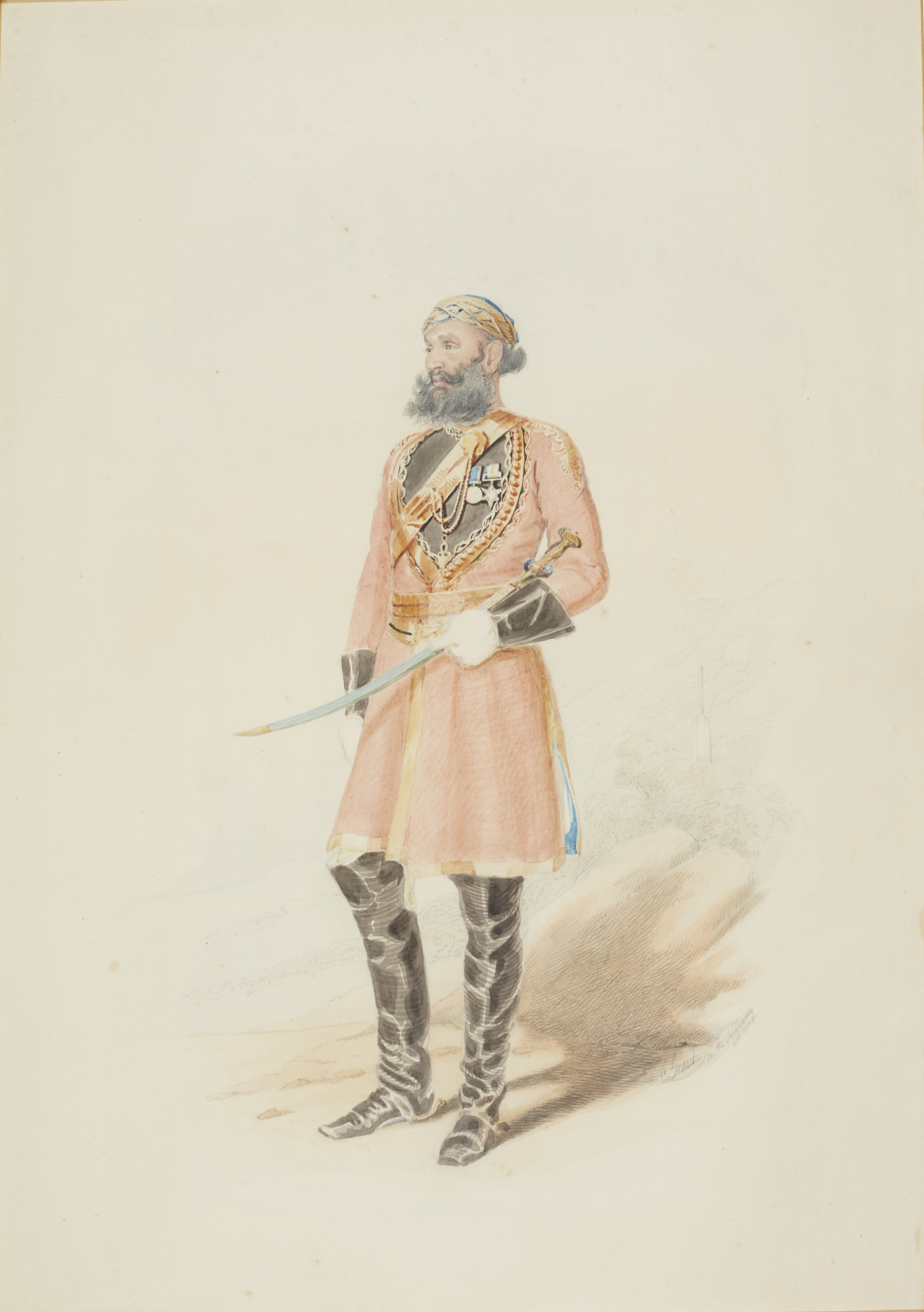
A jemadar of the 8th Bengal Irregular Cavalry, 1855

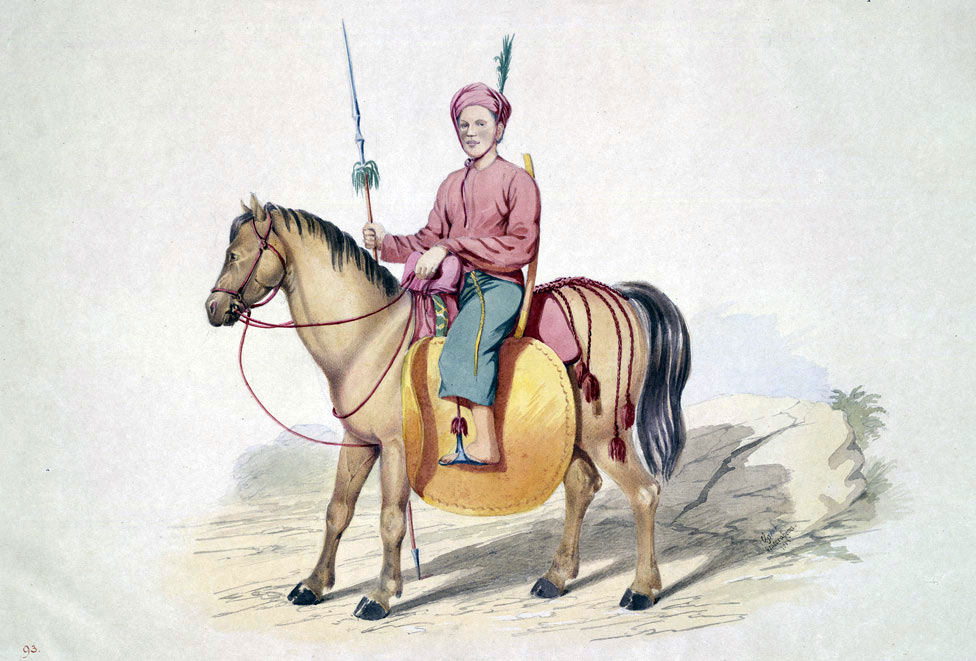
A watercolour of a Manipuri cavalryman in Burma, 1855

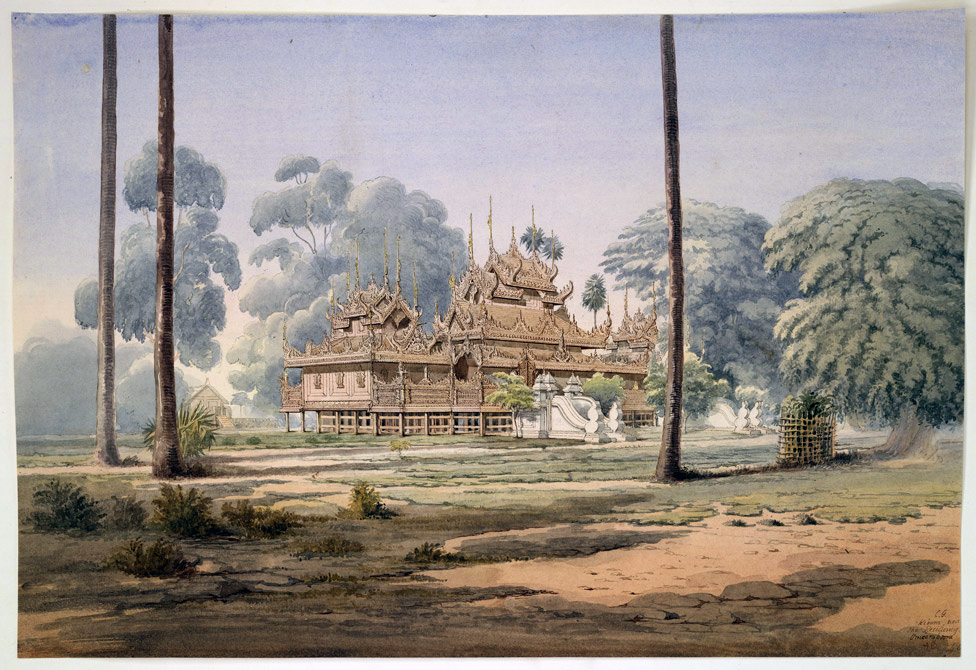
Watercolour with pen and ink of a kyaung (Buddhist monastery) at Amarapura, Burma, 1855

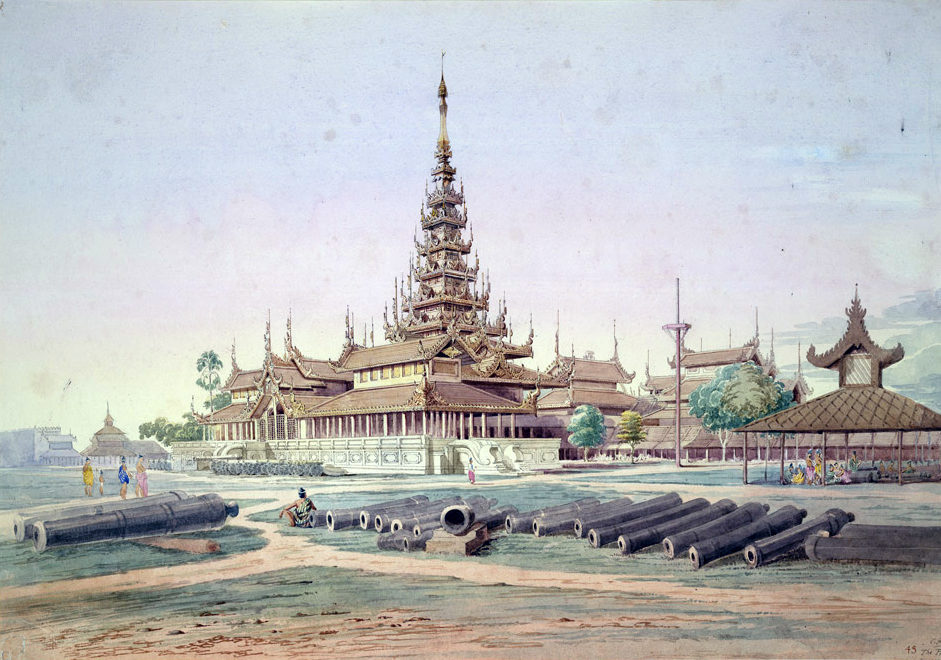
A watercolour of the king's palace in Amarapura, Burma, 1855
