= Frederic J. Mouat =

British physician, and civil servant in India

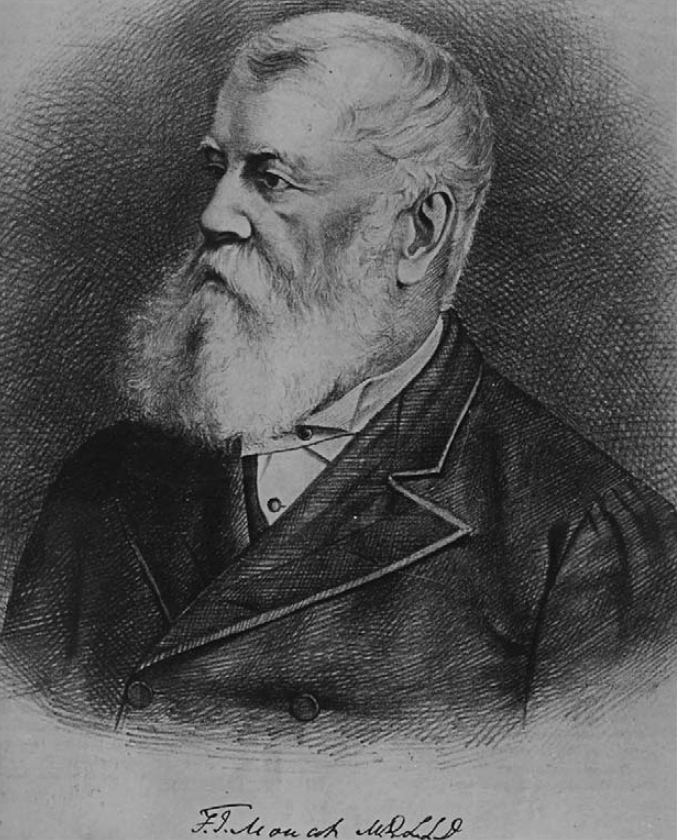
- A portrait made in 1894
- Born: 18 May 1816; Maidstone, Kent
- Died: 12 January 1897 (aged 80); Kensington, London
- Scientific career
- Fields: Medicine; Statistics

Frederic John Mouat (18 May 1816 – 12 January 1897) was a British surgeon, chemist and prison reformer. He was part of the committee that helped identify the Andaman Islands as a suitable location for a convict settlement. He examined the use of chaulmoogra oil in the treatment of leprosy and published the first illustrated book on human anatomy in Urdu in 1849. He was also involved in the founding of Presidency College, Calcutta.

== Life ==
Mouat was born in Maidstone, Kent, the son of an army surgeon, and trained at University College London and the University of Edinburgh, qualifying as a Member of the Royal College of Surgeons in 1838. His brother was Sir James Mouat. Frederic Mouat studied initially at Paris and then joined his brother at the University College London. He won a prize for medical jurisprudence in 1836-37 and qualified as MRCP in 1838. He received an MD from Edinburgh with a thesis On the brain as the organ of the mind in 1839. Mouat joined the Indian Medical Service in January 1840 and was posted Assistant-Surgeon in Bengal in June 1840. In 1853 he became Surgeon, in 1860 Surgeon-Major and ultimately Deputy Inspector-General of Hospitals. He was attached to the 21st Fusiliers at Fort William followed by stints with the 47th Bengal Native Infantry and the Artillery Battalion at Dum Dum.

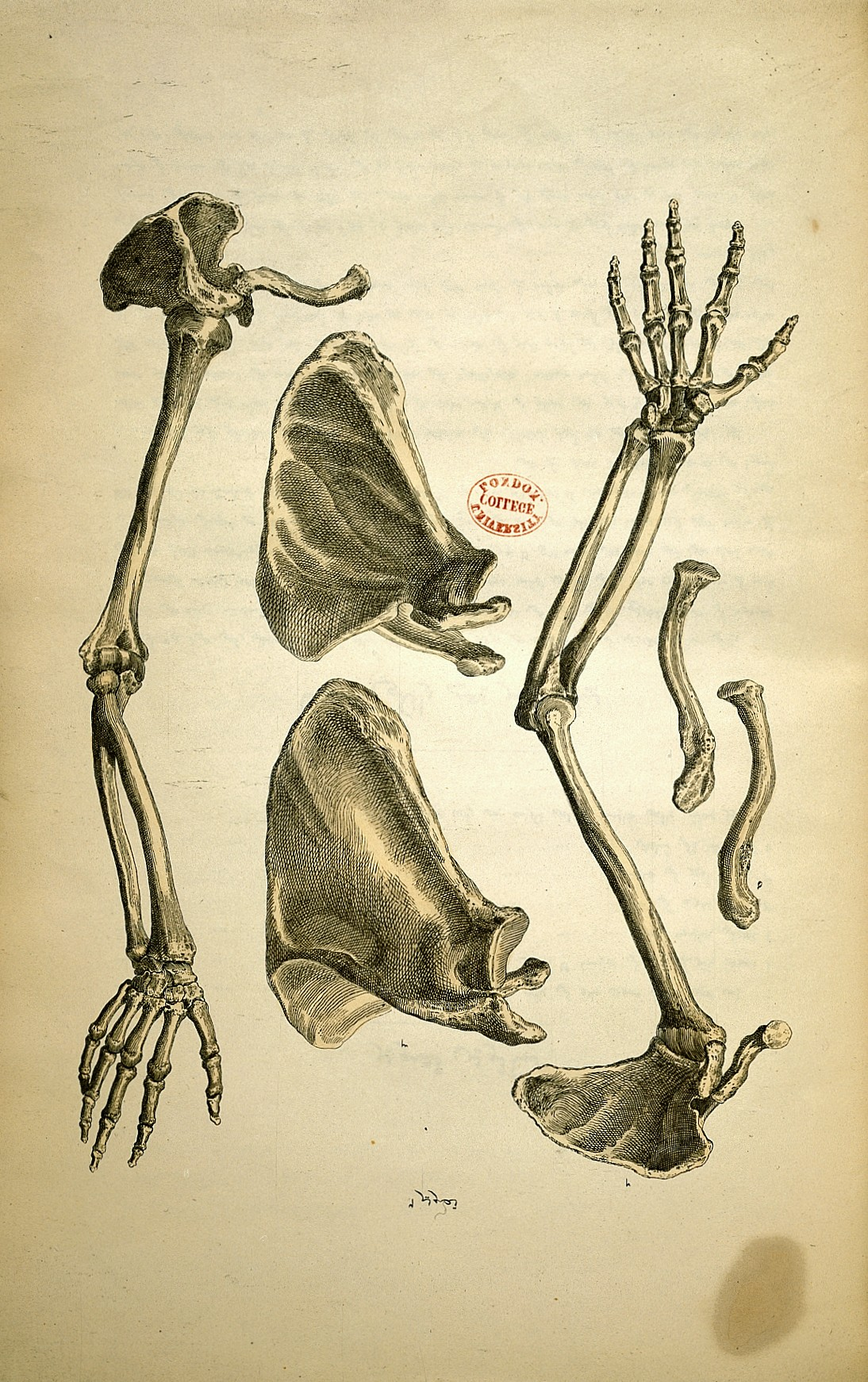
A page from Mouat's anatomy text (1849)

Mouat conducted some experiments for the Liverpool Chamber of Commerce on lichens used in dyeing and sent a report to the Earl of Auckland who was so impressed as to appoint him in 1841 as Treasurer, Secretary, Resident Medical Officer as well as Professor of Chemistry and Materia Medica at the Bengal Medical College. He supported the deputation of four medical students including Bhola Nath Bose and Surya Kumar Goodeeve Chuckerbutty in 1844 for studies in England. Among the experiments he conducted were trials on treating leprosy patients with the extracts of chaulmoogra (Hydnocarpus wightiana). In 1849, he published an atlas of human anatomy with notes in Urdu with the assistance of Moonshee Nusseerudin Ahmed and with illustrations by Colesworthey Grant. the only works upon European medicine extant... are ... chiefly in the Nagree character which is only understood by Hindu native doctors.

Mouat spent 30 years in India, where he was a leading figure in the field of education, in which he was a major campaigner to establish the first universities in India especially one in Calcutta was not acted upon until after 1857. His proposal made along with Charles Hay Cameron and Professor Malden for establishing a university in Calcutta along the lines of the one in London was examined in 1853 and shelved by the House of Lords. He also worked on prison reform while holding the post of Inspector-General of jails in lower Bengal. Here he advocated remunerative prison labour as a means for reformation and making prisons self-supporting. In 1857, after the Indian Mutiny, he was asked to investigate the Andaman Islands as a potential penal colony. The exploration began from November 1857 to January 1858 and led to the establishment of Port Blair. A bay in the Andamans was authorised by Lord Canning to be called as Port Mouat. They also took an Andaman islander "John Andaman" to Calcutta with the aim of ethnological studies and to help in improving relations with the Andaman natives. Mouat subsequently published a book about his Andaman experiences: Adventures and researches among the Andaman islanders (1863). In 1864 he wrote a Bengal Jail Code and was even working on a Prison Act but gave it up as "it was not required of me I neither completed nor submitted the work."

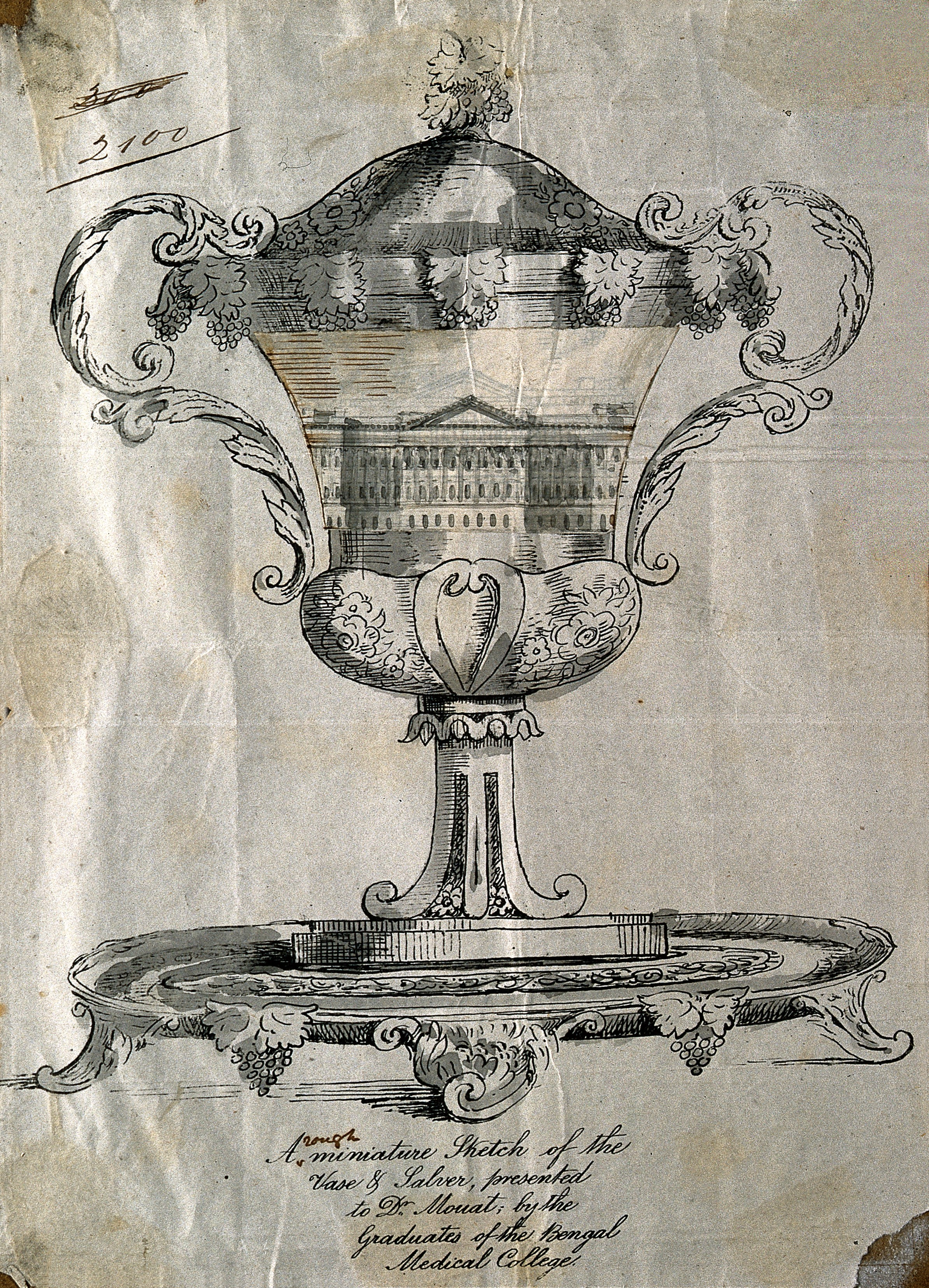
A vase presented to Mouat by the graduates of the Bengal Medical College in 1854

As a chemical examiner (part time and unpaid until the position was taken up by William O'Shaughnessy) he served on a Select Artillery Committee and helped develop, along with Colonel Edward Ludlow, a waterproof glaze to protect percussion caps in the field. He also examined the composition of gutta percha and conducted experiments on field rockets. Mouat also took an interest in photography working with the Frenchman Oscar Mallitte (1829–1905) in the Andamans and serving as the first president of the Photographic Society of Bengal (1856–57). In an article in the Lancet in 1892 in response to a debate on banning opium he opposed comparison of opium to alcohol, pointing out that opium-use did not come with law and order problems.

Mouat retired to the UK in 1870 and started a new career as an Inspector for the Local Government Board. He founded the Bethune Society in Calcutta in 1851 to promote more interaction between educated Indians and the Europeans. He was also an active member of the Royal Statistical Society, joining it in 1847 on invitation from W. H. Sykes and becoming its president in 1890.

Mouat married twice, first on 15 September 1842 to Mary Rennards Boyes who died at Kensington in 1885. No children are recorded from this marriage. In June 1889 he married a widow, Margaret Kay, daughter of John Fawcus, a Justice of Peace who had four children from her earlier marriage. Mouat died on 12 January 1897 at his home in Durham Villas, Kensington from pneumonia and asthenia. He was cremated at Woking as wished by him. He left a widow and four stepchildren. A memorial bust made by Hamo Thornycraft in 1874 was bequeathed to the University College London.
