= Kurban =

Kurban is a term for animal sacrifice in:

- Islam, see qurbani
- Judaism, see korban
- the Balkans, see kourbania

It may also refer to:

== Given name ==
- Kurban Günebakan (born 1978), Turkish boxer
- Kurban Kurbanov (born 1985), freestyle wrestler from Uzbekistan
- Kurban Said, pseudonym of the author Azerbaijani–UkrainianLev Nussimbaum (1905–1942)
- Kurban Tulum (1883-1975), Uyghur treated by the Chinese Communist Party as a symbol of unity with the Uyghurs
- Naheed Kurban Nenshi (born 1972), Canadian politician

== Surname ==
- Olga Kurban (born 1987), Russian female heptathlete
- Roy Kurban, American Taekwondo martial arts grandmaster

== Other uses ==
- Kurban (band), a Turkish rock band

== See also ==
- Kurbaan (disambiguation)
- Qurbani (disambiguation)
- Corban (disambiguation)
- Korban (name)
