= Corbin (given name) =

Corbin is a masculine given name. Notable people with the name include:

- Corbin Allred (born 1979), American actor
- Corbin Bernsen (born 1954), American actor
- Corbin Bleu (born 1989), American actor, with Jamaican and Italian descent
- Corbin Burnes (born 1994), American professional baseball player
- Corbin Carroll (born 2000), Taiwanese-American professional baseball player
- Corbin Harney (1920–2007), elder and spiritual leader of the Newe (Western Shoshone) people
- Corbin Kaufusi (born 1993), American football player
- Corbin Lacina (born 1970), former American football offensive lineman
- Corbin Mthunzi (born 2007), Zimbabwean footballer
- Corbin Smidzik (born 1998), stage name Corbin (musician), American rapper, singer, songwriter and record producer
- Corbin Tomaszeski, Canadian restaurant consultant and celebrity chef
