= Corbin (automobile) =

Defunct American motor vehicle manufacturer

Corbin Motor Vehicle Corporation
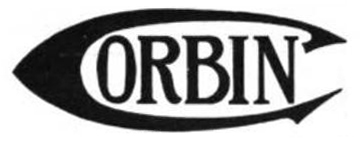
- Type: Automobile Manufacturing
- Industry: Automotive
- Founded: 1904
- Defunct: 1912
- Headquarters: New Britain, Connecticut, United States
- Area served: United States
- Products: Vehicles; Automotive parts

The Corbin was an American automobile manufactured from 1904 to 1912 in New Britain, Connecticut. Early cars were air-cooled, but the company later added water-cooling.

== History ==
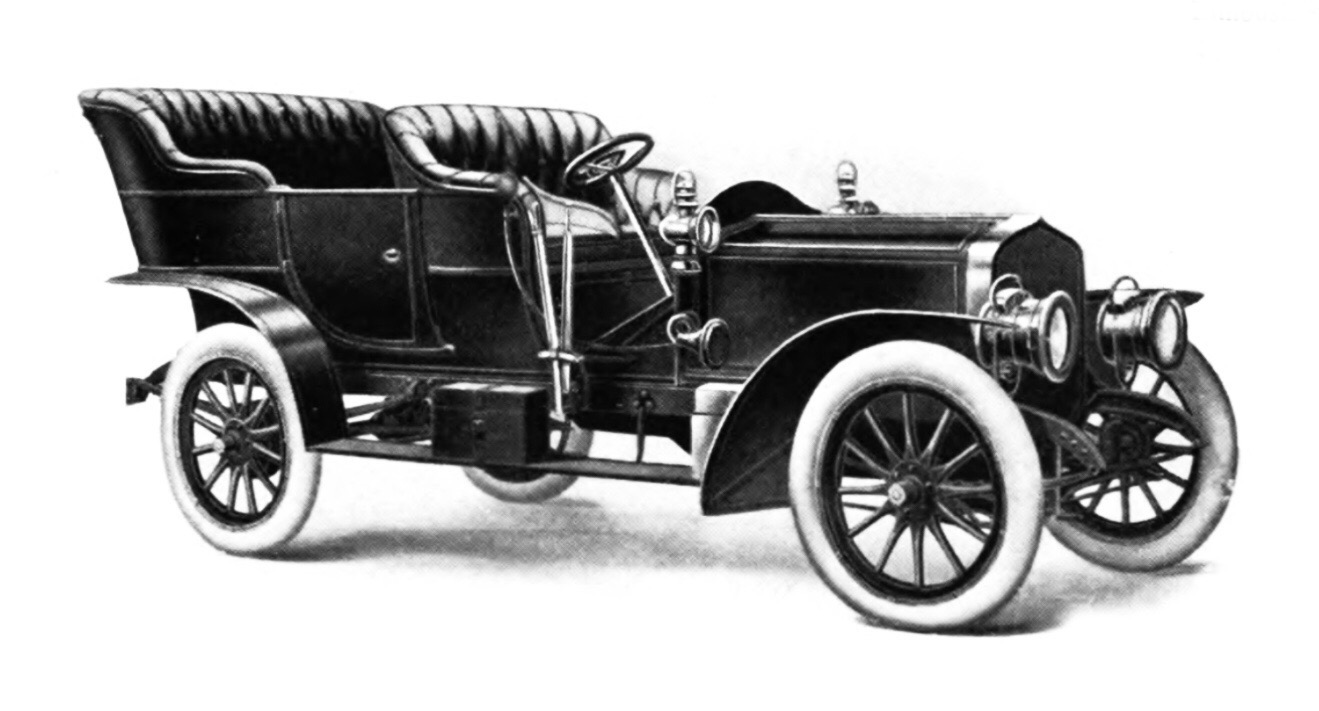
Corbin Model H (1907).

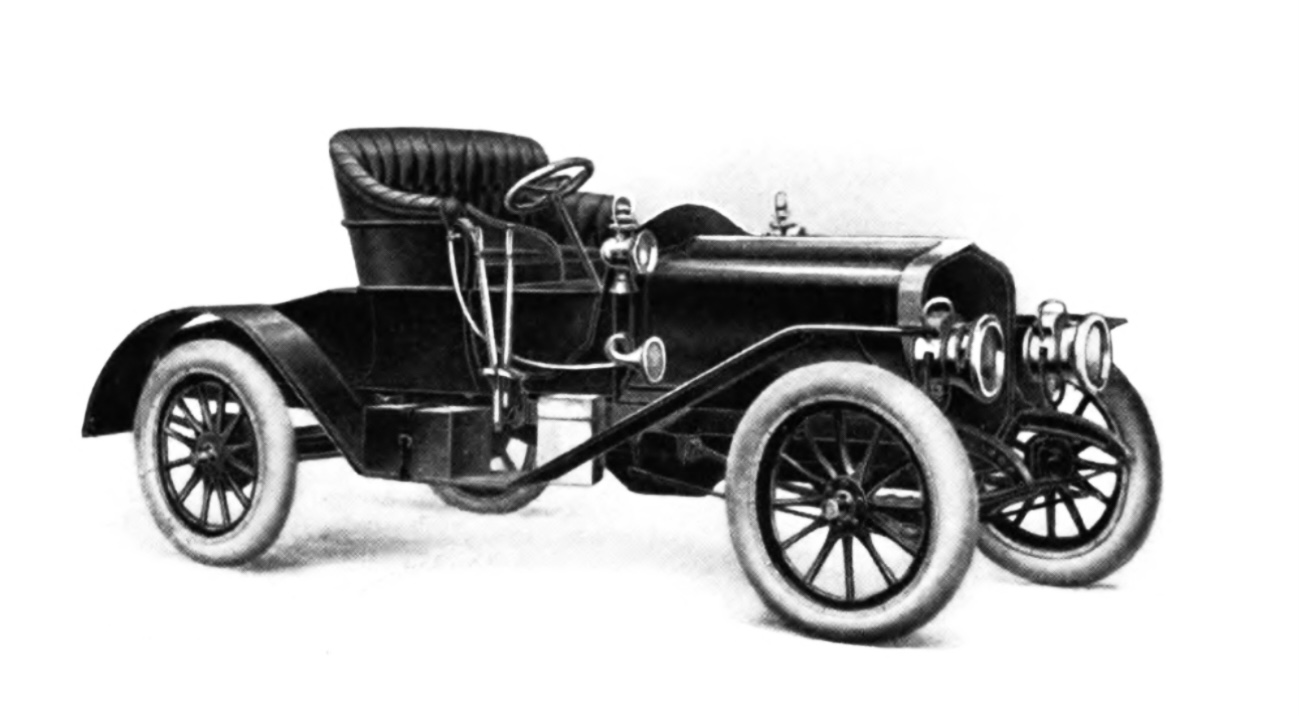
Corbin Model I (1907).

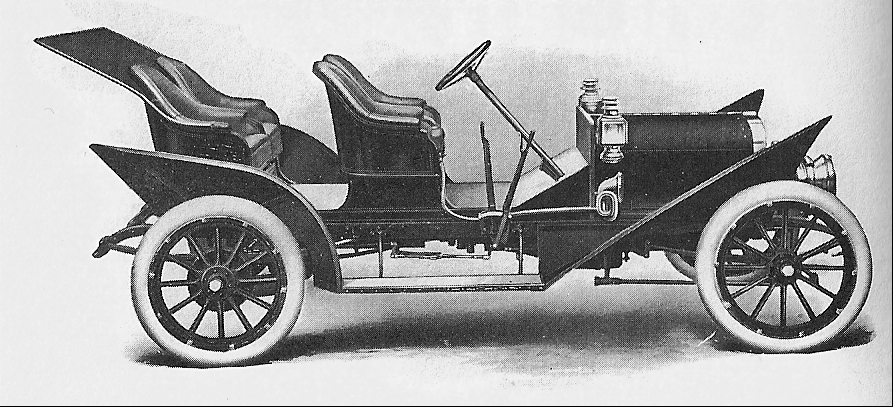
1908 Corbin

In mid 1903 the Corbin Vehicle company would be incorporated in Connecticut with a capitalization of $200,000 to manufacture automobiles. The company would operate out of New Britain Connecticut; cars would be in the Russell & Erwin Manufacturing factory which was owned by the American Hardware Corporation The president would be P Corbin; vice president Charles M. Jarvis.

During 1912, the Model 30 (for $2,000) and Model 40 (for $3,000) were on display in Madison Square Garden.

== Production models ==
- Corbin Model I
- Corbin Model H
- Corbin Model K
- Corbin Model R
- Corbin Model S
- Corbin Model O
- Corbin Model 14
- Corbin Model XVIII
- Corbin Model Forty
- Corbin Model Thirty

== See also ==
- Brass Era car
