= Corbin, Missouri =

- Former community
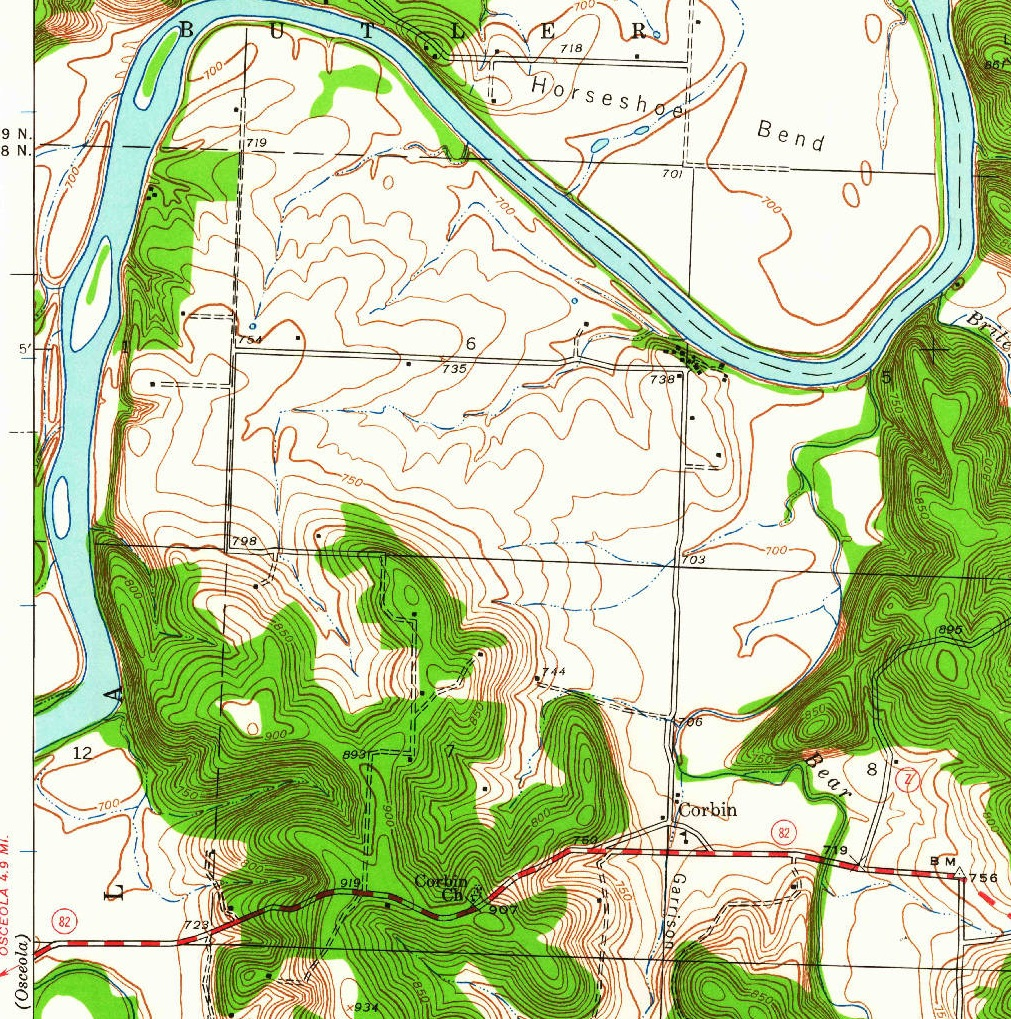
- Location of Corbin on 1940 USGS map, south of the Osage River
- Interactive map of Corbin, Missouri
- Country: United States
- State: Missouri
- County: St. Clair

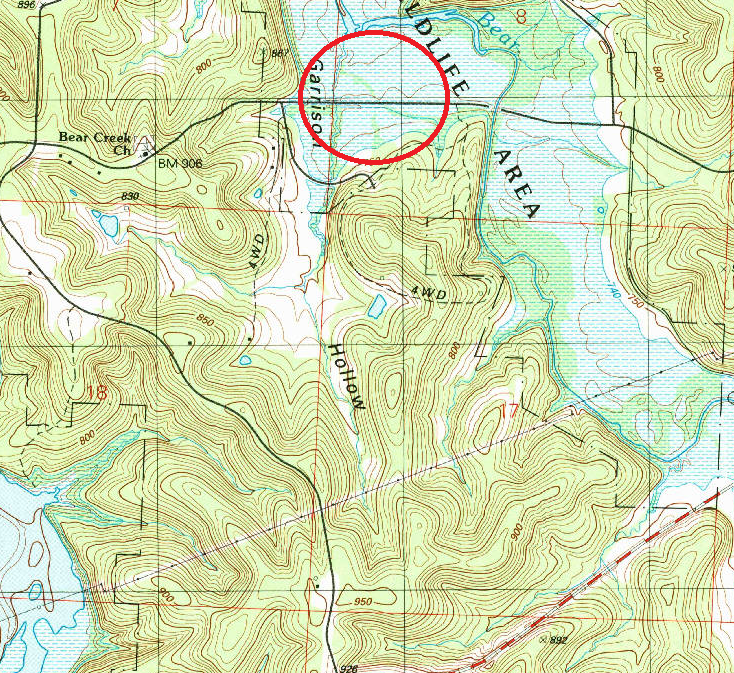
Excerpt of 1991 USGS map with red circle showing approximate former location of Corbin. Note former "Corbin Ch." location in 1940 map now labeled as "Bear Creek Ch.", and Missouri Route 82 has been realigned to the south. The former Route 82 alignment is now NE 320 Rd. through this segment. The road joins modern Route 82 to the east, and ends to the west where the now inundated and wider Weaubleau Creek lies.

Corbin is a former rural community in St. Clair County, in the U.S. state of Missouri. It was located in Section 8 of Polk Township, about seven miles east of Osceola. The community site was inundated and destroyed with the creation of the Truman Reservoir.

A post office called Corbin was established in 1901, named for Jim Corbin, and remained in operation until 1933.

The former Corbin Church laying west along former Route 82 from the Corbin post office is now Bear Creek Church, and Missouri Route 82 has been realigned to the south. The former Route 82 alignment is now NE 320 Rd. through the former location of Corbin. The road joins modern Route 82 to the east, and ends to the west where the now inundated and wider Weaubleau Creek lies in the Truman Reservoir Management Lands.
