= Corbin, Georgia =

Unincorporated community in Georgia, US

Coordinates: 34°13′12″N 84°41′44″W

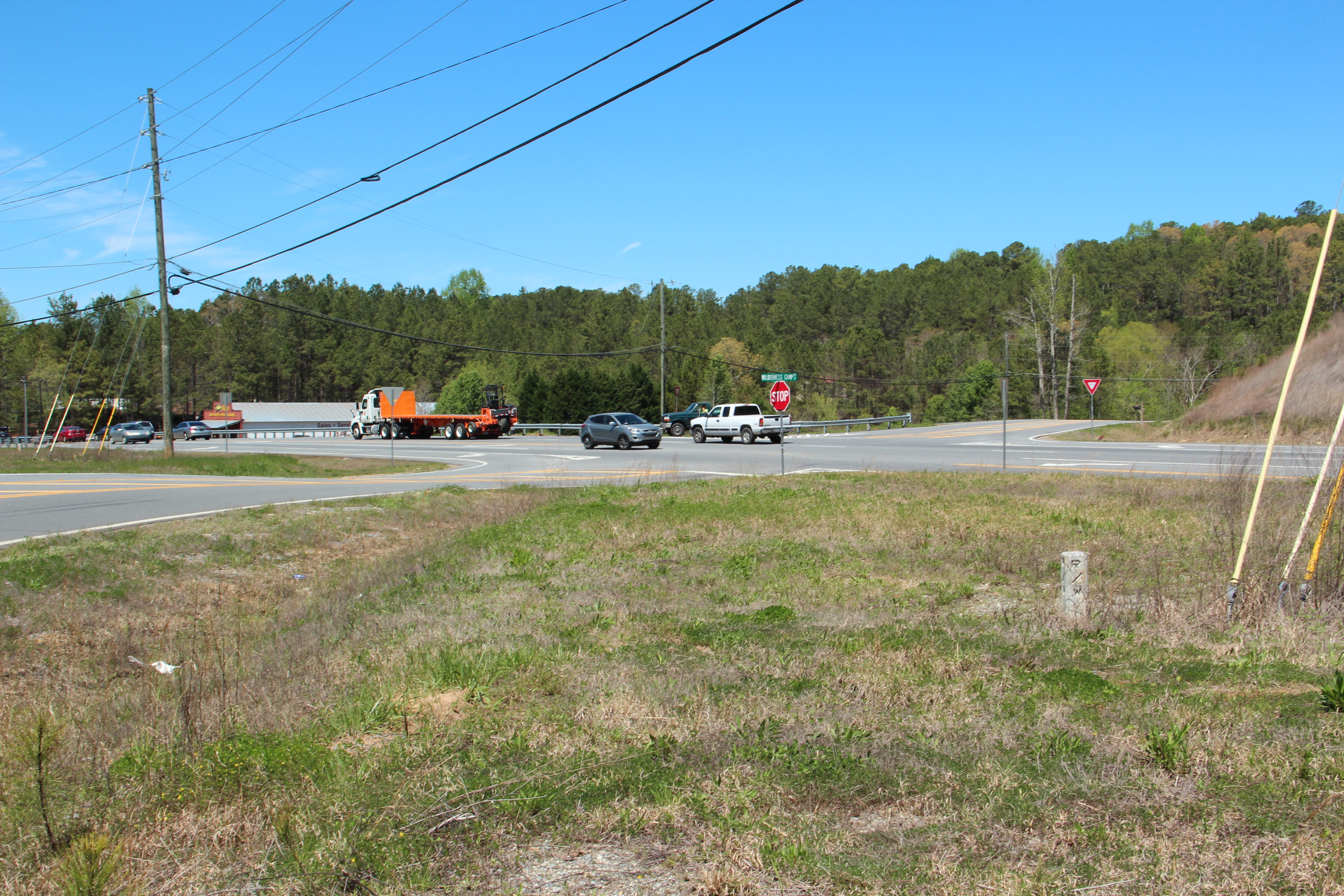
Georgia State Route 20 in Corbin

Corbin is an unincorporated community in Bartow County, in the U.S. state of Georgia.

== History ==
A post office called Corbin was established in 1887, and closed in 1902. The community was named for John Corbin, an early settler.
