= Corbyn, Stacey & Company =

Corbyn, Stacey & Company was a firm of manufacturing and retail chemists established in London in 1726. It was founded by Thomas Corbyn (1711 – 1791), who had been apprenticed to Joseph Clutton; Clutton, his wife Mary, and son Morris became partners in the business. The firm gained an extensive overseas trade in North America and the Caribbean.

George Stacey became a partner in 1772. In 1850, the company acquired the Winstanley & Company business; it was incorporated in 1898. The company once owned a warehouse, laboratory and a shop, but its building was shuttered in 1896. The company continued as wholesale suppliers until 1927.

The company's records are held in the Wellcome Collection.
