= George Ranken Playfair =

Scottish surgeon (1818–1881)

George Ranken Playfair (1818 - 1881) was a Scottish surgeon, known for being part of the Andaman Committee that surveyed the Andaman Islands in 1857 for the purpose of finding a site for a penal colony.

Playfair entered the Indian Medical Service in 1840 and served with the Royal Navy during the First Opium War, for which he was awarded a campaign medal. He subsequently joined the Bengal Medical Service, and was awarded a medal and clasp for his service during the Indian Rebellion of 1857. He later served as Deputy Inspector General of Hospitals in Bengal and from 1858 to 1868 was President of the Medical College at Agra.

In 1859 Playfair published a study of the Andaman Islands. A photographer, he accompanied Samuel Bourne on an expedition to the Himalayas in 1866 to 1867. During periods of leave, he studied in Edinburgh with Sir James Young Simpson. He retired in 1872 with the rank of Surgeon-General.
