= Corben =

Corben is a surname. A list of people with the name includes:

== People ==
- Gerard Corben, Australian guitarist
- Richard Corben (1940–2020), American comic book artist

== Fictional characters ==
- John Corben, alias Metallo, cyborg supervillain and foe of Superman
- Michael Corben, the superagent in the film If Looks Could Kill

== See also ==
- Corbin (disambiguation)
- Corbyn (name)
