= Corban of Cluana =

Irish saint

Corban of Cluana is an Irish saint who died in 732. He was the founder of the church of Kilcorban in the townland of Ballycorban, parish of Ballinakill, County Galway. His feast day was 19 July.
