= Corbin, West Virginia =

Unincorporated community in West Virginia, United States

Corbin
- Unincorporated community
- Location within the state of West Virginia Corbin (the United States)
- Coordinates: 39°18′33″N 81°20′50″W
- Country: United States
- State: West Virginia
- County: Wood
- Elevation: 991 ft (302 m)
- Time zone: UTC-5 (Eastern (EST))
  - Summer (DST): UTC-4 (EDT)
- GNIS ID: 1560361

Corbin was an unincorporated community in Wood County, West Virginia, United States.
