= Korban (name) =

Korban or Kourban may refer to the following people

Given name

- Korban Best (born 2003), American Paralympic sprinter
- Korban Blake, British multi-genre author

Surname

- Gennady Korban (born 1949), Russian Greco-Roman wrestler
- Hennadiy Korban (born 1970), Ukrainian businessman and art collector
- Kristina Korban, Ukrainian-American performer, model and movie producer
- Yelena Korban (born 1961), Soviet sprinter
