= Frederick Corbyn =

Garrison Surgeon in Calcutta

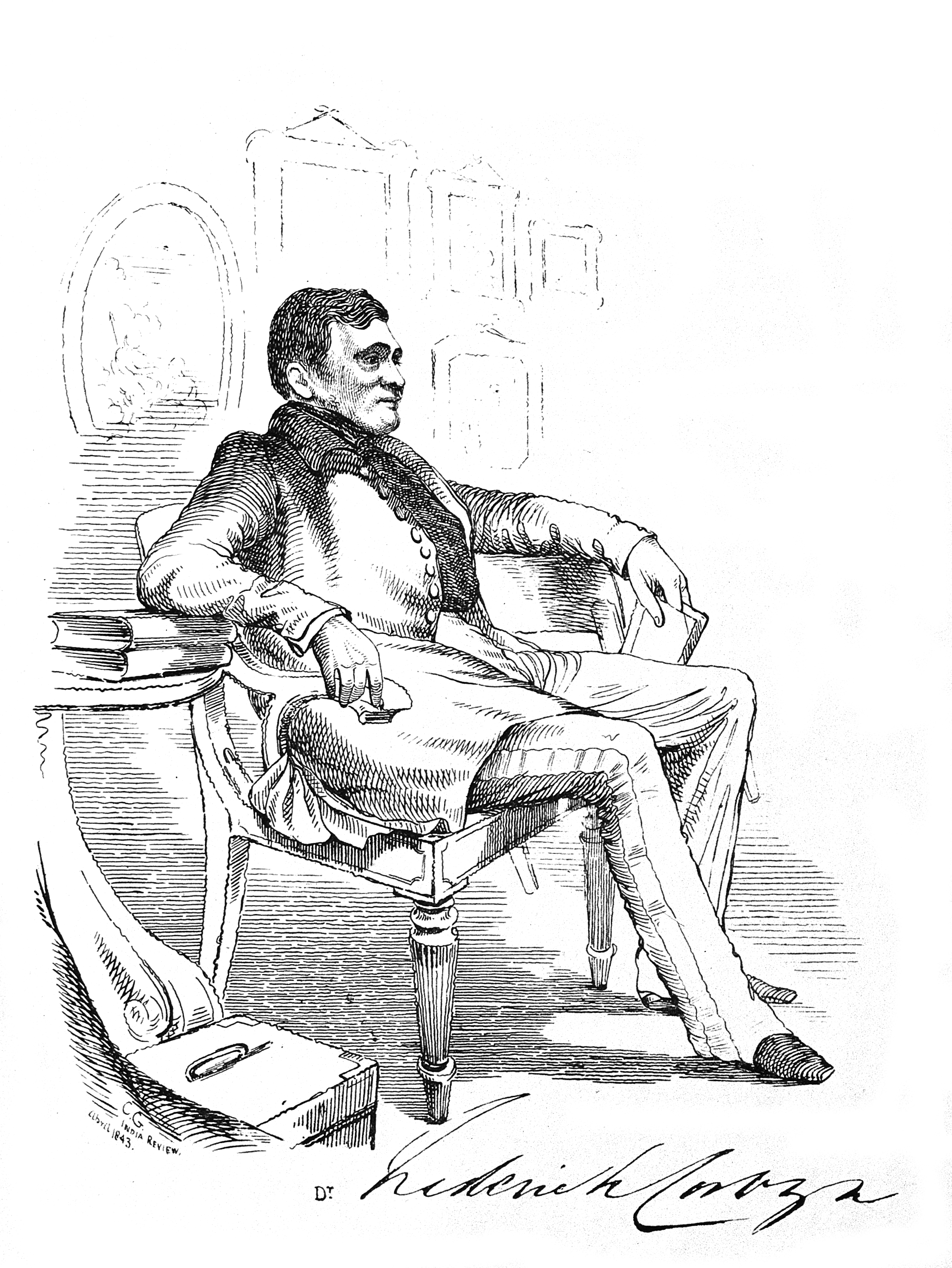
Portrait by Colesworthey Grant

Frederick Corbyn (11 May 1791 – 7 October 1853) was an English surgeon who worked in Calcutta and was the founder of one of the first scientific journals published from India The India Review of Works on Science, and Journal of Foreign Sciences and the Arts; embracing Mineralogy, Geology, Natural History, Physics &c. (1836-1842). He also edited the India Journal of Medical and Physical Science (1836–42), a medical journal begun in 1834.

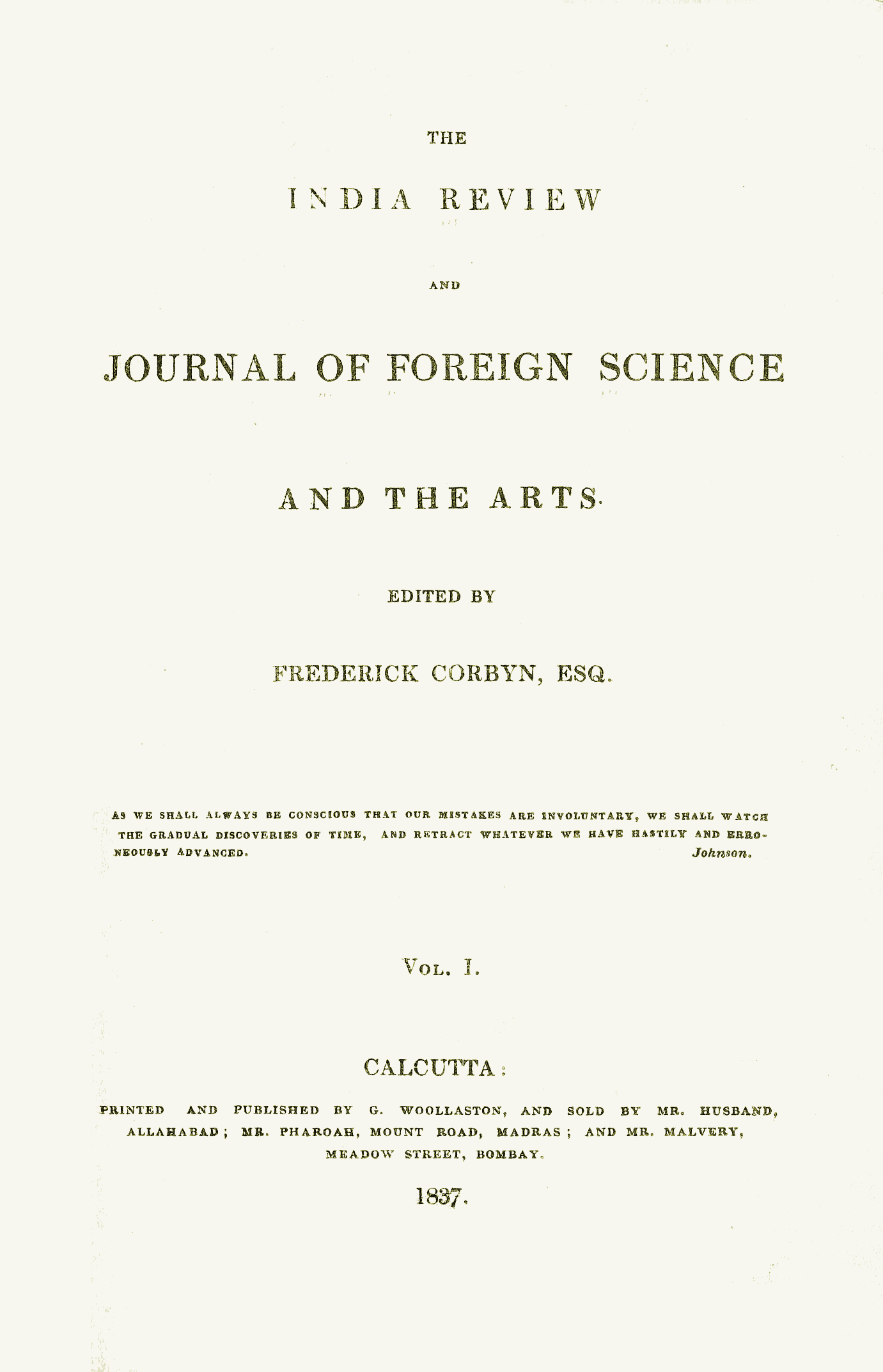
Cover of The India Review

Corbyn joined the Bengal Army in 1813 and served with the 25th native infantry in Nepal. He managed the store from 1817 and became a civil surgeon in Allahabad in 1822. He became full surgeon in 1826. In 1831 he became garrison surgeon at Fort William. He moved to Lahore in 1843 and died at Simla on October 7, 1853. A memorial tablet is in Christ Church, Simla.

In 1828 he wrote on the Management and Diseases of Infants under the Influence of the Climate of India (the oldest pediatric publication in India) and in 1832 he published a Treatise on the Epidemic Cholera. In 1836, he started a journal sometimes known as Corbyn's Journal called the India Journal of Medical and Physical Science published in Calcutta in seven volumes from 1836 to 1842. The journal originated from the Indian Journal of Medical Science (1834–1835) founded by John Grant (1794–1862) and John Thomas Pearson (1801–1851) and was the first medical journal published in India. Corbyn made notes on medical history in the journal and noted that at the end of the 18th century Regimental surgeons in India were allowed to make purchases and contracts through which they made large fortunes. Corbyn also founded the India Review and Journal of Foreign Science and the Arts in 1836 which he renamed to Review of Works on Science and Journal of Foreign Science and the Arts Embracing Mineralogy, Geology, Natural History, Physics which reviewed scientific advances. He edited it monthly but the publication ceased in 1842. In 1840, he published The Science of National Defence with Reference to India. Two sons Frederic (1827–1868) and Joseph Christian (1829–1912) also became army surgeons.
