= Ethnic communities in Kanpur =

Kanpur, India, is the most cosmopolitan city in the state of Uttar Pradesh with vast number of ethnic groups and races. The city is mostly occupied by people from Uttar Pradesh. However, beside from Uttar Pradesh there are also people from other states and countries like-Punjabis, Irish, Bengalis, South Indians, Anglo Indian, Gujaratis, Iraqis, Portuguese, Gypsies, Parsis , Pathans etc.

== Bengalis ==
The Bengali diaspora communities in Eastern Uttar Pradesh, Bihar and Jharkhand are mostly composed of Brahmins and some other upper castes of Brahminical Hinduism. Most of these moved to these places in the colonial period, starting as sepoys in the early nineteenth century and continuing as petty clerks in the administration, teachers and later, doctors, lawyers and officers in companies and businesses. Most of this stemmed from the "early adopter" advantage that the forward caste Bengalis had when it came to adopting Western education.

A big reason for Bengalis migrating to Kanpur is the fact that Bengal was the first Indian province that came under British rule and large swathes of Northern and Eastern India continued to be ruled from Calcutta for a long time. The cities of Varanasi and Prayagraj too were in the British empire since the early nineteenth century, and the cities of Agra, Kanpur and Lucknow were added in 1836 to form the "North-Western Provinces". There is huge population of Bengalis in Bengali Mohal and Golaghat. Abhijeet Bhattacharya, a popular singer of Bengali origin belongs to Kanpur.

== Punjabis ==
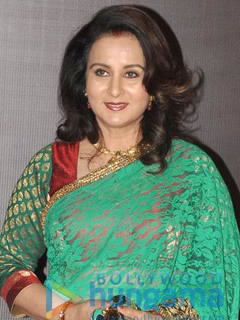
Poonam Dhillon belongs to Punjabi family of the city

There was presence of Punjabis in Kanpur before independence. Majority of them indulged in industrial and trade activities. After 1947, thousands of Hindu and Sikh refugees arrived at Kanpur from Pakistan. Govind Nagar, Gumti No. 5 and Harjinder Nagar are important Sikh localities in the city. After 1984 anti-Sikh riots, many Sikhs fled to Punjab and Delhi thus decreasing the population of Punjabis. Hindu Punjabi khatris are concentrated mainly all around the city with heavy population in Krishna Nagar and Shyam Nagar in the eastern part of city. Some Muslim Punjabi communities like Bisati and Shamsi are also found in the city who are engage in the leather trade among other trades. The Punjabi Mahapanchayat was formed in the city in 2008 to protect and safeguard the rights of Punjabis. Prem Kumar Sahgal, member of Azad Hind Fauj was resident of Kanpur. Hard Kaur, a popular Hindi and English rap singer of Punjabi origin belongs to Kanpur. Actresses like Poonam Dhillon and Kritika Kamra also belong to the city.

== Irish ==
Many Irish were employed as clergymen and sepoys in British East India Company. Some of whom also died in various massacres against British in India which included targeted attacks to white men. Today Irish people are negligible in population and live in various localities of the city. Hugh Wheeler who was general in British Army belonged to Anglo-Irish background. He died in the city during the massacre at Massacre Ghat. His descendants are still believed to be living in the city.

== Romanis ==
Romanis started migrating to Kanpur from Rajasthan villages due to scarcity of water there. A group of romanis along with 6,000 sheep, 100 camels and 20 dogs settled in Sirhi Itara village which is in close proximity from the city.

== Gujaratis ==
There are more than 250 Gujarati families with population roughly equal to around 3000. The Gujarati Samaj is the oldest and apex body of the community in the city. It was established 115 years back when Magan Lal Savla came to the city and set up his own business. The Savla family migrated about 10 decades ago and since has well established business in the city. Gujarat Bhawan situated at Nayaganj hold their important cultural and religious events every year.

== Portuguese ==
In late 18th century there was a large population of Portuguese people in the city which included traders and businessmen. When the city was captured by British forces most of the Portuguese left the city. The old Portuguese graveyard or Kutchery Cemetery is situated at VIP Road where Archaeological Survey of India's office is present. At present there is small population of Portuguese scattered across the city. Allan de Noronha, president of All India Catholic Union is from the city and resides in the city. Brian Silas, a popular piano player and musician belongs to Kanpur.

== Marathis ==
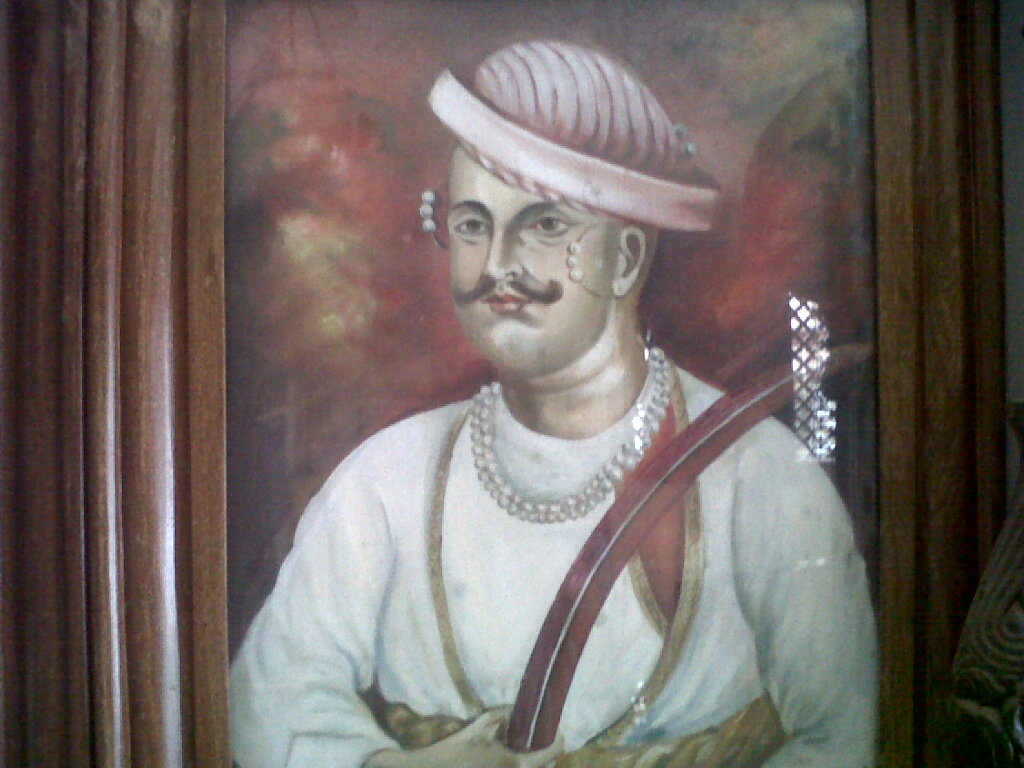
A portrait of Nana Sahib at the Peshwa Memorial atop Parvati Hill in Pune, India

Kanpur is home to more than 2000 Marathi families. The approximate Marathi population in the city is around 20,000. The reason of the vast population of Marathis is because of the presence of Nana Sahib, a Maratha freedom fighter who resided at Bithoor (about 25 km from Kanpur). Every year, the Marathi people celebrate Ganesh Chaturthi, which is also celebrated with among the local Hindu population. Maharashtra Bhawan, situated at Khalasi Lines, is an important Marathi cultural centre in the city. The building was vandalised in the year 2009 by angry Bihari mobs who were protesting the persecution of Biharis in Maharashtra. Veena Sahasrabuddhe, a noted Hindustani Classical vocalist was born in Kanpur in 1948.

== Parsis ==
Once a strong community with population above 800, at present there are 35 Parsis in Kanpur with their Fire Temple at The Mall. Most of the Parsis belong to Javeri family who came to the city as industrialists before independence.

== South Indians ==
There is a small population of southern Indians who have settled permanently in Kanpur and are spread throughout the city. Southern Indians in Kanpur mostly belong to the Malayali and Tamil ethnic/linguistic group and are mostly Hindu while a large segment are also Christian. They migrated to the city mainly for jobs opportunities and educational purposes. Lakshmi Swaminathan, freedom fighter and member of Azad Hind Fauj was of Malayali decent settled in the city.

== Sindhis ==
In 1951 there were 9000 Sindhi people of Pakistani ancestry in Kanpur. Today there are about 1.5 lakh people of the Sindhi community in the city most of them merchants and businessman. They migrated to the city during partition in 1947. There is large community of them in Sindhi Colony in Shastri Nagar locality of the city. Laxman Das Rupani, owner of Rupani Footwear and a prominent industrialist and social worker of the city belongs to Sindhi family.

== Iraqis ==
Iraqi biradri is a community of Sunni Muslims from eastern Uttar Pradesh where the community has a historic Iraqi origin, believed to have come to Ghazipur, India, in the 14th century from Iraq. Some members moved to the city earlier in the colonial times. As time progressed they have majority population in Jajmau area of the city where leather tanneries are concentrated in large amount. Presently the population in Kanpur is estimated to be above 30 thousand or so. Most of the community members speak Urdu, and Bhojpuri and maintain a strong affiliation with their eastern UP roots with many still having ancestral houses in the Bhojpuri belt of UP. About 80% of the tanneries are owned by members of the Iraqi Biradri who are possibly responsible provide employment to over 250,000 people. An Iraqi Biradri Market in Baconganj is among the most popular markets in the city. Ghazala Lari, a politician and Mushir-Riaz, film producers and Alhaj Minnatullah, Indian businessman belong to the city.

== Anglo Indians ==
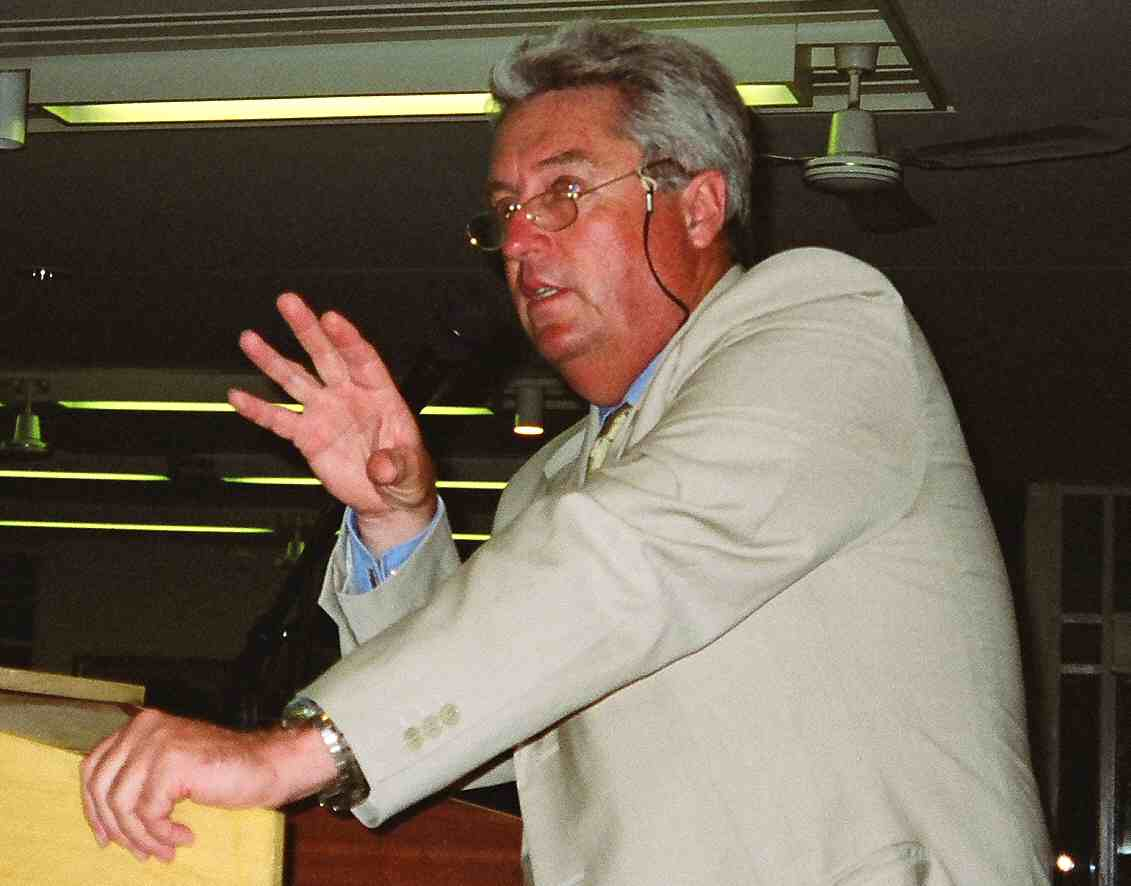
Woolmer speaking at a cricket dinner in Cape Town in December 1999

The Anglo Indian population in the city is estimated to be above 5,000. Though, a strong thriving community of the city before independence with population more than 10,000, now they are only found in some pockets of the city like McRobertganj, Khalasi Lines, Maxwellganj, Green Park, Cantonment, Allenganj, Swaroop Nagar, Permat, Gwaltoli, Nawabganj and Arya Nagar. The All India Anglo Indian Association of the city has its headquarter near UKCA School or Sheiling House. Even though they have preserved their culture, many have mixed with local Christian population. Jamed Douglas Binge is the current chairman of AIAIA Kanpur and senior most Anglo Indian of the city. Bob Woolmer, an eminent cricket player belonged to an Anglo Indian family of the city. Charles Allen, a British freelance writer and a popular historian belongs to Kanpur and often refers to himself as 'Kanpurwala'.

== Pathans ==
The Pathans are descendants of Afghan Settlers who came in India during the rule of Delhi sultanate & Mughal empire. According to the gazetteer of Kanpur in 1891, there were 16,794 Pathans in Kanpur District. There are many Pathan tribes found in Kanpur, the largest being Yousafzai and many other tribes with smaller population like Ghoris, Lodhis, and Bangash. One of the chief Pathan families of Pathans was Chaudharis of Derapur who once owned 84 villages. They trace their origin from Khudad Khan, a Pathan general during the reign of Akbar.

Pathan Tribes in Kanpur according to census of 1891
Tribe	Population	Tehsils with Prominent Populations
Yousafzai	4101	Cawnpore, Akbarpur & Bhognipur
Lodhi	2455	Cawnpore, Derapur & Bilhaur
Ghori	1879	Cawnpore, Akbarpur ,Bhognipur & Bilhaur
Bangash	611	Bilhaur
Afridi	196	Cawnpore
Rohilla	171	Cawnpore
Others	7,381	All tehsils
total	16,794	

== See also ==
- Kanpur
- List of people from Kanpur
