= The Mall, Kanpur =

Central business district in India

The Mall or Mall Road, also known as Mahatma Gandhi Road, is a central business district of Indian city of Kanpur. The area houses many shopping complexes, hotels, MNCs and shopping stores. Mall Road is one of the busiest roads of the city, traffic is daily thrown out of gear here. The road houses the biggest mall of the city, Christ Church College built in 1866, Reserve Bank of India, GPO and many other prominent buildings.

== Location ==
Mall Road is situated in the Heart of the City between Cantonment and Civil Lines. To the south of Mall Road is the old city which is a congested area and to the north is Civil Lines and Ganga river. Mall Road starts at the end point of Murray Company Flyover in Cantonment and ends at Chunniganj near Lal Imli Mills, the first woollen mill of India. The 'Bada Chauraha' is the busiest crossing on Mall Road connecting it to Kanpur Central Railway Station through Meston Road and Sarsayya Ghat through Sarsayya Ghat Road where a cable bridge is proposed over the Ganga River. The Head Post Office of Kanpur is situated on this road junction. Ursula Horsman Memorial Hospital, the largest district hospital in the city is also situated on this road. The Landmark Hotel which is largest in the city is also present here near Naveen Market. Kanpur Electricity Supply Company has its head office on this road. Parking is provided by Kanpur Development Authority on Multilevel Parkings at Parade, Express Road and Phool Bagh. Many prominent banks like RBI, Standard Chartered Bank, Allahabad Bank and Calcutta Insurance Building have their zonal office here. Life Insurance Corporation of India North Central Regional Office is situated on this road near Birhana Road Crossing. The Nana Rao Park is located in proximity to the Mall and is a popular tourist attraction.

== History ==
Mall Road has always been an important commercial and recreational center for people of Kanpur. It is often referred as Downtown, Kanpur. During British Era, Mall Road was only opened for Britishers and entry of Indians was restricted here. Indians couldn't drive here or sit on benches established by municipality. Mall Road was an important nightlife center during that time and housed many clubs like Murray & Co, Kellners, Khonolal & Sons, Regal etc. During post independence era Mall Road remained as important retail and commercial center for Kanpurites and till today it has maintained its charms with high rises on both the sides of road. Christ Church College situated on Mall Road is the oldest college in the city of Kanpur. Ursula Horsman Hospital, named in the memorial of Ursula Horsman, wife of Sir Henry Horsman and Alice Horsman Hospital (AHM) Hospital named in the memorial of the mother of Sir Henry Horsman, who was incharge of the Swadeshi Cotton Mills in Kanpur was established here in 1937. St. Catherine's Hospital, established by Dr. Alice Marval came into being to serve women and children as the first nursing institute for women in India. Alice Marval was born in 1865 in Britain and left for India under SPG Mission. She treated poor patients with plague in the hospital. Medical Mission work began among the women of Kanpur in 1697 during the reign of King William III of England when the first team of medical staff from the SPG Mission under the management of "Women Mission Association". The hospital was converted into a general hospital in 1986.

== Attractions ==
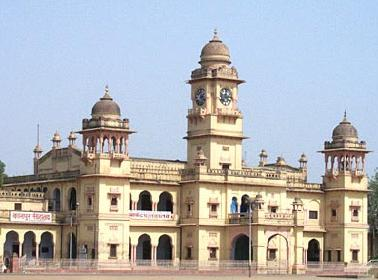
King Edward Memorial

- Nana Rao Park, Kanpur's biggest park
- King Edward Memorial
- Christ Church College
- The Landmark Hotel, tallest five star hotel in Kanpur
- Z Square Mall, the largest mall in Kanpur
- Phool Bagh, earlier Queen's Park
- Mega Mall
- Naveen Market
- Parade Market
- Mercury Dry Cleaners
- Victoria Hotel Building
- Som Dutt Plaza (IT Complex)
- Parsi Fire Temple (the only Parsi temple in Uttar Pradesh)
- KDA Crystal Shopping Complex
- City Centre
- Saint Catherine's Hospital
- Comrade Ram Aasrey Park
- Tibetan Market

== See also ==
- Meston Road, Kanpur
- VIP Road, Kanpur
- Latouche Road, Kanpur
- Birhana Road, Kanpur
