= Becon =

BECON is the former name of the American television station WBEC-TV.

Becon is an English surname; notable people with this name include:

- John Becon (died 1587), English divine
- Richard Becon, English administrator in Ireland and author
- Thomas Becon (1510s–1567), English cleric and reformer

BEcon, an abbreviation for the Bachelor of Economics

== See also ==
- Becon Ganj, an area in Kanpur, India
- Pont de Levallois–Bécon station, a Paris Metro station
- Beacon (disambiguation)
- Bacon (disambiguation)
