= Z Square Mall, Kanpur =

Z-Square Mall
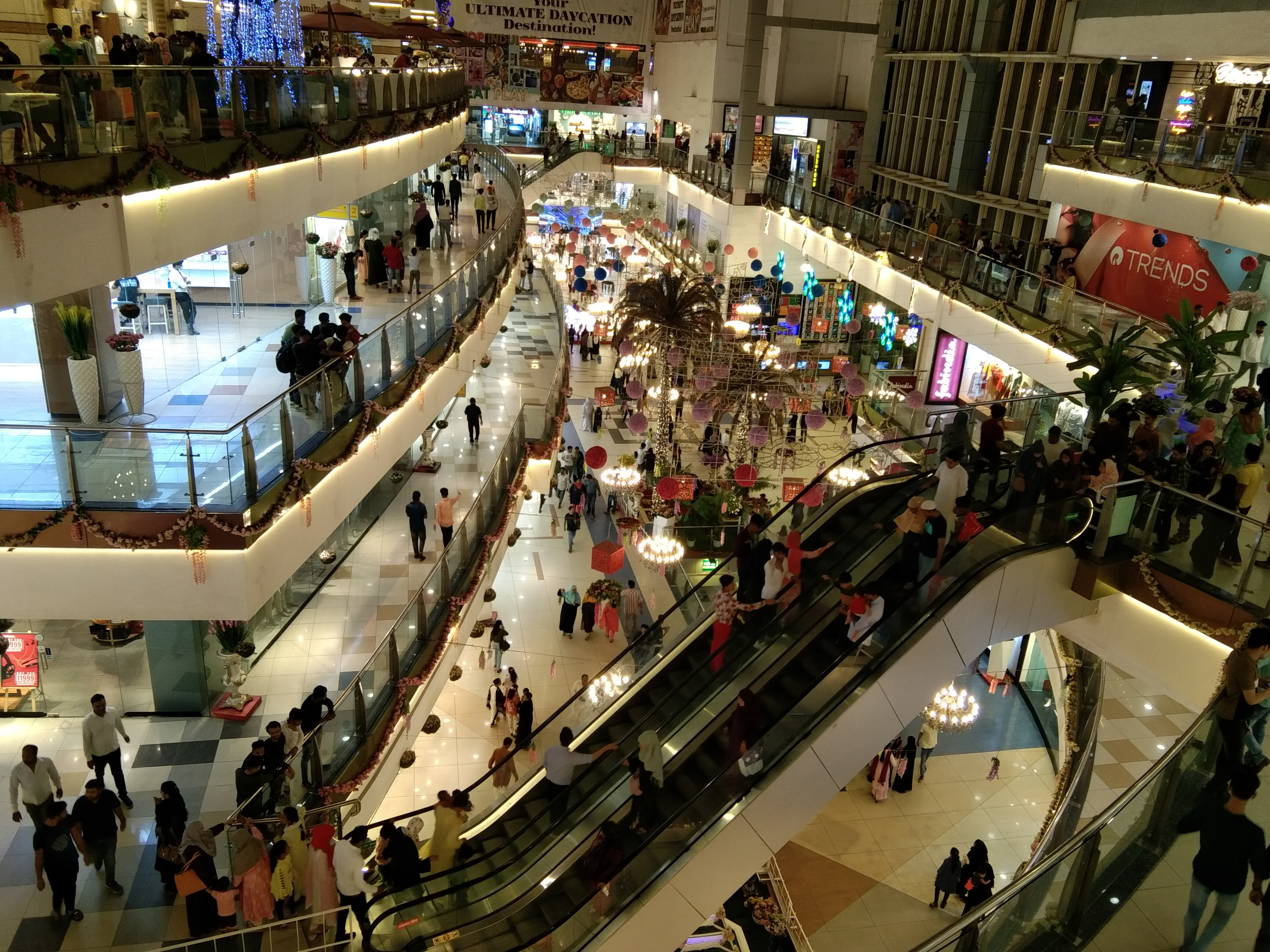
- Z Square Mall interior
- Location: 16/113, MG Marg, Kanpur
- Coordinates: 26.473239°N 80.352802°E
- Opened: 2010
- Owner: ZAZ Group
- Architect: Hafeez Contractor
- Num. of stores: 150+
- Floor area: 84,000 square metres (900,000 sq ft)
- Floors: 5
- Website: zsquaremall.com

Z Square Mall is a shopping mall cum entertainment complex in the Indian city of Kanpur. The mall is spread on an area of five acres in the middle of Kanpur city with 84,000 square metres of built-up area and the presence of more than 150 National & International brands. The mall is ranked as seventh largest mall in India by hellotravel, a reputed travel agency. The mall is owned by reputed Zaz Tanners Group which has its leather industries in Jajmau, Kanpur and Unnao.

== Location ==
The Mall is located in the city's most expensive area named as The Mall or Mall Road at Bada Chauraha Crossing. Its close proximity to Kanpur Central railway station and Naveen Market makes it the busiest retail destination in Kanpur. It is located at a distance of 17 kilometres from Chakeri Airport.
