= Laṇḍā scripts =

Writing systems of northwestern Indian subcontinent

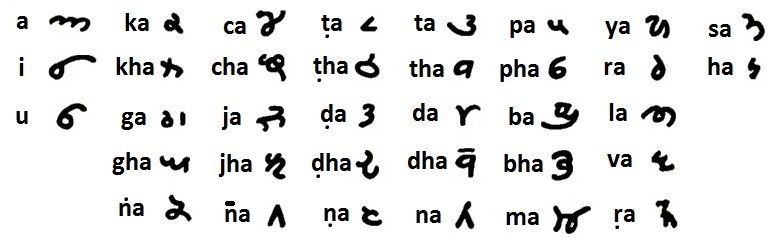
- Landa script chart
- Script type: Alphabet, with some abugida descendents
- Period: 10th-11th century CE
- Direction: Left-to-right

Related scripts
- Parent systems: Egyptian hieroglyphs: Proto-Sinaitic alphabet; Phoenician alphabet; Aramaic alphabet (debated); Brahmi script; Gupta script; Sharada script; Laṇḍā scripts
- Child systems: Gurmukhi, Khojki, Khudabadi, Mahajani, Multani, others
- Sister systems: Takri script

The Laṇḍā scripts, from the term laṇḍā meaning "without a tail", is a Punjabi word used to refer to writing systems used in Punjab and adjoining areas. In Sindhi, it was known as 'Wāṇiko' or 'Baniyañ'. Formerly used to write Punjabi by mercantile groups, its usage is in decline.

== Development ==
Laṇḍā is a script that evolved from the Sharada script during the 10th century. It was widely used in the northern and northwestern Indian subcontinent, in the Indus River plain, and adjoining areas, comprising Punjab, Sindh, Kashmir, and some parts of Balochistan and Khyber Pakhtunkhwa. It was used to write languages including Punjabi in its various dialects and registers, languages of Haryana, Sindhi, Siraiki,Balochi, Kashmiri, and Pashto.

The Laṇḍā scripts form a "typologically distinct group," and are closer in norms to its predecessor Brāhmī than they are to the Nāgarī scripts to the east, in their general avoidance of conjunct glyphs or marking of the Middle Indo-Aryan geminations distinctive of Panjābī. While possessing full sets of consonants, even separate letters for the common Lahndā consonant clusters tr and dr, their indication of vowels is less regular; they possess three vowel letters to indicate initial /ə ɪ ʊ/, but no letters or signs in other positions, thus being "alphabetical on the restricted Semitic model of Ugaritic cuneiform."

=== Functions ===
Landa scripts were originally used as mercantile shorthand for commercial purposes in the Punjab region and Sindh; they often lacked the full set of vowel sounds, as well as often imperfect correspondence of consonants. This made them liable to misreadings, frequently recognized by the local population through local proverbs referring to its usefulness only to the original writer. Various technical improvements would make certain descendant scripts fully suitable for literary use, primarily motivated by interest in recording religious scripture, particularly in the cases of Gurmukhī in Punjab, and Khojkī in Sindh.

== Variants ==
The Laṇḍā scripts was first classified by George Abraham Grierson. Pandey (2010) further classifies Laṇḍā scripts into "Panjābī" and "Sindhī" regional subclasses:

- Panjābī: Gurmukhī, Bahāwalpurī, Lamawasī (in Pindi Bhattian and Chunian), Lundas (in Sialkot and Wazirabad) Multānī (also known as Kiṛakkī and Sarāī), Parachi (in Bhera and Khushab), Thul, Sarika (both in Derajat), Uch (in Massan, Jhang)
- Sindhī (named after the various regions, communities, or occupations with which they were associated): Aroṛā, Baniyā, Bhatiā, Haidarābādī, Karadī, Khudāwādī, Khwājā (Khojkī), Haṭāī, Haṭavāṇikā, Laraī, Lohāṇākī (Lohāṇā), Maimon, Rajaī, Sakkar, Shikārpurī, Sewhanī Bhabhira, Thatta (Thattai), Vaniyā, Wangaī, Wāṇiko

Grammarians of the 19th century variously identified as many as six Laṇḍā forms used in Punjab and as many as twelve in Sindh. Further typological differences used in this subclassification include:

- character repertoire: the Laṇḍā character sets of the Sindhī class possess characters for the implosive consonants of the language;
- character shapes: common letters can be identified by subclass depending on shape;
- collation: Panjābī Laṇḍā shares Gurmukhī's sorting order, starting with vowels, then fricatives sa and ha, then the 5×5 set of occlusives, then sonorants, while Sindhī Laṇḍā follows Devanāgarī more closely; and
- orthographic norms: Panjābī Laṇḍā do not use dependent vowel diacritics, the approximate vowel letter is written after the consonant letter, e.g. the syllable /ki/ is written with the letter 'k' followed by the letter 'i'. After standardization, dependent vowel diacritics were introduced into Sindhī Laṇḍā.

Even within these subclasses, the scripts exhibit further differences.

=== Fully attested ===
Ephemera in Landa scripts
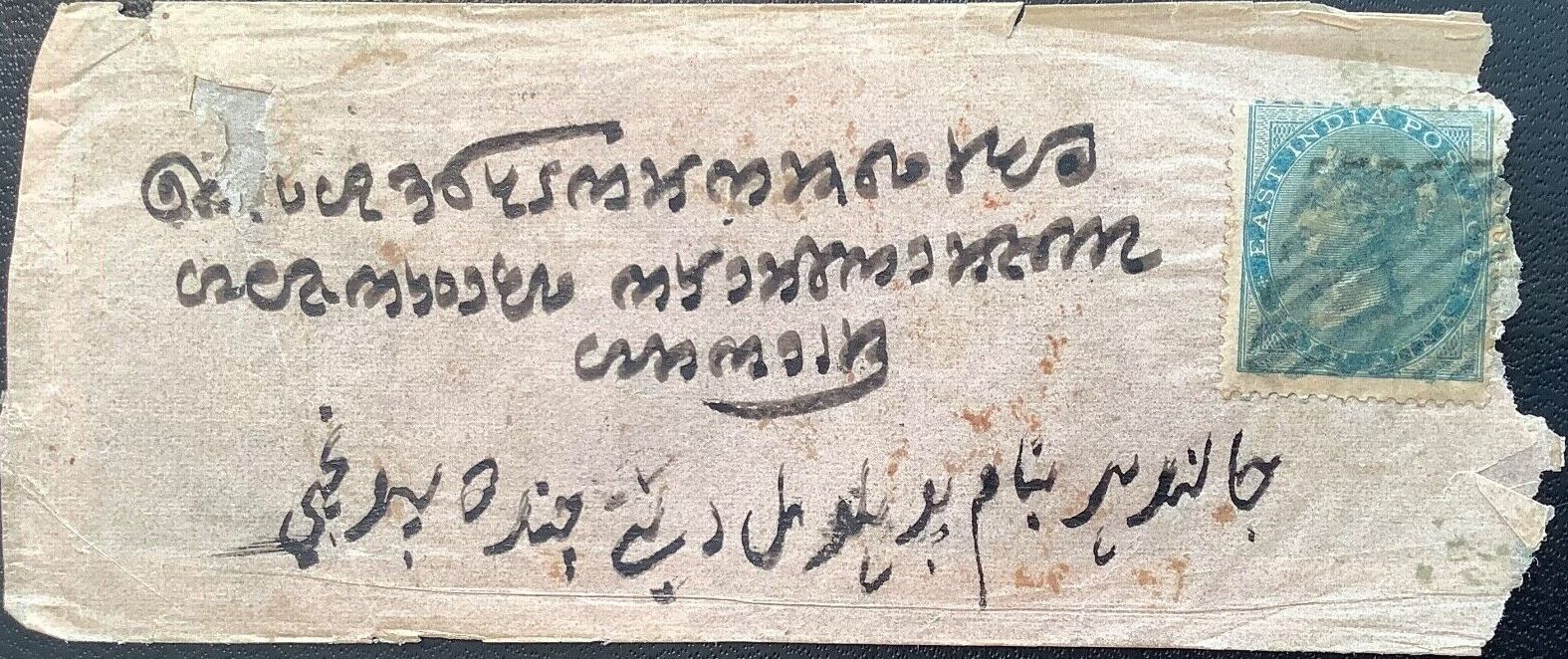
Punjabi postcard dispatched from Jagraon, Ludhiana written in a Laṇḍā script, December 1866

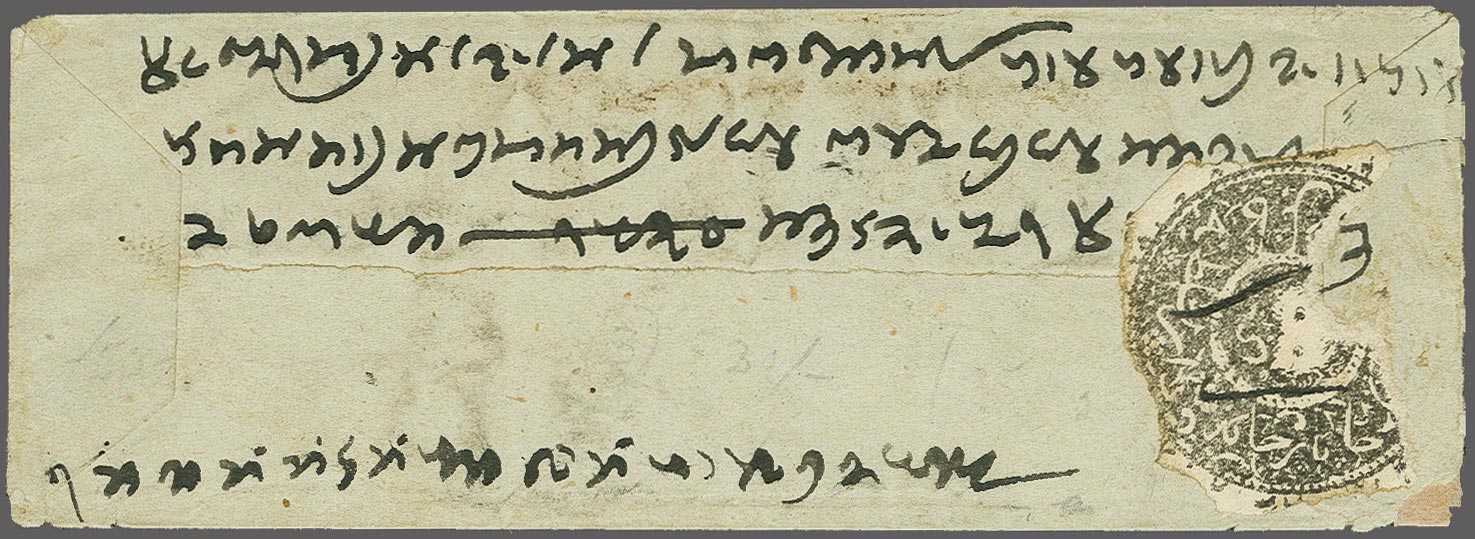
Postcard from Afghanistan written in a Laṇḍā script, ca.1871–72

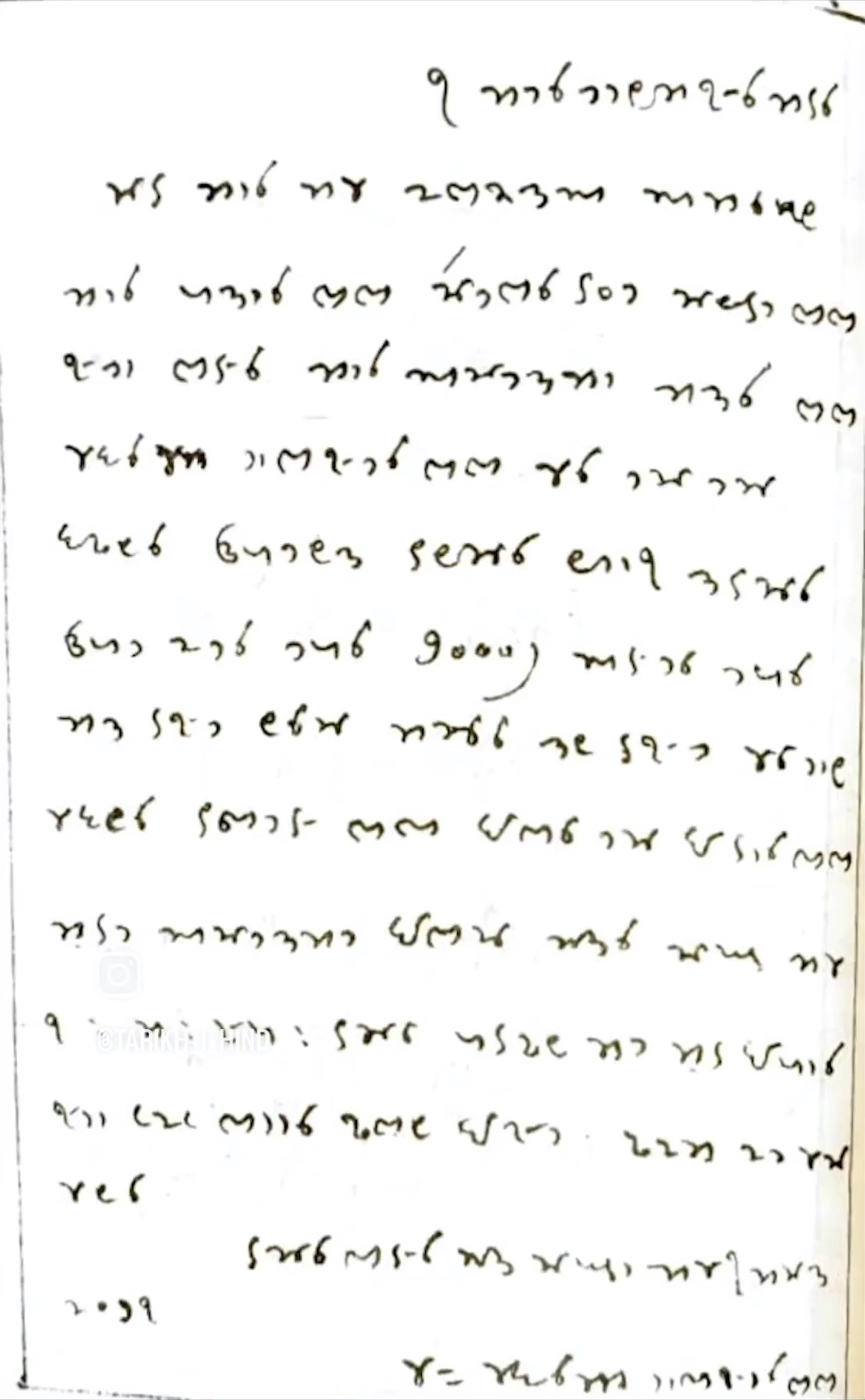
Page written in a Laṇḍā script

Currently, five Laṇḍā-descended scripts have enough information to be supported in Unicode.

1. Gurmukhī is used for Panjābī and sometimes for Sindhī. Originally used in Sikh scripture and writings, it is the only major Laṇḍā-descended script in modern day usage. It has preserved the distinctive names of letters (kakkā, khakkhā, etc.) and collation order of Laṇḍā (vowels→ fricatives→ occlusives→ sonorants). In keeping with Laṇḍā's proximity to Brāhmī, it has retained a particularly close resemblance to Brāhmī among living scripts. Helping to foster a distinct Sikh culture and contributing to the consolidation of the Sikh religion, as well as first being a vehicle of Sikh religious literature, Gurmukhi became particularly important in the eighteenth and nineteenth centuries when the Sikhs established political hegemony over Punjab and Kashmir.
2. Khojkī, also known as caliha akhari or "the forty letters," an ecclesiastical script of the Isma'ili Khoja community, is considered to be a refined version of Lohāṇākī. Originally developed for Sindhi, it had also been used for Punjabi, Saraiki, and Gujarati as it spread, as well as for Arabic and Persian. Shifts in correspondences of letters most commonly included implosive letters for the tenuis consonants, and tenuis letters for aspirated stops. Such shifts was partly because as Khojkī spread to languages without Sindhī's implosives, the corresponding letters lost their original values, leading to shifts and ambiguity in usage. It remained in general use by the community until the early 20th century, as the printing press facilitated its increasing replacement by the Gujarati script for Ismāʿīlī literature. By the 1940s, its printing and instruction were confined to its native Sindh, where it survived until the early 1970s, continuing to be taught in community schools until it was superseded by Perso-Arabic.
3. Standard Khudābādī, formerly used for Sindhī, was derived in the 1860s from Khudāwādī, the script associated with merchant communities of Hyderabad, Sindh, the Lohāṇā type of which Khojkī was "very close" to, being supplemented with characters from Shikārpurī. It is now obsolete. Through official government initiative and encouragement, it developed into a vehicle for literary expression.
4. Mahājanī, a script previously used for Panjābī and Mārwāṛī, was taught to students from merchant and trading classes for business, and was similar to other accounting scripts like Sarrāfī ("of bankers"), Koṭhīvāl, and Baniauṭī ("of merchants"). Attested mostly from merchant documents, bills of exchange, and letters. It had five vowel letters, a, e, i, o, u, with the letter for i also used for ī, e, ai and the letter for u also used for ū, o, au. It had neither a dedicated nasalization diacritic, instead using the letter for n, nor script-specific numerals, instead using those of Devanāgarī or Gujarātī, though it does have fraction signs and unit marks, nor script-specific punctuation besides section marks and abbreviation. There are variants of certain letters, and generally did not space between words. It "may not be entirely obsolete."
5. Multānī, former writing system of Sarāikī, is now obsolete. While classed by Pandey (2012) in the Punjabi subclass, it contains implosive characters and clusters similar to those of the Sindhi subclass, that other Punjabi Landa scripts lack. It had 4 vowel letters, a, i, u, e; a was used for ā as well; i was also used for ī as well as commonly as a semivowel in place of the letter y; u was used for ū and o, and e for ai as well as o in some sources. Shifts in sound representation meant that some letters often represented more than one sound, most often with tenuis letters used for aspirated stops, and implosive letters for tenuis sounds, as well as variants of certain letters. Pandey (2012) proposes an "idealized" form for encoding, with more regular correspondences, as well as the usage of Gurmukhī numerals for Multānī, as their numerals are "nearly identical."

Comparison of attested characters of Laṇḍā-descended scripts
←Class	Script↓	Common letters																																	Implosives				Nuqtā	Gemination
←Class	IAST	sa	ha	ka	kha	ga	gha	ṅa	ca	cha	ja	jha	ña	ṭa	ṭha	ḍa	ḍha	ṇa	ta	tha	da	dha	na	pa	pha	ba	bha	ma	ya	ra	la	va	ṛa	śa	g̠a	j̄a	ḍ̠a	ḇa		
Panjābī	Gurmukhi	ਸ	ਹ	ਕ	ਖ	ਗ	ਘ	ਙ	ਚ	ਛ	ਜ	ਝ	ਞ	ਟ	ਠ	ਡ	ਢ	ਣ	ਤ	ਥ	ਦ	ਧ	ਨ	ਪ	ਫ	ਬ	ਭ	ਮ	ਯ	ਰ	ਲ	ਵ	ੜ	ਸ਼					਼	ੱ
Panjābī	Mahajani	𑅰	𑅱	𑅕	𑅖	𑅗	𑅘		𑅙	𑅚	𑅛	𑅜	𑅝	𑅞	𑅟	𑅠	𑅡	𑅢	𑅣	𑅤	𑅥	𑅦	𑅧	𑅨	𑅩	𑅪	𑅫	𑅬		𑅭	𑅮	𑅯	𑅲						𑅳	
Panjābī	Multani	𑊥	𑊦	𑊄	𑊅	𑊆	𑊈		𑊊	𑊋	𑊌		𑊏	𑊐	𑊑	𑊒	𑊔	𑊕	𑊖	𑊗	𑊘	𑊙	𑊚	𑊛	𑊜	𑊝	𑊟	𑊠	𑊡	𑊢	𑊣	𑊤	𑊧	(𑊥)	(𑊆)	𑊍	𑊓	(𑊝)		
Sindhī	Khojki	𑈩	𑈪	𑈈	𑈉	𑈊	𑈌	𑈍	𑈎	𑈏	𑈐		𑈓	𑈔	𑈕	𑈖	𑈗	𑈘	𑈙	𑈚	𑈛	𑈝	𑈞	𑈟	𑈠	𑈡	𑈣	𑈤	𑈥	𑈦	𑈧	𑈨		𑈩𑈶	𑈋	𑈑	𑈜	𑈢	𑈶	𑈷
Sindhī	Khudabadi	𑋝	𑋞	𑊺	𑊻	𑊼	𑊾	𑊿	𑋀	𑋁	𑋂	𑋄	𑋅	𑋆	𑋇	𑋈	𑋋	𑋌	𑋍	𑋎	𑋏	𑋐	𑋑	𑋒	𑋓	𑋔	𑋖	𑋗	𑋘	𑋙	𑋚	𑋛		𑋜	𑊽	𑋃	𑋉	𑋕	𑋩	

Multānī used the character 𑊥 for both sa and śa, and commonly used the characters 𑊆 ga and 𑊝 ba for their implosive counterparts as well. Both Multānī and Khojkī commonly used one letter in any given writing for both ja and jha, which are "anyway rather weakly contrasted phonemes," at least in the case of Khojkī. While both scripts each have two characters used interchangeably for both phonemes, they were conflated to the extent that the lesser-used letters of each, while attested, are not currently supported in Unicode. According to Pandey, "it is possible that a distinct letter for jha exists in a style of Multani. For this reason, space has been reserved for *jha in the [Unicode] block." In both cases, the unsupported letter shares a resemblance with Gurmukhī ਜ ja.

While Laṇḍā did not have dependent vowel signs, several descendent scripts like Gurmukhī, Khojkī and Khudābādī have developed them. Earlier Khojkī represented diphthongs in a manner more similar to Laṇḍā. Khojkī 𑈂 was typically used for both i and ī.

Comparison of vowels of Laṇḍā-descended scripts
←Class	Script↓	Independent Vowels										Vowel Diacritics								
←Class	IAST	a	ā	i	ī	u	ū	e	ai	o	au	ā	i	ī	u	ū	e	ai	o	au
Panjābī	Gurmukhi	ਅ	ਆ	ਇ	ਈ	ਉ	ਊ	ਏ	ਐ	ਓ	ਔ	ਾ	ਿ	ੀ	ੁ	ੂ	ੇ	ੈ	ੋ	ੌ
Panjābī	Mahajani	𑅐		𑅑		𑅒		𑅓	𑅑	𑅔	𑅒									
Panjābī	Multani	𑊀		𑊁		𑊂		𑊃		𑊂										
Sindhī	Khojki	𑈀	𑈁	(𑉀)	𑈂	𑈃		𑈄	𑈅	𑈆	𑈇	𑈬	𑈭	𑈮	𑈯		𑈰	𑈱	𑈲	𑈳
Sindhī	Khudabadi	𑊰	𑊱	𑊲	𑊳	𑊴	𑊵	𑊶	𑊷	𑊸	𑊹	𑋠	𑋡	𑋢	𑋣	𑋤	𑋥	𑋦	𑋧	𑋨

These scripts developed further adaptations as necessity arose. Gurmukhī has developed supplementary and subscript letters to accommodate loansounds and certain consonant clusters respectively. Mahājanī had the ligature 𑅶 śrī and various accounting signs. Multānī had the character 𑊨 ṛha, and Khudābādī had the character 𑋓𑋩 fa. Khojkī had the characters 𑈫 ḷa and 𑈿 qa, as well as conjuncts for kṣa, jña, tra, and dra, often borrowing such orthography from easterly scripts. It also made extensive use of its nuqtā to accommodate the emphatics, uvulars, and pharyngeals of Arabic. Letters of the unstandardized scripts often had glyphic variants; for instance, a variant of Multānī 𑊗 tha resembles its Gurmukhī counterpart ਥ.

==== Alphabet Charts ====
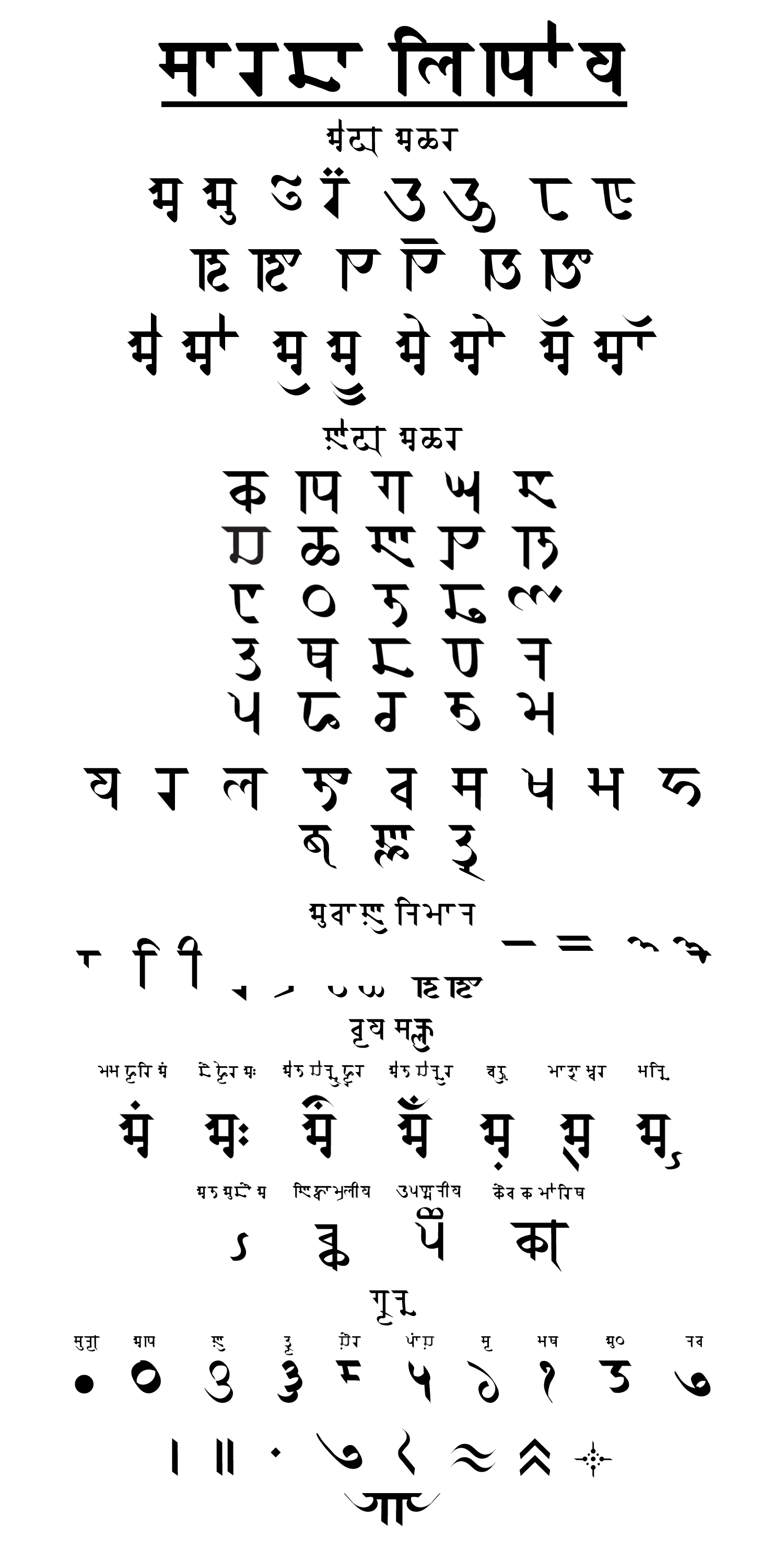
Śāradā Varnamala

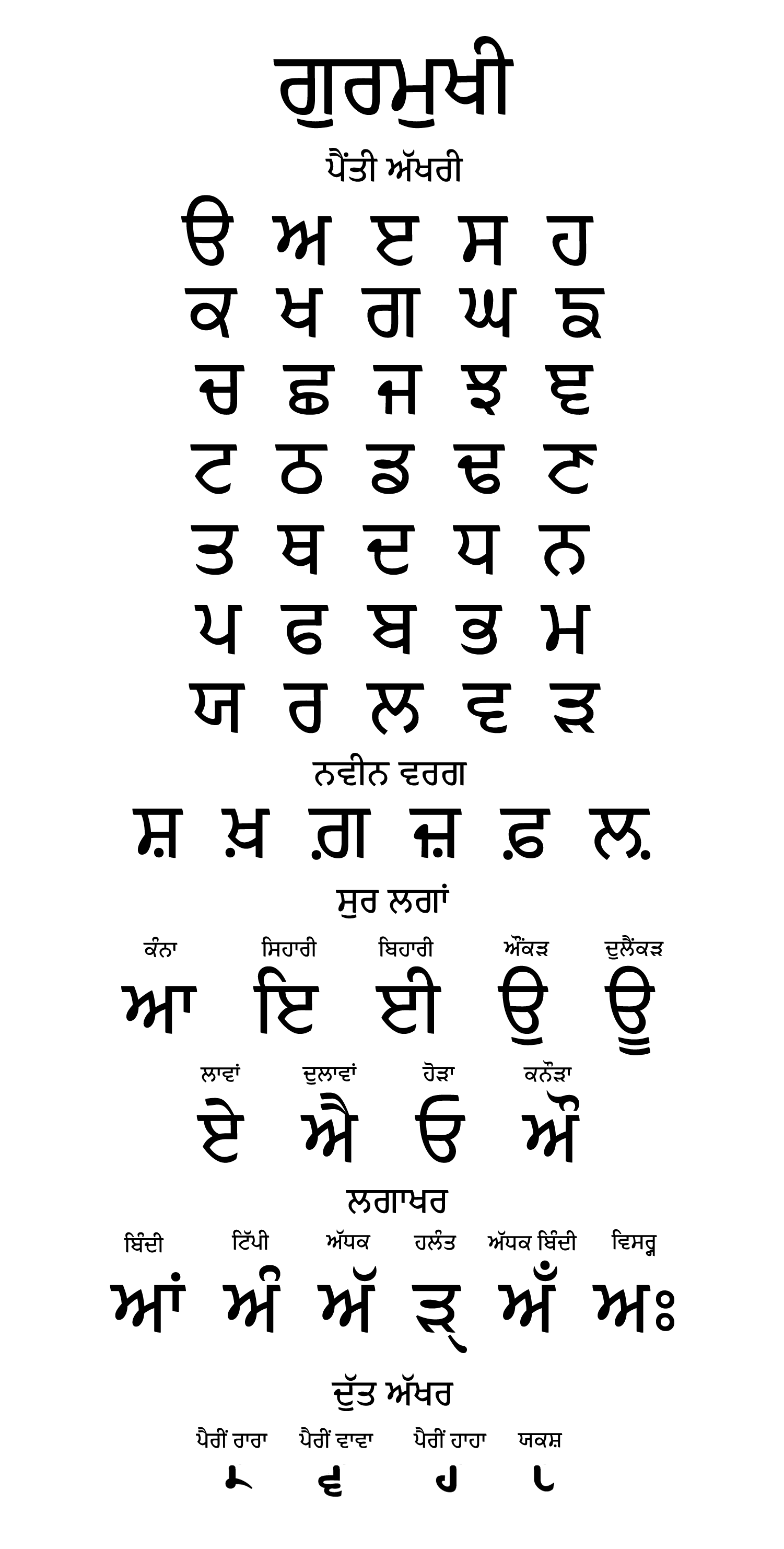
Gurmukhī Varnamala

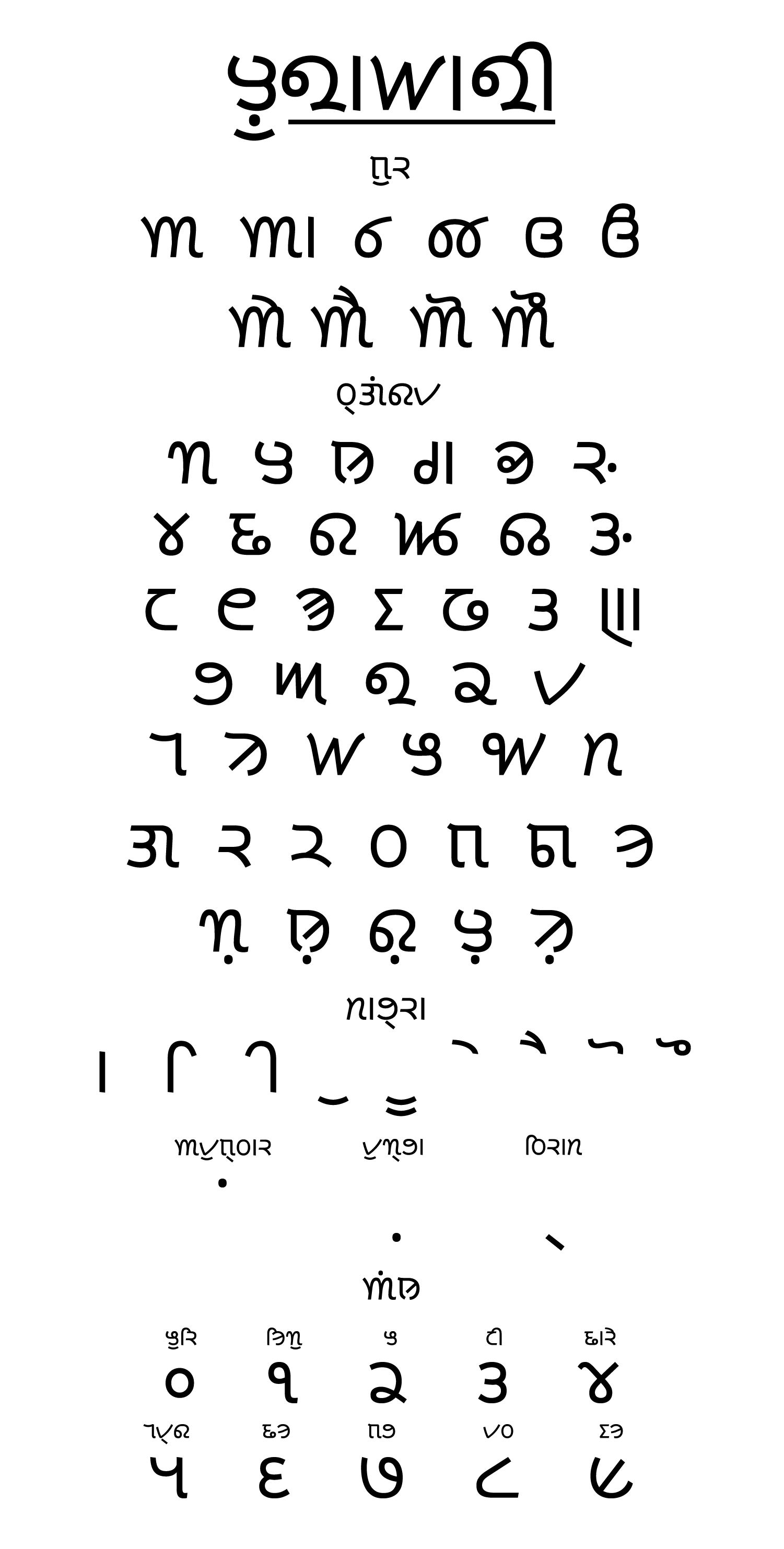
Khudabadi Varnamala

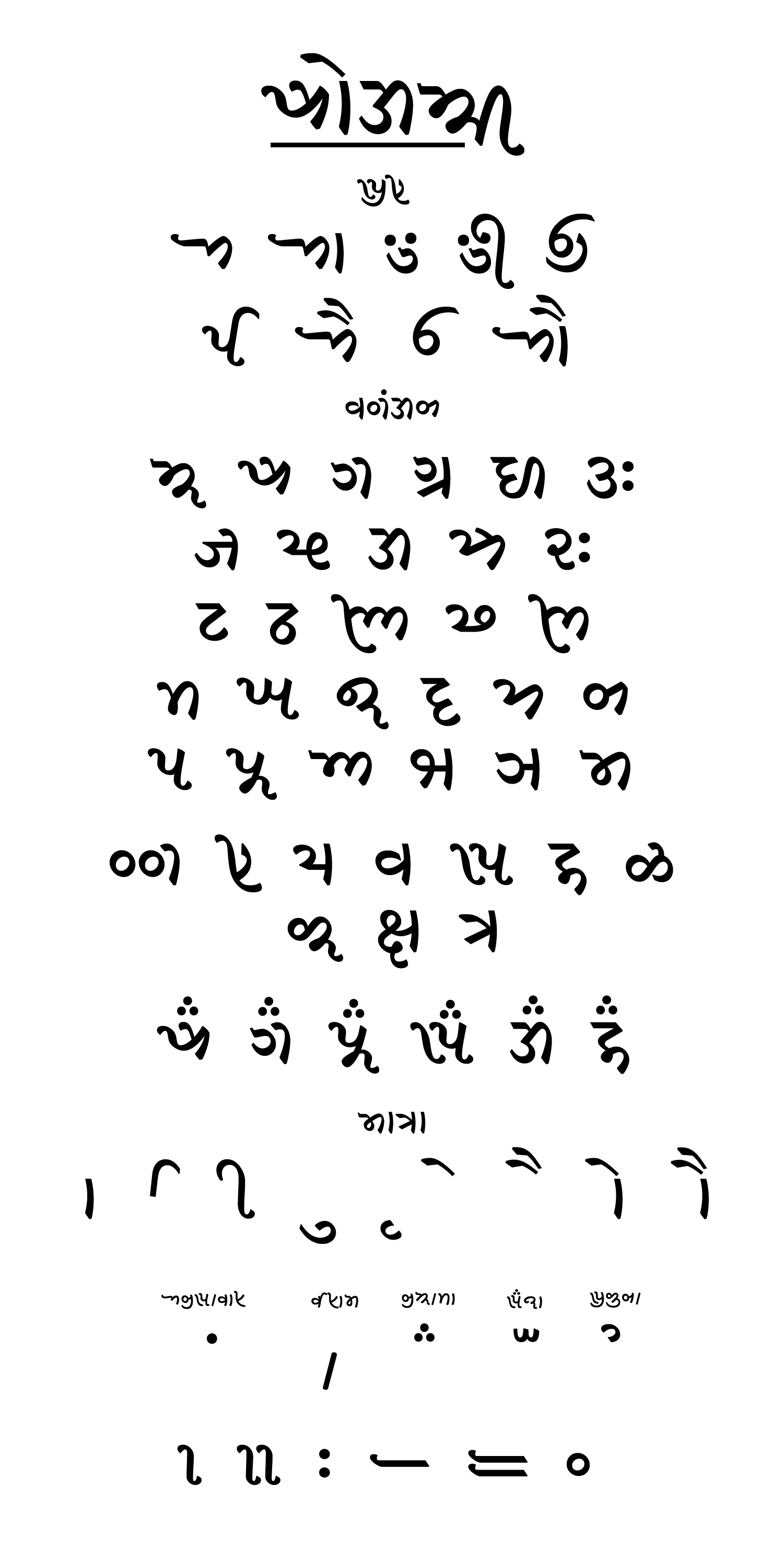
Khojki Varnamala

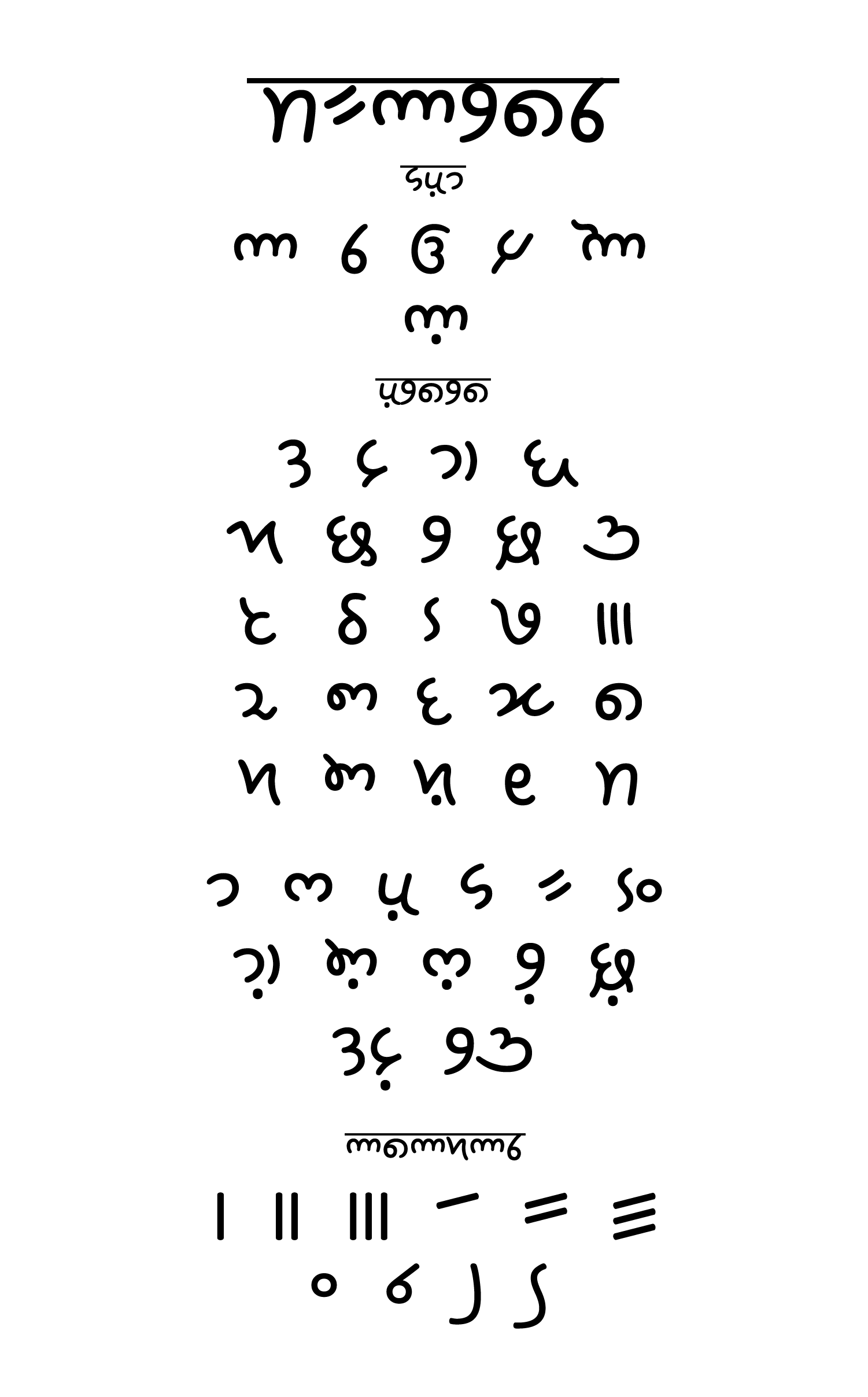
Mahajani Varnamala

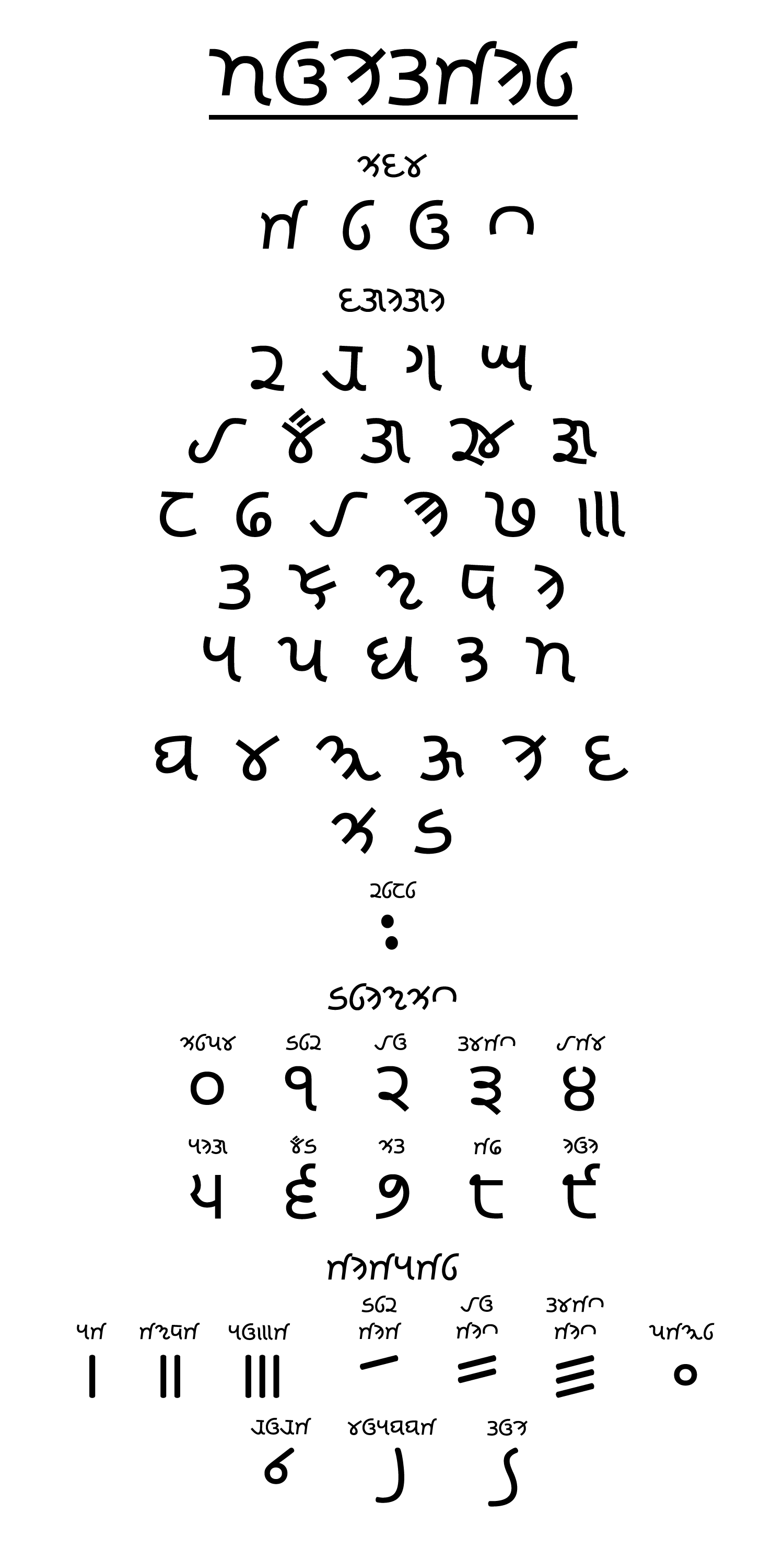
Multani Varnamala

=== Other attested, similar, and related scripts ===
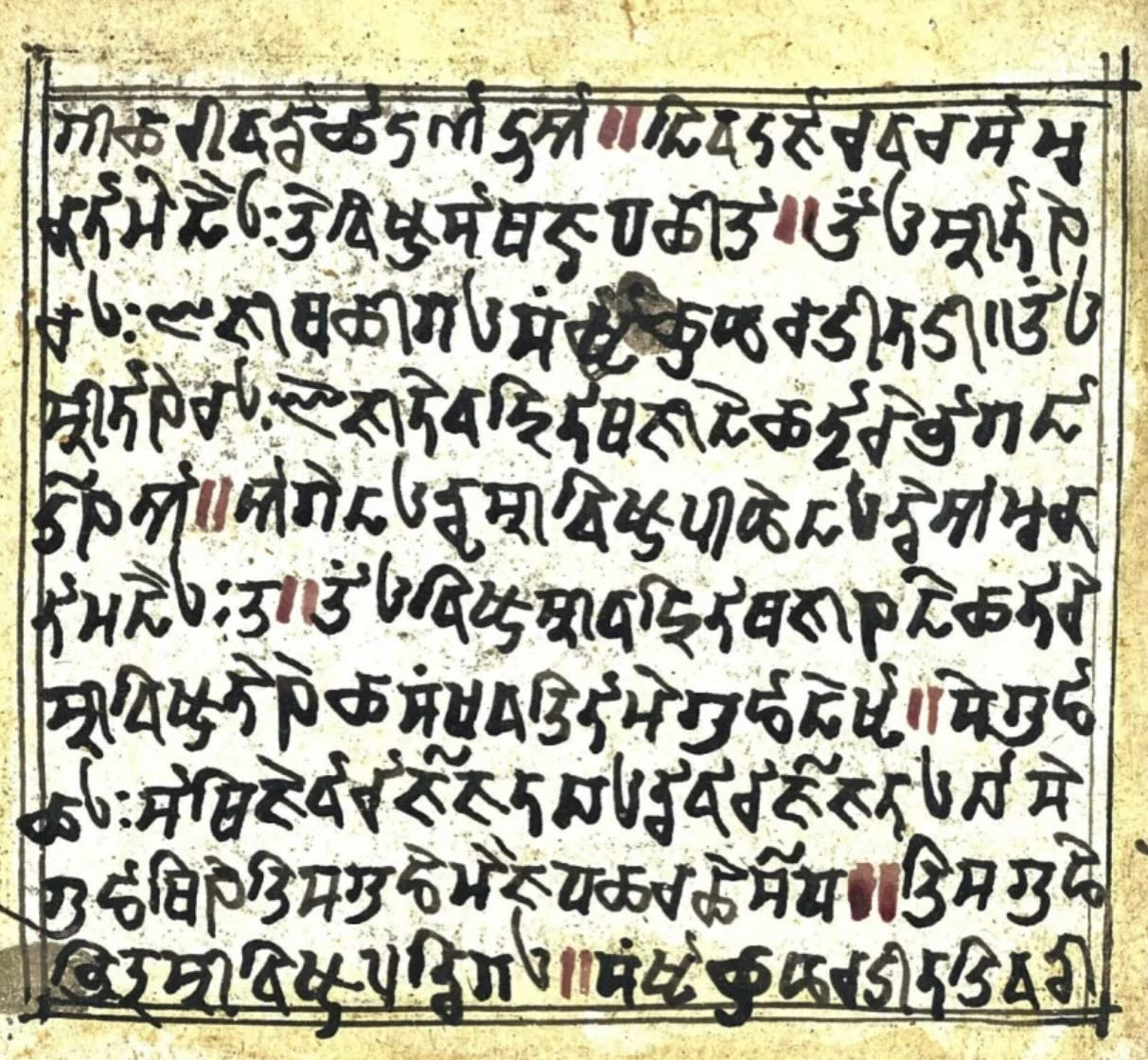
Punjabi-language manuscript of the 'Ekadashi Mahatam' written in a Punjabi variant of Sharada script, ca.1200–1300

Other Laṇḍā-linked scripts have been documented. The ones below do not have enough information to be supported in Unicode.

- Bhaṭṭākharī, also spelt bhaṭ(ṭ) ākhrī or bhaṭākshrī, was used to write the Bhat Vahi literature and was employed by historical Bhatt writers. It was a "family code such as Laṇḍā and Mahājanī," and like Laṇḍā lacked vowel signs.
- Laṅgaṛī, historically used by bookkeepers in the Haryana region, possibly a subtype of Mahājanī.
- Mundī, merchant script used by Marwari and Gujarati businessmen and bookkeepers for recording accounts and correspondences. Its name derives from the Hindi term mundā denoting bare-headedness, referring to its lack of śirorekhā, or top line characteristic of many abugidas of the area.
- Landi-Mundi, historically used to record information bahi genealogical registers, such as at Haridwar
- Scripts classified as Laṇḍā in the nineteenth century have been attested further east, including Mudia in Awadh, Garhwal, and towns in the North-Western Provinces, and Bisati Laṇḍā by Muslim traders in the North-Western Provinces.
