= Majdur (Kanpur) =

- Editor: Ganesh Shankar Vidyarthi, Harihar Nath Shashtri
- Founded: 1928
- Language: Hindi
- Headquarters: Kanpur

Majdur (Hindi: मज़दूर, 'Worker') was a Hindi weekly newspaper published from Kanpur, India. Ganesh Shankar Vidyarthi and Harihar Nath Shastri were editors of the newspaper. Majdur was not affiliated to any political party. It covered issues relating to the workers and peasants movements.

As of 1928 Majdur had a circulation of 1,000, by 1931 the weekly circulation had reached 1,500.
