= Rohit Sardana =

Indian journalist and media personality (1979–2021)

- Born: 22 September 1979; Kurukshetra, Haryana, India
- Died: 30 April 2021 (aged 41); Noida, Uttar Pradesh, India
- Occupations: News anchor; Journalist; Editor; Media personality
- Years active: 2000–2021
- Employer(s): Zee News; Aaj Tak
- Known for: Dangal on Aaj Tak; Taal Thok ke on Zee News
- Spouse: Pramila Dixit (m. 2000)
- Children: 2
- Awards: Ganesh Shankar Vidyarthi Puraskar (2018)

Rohit Sardana (22 September 1979 – 30 April 2021) was an Indian anchor, journalist, and editor. He had hosted Taal Thok Ke, a debate programme of Zee News before leaving for Aaj Tak in 2017, where he anchored the prime time show Dangal.

== Early life and education ==
Sardana had a Bachelor of Arts degree in psychology. From 2000 to 2002, Sardana completed his academic work to earn a post-graduate degree in mass communication from Guru Jambheshwar University of Science and Technology.

== Career ==
From March 2002 to July 2003, Sardana worked as a copy-editor. As a trainee copy-editor, Sardana was exposed to the technicalities of anchoring, copywriting, editing, production, and post-production work. Along with learning these skills, Sardana studied the functioning of a 24-hour news channel. Sardana worked as an assistant producer at Sahara Samay from 2003 to 2004.

Since 2004, Sardana worked at Zee News in the capacity of an executive editor, anchor, news presenter and host for the network's Hindi language programmes. He was a senior anchor at Aaj Tak. Sardana formerly worked with the ETV Network and Akashvani. Sardana also produced Karmakshetra, where MPs were assessed and "report card" was created by Sardana on the work of the MPs for their respective constituency in advance of the 2014 Indian general elections.

He hosted a show called Dangal (translation: Arena) on Aaj Tak which featured debate panels. The show has been compared to Radio Rwanda and he was criticised for demonising Muslims, encouraging jingoism and strengthening the Hindu-Muslim dichotomy through his show. Sardana was considered to be a part of the pro-government media establishment in India and has also been criticised for subservience towards Narendra Modi and the ruling Bharatiya Janata Party.

In 2018, he was awarded the Ganesh Shankar Vidyarthi Puraskar award by the Government of India.

== Death ==
Sardana died of a heart attack after testing positive for COVID-19 at a private hospital in New Delhi. President Ram Nath Kovind, PM Narendra Modi, Delhi's Deputy Chief Minister Manish Sisodia, Rajasthan's Chief Minister Ashok Gehlot, Ministry of Youth Affairs and Sports Kiren Rijiju, Union Home Minister Amit Shah, Defence Minister Rajnath Singh among many expressed their condolences on his death.
