= Mundi script =

Merchant script

Mundi was a merchant script used by Marwari and Gujarati businessmen and bookkeepers for recording accounts and correspondences. The script is believed to have been developed by Marwari accountants in Rajasthan. Its name is derived from the Rajasthani word munda, which means "bare-headedness", given to it due to the fact that the script lacks a bar at the top of the alphabet to conjoin letters, which differs it from Devanagari script. The genealogical records at Haridwar were written in a local script called Landi-Mundi. It was one of the two main scripts used by merchants in northwest India, the other being Langdi employed in the Punjab region. According to Vipin K. Garg, the merchants of India used special scripts and each region had its own particular name for their script, such as Mundi, Modi, Mudiya, Mahajani, and Sarafi. The Mundi script spread to other parts of India by the 17th or 18th century, with it having influence on merchant records written in Karnataka in Kannada script, particularly the form and style of writing. Its use continued until the early 20th century.

== See also ==
- Landa scripts
