= Mahajani =

Writing system in north-western India

Mahajani 𑅬𑅱𑅐𑅛𑅧𑅑
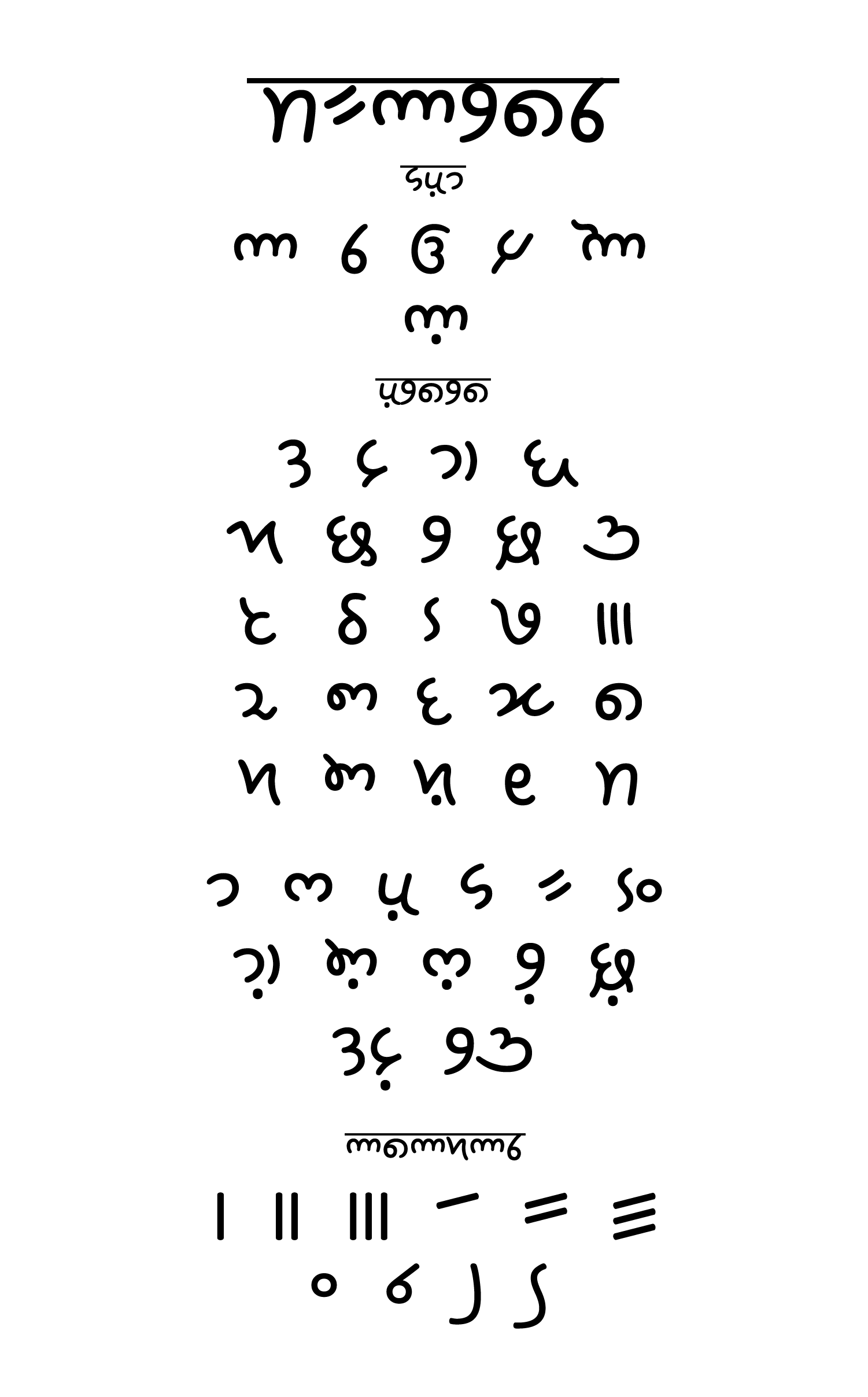
- Mahajani Varnamala chart with the last two rows consisting of Indic fraction symbols
- Script type: Impure Abjad
- Period: 12th century–present
- Direction: Left-to-right
- Region: India, Pakistan
- Languages: Hindi, Punjabi, and Marwari

Related scripts
- Parent systems: Proto-Sinaitic alphabet: Phoenician alphabet; Aramaic alphabet; Brāhmī; Gupta; Śāradā; Landa; Mahajani
- Sister systems: Gurmukhi, Khudabadi, Khojki, Multani

ISO 15924
- ISO 15924: Mahj (314), Mahajani

Unicode
- Unicode alias: Mahajani
- Unicode range: U+11150–U+1117F; Final Accepted Script Proposal

Mahajani is a Laṇḍā mercantile script that was historically used in northern India for writing accounts and financial records in Marwari, Hindi and Punjabi. It is a Brahmic script and is written left-to-right. Mahajani refers to the Hindi word for 'bankers' or 'moneylenders', also known as 'sarrafi' or 'kothival' (merchant).

== Names ==
There are various names for the script based upon region, such as Marwari, Sarafi, Rajasthani, Baniaie, Landa or Mudia/Modiya.

== History ==
Mahajani has been used as a primary accounting script for Marwari traders and for the use of Hindi and Punjabi in a wide region across northwest India and eastern Pakistan. It was taught in merchant schools as part of the education system. A vast majority of documents in which it is found are financial documents, in addition to primers. Its use has been reported by bookkeepers in Haryana as the Langdi script, although its relationship with Langdi is uncertain. Mahajani descended from Landa scripts in the greater Punjab region in historic times and was well known as a merchant's script throughout north India. It may have also been influenced by Kaithi and Devanagari. The script was promoted by the colonial military establishment.

== Characters ==
The word "Mahajani" written in Mahajani script (Long and short vowels are not distinguished).

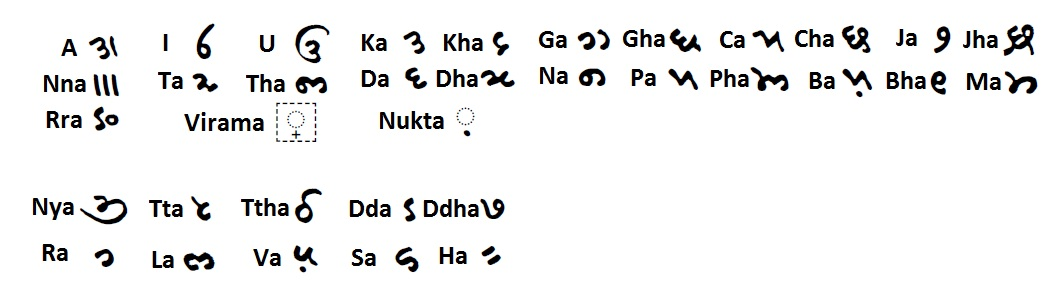
A mahajani alphabet chart with some alternate characters forms

It has fewer vowels than most North Indian scripts, and the use of them is optional. The vowels i and u can represent both their short and long forms in addition to diphthongs and related vowels. Since vowels are optional, they must be interpreted in context for most Mahajani texts. There are no special conjunct consonant forms, and there are no viramas to indicate them. Nasalization, if indicated, is typically represented by 'na'. It also has various fraction marks, accounting marks, and textual organization marks, to indicate paragraph and word spacing, and abbreviation, punctuation, and space marks. As many Mahajani texts are accounting books, accounting symbols have been found, but they are undergoing further research for proper encoding. It also uses a Devanagari-like baseline only to mark title headings on texts, not like in Devanagari where the baseline is an integral part of the characters. Some characters also have glyphic variants, which can be found in greater detail in the Unicode proposal.

=== Vowels ===
𑅐 a, ā IPA: [ɐ], [ɑː]	𑅑 i, ī IPA: [i], [iː]	𑅒 u, ū IPA: [u], [uː]	𑅓 e/ē, ai IPA: [eː], [ɑj]	𑅔 o/ō, au IPA: [oː], [ɑw]

=== Consonants ===
𑅕 ka IPA: [k]	𑅖 kha IPA: [kʰ]	𑅗 ga IPA: [ɡ]	𑅘 gha IPA: [ɡʱ]	
𑅙 ca IPA: [tʃ]	𑅚 cha IPA: [tʃʰ]	𑅛 ja IPA: [dʒ]	𑅜 jha IPA: [dʒʱ]	𑅝 ña IPA: [ɲ]
𑅞 ṭa IPA: [ʈ]	𑅟 ṭha IPA: [ʈʰ]	𑅠 ḍa IPA: [ɖ]	𑅡 ḍha IPA: [ɖʱ]	𑅢 ṇa IPA: [ɳ]
𑅣 ta IPA: [t̪]	𑅤 tha IPA: [t̪ʰ]	𑅥 da IPA: [d̪]	𑅦 dha IPA: [d̪ʱ]	𑅧 na IPA: [n]
𑅨 pa IPA: [p]	𑅩 pha IPA: [pʰ]	𑅪 ba IPA: [b]	𑅫 bha IPA: [bʱ]	𑅬 ma IPA: [m]
𑅭 ra IPA: [r]	𑅮 la IPA: [l]	𑅯 va IPA: [ʋ]	𑅰 sa IPA: [s]	𑅱 ha IPA: [ɦ]

== Unicode ==
Mahajani script was added to the Unicode Standard in June 2014 with the release of version 7.0.

The Unicode block for Mahajani is U+11150–U+1117F:

Mahajani^{[1]}^{[2]} Official Unicode Consortium code chart (PDF)
	0	1	2	3	4	5	6	7	8	9	A	B	C	D	E	F
U+1115x	𑅐	𑅑	𑅒	𑅓	𑅔	𑅕	𑅖	𑅗	𑅘	𑅙	𑅚	𑅛	𑅜	𑅝	𑅞	𑅟
U+1116x	𑅠	𑅡	𑅢	𑅣	𑅤	𑅥	𑅦	𑅧	𑅨	𑅩	𑅪	𑅫	𑅬	𑅭	𑅮	𑅯
U+1117x	𑅰	𑅱	𑅲	𑅳	𑅴	𑅵	𑅶									
Notes 1.As of Unicode version 17.0 2.Grey areas indicate non-assigned code points
