= Christ Church College, Kanpur =

Christ Church College
- Established: 1866; 160 years ago
- Affiliations: Chhatrapati Shahu Ji Maharaj University
- Principal: Dr. Joseph Daniel
- Location: The Mall, Kanpur, Uttar Pradesh; 26.472542°N 80.352352°E
- Campus: Urban
- Website: www.cccknp.ac.in

Christ Church College, Kanpur is a college established in 1866, affiliated with Kanpur University, in Kanpur, Uttar Pradesh, India. Earlier in 1840, SPG Mission School was established to educated Christian students. Later its name turned to present one. It is managed by Church of North India (C.N.I). Agra Diocese, managed by the Christ Church College Society, Kanpur.

== History ==
Christ Church College, Kanpur, the oldest college of the city (1866), carries a historic heritage of supreme educational service and standards. The college began as an S.P.G. Mission school in the 1840s to educate children and those who chose it. First called Mission School, then Christ Church School, it grew into a college affiliated first to the Calcutta University in 1866, then to the Allahabad University in 1892, later to the Agra University in 1927, and last, to the Kanpur University (now the C.S.J.M. University) in 1966.

== Courses ==
The undergraduate and graduate programs offered are:

- Bachelor of Arts
- Master of Arts
- Bachelor of Commerce
- Master of Commerce
- Master of Science
- Bachelor of Science

== Affiliations ==
- 1866 – University of Calcutta
- 1898 – Allahabad University
- 1927 – Agra University
- 1966 – Kanpur University (CSJM)
