= James Meston, 1st Baron Meston =

British civil servant and businessman (1865–1943)

James Scorgie Meston, 1st Baron Meston KCSI VD (12 June 1865 – 7 October 1943), was a prominent British civil servant, financial expert and businessman. He served as Lieutenant-Governor of the United Provinces of Agra and Oudh from 1912 to 1918.

Meston was the younger son of James Meston, of Aberdeen, and his wife Jane (née Scorgie). He was educated at Aberdeen Grammar School and the University of Aberdeen, before passing the Indian civil service examination in 1883. After a short probationary period at Oxford, he was posted to the North-Western Provinces and Oudh in 1885 (which later became the United Provinces of Agra and Oudh), where he was director of land records between 1897 and 1899 and financial secretary to the government between 1899 and 1903. From 1905 to 1906 he briefly left India to act as an adviser to the Cape Colony and Transvaal governments in South Africa.

After his return to India in 1906, Meston was secretary to the finance department of the government of India until 1912, when he was appointed Lieutenant-Governor of the United Provinces of Agra and Oudh. He remained in this position until 1918, when he became finance member of the Viceroy of India's executive council. Problems with his eyesight forced him to resign from this post the following year. In 1917, along with Sir Satyendra Prasanno Sinha and Maharaja Ganga Singh, he assisted the Secretary of State for India in representing India in the Imperial War Cabinet and Conference.

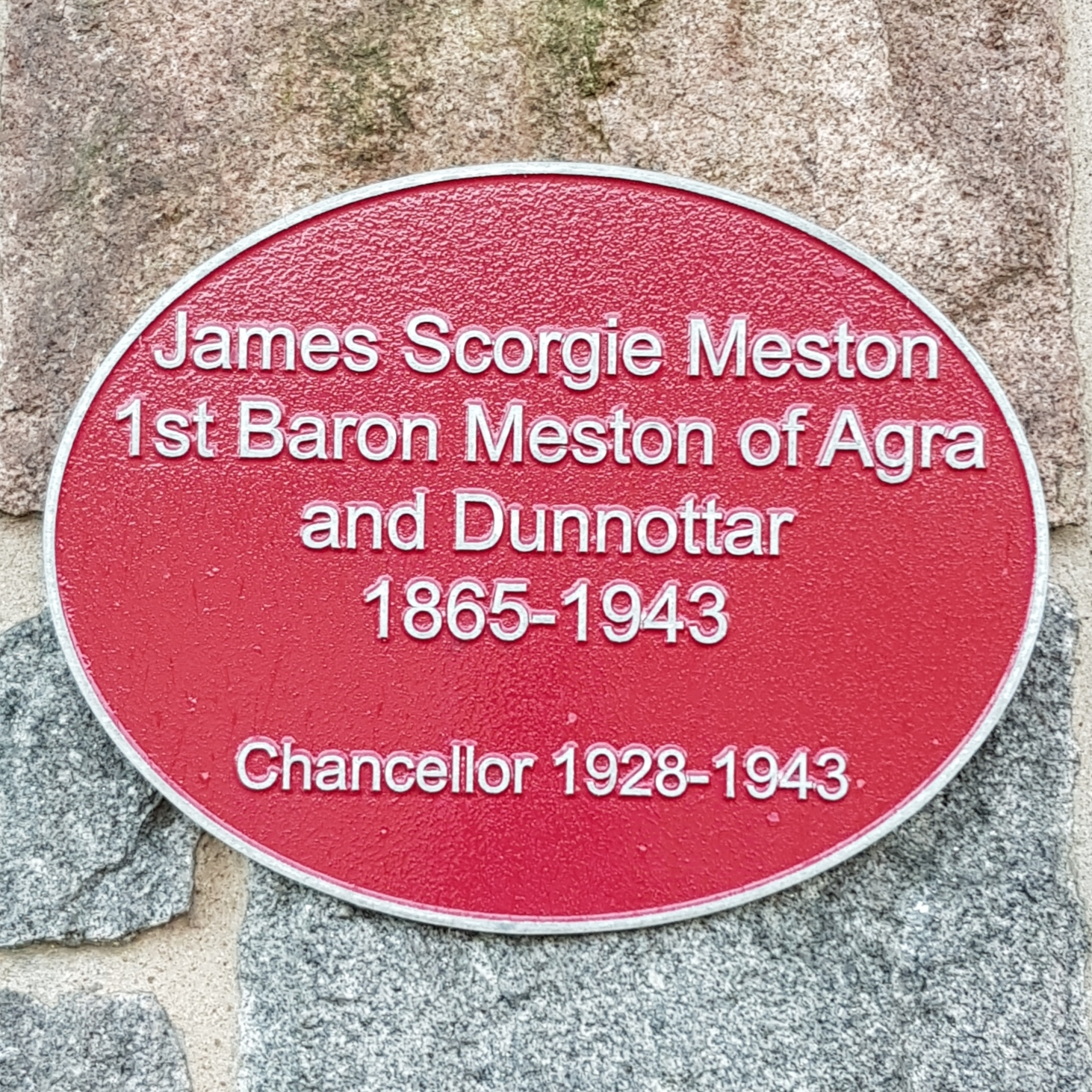
Plaque to James Scorgie Meston on the Meston Building at University of Aberdeen

After the war, Meston, along with Lionel Curtis, was the main designer of the Institute of International Affairs, and served as chairman of its first governing body from 1920 to 1926, of its publications committee and of the editorial board of International Affairs. Apart from this Meston was also vice-chairman of the Supervisory Commission of the League of Nations. He sat on the Liberal benches in the House of Lords and served as President of the Liberal Party organization. He was also involved in business and served as chairman and as a board member of several companies.

Meston was made a CSI in 1908 and a KCSI in 1911 and in 1919 he was further honoured when he was raised to the peerage as Baron Meston, of Agra in the Indian Empire and Dunottar in the County of Kincardine. He served as President of the Royal Statistical Society from 1932 to 1934. He served as President of the Geographical Association in 1934. He received the Scottish Geographical Medal from the Royal Scottish Geographical Society in 1934, presented by the Duke of York.

He married Jeanie, daughter of James McDonald, in 1891. They had two sons, of which the eldest died in childhood. Lord Meston died in October 1943, aged 78, and was succeeded in the barony by his only surviving son Dougall. Lady Meston died in 1946. Meston Road in Kanpur is named in his honour.

Peerage of the United Kingdom
| New creation | Baron Meston; 1919–1943 | Succeeded by Dougall Meston |
Academic offices
| Preceded by The Duke of Richmond and Gordon | Chancellor of the University of Aberdeen; 1928–1943 | Succeeded by The Earl Wavell |
Party political offices
| Preceded by Ramsay Muir | President of the Liberal Party; 1936–1943 | Succeeded by Violet Bonham-Carter |
