= Ganesh Shankar Vidyarthi =

Indian journalist (1890–1931)

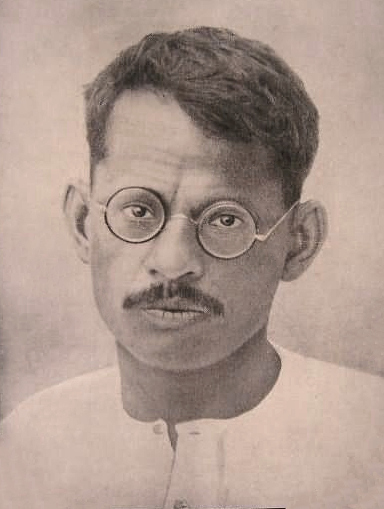
- 1940s portrait
- Born: 26 October 1890; Allahabad, North-Western Provinces, British India
- Died: 25 March 1931 (aged 40); Cawnpore, United Provinces, British India
- Occupations: Journalist, author, writer
- Years active: 1890–1931
- Title: Editor- Pratap (1913–1931)

Ganesh Shankar Vidyarthi (26 October 1890 – 25 March 1931) was an Indian journalist, a leader of the Indian National Congress and an independence movement activist. He was an important figure in the non-cooperation movement and the freedom movement of India, who once translated Victor Hugo's novel Ninety-Three, and is mostly known as the founder-editor of the Hindi language newspaper, Pratap.

== Life ==
Ganesh Shankar was born on 26 October 1890 in a Hindu Kayastha family at Allahabad, the then capital of North-Western Provinces. His father Munshi Jai Narain, also spelled as Jainarayan, was a teacher in a middle school namely Anglo-Vernacular School in Mungaoli which is now the tehsil of Ashoknagar district of Madhya Pradesh. He was poor but a deeply religious Hindu and dedicated to high ideals. It was under him that Ganesh Shankar received his early schooling and passed the high school examination privately in 1907 after studying in Mungaoli and Vidisha. His admission register is available in this school. He could not study further due to poverty and became a clerk in the currency office and later a teacher in high school in Kanpur. At age 16, he also wrote his first book Hamari Atmogsargart and wed his wife Chandraprakashwati Vidyarthi on 4 June 1909.

His real interest, however, was in journalism and public life and he came early under the influence of the nationalist upsurge, which was taking place in the country. He became an agent of the well-known revolutionary Hindi and Urdu journals – Karamyogi and Swarajya and also began to contribute to them. He adopted the pen-name 'Vidyarthi' – the seeker of knowledge. He attracted the notice of Pt. Mahabir Prasad Dwiwedi, the doyen of Hindi journalism who offered him the job of a sub-editor in his famous literary monthly, "The Saraswati", in 1911. Ganesh Shankar, however, was more interested in current affairs and politics and therefore joined the Hindi weekly "Abhyudaya" a political journal of the time. He thus served his apprenticeship under two of the greatest figures in Hindi literature and journalism of the time.

In 1913 Ganesh Shankar came back to Kanpur and launched his career as a crusading journalist and freedom fighter, which was only to end with his death 18 years later. He founded 'Pratap', his famous revolutionary weekly, which identified itself with the cause of the oppressed wherever they might be and Pratap would prove to be widespread as its circulation jumped from five hundred in 1913 to six hundred in 1916. It was through this paper that he waged his famous fights for the oppressed peasants of Rae Bareli, the workers of the Kanpur mills and the downtrodden people of Indian states. During the course of these fights, he had to face numerous prosecutions, pay heavy fines and suffer five prison sentences. On 11 January 1915, he said the following quote:

Now the time has come for our political ideology and our movement no [to] be restricted to the English-educated and to spread among the common people [samanya janta], and for Indian public opinion [lokmat], to be not the opinion of those few educated individuals but to mirror the thoughts of all the classes of the country... the democratic rule is actually the rule of public opinion".

Later on 31 May, he also said:

The much-despised peasants are our true bread-givers [annadata], not those who consider themselves special and look down upon the people who live in toil and poverty as lowly beings

He first met Gandhiji in 1916 in Lucknow and threw himself whole-heartedly in the national movement. He took a leading part in the Home Rule Movement of 1917–18 and led the first strike of textile workers in Kanpur. In 1920 he launched the daily edition of Pratap and it was in this year that he was sentenced to two years rigorous imprisonment for championing the cause of peasants of Rae Bareli. He was released in 1922 and almost immediately sent to jail again, for delivering a "seditious" speech as the President of the Provincial Political Conference at Fatehgarh. In 1924, he met and protested along with Bhagat Singh, who became a close colleague and friend. He would also later associate himself with Chandra Shekhar Azad. Vidyarthi was released in 1924, greatly shattered in health, but he knew no respite and founded a short-lived union and also launched himself in the preparation for the 1925 Congress session at Kanpur presided by Sarojini Naidu.

In 1925, when the Congress decided to contest elections of Provincial Legislative Councils and organized the Swaraj Party, Ganesh Shankar won a resounding victory on its behalf, from Kanpur and served as a Member of the U.P. Legislative Council until 1929 when he resigned at the behest of the Congress. In 1925, after Gandhi founded the Beech Wala Chowk temple in Kanpur, Vidyarthi frequently used it to host meetings. In 1926, Vidyarthi, who was considered an important member of Congress, encouraged Shiv Narayan Tandon to also join Congress. In 1928, he also founded the Mazdur Sabha and led it until his death in 1931. In 1929 he was elected the President of the U.P. Congress Committee and was appointed the first 'dictator' to lead the Satyagrah movement in U.P. He was a supporter of the Hindi language and attended the Hindi Sahitya Sammelan conference in 1930 in Gorakhpur and in March 1930 at Shraddhanand Park in New Delhi. That same year, he was arrested and sent to jail again. He was released on 9 March 1931 under the Gandhi–Irwin Pact.

=== Communalism and death ===
Communalism swept Western Uttar Pradesh in the 1920s as the Shuddhi movement gained steam and Kanpur was no exception. In February 1927, Vidyarthi and other Congress leaders had organized a demonstration to the Moolganj mosque and played music for forty minutes; this was in retaliation to a Muslim mob attacking a musical band accompanying a Hindu marriage procession. Despite, Vidyarthi was known for his secular politics and sympathy for Muslims.

In 1931, Kanpur faced communal rioting. Despite being scheduled to proceed for the Karachi Congress Session, he chose to stay back and rescue the people before felling to the mob. Eyewitnesses note him to have rescued members of both communities; his daughter "stated that her father had successfully rescued some Muslim women but then immediately got involved in rescuing some trapped Hindus, and at this stage he got attacked and killed." His daughter also claimed that the murder was manifested by the colonial government. (Note: Vidyarthi recalls an aunt stating to her that weapons were being distributed in localities days before the riot started and it was said that the ‘Lion of Kanpur’ [Vidyarthi] would be assassinated.) Vidyarthi's disfigured body—showing multiple stab wounds—would only be found a few days later, near litter. Fatehpur's senior journalist Premshankar Awasthi tells that who does not know Amar Shaheed Ganesh Shankar Vidyarti? Those who laid the foundation of Hindu-Muslim unity by sacrificing their lives for communal harmony proved to be an example in the history of Indian journalism. How can the country forget the immortal sacrifice of journalist Siromani Ganesh Shankar Vidyarthi?"

== Legacy ==
Mahatma Gandhi paid him the following tribute in the pages of 'Young India': "The death of Ganesh Shankar Vidyarthi was one to be envied by us all. His blood is the cement that will ultimately bind the two communities. No pact will bind our hearts. But heroism such as Ganesh Shankar Vidyarthi showed is bound in the end to melt the stoniest hearts, melt them into one. The poison has however gone so deep that the blood even of a man so great, so self-sacrificing and so utterly brave as Ganesh Shankar Vidyarthi may today not be enough to wash us of it. Let this noble example stimulate us all to a similar effort should the occasion arise again". Author Siyaramsharan Gupta also made Vidyarthi the subject of the works Atmotsarg Patheya and Mrinmoyee Atmotsarg.

In 2006, there was a controversy involving an unauthorized unveiling of a statue in Mungawali, Madhya Pradesh honoring Vidyarthi by Member of Parliament of INC, Jyotiraditya Madhavrao Scindia. The police and state government claimed it was unauthorized and seized the statue despite local congressman and journalists insisting it be restored. In 2007, journalist Alok Mehta was awarded the Ganesh Shankar Vidyarthi Award by the Makhanlal Chaturvedi National University of Journalism and Communication.

== Personal life ==
Ganesh Shankar Vidyarthi had one son, Hari Shankar Vidyarthi and two grand daughters Srilekha Vidyarthi and Madhulekha Vidyarthi.

== Honors ==
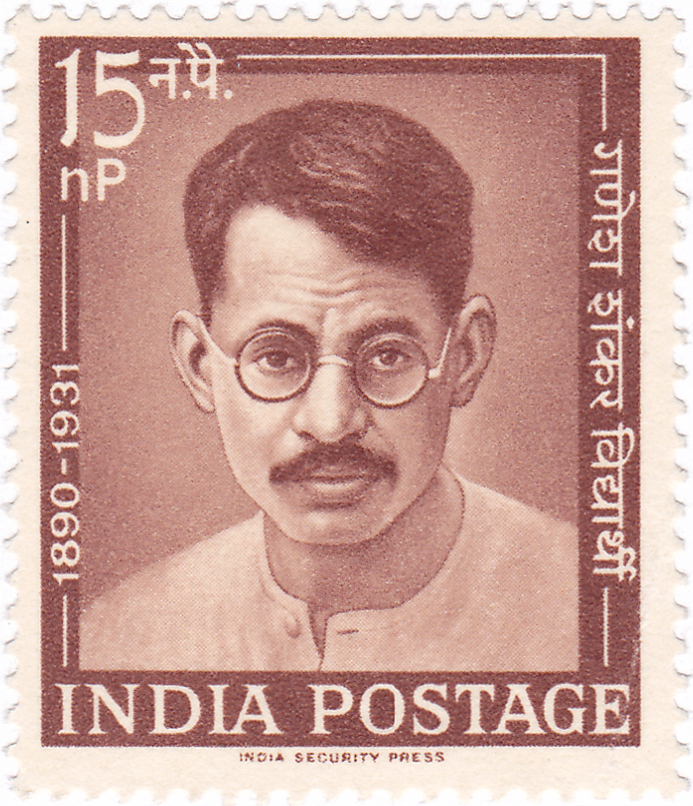
Ganesh Shankar Vidyarthi on a 1962 stamp of India

- Ganesh Shankar Vidyarthi Puraskar is given to renowned journalists by honourable President of India every year from 1989.
- The Ganesh Shankar Vidyarthi Memorial (GSVM) Medical College Kanpur is named in his remembrance.
- Ganesh Chowk, a square is named after him in the heart of the city of Gorakhpur.
- Phool Bagh, earlier Queen's Park in Kanpur is also called as Ganesh Vidyarthi Udyan.
- The Ganesh Shanker Vidyarthi Inter College (GSV Inter College Hathgaon-Fatehpur) is named in his remembrance.
- Ganesh Shankar Vidyarthi Smarak Inter College (GSVS Inter College Maharajganj, UP) is named after his remembrance.
- On 18 July 2017, the Uttar Pradesh government has renamed Kanpur Airport as Ganesh Shankar Vidyarthi Airport to pay respect to his contribution for the independence of India.
