= Nana Rao Park =

Public city park in Kanpur, Uttar Pradesh, India

Coordinates: 26.471044°N 80.360935°E

Nana Rao Park, Kanpur
- Interactive map of Nana Rao Park, Kanpur
- Type: Urban park
- Location: Mall Road, Kanpur, Uttar Pradesh, India
- Operator: Kanpur Municipal Corporation
- Status: Open all year

Nana Rao Park / Company Bagh (Hindi: नाना राव पार्क / कम्पनी बाग़, कानपुर ) is a public city park in Kanpur, the industrial hub of Uttar Pradesh, India, built after Indian independence in honor of Nana Sahib. Prior to Indian Independence the location was known as Memorial Well and commemorated the massacre of British women and children during the Indian Rebellion of 1857.

== History ==
=== Bibighar massacre (1857) ===
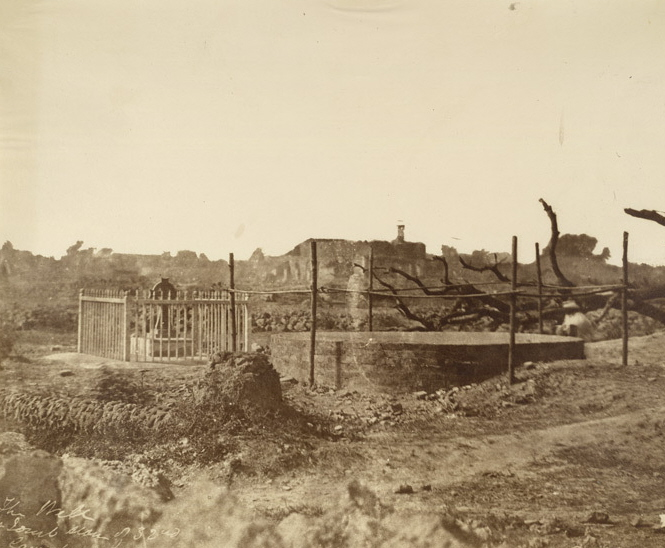
Bibigurh house where European women and children were killed and the well where their bodies were found, 1858.

The park is of immense historical significance as the location of the massacre of around 200 British women and children, allegedly on the instigation of a courtesan in Nana Sahib's court, followed by the punitive actions by British soldiers of the East India Company during the 1857 Indian rebellion.

=== Memorial Well (1858 to 1947) ===
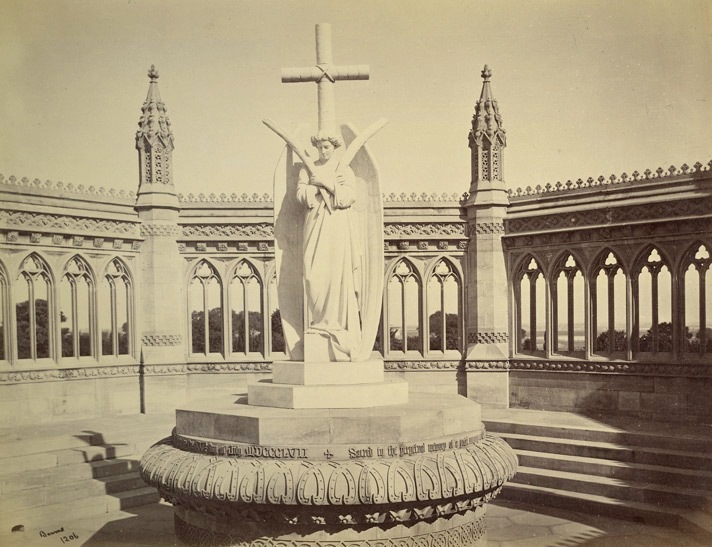
The memorial. Albumen silver print by Samuel Bourne, 1860.

The location was originally called Memorial Well after the memorial was raised to commemorate the dead. The memorial had a large railing, a marble gothic screen with "mournful seraph" and a cross at the site of the well. The inhabitants of Cawnpore were forced to pay £30,000 for the creation of the memorial; this was partially their punishment for not coming to the aid of the women and children.

=== Post Indian independence in 1947 ===
After Indian independence in 1947 the memorial was demolished. A park was built in its place with statues of leaders of the Indian freedom struggle and named in honor of Nana Sahib for his role in the Indian freedom struggle. The marble gothic screen was transferred to the churchyard of the Kanpur Memorial Church. The remains of a circular ridge of the well can still be seen in the park today.

== Nana Rao Park today ==
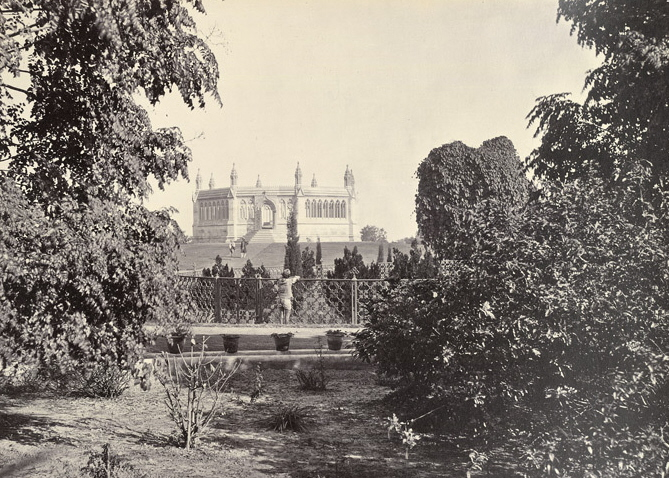
A view across the park to the memorial. Samuel Bourne, 1860.

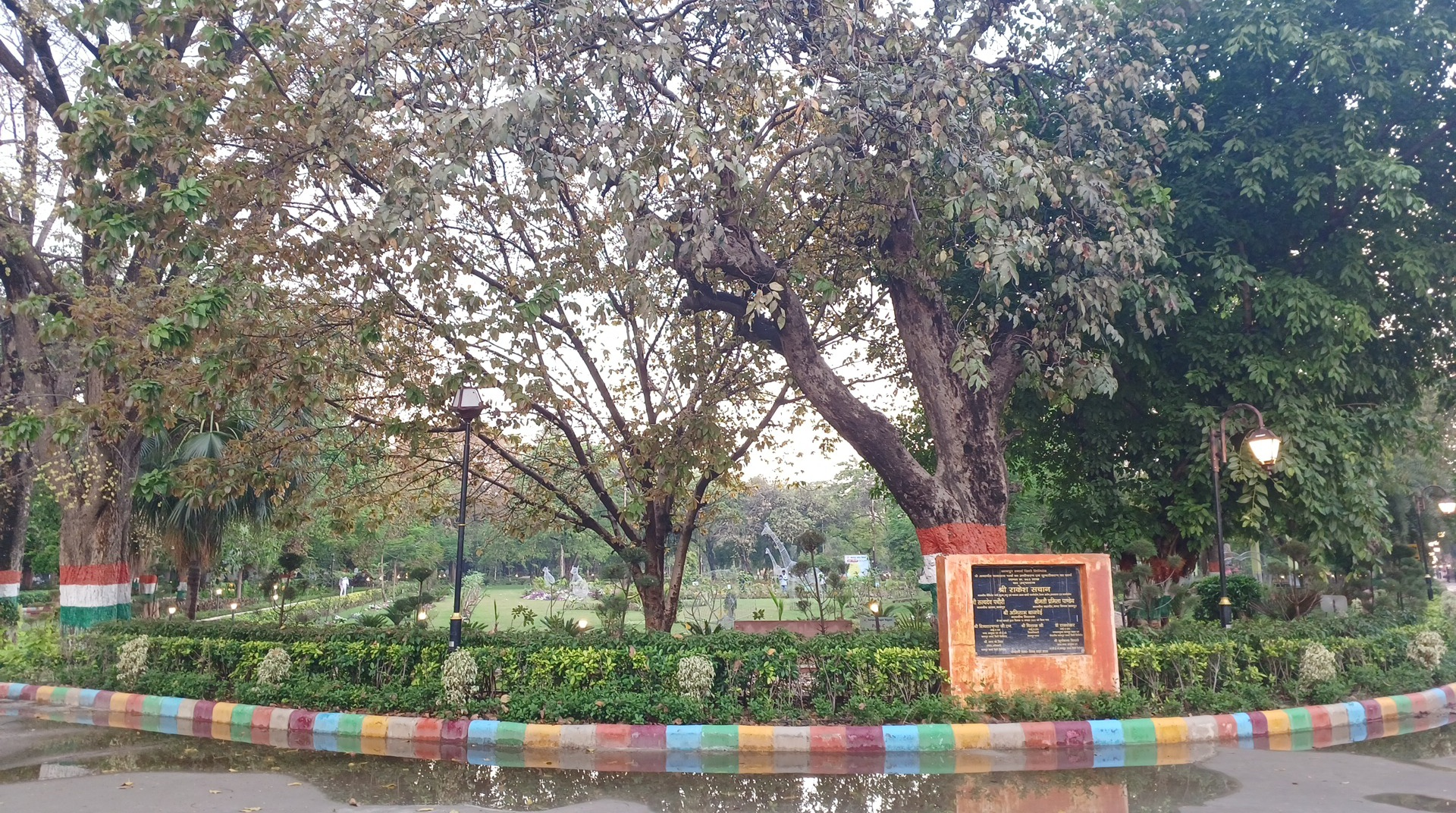
A renovated look of Nana Rao Park with its new newly furnished garden and accessories for children.

The park is located in the central area of Kanpur District and is close to Phool Bagh, LIC Building. The park is well-maintained and is popular with many fitness groups. Presently, the park is one of the favorite Kanpur parks frequented by early morning and evening visitors. For many people in Kanpur, the park serves as an outdoor location for the start of the day. This includes brisk walking, jogging, swimming, badminton and yoga. The park currently is under the charge of Kanpur Municipal Corporation and is well maintained. There is a public swimming pool.

A plant nursery is located inside the park. It has a number of beautiful plants. The park has a lot of greenery. Nana Rao Park is a favorite resting place for many types of local birds and bats.

The park is replete with statues of eminent people who played a part in the Indian independence struggle. The statues include those of Rani Lakshmi Bai, Lala Lajpat Rai, Ajizan Bai & Tatya Tope who is believed to have played a part in the massacre.

Boodhha Bargad, (Hindi: बूढ़ा बरगद, कानपुर ) an old banyan tree, with great historical significance to Indian Independence struggle, is located in the park ground. There is a traditional vyayamshala inside the park.

Since its renovation in 2022, the park now has a beautiful garden and playgrounds filled with swings for children of all ages. With these inclusions, the park now also charges an entry fee of 10 Rupees/per person which grants people access to roam around the entire park and enjoy all its amenities.
