= Langdi =

Script used in the Indian subcontinent

- 'Hariyāṇvī' written in Langdi script
- Script type: Abugida
- Period: ? — 20th century
- Region: Haryana, Delhi
- Languages: Haryanvi, Punjabic languages, and Rajasthani languages

Related scripts
- Parent systems: Proto-Sinaitic alphabet: Phoenician alphabet; Aramaic alphabet; Brāhmī; Gupta; Śāradā; Landa; Mahajani?; Langdi

Langdi, also known as Langdi Hindi, was a script commonly used by traders to write Haryanvi, Punjabi, in the Indian subcontinent. Bookkeepers, known as munīm (Hindi: मुनीम, Urdu: مُنِیم), would also keep records in this script. It remains undocumented.

Some scholars have claimed that Langdi is a form of Mahajani for writing in parts of Haryana. Its proper connection must be more thoroughly explored. It was one of the two main scripts used by merchants in northwest India, the other being Mundi.
