= Naveen Market =

Popular market in Kanpur, India

Naveen Market (Hindi:नवीन मार्केट; Urdu:نویں مارکیٹ), earlier King's Market (during British rule) is one of the most popular markets in the Indian city of Kanpur. The market is situated in the North Central region of Kanpur city and is the most expensive market in the city with leather, garments, perfumes and jewellery shops as main attractions. The famous "The Landmark Hotel" and Som Dutt Plaza are situated near Naveen Market. The shops at the market are all of same colour and are situated inside old colonial buildings. Naveen Market along with PPN Market adjacent to it is the example of modern and planned market.

== History ==
Naveen Market was previously known as 'Refugee Market'. When refugees from Punjab came to Delhi, in the aftermath of partition in 1947, they found the city in murderous riots. So, many of them continued further East to make Kanpur their home. They were provided with small houses in a suburban locality, aptly named “Lajpat Nagar”, and small wooden kiosks in a market in the heart of the city. With their industry, the refugees turned it into the posh Naveen Market and Lajpat Nagar had become a colony of rich houses by 1970s.

== Developments ==
The government has developed a multilevel parking near Naveen Market on either side of Mall Road which is to be connected through a subway to Naveen Market and a pedestrian overpass which shall have escalators and elevators. Naveen Market is in the phase of major renovation currently as there has been provision of setting up benches and high quality street lights along with other beautification works.

== Incidents and accidents ==
- On October 2, 2015 fire broke out at a restaurant building due to short circuit and a crockery store burned down
