= Ursula Horsman Memorial Hospital =

Ursula Horsman Hospital
- Type: Public
- Established: 1937
- Endowment: ₹11.24 billion (US$120 million) per annum
- President: Minister for Health and Family Welfare, Government of India
- Academic staff: 1250
- Administrative staff: 510
- Undergraduates: 12
- Postgraduates: 46
- Location: Kanpur, Uttar Pradesh, India
- Nickname: UHM Hospital or Ursula Hospital

Ursula Horsman Memorial Hospital (UHM Hospital) or Ursula Hospital is a government hospital situated at Meston Road in the Indian city of Kanpur. Founded on 26 February 1937, the hospital was named after Albert Francis Horsman's wife, Ursula Horsman, who had died in an aircraft accident approaching Alexandria in 1935.

Sir Henry Horsman, MC, (brother to Albert Horsman), a prominent industrialist, co-founder of Swadeshi Mills and President of the Chamber of Commerce for Upper India for many years, established another large hospital in the memory of his mother, the Alice Horsman Memorial Hospital and Dufferin Hospital. Both hospitals, together with a third built in Sir Henry Horsman's memory, are still used as government hospitals in Kanpur.

As one of the largest district hospital in the industrial city of Kanpur, it serves a large population for their primary and specialized medical care needs. As a function of being a government funded setup, it is often overcrowded and underfunded. Despite these limitations it has more than 12 fully functional clinical and diagnostic departments that provide outpatient and inpatient services to a large population including a 24-hour emergency service.

UHM Hospital is also an approved medical training facility, providing Internship training as well as post-graduate training in a limited number of specialties. It is an institute involved in academic research with many studies being published in indexed medical journals. The training programs have been historically affected by poor staffing structure, a poor infrastructure, and reports of dysfunctional and inefficient administrative structure and corruption.

In 2010, a five-story private ward was added to the hospital.

== Role during Covid-19 Pandemic (2020-2021) ==
In 2020, UHM Hospital played a pivotal role during the Covid-19 pandemic by coordinating mass testing and operating negative pressure isolation wards for those affected by the infection. It was one of the largest testing facilities approved by the Indian Council of Medical Research. It was one of the largest hospital repurposed to only Covid-19 treatment and care and treated a large number of patients.

There were reports of corruption within its testing staff, who allegedly doctored Covid-19 test reports. This came as a major embarrassment to the institution, as the sting operation exposing the wrongdoing was made public.

The hospital continued to grapple with challenges including poor availability of oxygen supply for Covid-19 patients, intermittent supply of necessary medications, and lack of support from the establishment in managing the bodies of those deceased from the Covid-19.
