= Phool Bagh =

Urban city park in North India

Coordinates: 26.467308°N 80.360248°E

- Ganesh Shankar Vidyarthi Udyan
- Interactive map of Phool Bagh
- Type: Urban park
- Location: The Mall, Kanpur, Uttar Pradesh, India
- Created: 1999
- Operator: Kanpur Municipal Corporation
- Status: Open all year

Ganesh Shankar Vidyarthi Udyan / Phool Bagh (Hindi: गणेश शंकर विद्यार्थी उद्यान / फूल बाग़, कानपुर ), earlier Queen's Park, is an urban city park in Kanpur, the industrial hub of Uttar Pradesh in North India. It has been the location for many public meetings and political rallies in Kanpur from the early twentieth century.

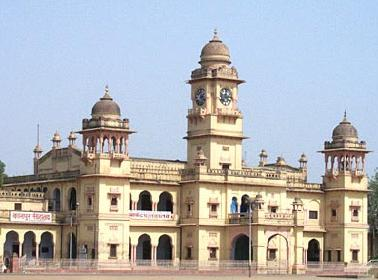
Kanpur Sangrahalaya

== Importance ==
The original greenery of the park has been restored after local Development Authority leased the park on BOOT basis to private developer.

== History ==
Queen's Park first opened in 1887, during the reign of Queen Victoria in Britain.

King Edward ruled Britain from 1901 to 1910. In 1876, as the Prince of Wales, he had been the first British royal prince to visit India on a state visit, after the control of India passed from the East India Company to the British Crown. During this trip to India, he had visited Kanpur as well.

=== Gandhi Bhawan ===
European merchants who had settled in Cawnpore, felt the need for a European style amusement center in Cawnpore.

On the death of King Edward in Britain, the hall was initially established as a memorial to commemorate his 1876 visit to Cawnpore and was named as K. E. M Hall. The funds for the park were collected from European traders settled in Kanpur and Indian merchants.

The K.E.M. (King Edward Memorial) Hall was initially planned as a wooden dancing floor for Western style, ball room dancing. Due to outbreak of World War I in 1914, construction of the hall was interrupted. There was a regular hospital in Kanpur Cantonment for soldiers injured in the World War. As the facilities in this hospital were not adequate, the K.E.M. Hall was temporarily used to house wounded World War I British soldiers in the temporary hospital inside KEM Hall.

The hall construction was completed after the end of World War I in 1918. It was used by European settlers in India for cultural activities. Occasionally it was rented to rich Indian merchants for marriage ceremonies.

After independence in 1947, KEM Hall was renamed as Gandhi Bhawan. A part of this Gandhi Bhawan now houses a Municipal library and the Kanpur Sangrahalaya / Kanpur Museum.

== Location ==
The park is located in the central area of Kanpur city and is close to right bank of river Ganga, Kanpur Central railway station, LIC Building and Nana Rao Park.

== Attractions ==
- Kanpur Sangrahalaya ( Kanpur Museum ) is located in the park ground.
- Cawnpore Union Club is located inside the precincts.
- A water pumping station supplying drinking water to Kanpur residents is located inside the grounds.
- An enclosed sewage dumping ground has been created inside the park by the Kanpur Municipal Corporation authorities.
- It is located close to Nana Rao Park.

== Historical awareness ==
People like Mahatma Gandhi, Indira Gandhi, Ram Manohar Lohia, Atal Bihari Vajpayee have given public speeches inside this park.
