= Mahajani (Unicode block) =

- Range: U+11150..U+1117F (48 code points)
- Plane: SMP
- Scripts: Mahajani
- Assigned: 39 code points
- Unused: 9 reserved code points

Unicode version history
- 7.0 (2014): 39 (+39)

Unicode documentation
- Code chart ∣ Web page

Mahajani is a Unicode block containing characters historically used for writing Punjabi and Marwari.

Mahajani^{[1]}^{[2]} Official Unicode Consortium code chart (PDF)
	0	1	2	3	4	5	6	7	8	9	A	B	C	D	E	F
U+1115x	𑅐	𑅑	𑅒	𑅓	𑅔	𑅕	𑅖	𑅗	𑅘	𑅙	𑅚	𑅛	𑅜	𑅝	𑅞	𑅟
U+1116x	𑅠	𑅡	𑅢	𑅣	𑅤	𑅥	𑅦	𑅧	𑅨	𑅩	𑅪	𑅫	𑅬	𑅭	𑅮	𑅯
U+1117x	𑅰	𑅱	𑅲	𑅳	𑅴	𑅵	𑅶									
Notes: 1. As of Unicode version 16.0; 2. Grey areas indicate non-assigned code points

== History ==
The following Unicode-related documents record the purpose and process of defining specific characters in the Mahajani block:

Version	Final code points (Note: Proposed code points and characters names may differ from final code points and names)	Count	L2 ID	WG2 ID	Document
7.0	U+11150..11176	39	L2/10-377	N3930	Pandey, Anshuman (2010-10-06), Preliminary proposal to encode Mahajani in ISO/IEC 10646
7.0	U+11150..11176	39	L2/10-440		Anderson, Deborah; McGowan, Rick; Whistler, Ken (2010-10-27), "7. Mahajani", Review of Indic-related L2 documents and Recommendations to the UTC
7.0	U+11150..11176	39	L2/11-274	N4126	Pandey, Anshuman (2011-07-12), Proposal to Encode the Mahajani Script in ISO/IEC 10646
7.0	U+11150..11176	39	L2/11-298		Anderson, Deborah; McGowan, Rick; Whistler, Ken (2011-07-27), "2. Mahajani", South Asian subcommittee report
7.0	U+11150..11176	39	L2/11-261R2		Moore, Lisa (2011-08-16), "D.3", UTC #128 / L2 #225 Minutes
7.0	U+11150..11176	39	L2/11-330	N4181	Anderson, Deborah (2011-11-04), Proposed Additions to ISO/IEC 10646
7.0	U+11150..11176	39		N4253 (pdf, doc)	"M59.08", Unconfirmed minutes of WG 2 meeting 59, 2012-09-12
