= Som Dutt Plaza =

Coordinates: 26.47404°N 80.347899°E

Som Dutt Plaza is a Non-AC Mall (marketing complex) situated adjacent to Naveen Market along the famous Mall Road in the city of Kanpur nagar, Uttar Pradesh. It shares the same complex with Hotel Landmark.It is popularly known for electronic gadgets.
