= Portuguese Cemetery, Kanpur =

Portuguese cemetery in Kanpur, India

Coordinates: 26.47897°N 80.35181°E

Portuguese Cemetery
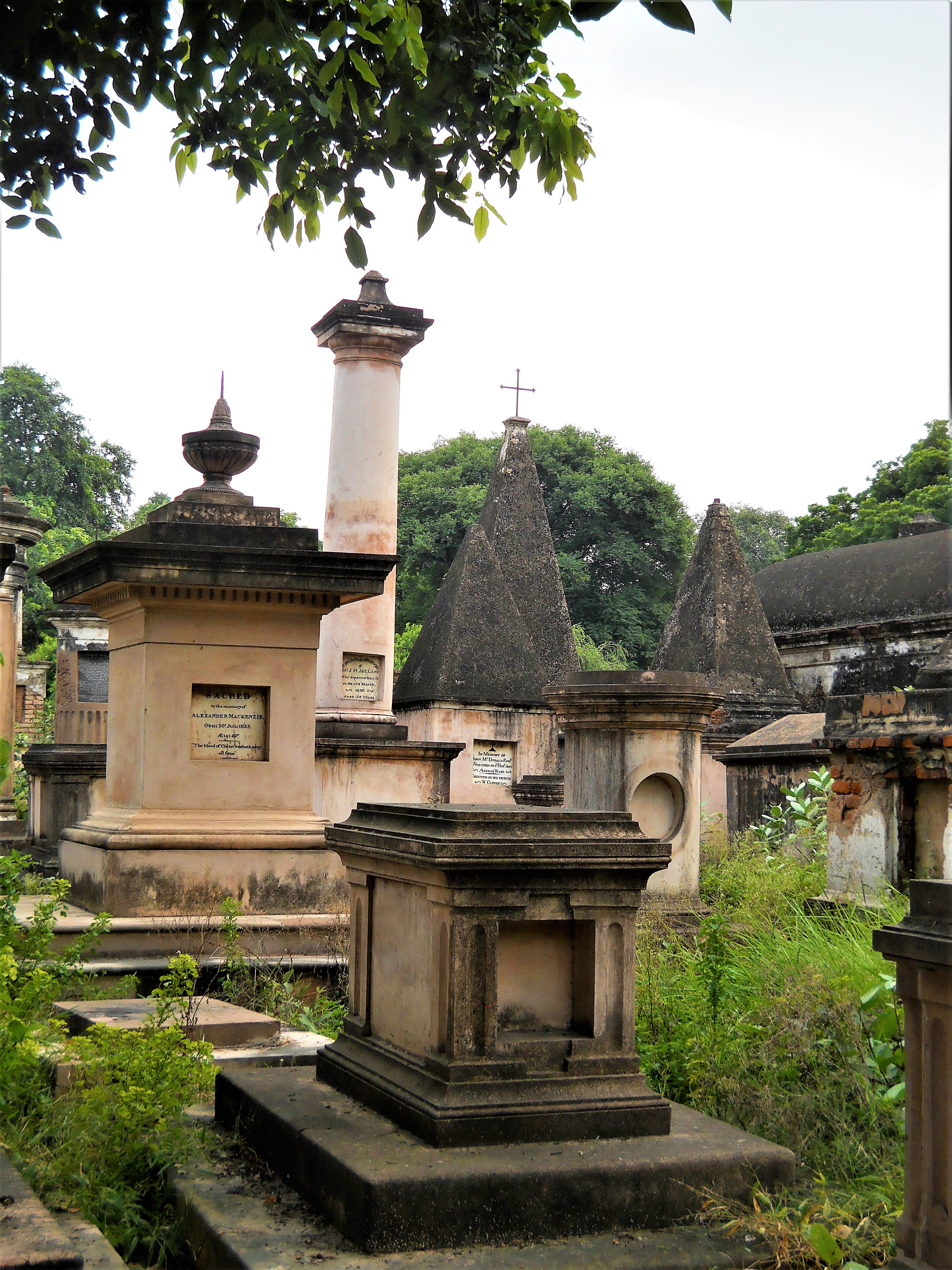
- Portuguese Cemetery, Kanpur
- Interactive map of Portuguese Cemetery

Details
- Established: 1781; 245 years ago
- Location: VIP Road, Kanpur
- Country: India
- Style: The tombs are an admixture of the Gothic with a rich flavour of the Indo-Saracenic style. Of the latter, mention may be made of a unique and composite brick structure built in the ‘panchyatana’ manner, with a central dome flanked by miniature replicas of Orissan ‘rekha deul’ on four sides. Coupled with this peculiarity, the black basalt carvings on the frontal façade indicate a distinct respect for the Hindu faith.
- Owned by: Archaeological Survey of India
- No. of graves: 1200 graves or tombs

Portuguese Cemetery, also known as Gora Kabristan or Kacheri Cemetery, is a cemetery located on VIP Road, Kanpur, India. The road used to be called Amherst Street and still houses many government offices and residential bungalows.

== History ==
In the 1760s, some traders had settled at Kanpur, including some Portuguese. The first British troops arrived around 1770, and Kanpur rapidly became a major garrison town. The foundation stone of the cemetery was laid in 1781 when Lieutenant Colonel John Stephen died in the city. The grave of Stephen is considered to be the oldest grave in the cemetery. The British Association for Cemeteries in South Asia has been providing financial aid to the cemetery since 1977.
