= Ganesh Shankar Vidyarthi Puraskar =

Journalism award

- Native name: गणेश शंकर विद्यार्थी पुरस्कार
- Description: Annual journalism award recognizing outstanding contributions to Hindi journalism and mass communication
- Country: India

Ganesh Shankar Vidyarthi Puraskar is an annual journalism award given by the President of India. It was first granted in 1989.

The award was instituted in the memory of Indian journalist and politician Ganesh Shankar Vidyarthi, who was killed during a riot in Kanpur.
