= VIP Road, Kanpur =

Major arterial road in Kanpur, India

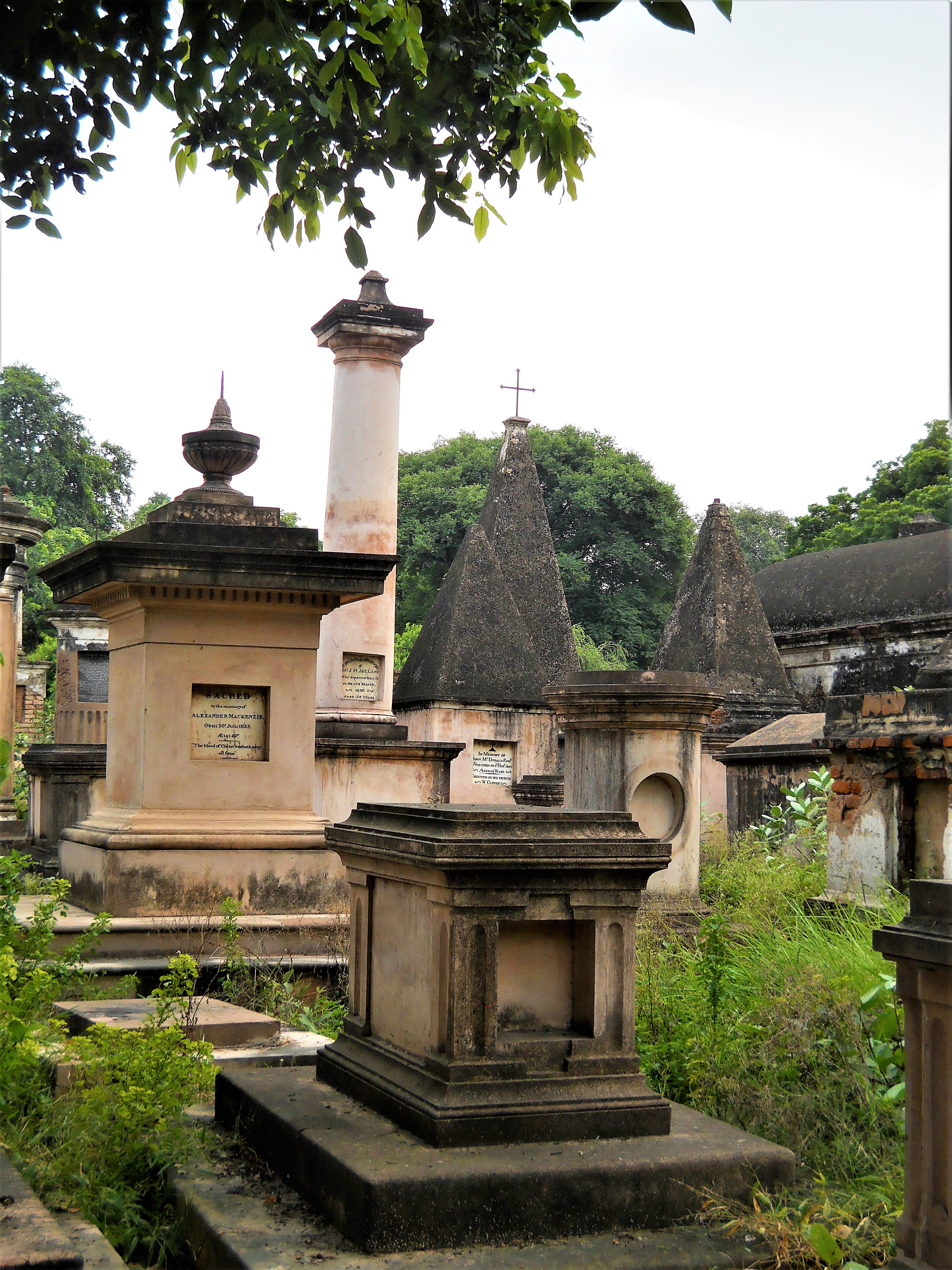
Portuguese Cemetery near VIP Road famous for its more than 800 graves

VIP Road or Parwati Bagla Road (formerly Amherst Street) is a major arterial road in Kanpur, India. It connects Meghdoot Trisection at Mall Road with Grand Trunk Road at Rawatpur. The road has tall, decorated walls on both of its sides. The road houses the bungalows of government officials of the city, including the District Magistrate of Kanpur District. Elgin Mills, which is the first cotton mill in Kanpur, is situated on this road. Chandra Shekhar Azad University of Agriculture and Technology, is also present here. Uttar Pradesh Textile Technology Institute built in 1914 is also situated on this road. UP Stock Exchange, Green Park Stadium, Merchants Chamber Hall of Uttar Pradesh, The Georgina McRobert Memorial Hospital and DAV College are also located on this road at Woolmer Crossing.
