= Birhana Road, Kanpur =

Commercial centre in India

Birhana Road is an important commercial street in Kanpur, India. Birhana Road is the nerve centre of the retail jewellery trade, and has the largest concentration of jewellers in Kanpur.
