= Bisati =

Muslim community in North India

Regions with significant populations
- India and Pakistan

Languages
- • Urdu • Hindi

Religion
- Islam

The Bisati are a Muslim community, found in North India. Many members of this community migrated to Pakistan around the partition of India in 1947 and have settled in Karachi and elsewhere in Sindh.

== See also ==
- Siddiqui
- Shaikhs in South Asia
