= Kanpur Sangrahalaya =

Kanpur Sangrahalaya (King Edward Memorial Hall)
- कानपुर पुरातत्व संग्रहालय; کانپور آثار قدیمہ میوزیم
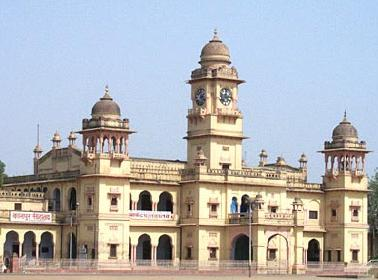

- Location within Uttar Pradesh
- Established: 1999
- Location: Phool Bagh Grounds, Kanpur, India
- Coordinates: 26.4668°N 80.3622°E
- Type: Museum

Kanpur Sangrahalaya (Hindi: कानपुर पुरातत्व संग्रहालय), also known as Kanpur Museum, is the official museum in Kanpur, the industrial hub of Uttar Pradesh, India. It was built by the British as King Edward Memorial Hall in honour of Edward VII. It is a storehouse of artifacts and exhibits that tell the story of the events and people who have influenced the making of Kanpur city, and tell many interesting details about the historical past of the city.

== History ==
Cawnpore, or Kanpur, was known as the Manchester of Asia, in the British colonial period.

European merchants who had settled in Cawnpore, felt the need for European-style amusement, so construction began on a hall for western style, ballroom dancing. On the death of King Edward in 1910, the hall was established as a memorial to commemorate his 1876 visit to Cawnpore, and was named as King Edward Memorial (KEM) Hall. The funds for the park were collected from European traders settled in Kanpur and Indian merchants.

When World War I broke out, construction on the hall was interrupted and the hall was used to house wounded British soldiers. After the war, KEM Hall was an orthopedic rehabilitation hospital. and became Harcourt Butler Technological Institute in 1920.

Construction of the hall was completed after WWI in 1918. It was used by European settlers for cultural activities, and occasionally it was rented to rich Indian merchants for marriage ceremonies.

After independence in 1947, KEM Hall was renamed as Gandhi Bhawan. Gandhi Bhawan now houses a municipal library and the Kanpur Sangrahalaya Museum.

The museum was established in 1999, and is located in Phool Bagh Ground at the intersection of Mall Road and the Kanpur-Lucknow Road. The museum's collection includes an old colonial period artillery gun.
