= Becon Ganj =

Area of Kanpur, India

Becon Ganj (Hindi: बेकन गंज, Urdu: بیکن گنج) is a residential and commercial area situated in the central of Kanpur in the Indian state of Uttar Pradesh. The locality is named after British magistrate of Kanpur in 1828 named William Bacon. One of the oldest parts of Kanpur, Becon Ganj was known for its Big Market, narrow streets and old buildings some of which were demolished in the 1990s to build commercial structures.

The Becon Ganj has a very huge market has operated since the time of Britisher's in India. It comes under Arya Nagar Assembly, and near about population is 1,00,000-2,00,000 Lakh.

Becon Ganj has a police station in middle of this area nearby Dada Miyan Chauraha, Sultan Hotel Road established from the British Period at large area.

== Becon Ganj Market ==
Becon Ganj has very old market since the British ruled India. This market covers near about 1–2 km area. Sultan Warsi Jewellers is most popular jewellery shop in Bazar.

== Shops ==
Shops sell male & female wear like (pant, shirt, coat, trouser, T-shirt, jeans, kurta, salwar, dupatta, Naqab), ornaments, jewelry, fashion garments, fancy dresses, footwear, and other such apparel. Most products are locally produced. A special attraction is Wednesday, Friday & Sunday footpath market. On Monday market is closed.
