= Meston Road, Kanpur =

Meston Road is a commercial street in city of Kanpur in India. The road is named after James Meston, Lieutenant Governor of the United Provinces of Agra and Oudh from 1912 to 1918 and was later, in 1919 a signatory of the Treaty of Versailles on behalf of British India along with Sir Satyendra Prasanno Sinha. Meston Road also known as 'gun bazaar' (Gun Market) is the centre of arms and ammunition shops in Kanpur.

== History ==
Meston Road has an important association with the Independence struggle. It is the centre of Congress. Tilak Hall is situated in the bylanes of Meston Road.

Meston Road was opened to public in the year 1913.

Kanpur Mosque Incident

In 1913, Machhli Bazaar Mosque situated on Meston Road was demolished by rioters during Hindu-Muslim riots. In April 1913, Islamic scholars and eminent Muslims moved a petition through Barrister Shahid Hussain to Lt. Governor of U.P. Sir James Meston to prove that the targeted portion was the part and parcel of the mosque from religious point of view. On 6 May 1913, Meston in a letter to the petitioners concluded that the place was not the part of the mosque and must be removed. On 20 July 1913, Meston himself visited Kanpur and inspected the mosque. He exhibited complete disregard to the feelings of Muslims and the authorities abolished the Eastern part of the mosque. The action sparked off an outrage among the Muslims and condemned throughout India. On 3 August, irate Muslims gathered at Idgah and proceeded to mosque with black flags. They began to place the loose bricks over the dismantle structure as a symbol of reconstruction. As the Muslims gathered at the place where the eastern part of the mosque once stood the British Magistrate of Kanpur My.Taylor ordered them to dispense. Failing to do so Taylor ordered his troops of police to fire. 600 cartridges were fired over 15 minutes on unarmed civilians. This was a gory event that was denounce as being “Stupid Blunder” by the then Governor General Lord Hardinge. Lord Hardinge himself visited the mosque and offered condolences. He even ordered for the removal of prisoners.

1931 Communal Riots of Kanpur

In March 1931, the riots broke out again between Hindu congressmen who urged a 'hartal' (protest) and Muslim shopkeepers who objected to closing of their shops. This led to riots for several days in the city witnessed by many including V.M Kuruvilla of RAF.

Now the place is the epitome of communal harmony as the 'Beech Wala Mandir' is situated next to a mosque. Both religious places came up several years ago and have withstood several riots. But, both continue to complement each other and are amongst a few places where Hindus and Muslims work and pray together.

== Landmarks ==
- Tilak Hall-Tilak Hall, situated on Meston Road, was inaugurated by Mahatma Gandhi on 24 July 1934. Its foundation was laid by Jawahar Lal Nehru in 1931. The building was the head office of the Congress party.
- Cawnpore Kotwali-The Police Headquarters of Kanpur. This is one of the few British Raj era buildings in Kanpur where one can still see the old name of Kanpur as Cawnpore.
- Premchand's House- The rented house of great writer of Hindi and Urdu novels stayed here from 1905 to 1909.
- Jain Glass Temple
- Machhli Bazaar Mosque
- Beech Wala Mandir
- Agrasen Smriti Bhawan
- Umbrella Shops
