= Maulvi Liaquat Ali =

Leader of the Sepoy Mutiny, India (1817–1892)

- Born: 1817; Allahabad (Prayagraj), Uttar Pradesh
- Died: 17 May 1892 (aged 74–75); Yangon, Myanmar
- Occupation: Religious leader

Maulvi Liaquat Ali (1817-1892) was a Muslim religious leader from village Mahgaon, near Allahabad (Prayagraj), now Kaushambi district, in the state of Uttar Pradesh in present-day India. He was one of the leaders in the revolt against the British in 1857, in what is now known as the Indian Rebellion of 1857. As one of the most prominent leaders, Maulvi Liaqat Ali belonged to Village Mahgaon in Pargana Chail of District Kaushambi. He was a religious teacher, an upright pious Muslim, and a man of great courage and valour. His family traced their descent from the Jafri branch of Hashmis which had their offshoots at Jaunpur and Phulwari Sharif, Patna. He was a humble and simple man but when he took the reins of the freedom struggle, he became a dreadful enemy of the British.

The Zamindars of Chail were his relatives and followers who supported Maulvi with their men and ammunition. Consequently, it was with great difficulty that the British regained control of the city of Allahabad after the Maulvi captured the Khusro Bagh and declared the independence of India Khusro Bagh became the headquarters of the sepoys under Ali who took charge as the Governor of liberated Allahabad. however, the Mutiny was swiftly put down and Khusro Bagh was retaken by the British in two weeks. He escaped from Allahabad with a few friends and rebel sepoys after the British recaptured the city, but was caught after 14 years in September 1871 at Byculla railway station in Mumbai. He was tried and sentenced to death, but died in captivity in Rangoon (Yangon) on 17 May 1892. He had married and had a daughter, Amtullah Bibi. Her descendants are still found in and around Pargana Chail though some migrated to Pakistan after independence.

Amelia Horne (also known as Amy Horne and Amelia Bennett) was a 17-year-old survivor of the Siege of Cawnpore. She was a witness for the 1872 trial of Liaquat Ali and was presented in Ali's defence as he saved her life. Ali was sentenced to life in prison at the Cellular Jail in the Andaman Islands.
