= Eliza Fanthome =

Eliza Fanthome (born 1845) was a British woman best known for surviving the Indian Rebellion of 1857 as a girl.

== Life ==
Eliza Fanthome was born to the Christian Anglo-French district clerk James Fanthome.

In 1857, she experienced the Siege of Cawnpore. During the Satichaura Ghat massacre, she was abducted by a private individual. Being the captive of a private individual, she avoided the Bibighar massacre. She later testified that she was held as a slave by the Muslim Meerun Jan, who subjected her to rape and forced her to live as his slave, ioundee, and that she was forced to cook for him and wash the feet of his several wives. She also testified that he forced her to live with the brother of one Meanjon Syed for about one year.

The British freed Eliza Fanthome from slavery by hiring two informers to rescue her from the rebel camp where she was being held, a task they succeeded in. Meerun Jan was never captured by the British, but Meanjon Syed was sentenced for complicity to fourteen years of deportation to the Andamans.

She was one of a few survivors of the Satichaura Ghat massacre. A handful of women were taken prisoner by individual captors, avoided being placed in the Bibighar, and therefore also avoided the Bibighar massacre. Of these known survivors were Ulrica Wheeler, Amelia Horne, the drummers wives Eliza Bradshaw and Elizabeth Letts, and Eliza Fanthome, who was twelve years old at the time.

== Legacy ==
In 1896, J.F. Fanthome published the novel Mariam: A Story of the Indian Mutiny of 1857 about a Christian woman, Mariam, and her daughter Ruth, during the rebellion. He claimed the story was based on the notes of Ruth and that he had not published the novel until after the death of Mariam in 1892. The novel was likely based on the story of Eliza Fanthome: J.F. Fanthome was married to Winifred, daughter of Marie Le Maistre, who died in 1892, and was the paternal aunt of Eliza Fanthome.

The novel Mariam: A Story of the Indian Mutiny of 1857 was the basis of Ruskin Bond's A Flight of Pigeons, who in turn was the inspiration for the Hindi film Junoon (1978).
