= Amelia Horne =

British writer 1839 - 1921

Amelia Horne also known as Amy Haines and Amelia Bennett (1839–1921) was a British memoir writer. She is known for her memoirs describing her experiences as a survivor of the Siege of Cawnpore during the Indian Rebellion of 1857, having been taken captive by a sowar during the Satichaura Ghat massacre, thereby avoiding the Bibighar massacre.

== Life ==
Amelia Horne was born in Calcutta as the daughter of the British master mariner Frederick Horne and Emma Horne. When her mother remarried, she became the stepdaughter of John Hampden Cook.

She experienced the Siege of Cawnpore with her mother and stepfather. During the Satichaura Ghat massacre, she was abducted by a sowar, who took her as his captive wife. Being the private captive of the Sowar, she avoided the Bibighar massacre.

She was eventually released by the sowar, who allowed her to return to her family in Calcutta. She married the railway official William Bennett (d. 1877).

In 1872, she testified in court in Lucknow in favor of Maulvi Liaquat Ali. She testified that he had saved her during the Satichaura Ghat massacre.

Amelia Horne was one of few survivors of the Satichaura Ghat massacre. A handful of women were taken prisoner by individual captors, avoided to be placed in the Bibighar and therefore avoided also the Bibighar massacre. Of these known survivors were Ulrica Wheeler, Amelia Horne, the drummers' wives Eliza Bradshaw and Elizabeth Letts, and the twelve-year-old Eliza Fanthome.

== Legacy ==
Amelia Horne was the author of two memoirs describing her experiences during the Rebellion. She published her first memoir in 1858 under the name Mrs Amy Haines. Her second memoir was published in The Nineteenth Century and After 1913 under the name Amelia Bennett.
