= The Steam House =

1880 novel by Jules Verne

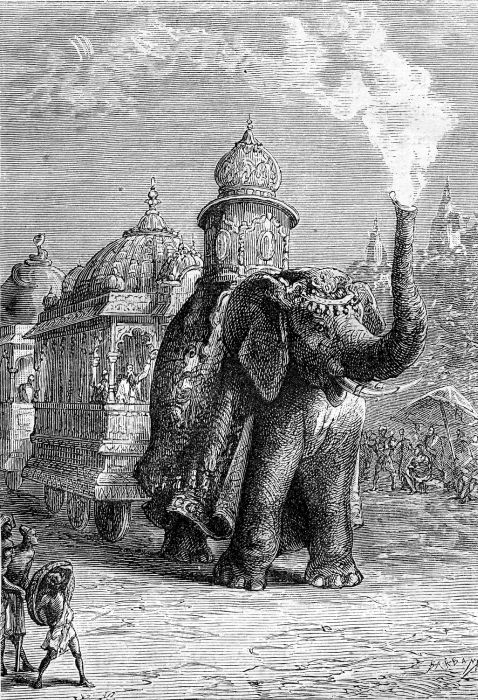
- Author: Jules Verne
- Original title: La Maison à vapeur
- Illustrator: Léon Benett
- Language: French
- Series: The Extraordinary Voyages #20
- Genre: Adventure novel, Science fiction
- Publisher: Pierre-Jules Hetzel
- Publication date: 1880
- Publication place: France
- English publication date: 1880
- Media type: Print (Hardback)
- OCLC: 2653988
- Preceded by: Tribulations of a Chinaman in China
- Followed by: The Giant Raft

The Steam House (French: La maison à vapeur) is an 1880 Jules Verne novel recounting the travels of a group of British colonists in the Raj in a wheeled house pulled by a steam-powered mechanical elephant. Verne uses the mechanical house as a plot device to have the reader travel in nineteenth-century India. The descriptions are interspersed with historical information and social commentary.

The book takes place in the aftermath of the Indian Rebellion of 1857 against British rule, with the passions and traumas aroused still very much alive among Indians and British alike. An alternate title by which the book was known—"The End of Nana Sahib"—refers to the appearance in the book of the historical figure—rebel leader Nana Sahib—who disappeared after the crushing of the rebellion, his ultimate fate unknown. Verne offers a fictional explanation to his disappearance.

== Plot ==
=== Part I – The Demon of Cawnpore ===
In the summer of 1866, in Aurangabad, the British colonial government announces a bounty on the head of Nana Sahib, who is supposed to be hiding nearby. Disguised as a sage, he kills the man who claims to know his face. Nana Sahib escapes from Aurangabad the same night and, accompanied by his brother Bala Rao and his followers, hides in the Ajanta and Ellora caves respectively, and later retreats to the Vindhiyanchal mountains to hide from the colonial forces.

Nana Sahib, along with his brother and followers, hides in various small fortresses called Pals, and mostly inside Pal of Tandil. His brother Bala Rao, who is extremely similar to Nana sahib in physical appearance, inquires about the inhabitants of the fortress and learns from locals that none except local outlaws, insurgents and a mad woman knows about the place. The mad woman is known as Rowing Flame as she carries a burning torch and roams the wilderness in the valley of Narmada. The locals respect the mysterious lady and feed and cloth her. From this hiding place, Nana Sahib launches an underground movement and secretly visit local chieftains for persuading them for an uprising.

Meanwhile, in Calcutta, a group of Europeans is planning for a voyage through India. The group consist of Banks, a railroad engineer; Maucler, the French adventurer and narrator for most of the story; Captain Hood, a hunter craving his half century of tigers, retired Colonel Sir Edward Munro, whose motive behind joining this expedition is to find and kill Nana Sahib to avenge his wife, who supposedly died in the Cawnpore massacre. Servants accompanying them include Sergeant McNeil, Munro's faithful servant; Fox, the faithful servant of Captain Hood and fellow hunter, who has killed 37 tigers; Monsieur Parazard; a Negro cook of French origins; Storr, a British Engine driver; Kilouth, an Adivasi coal shoveler and Gotimi, the faithful Gurkha servant of Colonel Munro.

Banks, the Engineer, introduces the machine he invented, a Steam powered mechanical elephant, which pulls two comfortable carriages having all the comforts of a 19th-century house. The machine can walk across land and float across rivers using embedded paddle wheels. The steam elephant is named Behemoth and together with two carriages, it is called the Steam House. The first carriage is used by the gentlemen, while the other is reserved for the servants. They start from Calcutta, and travel around the French town of Chandannagar, and Burdawan, Patna and Chitra, reach Gaya, where they visit various Hindu and Buddhist temples and bathing Ghat. On the way to Banaras they are interrupted by Hindu fanatics who consider the Steam House to be the chariot of their deity. Banks frightens them away by directing steam exhaust at them. In Banaras, Banks and Maucler notice a man spying on them but resolve not to tell the Colonel. From Banaras, they travel to Allahabad, where they learn that Nana Sahib has been declared dead after a skirmish in the defiles of Satpura. Colonel Munro is shocked by this news, as he wanted to take revenge himself. After Munro's request, they decides to pass through Kanpur, where an emotional Colonel visits his old house and the well which is supposedly the grave of Mrs. Munro and other victims of the massacre. The group decides to journey towards a northern forest, and pass the Monsoon season there, hunting wild animals. On the way to Terai, they defeat three elephants of an arrogant Gujarati Prince in a competition with Behemoth. Near Terai, they are caught in a violent thunderstorm and Gautami narrowly survives after being struck by lightning. The man who was spying on the Steam House meets Nana in Bhopal and informs him of further plans of the inhabitants of the Steam House. Nana orders his faithful follower Kalagni to infiltrate the Steam House and lure them near Nana Sahib's hiding place. While returning to their hiding place, near the Pal of Tandil, they are ambushed by British forces, who were directed unwittingly by the madwoman Rowing Flame. A body matching the description of Nana Sahib is found and he is declared dead by the British authorities.

=== Part II – Tigers and Traitors ===
The inhabitants of the Steam House camp on a plateau in Terai. During a hunting expedition, they rescue Mathias Van Guitt, an animal purveyor, from his own trap. They visit the kraal of Van Guitt, where Colonel Munro is saved from a poisonous snake by one of Van Guitt's servants, Kalagni. The Steam House dwellers frequently visit the kraal and invite Van Guitt to the Steam House. Van Guitt tries to capture animals, while the inhabitants of the Steam House hunt animals. One night, tigers and other predatory animals attack the kraal. The protagonists narrowly escape death but many Indian servants are killed. The buffaloes are either killed by animals or driven away into the jungle. Consequently, Van Guitt has the protagonists drag his caravan of cages to the nearest railway station. After reaching the station and loading his cargo, Van Guitt and the protagonists part ways. The protagonists employ Kalagni as guide and servants and head for Bombay through Central India. During the journey through jungles, they encounter a herd of monkeys and a grain transport caravan. Kalagni meets an old acquaintance in the caravan and chats mysteriously with him. On their way to Jabalpur in the jungle, they are cornered and attacked by a herd of elephants, which results in the loss of the second carriage. To escape from the herd, Banks drives the Steam House into Lake Puturia. All the food and provisions are lost with the second carriage and after some time, the fuel is exhausted, resulting in the Steam House floating in the middle of the lake. Kalagni volunteers to swim to shore and fetch help. Colonel Munro, suspecting him, sends his faithful servant Gautami with him. Both swim to shore while the steam House slowly drift in the fog. As soon as they reach the shore, Kalagni meets Nassim, a follower of Nana, and tries to attack Goumi, who swiftly escapes. With the morning breeze, the Steam House drifts towards the bank. As the protagonists land, they are attacked by a group of men led by Kalagni and Nassim who attack and kidnap Colonel Munro, leaving the others bonded with ropes. Colonel Munro is taken to an abandoned fort, where Nana Sahib shows up and reveals the reality of the news of his death. The dead person who was identified as Nana Sahib was actually his look-alike brother, Balao Rao. Due to their physical similarity, the British authorities mistook Balao Rao for Nana Sahib. Nana Sahib proclaims death for Colonel Munro To avenge death of his brother, members of the royal family of the last Mughal emperorss Bahadur Shah II and other victims of British suppuration of the Indian Rebellion of 1857. Colonel Munro is tied on the mouth of a large cannon, to be shot at sunrise. Nana leaves for a meeting in a nearby village. Near dawn, Munro is rescued by Goumi, who had hid himself inside the cannon after running away from Lake Puturia and overhearing the plans of the rebels. As they are escaping, they encounter Rowing Flame. Colonel Munro recognizes her as his wife Lady Munro, but she has lost her sanity and doesn't recognize him and refuses to go with him. Sparks from her torch cause the canon to go off. Munro and Goumi escape with Lady Munro while the people in the fort are confused. But soon they are spotted by Kalagni and his men and encounter Nana Sahib on his way back to fort. Goumi and Munro quickly overpowers Nana and his assistant. As they are being chased by the men led by Kalagni, they are rescued by other protagonists riding on Behemoth. They take Nana Sahib as prisoner and they are chased through the jungle. Capt Hood and Sgt. McNeil shoot down many of their adversaries, including Kalagni. As they near a military outpost, Banks supercharges the boiler and the protagonists escape the Behemoth, leaving bounded Nana Sahib inside the machine. As the men approach the machine, the boiler bursts, leaving everyone near it dead, although Nana's body is not found. The protagonists are rescued by the stationed regiment as the rest of the insurgents flee to inner country. They head for Mumbai via railway and then to Calcutta. In the care of Colonel Munro, Lady Munro regains her sanity and memory. When Munro tell Hood about not being able to achieve his target of killing 50 tigers, Hood replies that Kalagni was his 50th tiger.

== Alternative titles ==
The novel is usually published in two volumes or parts.

- Demon of Cawnpore (Part 1 of 2)
- Demon of the Cawnpore (Part 1 of 2)
- Steam House (Part I) The Demon of Cawnpore
- Steam House (Part II) Tigers and Traitors
- Tigers and Traitors (Part 2 of 2)
- Tigers and Traitors, Steam House (Part 2 of 2)
- The End of Nana Sahib

== See also ==
- History of steam road vehicles
