= Remember Cawnpore =

British battle cry

Remember Cawnpore became a British battle cry on 17 July 1857 after officers discovered the bodies of British women and children in a well at Kanpur, India, following the Siege of Cawnpore during the Indian Rebellion of 1857.

== Origins ==
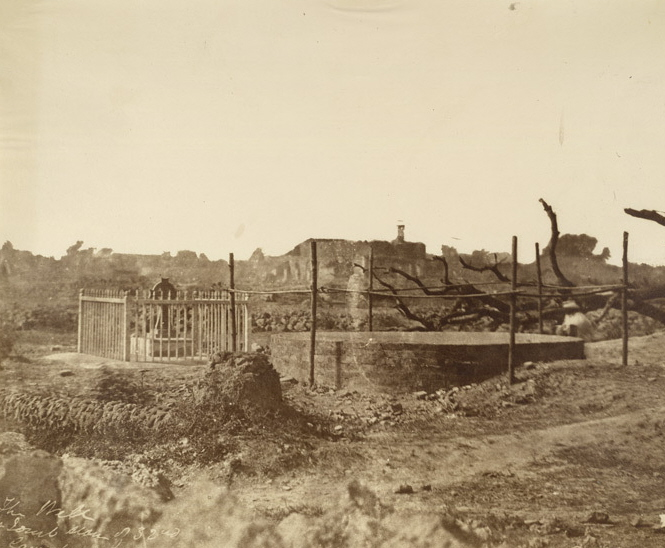
The well at Kanpur (1858)

On 17 July 1857 the term 'remember Cawnpore' was coined upon the discovery by General Havelock's forces of bodies of British women and children in a well at Kanpur, India, following the Siege of Cawnpore during the Indian Rebellion of 1857.

== Use ==
The phrase was widely used by British troops from mid-July until the end of the rebellion, being shouted as a rallying cry and painted on walls.

'Remember Cawnpore' became the title of the third episode of the British TV series The British Empire (1972).
