= Nana Saheb Peshwa II =

Indian aristocrat (1824–1859)

Shreemant Peshwa Nana Saheb II
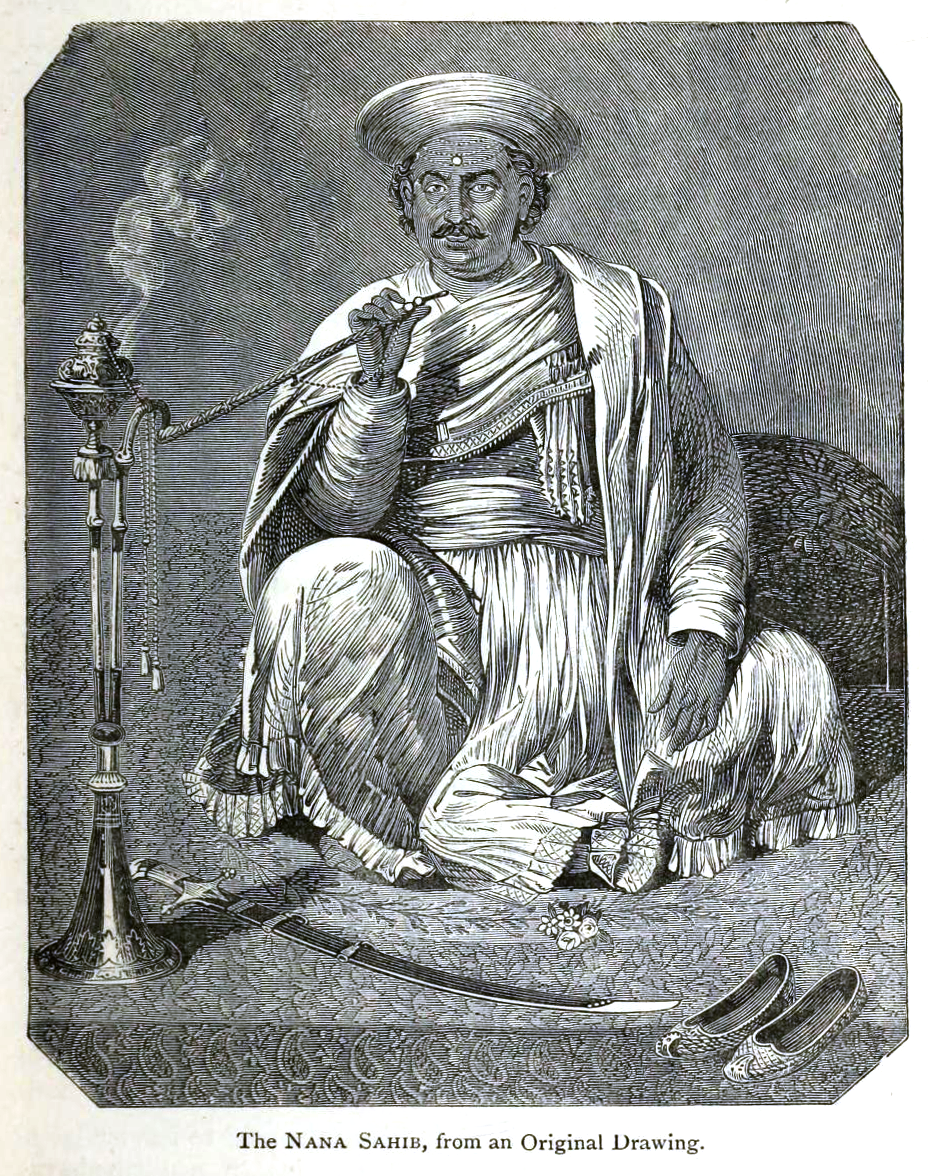

14th Peshwa of the Maratha Empire (pretender)
- In office 1 February 1851 – 30 June 1857 (unrecognized)
- Preceded by: Baji Rao II

Peshwa from Kanpur
- In office 1 July – 16 July 1857

Personal details
- Born: Dhondu Pant; 19 May 1824 Bithur, Cawnpore, Ceded Provinces, British India (present-day Bithoor, Kanpur Nagar district, Uttar Pradesh, India)
- Died: 24 September 1859 (aged 35) (disputed) Kathmandu, Nepal
- Parent(s): Narayan Bhat (father); Ganga Bai (mother)
- Relatives: Baji Rao II (adoptive father & uncle)

Military service
- Battles/wars: Indian Rebellion of 1857: Siege of Cawnpore; Satichaura massacre; Bibighar massacre

Nana Saheb Peshwa II (19 May 1824 – after 1857), born Nana Govind Dhondu Pant, was an Indian aristocrat and fighter who led the Siege of Cawnpore (Kanpur) during the Indian Rebellion of 1857 against the East India Company. As the adopted son of the exiled Maratha Peshwa, Baji Rao II, Nana Saheb believed he was entitled to a pension from the Company. However, after being denied recognition under Lord Dalhousie's doctrine of lapse, he joined the 1857 rebellion and took charge of the rebels in Kanpur. He forced the British garrison in Kanpur to surrender and subsequently ordered the killing of the survivors, briefly gaining control of the city. After the British recaptured Kanpur, Nana Saheb disappeared, and conflicting accounts surround his later life and death.

== Early life ==
Nana Saheb was born on 19 May 1824 as Nana Govind Dhondu Pant, to Narayan Bhat and Ganga Bai. After the Marathas were defeated in the Third Anglo-Maratha War, the East India Company exiled Peshwa Baji Rao II to Bithoor (near Kanpur), but allowed him to maintain a large establishment, partly funded by a British pension. Nana Saheb's father, a well-educated Deccani Brahmin, had travelled with his family from the Western Ghats to serve as a court official for the exiled Peshwa. He married the sister of one of the Peshwa's wives, with whom he had two sons.

As Baji Rao II had no biological sons, he adopted Nana Saheb and his younger brother, Bala Saheb, in 1827. Nana Saheb's childhood companions included Tatya Tope, Azimullah Khan, and Manikarnika Tambe, the future Rani of Jhansi. Tatya Tope, Nana Saheb's fencing master, was the son of Pandurang Rao Tope, a significant noble in the Peshwa's court who had accompanied his sovereign into exile. Azimullah Khan later became Nana Saheb's secretary and dewan.

== Inheritance ==
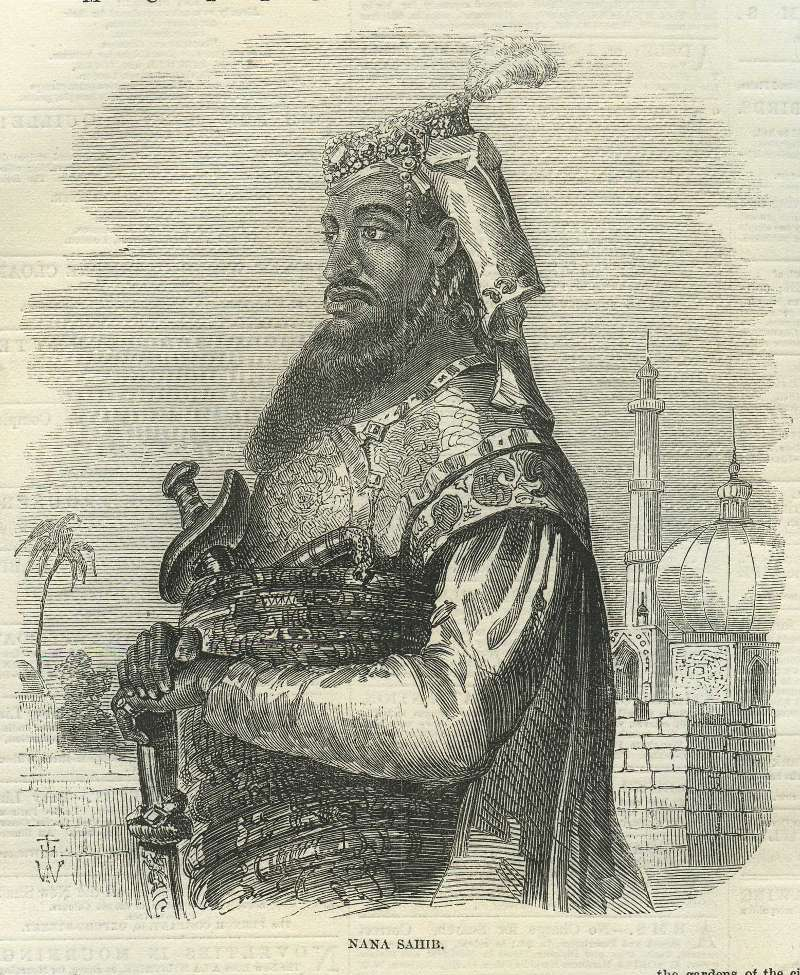
A portrait of Nana Saheb titled "Nana Sahib," published in The Illustrated London News in 1857.

At the time, the British East India Company had absolute, imperial administrative control over many regions across the subcontinent. The doctrine of lapse was an annexation policy devised by Lord Dalhousie, the British Governor-General of India between 1848 and 1856. According to this doctrine, any princely state or territory under the paramountcy of the Company would automatically be annexed if the ruler was either "manifestly incompetent" or died without a direct heir. The doctrine overturned the long-established right of an Indian sovereign without an heir to select a successor, with the British reserving the power to decide the competency of potential rulers. The policy was widely resented by Indians as illegitimate.

Although the Peshwa's domains had been annexed in 1818, prior to the implementation of the doctrine, upon the death of Baji Rao II, the Company invoked the doctrine to deny Nana Saheb the pension previously granted, as he was an adopted son. Baji Rao had been provided with an annual pension of 800,000 Rupees (£80,000 at the time), along with tax-free lands, but these provisions were rescinded after his death. Nana Saheb repeatedly appealed for the restoration of the pension and funds, initially using the pro-Indian barrister John Lang to appeal to the authorities in India. Following the failure in India, he sent his advocate, Azimullah Khan along with an entourage, to London, to plead his case directly to the British government. However, this attempt too was unsuccessful.

== Role in the 1857 uprising ==
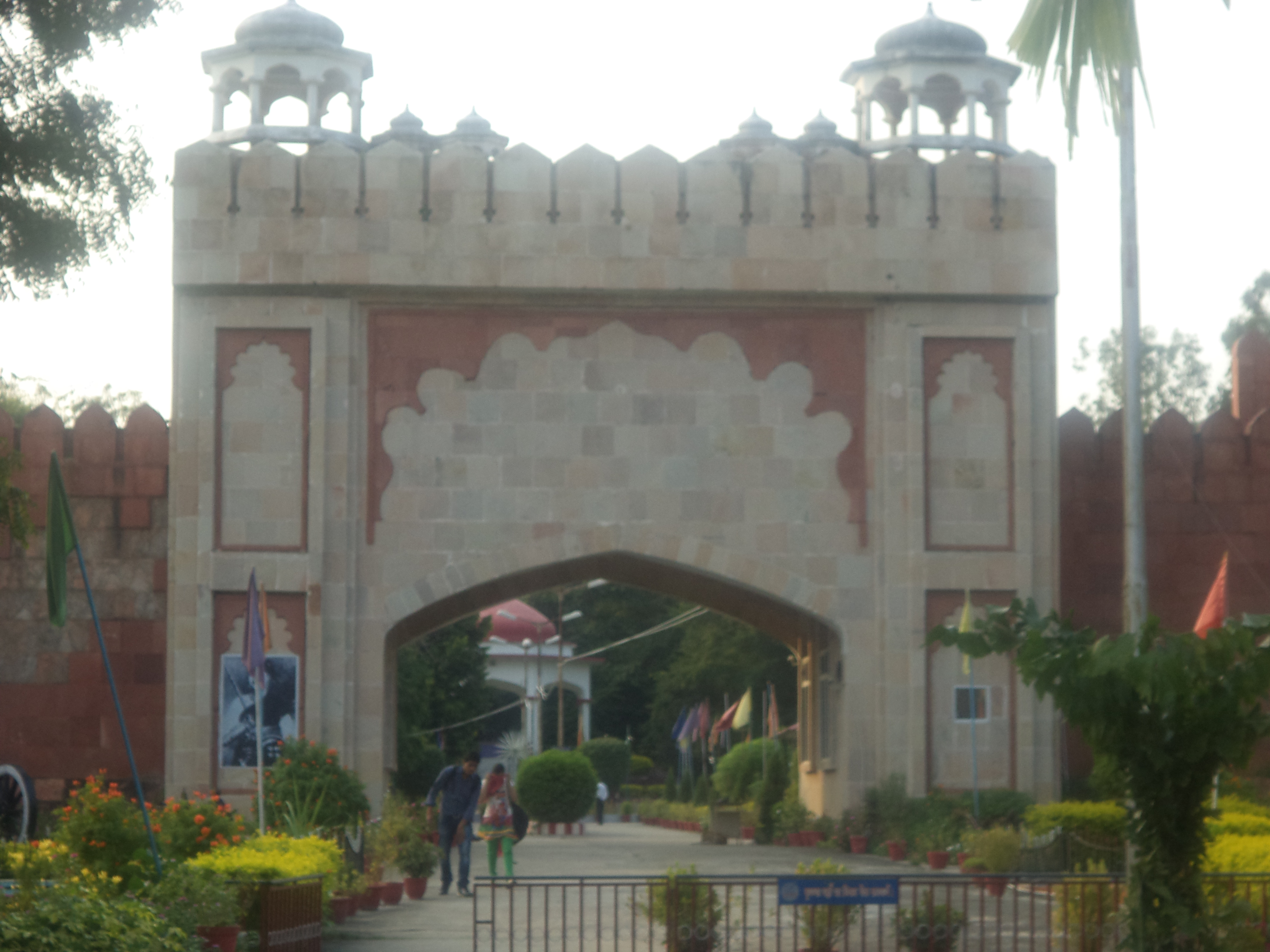
Nana Saheb Memorial in Bithoor

The town of Bithur was 13 miles northwest of Kanpur. In the well-furnished palace which he had inherited from his adopted father, the Nana Sahib entertained British officers and frequently gave parties. He was known to be a generous host and so was well-liked by the British officers. In April 1857, the Nana went on a tour of the neighbouring cantonments, ostensibly on a pilgrimage. He was well received in Lucknow by Sir Henry Lawrence, however he suddenly cut short the visit and returned to Kanpur. Major General Hugh Massey Wheeler explicitly trusted the Nana, since his wife was related to Nana's family. So when reports, that the disbanded troops of the 19th Native Infantry were lavishly entertained by the Nana whilst they were passing through Bithur in late April 1857, reached the British, Gen. Massey took no notice. By May 1857, there were disturbances and arson attacks in the city. Candid and blunt warnings regarding Nana's intentions issued by sympathetic Indians, such as the banker Nanak Chand, were ignored by the British who invited the Nana to become a part of the committee in charge of discussions relating to the defence of the cantonments.

The Nana Sahib expressed loyalty to Company officials in Kanpur and even offered to protect the Europeans in the city. It was planned that Nana Saheb would assemble a force of 1,500 soldiers to fight the rebels, in case the rebellion spread to Kanpur. Gen. Wheeler put the treasury in charge of Nana's own troops. Gen. Wheeler was so confident that there would be no action at Kanpur that he even sent a detachment of his small force to Lucknow.

The British had two potential locations where they could take refuge in the event of trouble. There was a fortified magazine with high and thick walls, 3 miles upstream of the cantonment, however the magazine did not have easy access to water. Therefore, instead of fortifying the magazine north of the depot with adequate arms and ammunition and sinking wells, the British barricaded themselves in two large, yet poorly fortified barrack buildings, one of masonry and another with a thatched roof, near the road to Allahabad, because there was a well near the buildings. They had started constructing a masonry wall, but the wall was only four feet tall at the start of the conflict and was not bulletproof. Sixty years after the events, a large, fortified, Mughal-era underground room was discovered at the barracks' site, the presence of which seems to have been unknown to both the British and Nana Saheb in 1857.

=== Attack on Wheeler's entrenchment ===
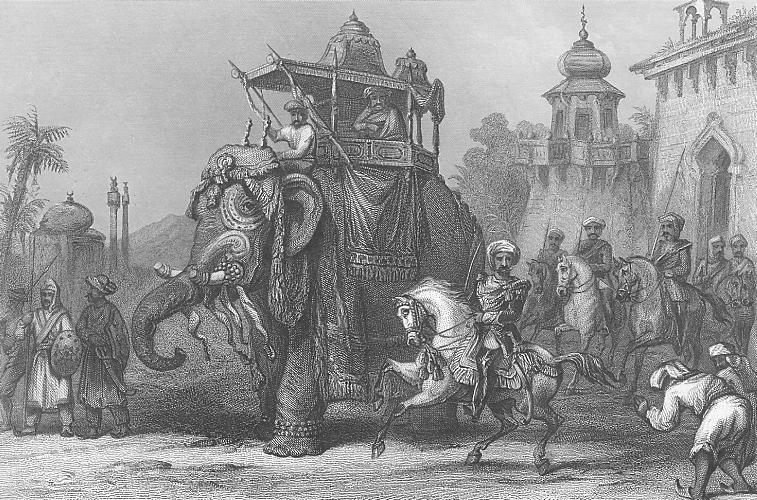
Nana Saheb with his escort. Steel-engraved print from 1860, published in History of the Indian Mutiny

On 4 June, part of the Company sepoys of the 1st, 53rd, and 56th Native Infantry regiments and the 2nd Cavalry regiment of the East India Company at Kanpur rebelled, and the British contingent took refuge at the barracks in the northern part of the town. The Company forces had expected the rebels to leave for Delhi, so were unprepared for a lengthy defence.

The barracks housed around 900 Europeans, Eurasians, and Indians, of which only 210 were European soldiers, joined by around 100 armed civilians. The British had five 9-pounders, one brass 3-pounder, and a mortar. Amid the prevailing chaos, Nana Saheb and his forces entered the British magazine in the northern part of Kanpur. The loyal sepoys of the 53rd Native Infantry guarding the magazine, assumed that the Nana was there to protect it on behalf of the Company and thus he gained control of the magazine. After burning some bungalows, the rebels, and as expected, left Kanpur for Delhi.

Nana Sahib, who hitherto had officially been uncommitted to the cause of the rebellion or was, at least officially, very pro-British, took control of the Company treasury, which, in accordance to the plans of the defence company, was guarded by his forces. Once the magazine and the treasury were in his control, the Nana Saheb officially declared his participation in the rebellion against the Company. On the advice of Azimullah Khan, the Nana rushed up the Grand Trunk Road on his state elephant. He caught up with rebel Company soldiers who were headed to Delhi to meet Bahadur Shah II, at Kalyanpur. Nana persuaded them to return to Kanpur and assist him in defeating the British by promising to double their pay and reward them with gold. He declared his intention to restore the Maratha Confederacy under the Peshwa tradition, with plans to capture Kanpur. He appointed Jwala Prasad as brigadier of the new army, his elder brother Baba Bhutt as the judge of Kanpur and Azimulla Khan as the collector.

On 5 June 1857, Nana Saheb sent a letter to General Hugh Wheeler, informing him to expect an attack at 10 am the next day. On 6 June, the rebel soldiers attacked the Company entrenchment at 10:30 am. The British, caught off guard, defended themselves as the attackers hesitated to enter the entrenchment, for fear of mined trenches. On 7 June, the rebels brought large calibre guns, and the bombardment of the entrenchment began. In the subsequent battle, Nana Saheb's eldest son, Baan Rao, was killed.

As Nana Saheb's attack on the British garrison became known, more rebel sepoys joined him. By 10 June, Nana led around 12,000 to 15,000 Indian soldiers. The first week of the siege saw Nana's forces establish firing positions from nearby buildings. Captain John Moore of the defending forces launched retaliatory night sorties. Nana Saheb then withdrew his headquarters to Savada House, two miles away. On 13 June, the rebels set fire to one of the thatched barracks used as a hospital and charged the British lines, but their charge was repelled by British grapeshot.

Sniper fire and bombardment continued until 23 June 1857. A prophecy about the downfall of East India Company rule exactly 100 years after the Battle of Plassey motivated over 4,000 rebel soldiers to launch a major attack on 23 June, beginning with a cavalry charge. General Wheeler waited until the cavalry was 50 yards away before opening fire with grapeshot.The infantry, using cotton bales for cover, approached within 100 yards of the perimeter but failed to breach the entrenchment and had to retreat. On the same day, a 9-pound shot decapitated Gordon Wheeler, General Wheeler's son.

The British held out for three weeks with little water and food, losing many to sunstroke and dehydration. Meanwhile, in the city, those Indians associated with the British or loyal to them, were killed. In due course, sectarian violence erupted, partly inflamed by Baba Bhatt, Nana's elder brother, who had ordered his soldiers to amputate the hands of Muslim butchers who had been caught slaughtering cows, a procedure which led to the deaths of the butchers. The situation was defused to some extent by Azimulla Khan. On 25 June, a Eurasian prisoner named Mrs Jacobi, approached the entrenchment with an offer of honourable surrender and safe passage to Allahabad. Facing dwindling provisions and with no reinforcements, following discussions with his remaining officers, Wheeler accepted the offer on 26 June, leading to a truce and negotiations with Vakil Azimulla Khan and Brigadier Jawala Prasad. During the negotiations, it was agreed that the garrison would be allowed to march out with their side arms and ammunition but would have to leave the artillery behind. Nana's officials also promised to provide the garrisons with boats which would allow them to evacuate from Kanpur.

=== Satichaura Ghat massacre ===
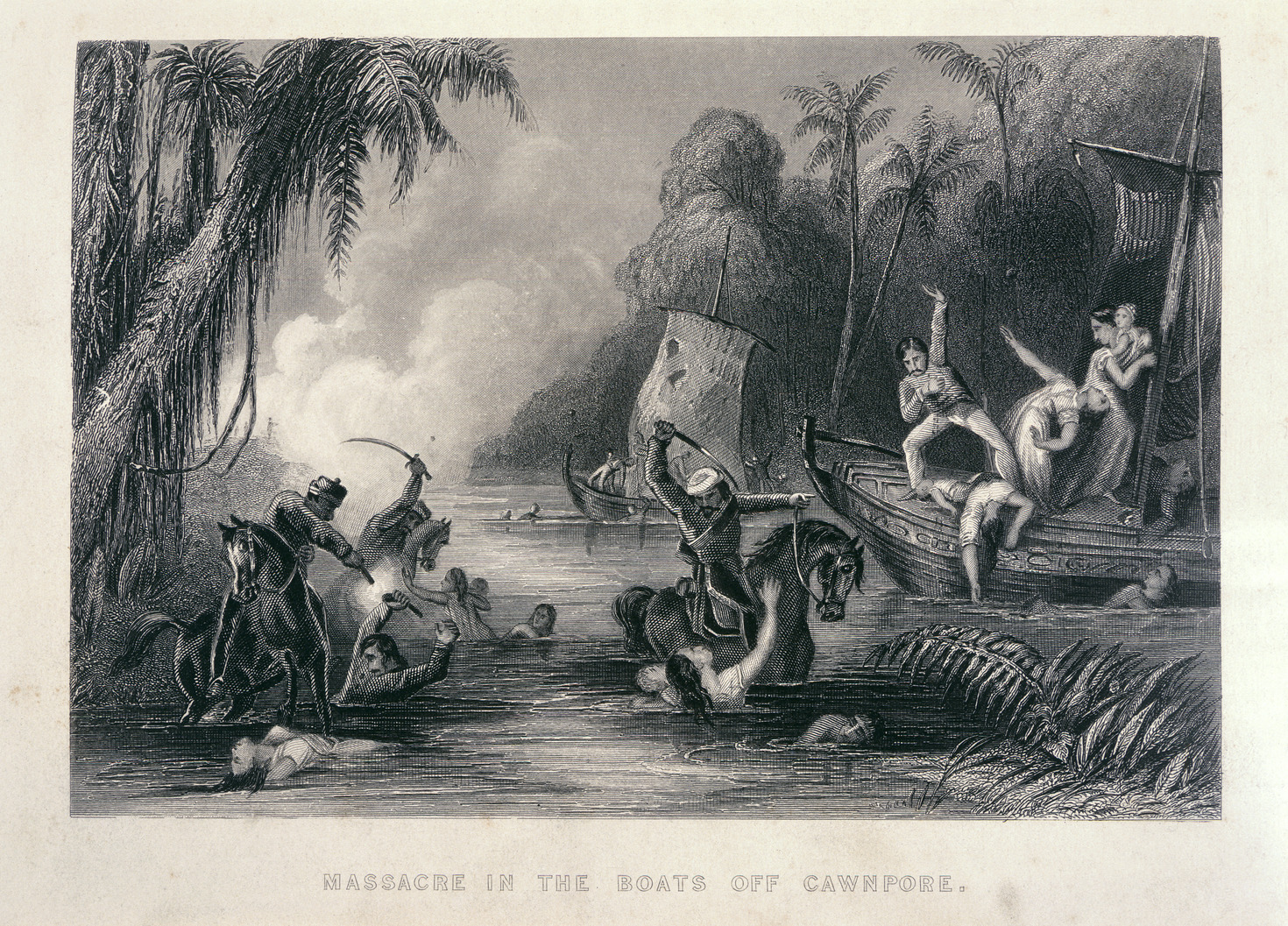
A contemporary depiction of the massacre at Satichaura Ghat

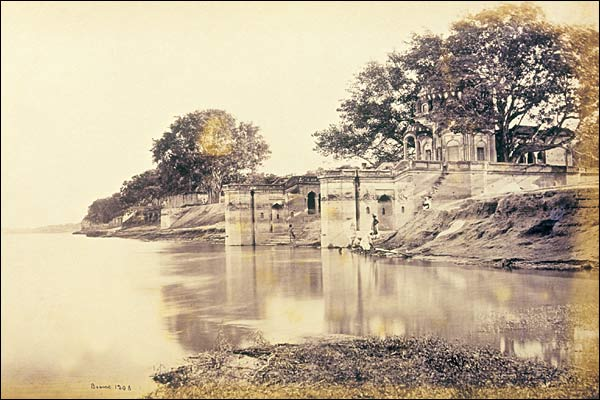
Sati Chaura Ghat (jetty)

On the morning of 27 June, Wheeler's column, consisting primarily of unarmed civilians, including more than 300 women and children, emerged from the entrenchment. Nana sent a number of carts, dolis, and elephants to enable the women, children, and sick to proceed to the riverbanks. The Company officers and military men were allowed to take their arms and ammunition with them and were escorted by nearly the entire rebel army. They reached the Satichaura Ghat by 8 am. At this ghat, Nana Saheb had arranged around 40 boats, belonging to a boatman named Hardev Mallah, for their departure to Allahabad.

However, Nana Saheb's rebels had deliberately placed the boats as high in the mud as possible to delay the boarding, making it difficult for the Europeans to drift the boats away. Wheeler and his party were the first aboard and managed to set their boat adrift. At this point, three shots were fired from the direction of Nana Saheb's camp, signalling the start of the attack. The Indian boatmen jumped overboard and began swimming toward the banks. However, according to Mowbray Thompson, one of the few survivors of the massacre, before the boatmen jumped overboard, they had "contrived to secrete burning charcoal in the thatch of most of the boats," which set some of the boats ablaze. Though there is controversy surrounding what exactly happened next at the Satichaura Ghat, the departing Europeans were attacked by the rebel sepoys, and most were either killed or captured.

Some of the Company officers later claimed that Nana had intentionally placed the boats high in the mud to cause delays. They also claimed that Nana had previously arranged for the rebels to fire upon and kill all the Europeans. Although the East India Company later accused Nana of betrayal and murder of innocent people, no definitive evidence has ever been found to prove that Nana had pre-planned or ordered the massacre. Some historians believe that the Satichaura Ghat massacre was the result of confusion rather than a plan implemented by Nana and his associates. Nevertheless, reports of snipers and cannons pre-positioned along the riverbank suggests pre-planning.

Amid the prevailing confusion at the Satichaura Ghat, Nana's general, Tatya Tope, allegedly ordered the 2nd Bengal Cavalry unit and some artillery units to open fire on the Europeans. The rebel cavalry sowars moved into the water to kill the remaining Company soldiers with swords and pistols. The surviving men were killed, while women and children were captured, as Nana did not approve of their killing. Around 120 women and children were taken prisoner and escorted to Savada House, Nana Saheb's headquarters during the siege. Two ladies, Mrs. Lett and Mrs. Bradshaw, hid among the grass, disguised themselves, and escaped at night. One boat also escaped, and the boaters found refuge with Raja Dirigibijah Singh, who protected them and later had them escorted to the British lines.

The rebel soldiers pursued Wheeler's boat, which was slowly drifting to safer waters. After some firing, the European men on the boat decided to fly the white flag. They were escorted off the boat and taken back to Savada House. The surviving men were seated on the ground as Nana's soldiers prepared to kill them. The women insisted they would die with their husbands but were pulled away. Nana granted the British chaplain Rev. Cockey's request to read prayers before they were killed. The British were initially wounded by gunfire and then killed with swords. The women and children were taken to Savada House to be reunited with their remaining colleagues.

=== Bibighar massacre ===
On the advice of astrologers, Nana was consecrated as Baji Rao's heir on 1 July amid much fanfare and a 21-gun salute. Meanwhile, the surviving women and children, along with their Indian supporters—around 120 in number—were moved from Savada House to Bibighar ("the House of the Ladies"), a villa-type house in Kanpur. They were later joined by other women and children, the survivors from Wheeler's boat. Another group of women and children from Fatehgarh, as well as some other captive women, were also confined in Bibighar. In total, there were around 200 women and children there. An Indian ayurvedic doctor was allowed to attend to the captives and recorded thirty-six fatalities (18 British women, 17 children, and 1 Hindu nurse), possibly due to cholera, in the first week of their capture. Following this, the captives were allowed out of the building twice a day under guard. In the meantime, Nana's army had swelled to over 20,000, and the billeting of these troops caused unhappiness among the citizens of Kanpur; sectarian tensions were increasing as well.

Nana Saheb deputed a tawaif (nautch girl) named Hussaini Khanum (also known as Hussaini Begum) to care for the survivors. He decided to use these prisoners as leverage in bargaining with the East India Company. On 9 July, Nana received news that a company of 700 under the command of Major Sydenham Renaud was advancing along the Grand Trunk Road, indiscriminately punishing Indian villages en route. Further Company forces, consisting of around 1,200 British soldiers, 150 Sikh soldiers, 30 irregular cavalry, and 6 cannons, had set out from Allahabad under the command of General Henry Havelock to retake Cawnpore and Lucknow. Havelock's forces were later joined by those under Major Renaud and James Neil. Nana demanded that the East India Company forces under Havelock and Neil retreat to Allahabad. However, the Company forces advanced relentlessly towards Cawnpore. Nana sent an army to check the advance of Major Renaud's forces, but they encountered General Havelock's army at Futtehpore on 12 July. The rebels could not counter the British artillery or the Enfield rifles, which had an accurate range of 900 yards and soon gave way. Tatya Tope had an elephant shot under him by a cannon roundshot, and General Havelock's forces emerged victorious, capturing the town with few casualties.

Nana then sent another force under the command of his brother, Bala Rao. On 15 July, Bala fortified his positions at Aong behind walled gardens, with two cannons covering the route of the British. The British mounted patrol was aware of this, leading to the Battle of Aong. Major Renaud charged at the head of his forces, was wounded in the thigh, and later succumbed to his injuries.The British artillery cleared the rebel artillery, forcing Bala to retreat beyond the Pandu River and secure the stone bridge across it. Sympathetic Indian villagers informed Havelock of this, and he marched his forces 16 miles under the sun, flanking the bridge from the village of Maharajpore. In the meantime, Nana Sahib had arrived with more artillery to bolster his forces. The British advanced under heavy fire. Havelock's son, Henry, rode his horse right against the muzzle of a cannon just before the touchhole was lit, thereby saving his company. He was awarded the Victoria Cross for this act. The British infantry charged, seized the lines, and Nana fled the field, leaving two cannons behind. On 16 July, Havelock's forces began advancing towards Bithur. They managed to rescue a prisoner from the siege, William Jonah Shepherd, who provided them with valuable information.

Nana Sahib and his associates, including Tatya Tope and Azimullah Khan, debated what to do with the four men and 206 women and children held at Bibighar. Some of Nana Sahib's advisors had already decided to kill the captives at Bibighar as revenge for the executions of Indians by the advancing British forces. Azimullah Khan suggested that the British might turn back from Kanpur if they had no hostages to rescue. The women of Nana Sahib's household opposed this decision and went on a hunger strike, but their efforts were in vain.

On the 15th, after Bala arrived and announced his defeat at the Pandu River, the four male captives—Mr Thornhill, a judge from Fatehgarh; Col. Smith; Col. Goldie; and the 14-year-old Greenway—were bound, brought out of Bibighar, and shot by the sepoys.

Within an hour, Hussaini Begum announced to the women that they too would be killed. Jemadar Yousef Khan and his sepoys refused to kill the prisoners, even disobeying the orders of Tatya Tope on the matter. That evening, Hussaini Khanum organised four butchers from the Kanpur market under the leadership of an Eurasian member of Nana's personal bodyguard, who was rumoured to be her partner, to kill the prisoners. During the course of the night, the entire group of prisoners was massacred. The screams were heard by the citizens who lived nearby. The next morning, the five returned with sweepers to remove the bodies. The bodies of the dead, the dying and three severely wounded boys were thrown into a well 9 feet wide and 50 feet deep near the house.

=== Recapture of Kanpur by the British ===
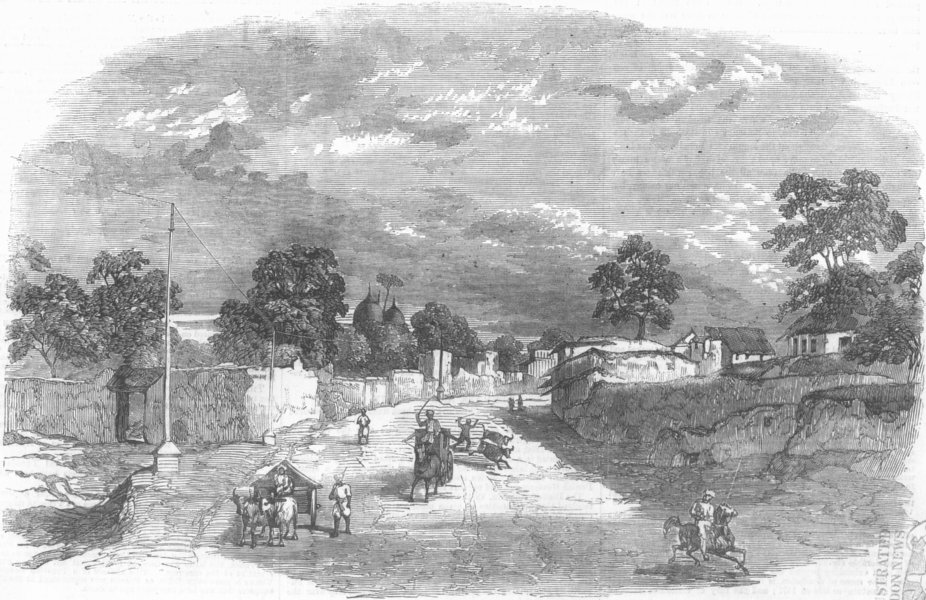
"Futtehpore, the scene of the recent engagement between General Havelock and Nana Sahib," from the Illustrated London News, 1857.

The Company forces reached Kanpur on 16 July 1857. Upon hearing of their approach and the news of the massacre, the local population fled. In the early hours of Friday, 17 July, the British arrived at Wheeler's encampment. Two sympathetic Indians informed Havelock about the massacre at Bibighar and that Nana Sahib had taken a position at Ahirwa village. The British forces launched an attack on Nana's troops and emerged victorious. In response, Nana blew up the Kanpur magazine, abandoned the location, and retreated to Bithur.

When the British soldiers, particularly Colonel Neill, learned of the Bibighar massacre where the women and children imprisoned in Bibighar had been massacred with appalling violence, they engaged in indiscriminate retaliatory violence, including looting and burning houses. Neill forced the captured rebels to clean up the blood in Bibighar before executing them. On 18 July, Havelock heard about Neill's punishments and put an end to the indiscriminate killing, even hanging one British soldier for his actions.

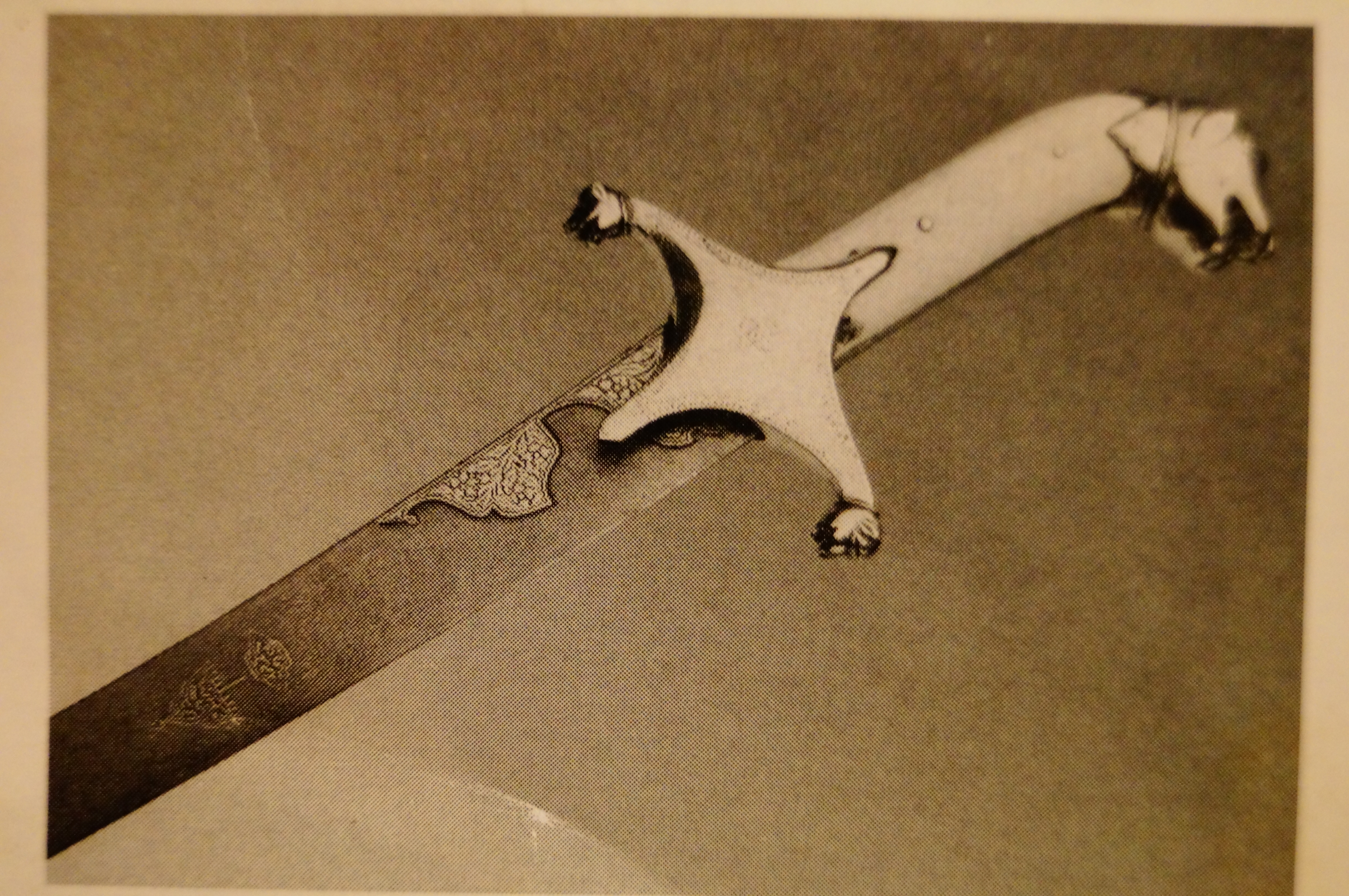
Provenance: This sword belonged to the Nana, who was held responsible by the British for the massacre at Kanpur during the Indian mutiny in 1857. It subsequently passed into the ownership of Brigadier Major Henry Templer, who commanded the 7th Regiment Bengal Infantry.

On 19 July, General Havelock resumed operations and left Bithur to save Lucknow, leaving Neill in charge at Kanpur. Nana Sahib had already escaped with an army of 12,000. Major Stevenson led a group of Madras Fusiliers and Sikh soldiers to Bithur, occupying Nana Sahib's palace without resistance. Very few relics of Nana Saheb are known, but a silver-mounted sword seems to be one of the more interesting artefacts. Many British search parties attempted to capture Nana Saheb but failed. A detachment of the 7th Bengal Infantry came very close to capturing him, but he managed to escape just in time, leaving this sword on the table where he had been dining. Major Templer (later Major General) of the 7th Bengal Infantry brought the sword home. In the 1920s, the family loaned it to the Exeter Museum, until it was sold at auction in 1992. The present whereabouts of this sword are unknown.

By 13 August, around 4,000 rebels had reoccupied Bithur and threatened Havelock's lines of communication at Bashiratganj. They were chased from their positions by the British, but they regrouped again at Bithur, where they were joined by the experienced Gwalior contingent and sepoys of the 42nd Infantry. In the subsequent engagement, the Madras Fusiliers, Highlanders, and Sikhs charged the defenders at Bithur, forcing them to retreat from Bithur and capture their artillery. Havelock's forces suffered over 50 battle casualties and 12 from heat stroke, but the rebels were driven out of Bithur. After leaving a small force in Kanpur, General Havelock marched to Lucknow, where he broke through the rebel lines and reached the residency, but was in turn, besieged again in the residency, on 25 September.

Sir Colin Campbell was then put in charge of the British forces in the area. Kanpur remained peaceful due to the British garrison, with scant news about the Nana Sahib. Rumours suggested he was attempting to link up with Tatiya Tope at Fatehpur Chaurasi or was in Chandemagore seeking French assistance. Campbell left for Lucknow on 9 November, leaving behind a garrison of 500 British and Sikh soldiers under the command of the inexperienced Major General Windham. Tatiya Tope's counterintelligence unmasked the Indian spies working for the British; they were mutilated and sent back to the British lines as a warning.

Tatiya Tope attempted to recapture Kanpur during the Second Battle of Cawnpore in November 1857. He arrived with 6,000 soldiers and 18 cannons, with increasing numbers of volunteers and stragglers joining him. On 24 November, Maj. Gen. Windham advanced to meet them, but the British lost the ensuing battle and retreated to the newly fortified barracks, leaving their wounded and dead on the field. By 27 November, Kanpur was back in the hands of the Peshwa, and the bombardment of the British lines began again. Wounded British officers left in the field, were hanged from the branches of the very banyan tree where Neill had previously hung suspected rebels. Tatiya Tope managed to take control of all the routes west and northwest of Kanpur.

Bala Rao, Jwala Prasad, and Rao Sahib set up their headquarters in the European quarter of Kanpur, though it remains unclear whether Nana Sahib and Azimulla Khan were with them or whether they both stayed at Bithur. In the meantime, Sir Colin Campbell retrieved the British forces from Lucknow and transported them to Allahabad. By 5 December, he had reached Kanpur with his army. Tatiya Tope's army had also been reinforced and now included over 14,000 men, including the Gwalior contingent and 40 cannons. On 6 December, the British commenced an artillery barrage, and General Mansfield attacked the left flank of the rebel army, defeating them. On 7 December, the British reached the Bithur palace. The Nana had fled just prior to the arrival of the British cavalry, taking much of his treasure with him; however, he left behind treasure worth millions of rupees, along with guns, elephants, silver howdahs, and camels, all of which were seized by the British. Following extensive excavations to retrieve any hidden treasure, they set Nana Sahib's palace on fire.

== Disappearance ==
Nana disappeared from Bithur after the company's recapture of Kanpur and Bithur. The British offered a reward of Rs 100,000 (£10,000) for his capture. Subsequently, his movements could not be confirmed, as he consistently stayed a step ahead of his would-be captors. On 10 February 1858, Nana was reported to have entered Bundelkhand. Anghad Tiwari, a capable intelligence officer of the British, tracked him to a small fort in Fatehpur Chaurasi on 17 February, but he escaped just prior to the arrival of the British cavalry.

At the start of April 1858, the British learned that Nana had crossed the river near Bithur with an escort of 500 cavalry; however, he evaded the patrols sent by General Hope Grant to apprehend him. By the end of April, Nana had retreated back to Shahjahanpur. On 29 April, he wrote a letter addressed to Queen Victoria, stating that he had committed no murders and that the killings were carried out by rebels or "budmashes" (hooligans). In the meantime, Bala wrote a letter blaming his brother for the situation, claiming his own innocence.

Following the capture of Gwalior, Rani Laxmibai, Tatya Tope, and Rao Saheb (Nana Saheb's nephew) proclaimed Nana Saheb as their Peshwa in June 1858 at Gwalior. In September 1858, Nana was reported to have fallen victim to malarial fever; however, this is disputed. He had also previously pretended to commit suicide at the Ganges whilst Bithur was taken by Sir Campbell's army, suggesting he might simply have been trying to cover his tracks and throw off the pursuit. In December 1858, both Nana and the Begum of Oudh were said to be in Bahraich.

On 30 December 1858, the British won the Battle of Banki. Although many rebels surrendered, it was understood that Nana and his younger brother Bala forded the river into Nepal with eight elephants loaded with treasure before the fight began. Both the rebels and the pursuing British suffered casualties during the river crossing due to the flooded river.

=== Nepal connection ===
By the start of 1859, Nana was reported to have fled to Nepal. Letters purportedly written by Bala and Nana, asking for terms of surrender, were sent to the British from Nepal; in these, the Nana blamed the East India Company's sepoys for the massacres of the civilians and Bala Rao blamed the Nana for enticing him to take an active role in the rebellion. Both asked for terms regarding surrendering and the British replied that only unconditional surrender would be accepted. Perceval Landon recorded that Nana Sahib lived out his days in western Nepal, in Thapa Teli near Ririthang, under the protection of Sir Jang Bahadur Rana, the Prime Minister of Nepal. The final confirmed letter written by Nana, stamped with his own seal, was dated 13 May 1859. Thereafter, the Nana disappeared from recorded history.

The Nana's family also received protection in Dhangara, eastern Nepal, in exchange for their store of precious jewels. In February 1860, the British were informed that Nana's wives had taken refuge in Nepal, residing in a house close to Thapathali. Nana himself was reported to be living in the interior of Nepal, as he did not trust the Rana. Some government records claim that the Nana died in Nepal after being attacked by a tiger during a hunt on 24 September 1859, though there are conflicting accounts as to whether he was in Nepal in September 1859 at all.

In October 1860, the British resident in Kathmandu was informed that Nana had died on 24 September 1860 due to malaria. Nana's ultimate fate was never confirmed, and Bala Rao was also said to have died of fever in the jungles of Nepal.

Venkateshwar, a Brahmin interrogated by the British, disclosed that he met Nana Sahib in Nepal in 1861. Up until 1888, there were rumours and reports that the Nana had been captured, with several individuals claiming to be the aged Nana turning themselves in to the British in hope of a part of the princely sum of reward. As these reports proved false, further attempts at apprehending him were abandoned and the police were ordered to release those who had turned themselves in. There were also reports of the Nana being spotted in Constantinople (now Istanbul).

=== Sihor connection ===
Two letters and a diary retrieved in the 1970s suggest that Nana Saheb might have spent the rest of his days as an ascetic, Yogindra Dayanand Maharaj, in Sihor in coastal Gujarat until his death in 1903. The letters, possibly written by Nana Saheb in Old Marathi and signed Baloo Nana, were addressed to Harshram Mehta, Nana's Sanskrit teacher. The third document, the diary of Kalyanji Mehta, Harshram's brother, is written in Old Gujarati. The diary records Nana Saheb's arrival in Sihor with his colleagues after the failure of the rebellion. Kalyanji raised Shridhar, Nana Saheb's son, under the name Giridhar, and arranged his marriage into a Sihori Brahmin family. The diary also notes Nana Saheb's death in 1903 at Kalyanji's house in Dave Sheri, Sihor, where some of Nana's belongings are still preserved. These documents were recovered by Keshavlal Mehta, Giridhar's son, in the 1970s, and his descendants continue to reside in the town.

The authenticity of these documents was accepted by G.N. Pant, former director of the National Museum, in 1992, but they have not received official recognition.

=== Belsare's account ===
K. V. Belsare's book on the Maharashtrian saint Brahmachaitanya Gondavlekar Maharaj claims that after the last battle, Nana Saheb went to Naimisharanya, the Naimisha Forest near Sitapur, Uttar Pradesh, where he met Brahmachaitanya Maharaj, who assured him of safety. Nana Saheb is said to have lived there from 1860 until his death in 1906. According to the book, he died between 30 October and 1 November 1906, and Shri Brahmachaitanya Maharaj performed his last rites. The authenticity of the claims in the book is not established.

Initially, Nana Saheb was deeply distressed by the loss of his kingdom in battle with the British. However, Shri Gondavalekar Maharaj explained to him the "Wish of God." He said, "It is very sad that Nana Saheb had to lose the battle and the kingdom in such a tragic way, but fighting the British is totally different from fighting the Mughals. People from the middle class, who understand the British language, will lead the next freedom war against the British. Soon they will come into the picture. Your role as a king or warrior has ended, and now you need to focus on the 'internal war'." Although it was initially difficult for Nana Saheb to accept this, he gradually came to terms with it and made progress on his spiritual journey.

=== Aftermath of the events of 1857 ===
Tatia Tope, Nana's commander, was betrayed in April 1859 by Man Singh, the Raja of Narwar, who handed him over to the British. On the 18th of April, he too was executed. Nana's brigadier, Jwala Prasad, was apprehended by the British and hanged in Kanpur on 3rd May 1860. During the trial, he claimed to have been physically present during the cremation of Nana's body in Nepal. Nana's nephew, Rao Sahib, who had played an active role in the events of 1857, too was betrayed and handed over to the British in 1862. He was hanged at Satichaura Ghat on the 20th of August.

Hussaini Begum is believed to have fled with Nana's entourage to Nepal, where she disappeared from history. However, Sarvur Khan, the Eurasian bodyguard she had employed to carry out the massacre at Bibighar, was arrested in February 1858 along with Muhammed Ali Khan, a courtier who had travelled to England in the entourage of Azimullah Khan. Owing to the chivalrous treatment and protection afforded to them by a British officer, Maj. Forbes-Mitchell, during their incarceration, right up to their execution, Muhammed Ali Khan provided more in-depth information about the events of 1857. He also placed the blame on Hussaini Begum for the Bibighar massacre, stating that she harboured some grievances against the British which she took out on the hapless captives.

Baba Bhutt and Azimullah Khan were reportedly seen near Kolkata but their fate remains uncertain since they were not apprehended by the British. It was reported that Baba Butt died of some disease. Azimullah too was said to have died of smallpox in Bengal. Alternatively, there are also claims that he actually escaped India and made his way to Istanbul along with his partner, an English lady, a certain Miss Clayton, where they lived until old age. According to this account, Khan was murdered by local Turks in Istanbul after Miss Clayton's death of old age.

General James Neill was killed in action during the relief of Lucknow on 25 September 1857. Major General Sir Henry Havelock died of dysentery in Lucknow in November 1857, shortly after the garrison had been rescued. Sir James Outram died in March 1863 in France, while Sir Colin Campbell, later ennobled as Baron Clyde, died in August 1863 in Kent.

After India gained independence in 1947, Nana was hailed as a freedom fighter, and the Nana Rao Park in Kanpur was constructed in honour of him and his brother, Bala Rao.

== In popular culture ==
- Nana Sahib, a drama in verse by Jean Richepin with incidental music by Jules Massenet, opened on 20 December 1883 at the Théâtre de la Porte Saint-Martin in Paris.
- Nana Sahib (based on Captain Nemo) is the principal character of the 1975 Soviet film Captain Nemo, portrayed by Vladislav Dvorzhetsky.
- "Nanib Sahir", a character in the Indian campaign of Age of Empires III: The Asian Dynasties, is loosely based on Nana Saheb.
- Jules Verne's novel The End of Nana Saheb (also published as "The Steam House"), set in India ten years after the 1857 events, is based on rumours and is not historically accurate. For example, the novel claims Nana Saheb had been married to Rani Lakshmibai of Jhansi.
- In The Devil's Wind, Manohar Malgonkar provides a sympathetic reconstruction of Nana Saheb's life before, during, and after the mutiny, as told in his own words.
- Another novel, Recalcitrance, published in 2008, the 150th anniversary of the Indian Rebellion of 1857, written by Anurag Kumar, presents a character similar to Sahib receiving blessings from an Indian sage, who also grants him a special boon connected to his life and the rebellion of 1857.
- The character of Surat Khan in the 1936 film The Charge of the Light Brigade seems to be loosely based on Nana Saheb.
- A novel by Donald Cirulli, titled The Devil's Wind, was published in 2018, describing, among other things, the siege of Wheeler's Entrenchment at Cawnpore and the British attack on Delhi (both in 1857).
- The character of Nana Saheb is portrayed by Bhupinder Singh in the DD National TV series 1857 Kranti.
- In Bharat Ek Khoj, the character of Nana Saheb was portrayed by Anang Desai.
- In Satyajit Ray's Feluda novel Bombaiyer Bombete, a necklace belonging to Nana Saheb from Kathmandu is smuggled into India.

== See also ==
- List of fugitives from justice who disappeared
- Ethnic communities in Kanpur
- Nana Fadnavis

== Sources ==
- Richards, Donald Sydney (2007). Cawnpore and Lucknow. Barnsley: Pen & Sword Military. ISBN 978-1-84415-516-3.
- Hibbert, Christopher (1978). The Great Mutiny. New York: Viking. ISBN 978-0-670-34983-8.
- Edwardes, Michael (1973). Red Year. London: Hamilton. ISBN 978-0-241-02349-5.
- Edwardes, Michael (1963). Battles of the Indian Mutiny. Pan. ISBN 978-0-330-02524-9.
- David, Saul (4 September 2003). The Indian Mutiny. London: ePenguin. ISBN 978-0-14-100554-6.
- David, Saul (2002). The Indian Mutiny. London: Viking. ISBN 978-0-670-91137-0. OCLC 59463263.

Preceded by Baji Rao II	Peshwa; 1851–1857	Succeeded by none
