= Battle of Aong =

Battle of the Indian Rebellion of 1857

Coordinates: 26.1545686°N 80.566240°E

- Part of Indian rebellion of 1857
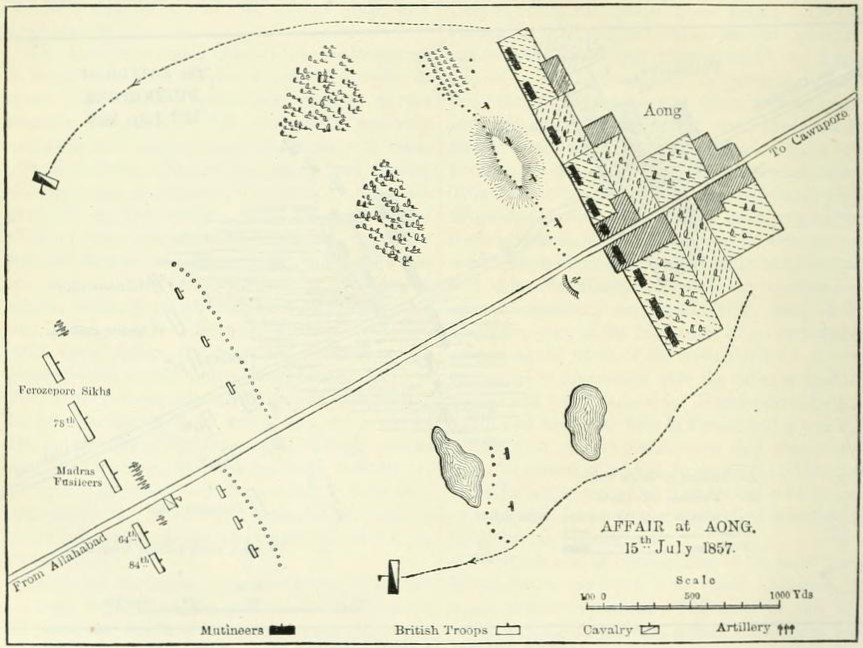
- Affair at Aong, 15th July 1857 (map from Cassell's Illustrated History of India, Volume 2, 1879)
Date	July 15, 1857
Location	Outskirts of Aong village
Result	Company victory

Belligerents
Nana Sahib's forces, Rebel Company sepoys	British East India Company

Commanders and leaders
Bala Rao	(United Kingdom) Henry Havelock

The Battle of Aong took place on July 15, 1857, during the Indian rebellion of 1857, between the East India Company forces and Nana Sahib's forces.

The East India Company forces under the command of General Sir Henry Havelock were advancing to Kanpur (Cawnpore), which had been besieged by Nana Sahib, supported by the rebel Company sepoys. Nana Sahib had earlier sent an army to check the advance of General Havelock to Kanpur, but it was defeated by Havelock's forces at Fatehpur on July 12. Nana Sahib then sent another force under the command of his brother, Bala Rao.

On July 15, the British forces under General Havelock defeated Bala Rao's army in the Battle of Aong, just outside the Aong village. During the battle, Havelock was able to capture some of the rebel soldiers, who informed him that there was an army of 5,000 rebel soldiers with eight artillery pieces further up the road. This enabled Havelock to decide his further strategy.
