= Siege of Cawnpore =

Siege during the Indian rebellion of 1857

Coordinates: 26.4607°N 80.3334°E

- Part of the Sepoy Mutiny of 1857
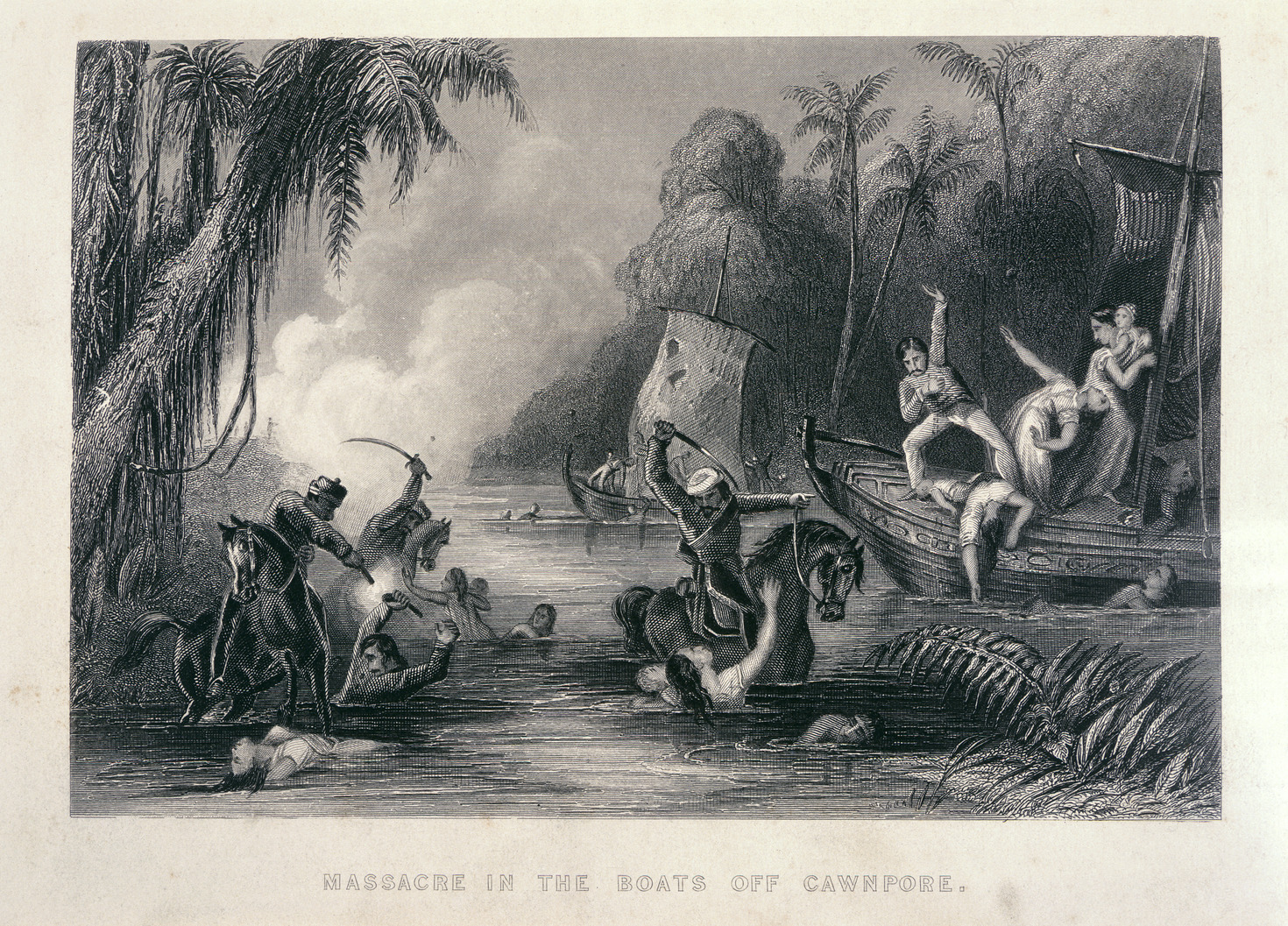
- A contemporary engraving of the massacre at the Satichura Ghat
Date	5–25 June 1857
Location	Cawnpore, India
Result	Rebel victory

Belligerents
East India Company	Nana Sahib's forces Rebel Company soldiers

Commanders and leaders
Hugh Wheeler †; John Moore †	Nana Sahib; Tantya Tope; Bala Rao

Strength
Around 900 including civilians and 300 soldiers	Around 4,000 rebels

Casualties and losses
All, except five men and two women	Unknown

The siege of Cawnpore was a key episode in the Indian Rebellion of 1857. The besieged East India Company forces and civilians in Cawnpore (now Kanpur) were duped into a false assurance of a safe passage to Allahabad by the rebel forces under Nana Sahib. Their evacuation from Cawnpore thus turned into a massacre; most of the men were killed, while women and children were taken to a nearby dwelling known as Bibi Ghar. As an East India Company rescue force from Allahabad approached Cawnpore, around 200 British women and children captured by the rebels were butchered in what came to be known as the Bibi Ghar massacre, their remains then thrown down a nearby well. Following the recapture of Cawnpore and the discovery of the massacre, the angry Company forces engaged in widespread retaliation against captured rebel soldiers and local civilians. The murders greatly enraged the British rank-and-file against the sepoy rebels and inspired the war cry "Remember Cawnpore!".

== Background ==
Cawnpore was an important garrison town for the East India Company forces. Located on the Grand Trunk Road, it was connected directly to the Sindh (Sind), Punjab and Awadh (Oudh) regions.

By June 1857 the Indian rebellion had spread to several areas near Cawnpore, namely Meerut, Agra, Mathura and Lucknow. However the Indian sepoys at Cawnpore initially remained loyal. The British General at Cawnpore, Hugh Wheeler, knew the local language, had adopted local customs and was married to an Indian woman. He was confident that the sepoys at Cawnpore would remain loyal to him and sent two British companies (one each of the 84th and 32nd Regiments) to besieged Lucknow.

The British contingent in Cawnpore consisted of around nine hundred people, including around three hundred military men, around three hundred women and children and about one hundred and fifty merchants, business owners, drummers (salesman), engineers and others. The rest were the native servants, who left soon after the commencement of the siege.

In the case of a rebellion by the sepoys in Cawnpore, the most suitable defensive location for the British was the magazine in the north of the city. It had thick walls, ample ammunition and stores and also hosted the local treasury. However General Wheeler decided to take refuge in the south of the city, in an entrenchment composed of two barracks surrounded by a mud wall. There was a military building site to the south of Cawnpore, where nine barracks were being constructed at the dragoon barracks. The British soldiers found it difficult to dig deep trenches, as it was the hot summer season. The area also lacked good sanitary facilities and there was only one well (which would be exposed to enemy fire in the event of an attack). In addition there were several buildings overlooking the entrenchment that would provide cover for the attackers, allowing them to shoot down on the defenders easily.

General Wheeler's choice of this location to make a stand remains controversial given the availability of safer and more defensible places in Cawnpore. It is believed that he was expecting reinforcements to come from the southern part of the city. He also assumed that, in event of a rebellion, the Indian troops would probably collect their arms, ammunition and money and head to Delhi and therefore he did not expect a long siege.

== Rebellion at Fatehgarh ==
The first sign of the rebellion at Cawnpore came in the form of a rebellion at Fatehgarh (or Futteghur), a military station on the banks of the Ganges. To disperse the Indian troops away from Cawnpore and lessen the chances of a rebellion, General Wheeler decided to send them on various "missions". On one such mission he sent the 2nd Oudh Irregulars to Fatehgarh. On the way to Fatehgarh, General Wheeler's forces under the command of Fletcher Hayes and Lieutenant Barbour met two more Englishmen, Mr Fayrer and Lieutenant T. Carey.

On the night of 31 May 1857 Hayes and Carey departed to a nearby town to confer with the local magistrate. After their departure the Indian troops rebelled and decapitated Fayrer. Barbour was also killed as he tried to escape. When Hayes and Carey came back the next morning, an older Indian officer galloped towards them and advised them to run away. However, as the Indian officer explained the situation to them, the rebel Indian sowars (cavalry troopers) raced towards them. Hayes was killed as he tried to ride away while Carey escaped to safety.

== Outbreak of rebellion at Cawnpore ==
There were four Indian regiments in Cawnpore: the 1st, 53rd and 56th Native Infantry, and the 2nd Bengal Cavalry. Although the sepoys in Cawnpore had not rebelled, the European families began to drift into the entrenchment as the news of rebellion in the nearby areas reached them. The entrenchment was fortified, and the Indian sepoys were asked to collect their pay one by one, so as to avoid an armed mob.

The Indian soldiers considered the fortification, and the artillery being primed, as a threat. On the night of 2 June 1857, a British officer named Lieutenant Cox fired on his Indian guard while drunk. Cox missed his target, and was thrown into the jail for a night. The very next day, a hastily convened court acquitted him, which led to discontent among the Indian soldiers. There were also rumours that the Indian troops were to be summoned to a parade, where they were to be massacred. All these factors influenced them to rebel against the East India Company rule.

The rebellion began at 1:30 AM on 5 June 1857, with three pistol shots from the rebel soldiers of the 2nd Bengal Cavalry. Elderly Risaldar-Major Bhowani Singh, who chose not to hand over the regimental colours and join the rebel sepoys, was subsequently cut down by his subordinates. The 53rd and 56th Native Infantry, which were apparently the most loyal units in the area, were awoken by the shootings. Some soldiers of the 56th attempted to leave. The European artillery assumed that they were also rebelling, and opened fire on them. The soldiers of the 53rd were also caught in the crossfire.

The 1st N.I. rebelled and left in the early morning of 6 June 1857. On the same day, the 53rd N.I. also went off, taking with them the regimental treasure and as much ammunition as they could carry. Around 150 sepoys remained loyal to General Wheeler.

After obtaining arms, ammunition and money, the rebel troops started marching towards Delhi to seek further orders from Bahadur Shah II, who had been proclaimed the Badshah-e-Hind ("Emperor of India"). The British officers were relieved, thinking that they would not face a long siege.

== Nana Sahib's involvement ==
Nana Sahib was the adopted heir to Baji Rao II, the former peshwa of the Maratha Confederacy. The East India Company had decided that the pension and honours of the lineage would not be passed on to Nana Sahib, as he was not a natural born heir. Nana Sahib had sent his envoy Dewan Azimullah Khan to London, to petition the Queen against the company's decision, but failed to evoke a favourable response. In May 1857, Nana Sahib arrived in Cawnpore with 300 soldiers, stating that he intended to support the British: Wheeler asked him to take charge of the government treasury in the Nawabganj area.

Amid the chaos in Cawnpore in 1857, Nana Sahib entered the British magazine with his contingent. The soldiers of the 53rd Native Infantry, who were guarding the magazine, were not fully aware of the situation in the rest of the city. They assumed that Nana Sahib had come to guard the magazine on behalf of the British, as he had earlier declared his loyalty to the British, and had even sent some volunteers to be at the disposal of General Wheeler. However, Nana Sahib joined the rebels.

After taking possession of the treasury, Nana Sahib advanced up the Grand Trunk Road. His aim was to restore the Maratha Confederacy under Peshwa tradition, and he decided to attempt to capture Cawnpore. On his way, Nana Sahib met with rebel soldiers at Kalyanpur. The soldiers were on their way to Delhi, to meet Bahadur Shah II. Nana Sahib initially decided to march to Delhi and fight the British as a Mughal subordinate, but Azimullah Khan advised him that leading the rebels in Kanpur would increase his prestige more than serving a weak Muslim king.

Nana Sahib asked the rebel soldiers to go back to Cawnpore, and help him in defeating the British. The rebels were reluctant at first, but decided to join Nana Sahib, when he promised to double their pay and reward them with gold, if they were to destroy the British entrenchment.

== Attack on Wheeler's entrenchment ==
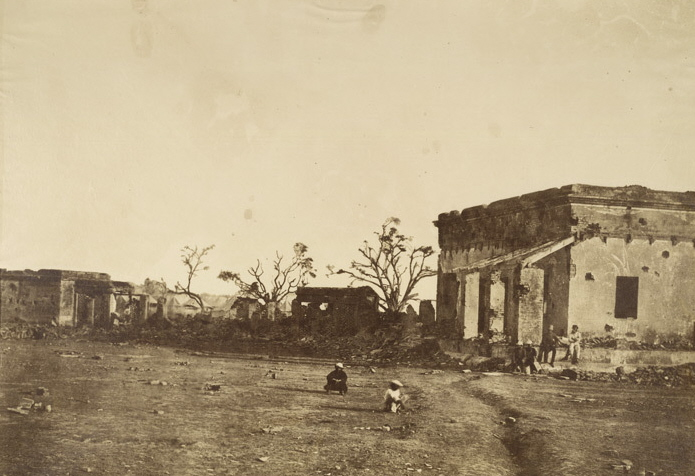
Photograph entitled, "The Hospital in General Wheeler's entrenchment, Cawnpore." (1858) The hospital was the site of the first major loss of British lives in Cawnpore

On 5 June 1857, Nana Sahib sent a polite note to General Wheeler, informing him that he intended to attack on the following morning, at 10 AM. On 6 June Nana Sahib's forces (including the rebel soldiers) attacked the British entrenchment at 10:30 AM. The British were not adequately prepared for the attack, but managed to defend themselves for a long time, as the attacking forces were reluctant to enter the entrenchment. Nana Sahib's forces had been led to falsely believe that the entrenchment had gunpowder-filled trenches that would explode if they approached.

As the news of Nana Sahib's advances against the British garrison spread, several of the rebel sepoys joined him. By 10 June, he was believed to be leading around twelve to fifteen thousand Indian soldiers.

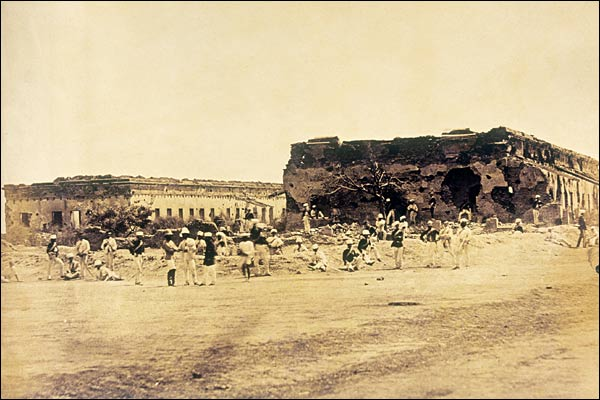
Up to 1,000 British troops, their families and loyal sepoys were holed up in Gen Wheeler's entrenchment in Kanpur for three weeks in June 1857 where they were constantly bombarded by the army of a local prince, Nana Sahib.

The British held out in their makeshift fort for three weeks with little water and food supplies. Many died as a result of sunstroke and lack of water. As the ground was too hard to dig graves, the British would pile the dead bodies outside the buildings, and drag and dump them inside a dried well during the night. The lack of sanitation facilities led to the spread of diseases such as dysentery and cholera, further weakening the defenders. There was also a small outbreak of smallpox, although this was relatively confined.

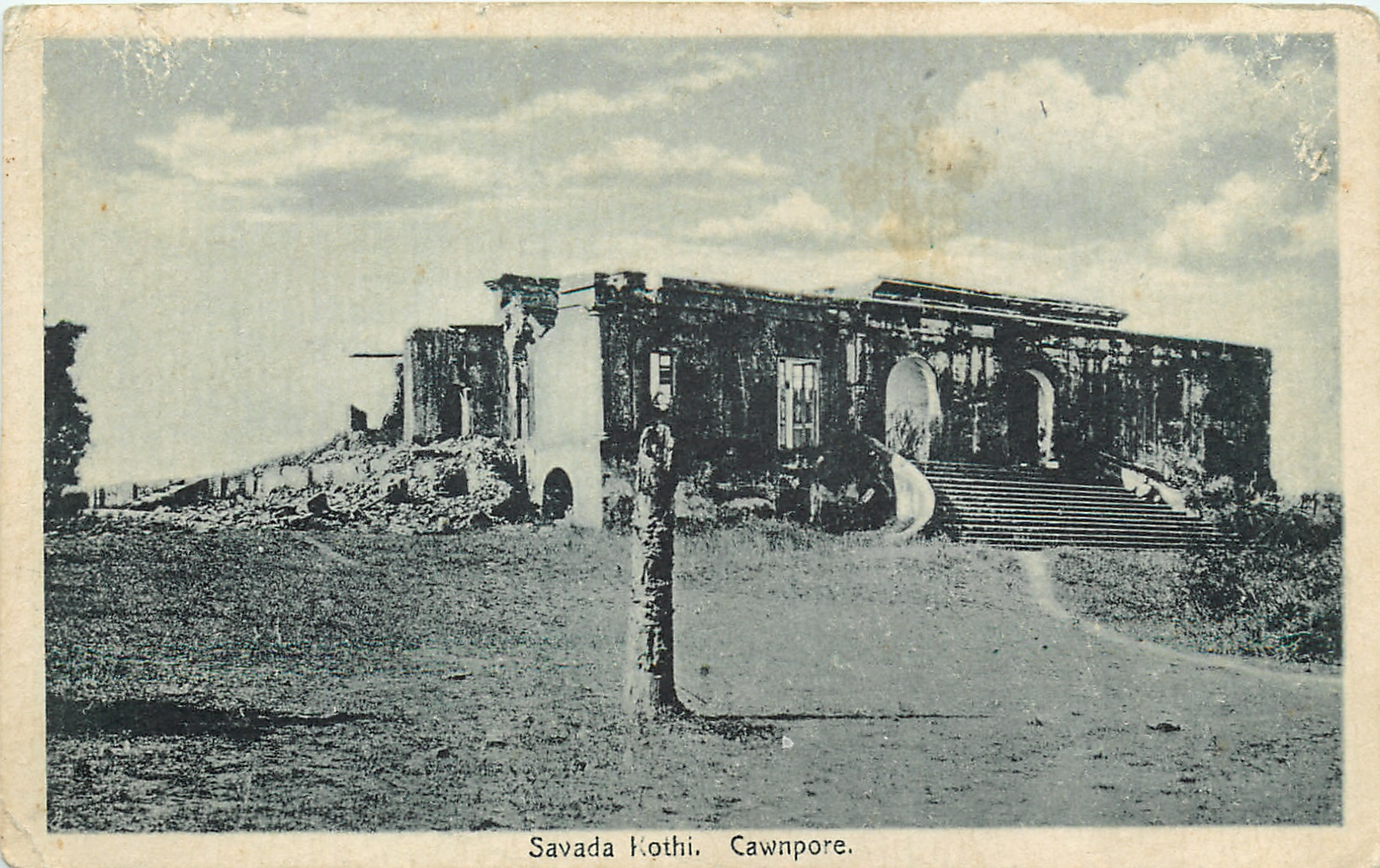
Savada Kothi became a base headquarters for the rebel sepoys

During the first week of the siege, Nana Sahib's forces encircled the entrenchment, created loopholes and established firing positions in the surrounding buildings. Captain John Moore of the 32nd (Cornwall) Light Infantry countered this by launching night-time sorties. Nana Sahib withdrew his headquarters to Savada House (or Savada Kothi), situated about two miles away. In response to Moore's sorties, Nana Sahib decided to attempt a direct assault on the British entrenchment, but the rebel soldiers displayed a lack of enthusiasm.

On 11 June, Nana Sahib's forces changed their tactics. They started concentrated firing on specific buildings, firing endless salvos of round shot into the entrenchment. They successfully damaged some of the smaller barrack buildings and also tried to set fire to the buildings.

The first major assault by Nana Sahib's side took place on the evening of 12 June. However, the attacking soldiers were still convinced that the British had laid out gunpowder-filled trenches, and did not enter the area. On 13 June, the British lost their hospital building to a fire, which destroyed most of their medical supplies and caused the deaths of a number of wounded and sick artillerymen who burned alive in the inferno. The loss of the hospital was a major blow to the defenders. Nana Sahib's forces gathered for an attack, but were repulsed by canister shots from the artillery under the command of Lieutenant George Ashe. By 21 June, the British had lost around a third of their numbers.

Wheeler's repeated messages to Henry Lawrence, the commanding officer in Lucknow, could not be answered as that garrison was itself under siege.

=== Assault on 23 June ===
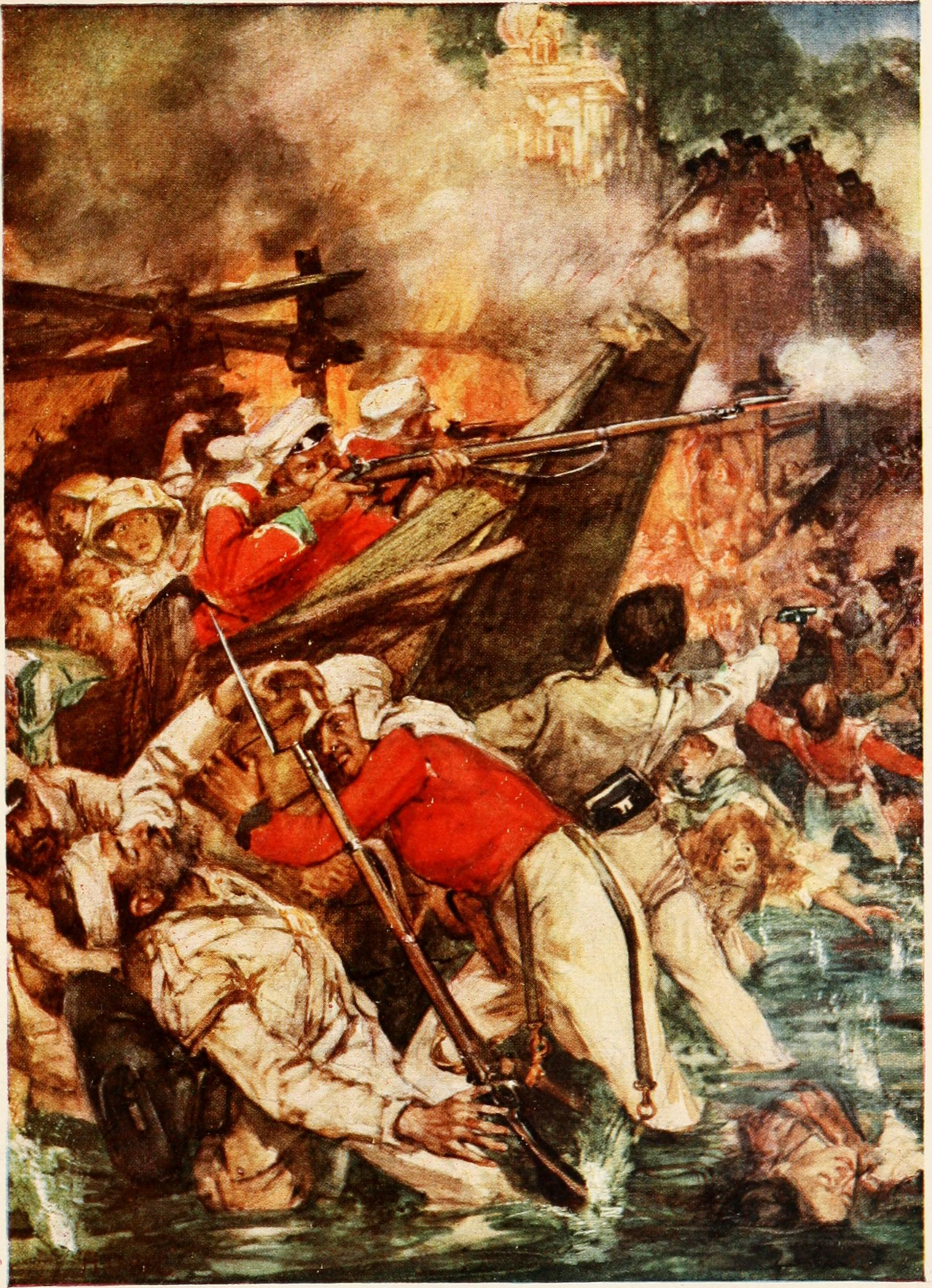
Attack on 23 June 1857

The sniper fire and the bombardment continued until 23 June 1857, the 100th anniversary of the Battle of Plassey, which had taken place on 23 June 1757 and been one of the pivotal battles leading to the expansion of British rule in India. One of the driving forces of the sepoy rebellion was a prophecy of the downfall of East India Company rule in India exactly one hundred years after the Battle of Plassey. This prompted the rebel soldiers under Nana Sahib to launch a major attack on the British entrenchment on 23 June 1857.

The rebel soldiers of the 2nd Bengal Cavalry led the charge but were repulsed with canister shot when they approached within 50 yards of the British entrenchment. After the cavalry assault, the soldiers of the 1st Native Infantry launched an attack on the British, advancing behind cotton bales and parapets. They lost their commanding officer, Radhay Singh, to the opening volley from the British. They had hoped to be protected by cotton bales; however the bales caught fire from the canister shot and became a hazard to them. On the other side of the entrenchment some of the rebel soldiers engaged in hand-to-hand combat against 17 British men led by Lieutenant Mowbray Thomson. By the end of the day the attackers were unable to gain entry into the entrenchment. The attack left more than 25 rebel soldiers dead, with very few casualties on the British side.

== Surrender of the British forces ==
The British garrison had taken heavy losses as a result of successive bombardments, sniper fire and assaults. It was also suffering from disease and low supplies of food, water and medicine. General Wheeler's personal morale had been low after his son Lieutenant Gordon Wheeler had been decapitated by a roundshot. With approval of General Wheeler, a Eurasian civil servant called Jonah Shepherd slipped out of the entrenchment in disguise to ascertain the condition of Nana Sahib's forces. He was quickly imprisoned by the rebel soldiers.

At the same time Nana Sahib's forces were wary of entering the entrenchment since they believed that it had gunpowder-filled trenches. Nana Sahib and his advisers came up with a plan to end the deadlock. On 24 June they sent a European prisoner, Mrs Rose Greenway, to the entrenchment with their message. In return for surrender, Nana Sahib promised the safe passage of the British to the Satichaura Ghat, a landing on the Ganges from which they could depart for Allahabad. General Wheeler rejected the offer because it had not been signed and there was no guarantee that the offer was made by Nana Sahib himself.

The next day, 25 June, Nana Sahib sent a second note, signed by himself, through another elderly female prisoner, Mrs Jacobi. The British camp divided into two groups – one in favour of continuing the defence whilst the second group was willing to trust Nana Sahib. During the next 24 hours there was no bombardment by Nana Sahib's forces. Finally General Wheeler decided to surrender in return for a safe passage to Allahabad. After a day of preparation and burying their dead the British decided to leave for Allahabad on the morning of 27 June 1857.

== Satichaura Ghat massacre ==
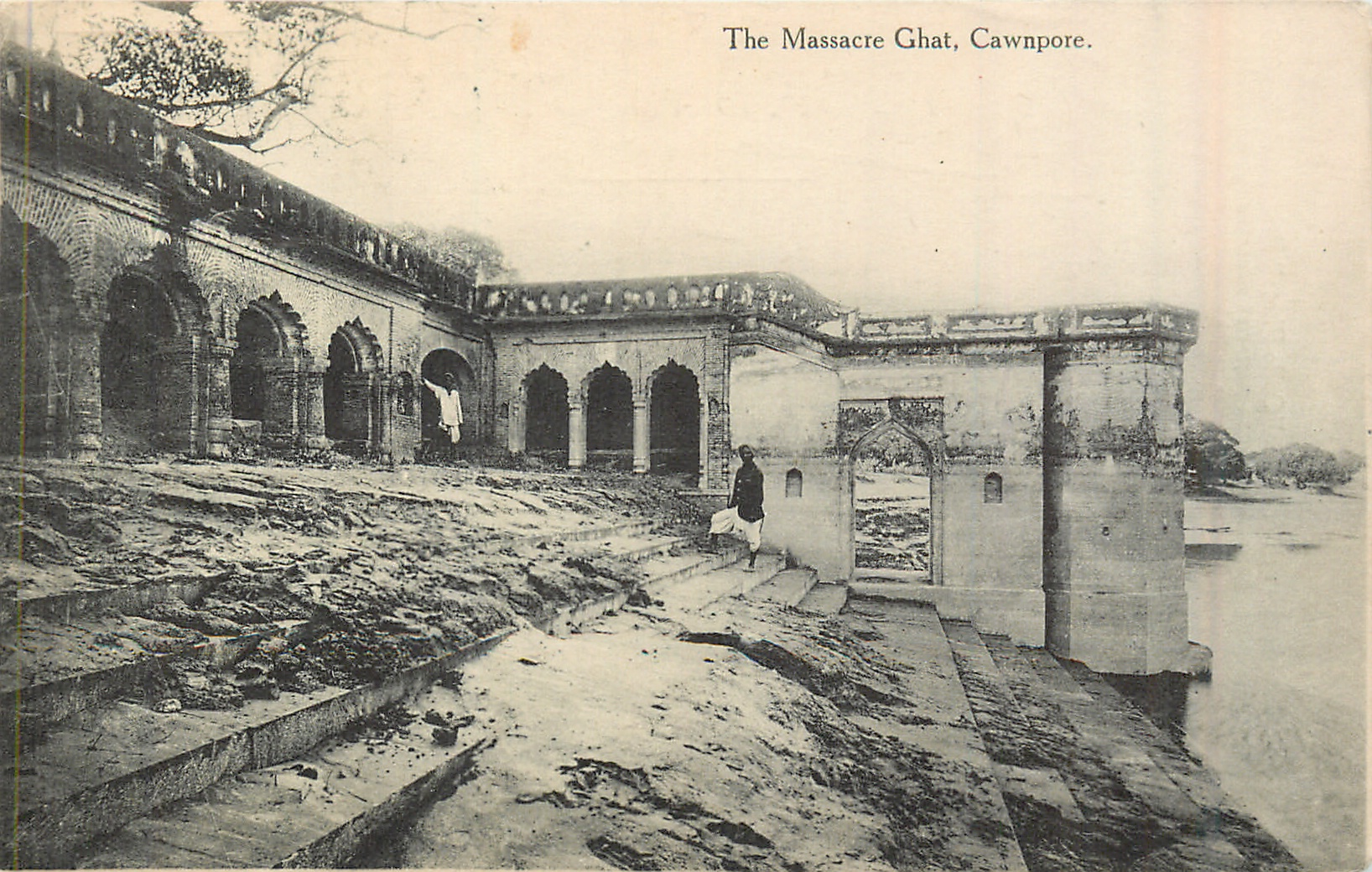
The British boats were stuck on mudbanks preventing departure and, amid much confusion, the soldiers were subsequently captured or massacred by Nana Sahib's rebel army.

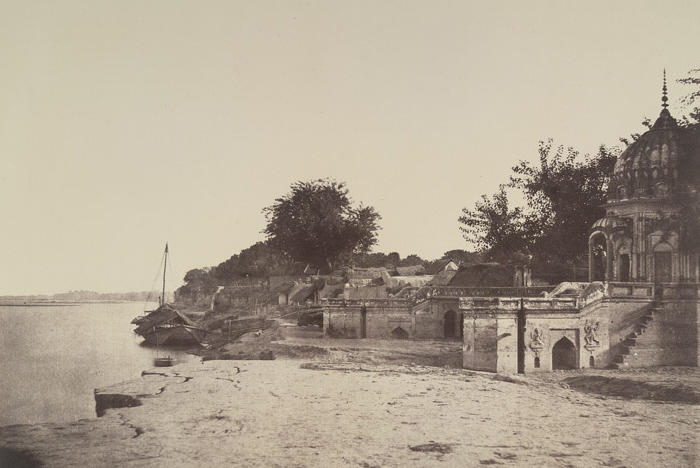
1858 picture of Sati Chaura Ghat on the banks of the River Ganges, where on 27 June 1857 many British men lost their lives and the surviving women and children were taken prisoner by the rebels.

On the morning of 27 June, 500 British led by General Wheeler emerged from the entrenchment. Nana Sahib sent a number of carts, dolis and elephants to enable the women, the children and the sick to proceed to the river banks. The British officers and military men were allowed to take their arms and ammunition with them and were escorted by nearly the whole of the rebel army. The British reached the Satichaura Ghat by 8 am. Nana Sahib had arranged around forty boats, belonging to a boatman called Hardev Mallah, for their departure to Allahabad.

On arrival at the river it was found that there were no planks laid out to enter the boats, forcing the British to wade through the water. The rains had yet to start so the Ganges was low at Satichaura Ghat, beaching the boats on mud making it hard to float the boats away. General Wheeler and his party were the first aboard and the first to manage to set their boat off. As soon as Major Vibart, the final person, was on the last boat and gave the signal "off!" all the boatmen jumped into the water in response after hearing bugles from the banks. The eyewitness testimony of Thomson Mowbray speaks of confusion as firing immediately started from the 15 sepoys who had been with Major Vibart, fires were found set in the thatch of the boats and the British firing at the same time.

Controversy surrounds what exactly happened next at the Satichaura Ghat, whether the signal was a bugle or three shots soon afterwards thousands of sepoys emerged from hidden places on shore to shoot at the boats while they were peppered with artillery. Only three boats managed to set off, men, women and children suffered the same terrible deaths, but the women were spared a massacre of the survivors on shore.

Some of the British officers later claimed that the rebels had placed the boats as high in the mud as possible on purpose to create a trap. They also claimed that Nana Sahib himself had previously arranged for the rebels to fire upon and kill all the British. No evidence has ever been found to prove that Nana Sahib had planned or ordered the initial massacre, later British authors pointing out that Nana rescued seven women who had been captured to be raped RC Majumdar writes that Nana was not present and that the witnesses said it was Tatya Tope who gave the signal to begin, while others claim it was an order to start the boats. Nana had already said that the rebels did not obey him and there is no conclusive proof tying him to this massacre. Pramod Nayar writes that the Satichaura Ghat massacre could be the result of the tense situation and not of any plan. Lieutenant Mowbray Thomson, one of the four men who survived of the massacre, believed that the rank-and-file sepoys who spoke to him did not know of the killing to come.

After the fighting began, Nana Sahib's general Tatya Tope allegedly ordered the 2nd Bengal Cavalry unit and some artillery units to open fire on the British. The rebel cavalry sowars moved into the water to kill the remaining British soldiers with swords and pistols. The surviving men were killed whilst the women and children were taken into captivity since Nana Sahib did not approve of their killing. Around 120 women and children were taken prisoner and escorted to Savada House, Nana Sahib's headquarters during the siege.

Three boats had been able to set off General Wheeler's boat, Major Vibarts and a third which was holed beneath the waterline by a round shot fired from the bank. Two boats drifted to the north bank and the occupants slaughtered. From the crowds being burned, shot and sliced to death some survivors set out to desperately swim to the boats. Mowbray recounts how Vibarts boat took on the survivors from the second, while severely damaged and still being shot at.

The surviving boat had around 100 people aboard, twice the amount there was space for. Severely damaged and without a rudder, it was being pursued along the riverbanks by the rebel soldiers. By midday they were clear of fire as the artillery bullocks had grounded in the mud. The boat frequently grounded on the sandbanks subjecting the survivors to further attacks. The rebels launched a pursuit boat which also grounded and a burning boat hoping to catch the refugees on fire which was defeated by the refugees. On one such sandbank the pursuers struck again. The dying Major Vibart ordered Lieutenant Thomson and two other officers and 11 privates to make a defence while they tried to refloat the boat. After defeating the enemy, Thomson and his men returned to the boat but it had gone.

Meanwhile, the rebels had launched an attack on the boat from the opposite bank. After some firing, the 80 surviving refugees on the boat were recaptured. Returned to Cawnpore the men were all shot dead along with one woman and one infant who refused to leave her husband. The other wives t were pulled away. Nana Sahib granted the request of the chaplain Moncrieff to read prayers before they died. The women and children were confined to Savada House, to be later moved with other survivors to the Bibighar,

Thomson's party had to run barefoot to evade the rebel soldiers. The party took refuge in a small shrine, where Thomson led a last charge. Six of the British soldiers were killed whilst the rest managed to escape to the riverbank, where they tried to escape by jumping into the river and swimming to safety. However a group of rebels from the village started clubbing them as they reached the bank. One of the soldiers was killed whilst the other four, including Thomson, swam back to the centre of the river. After swimming downstream for a few hours they reached shore, where they were discovered by some Rajput matchlockmen who worked for Raja Dirigibijah Singh, a British loyalist. These carried the British soldiers to the Raja's palace. These four British soldiers were the only male survivors from the British side apart from Jonah Shepherd (who had been captured by Nana Sahib before the surrender). The four men included two privates named Murphey and Sullivan, Lieutenant Delafosse and Lieutenant (later Captain) Mowbray Thomson. The men spent several weeks recuperating, eventually making their way back to Cawnpore, which was by that time back under British control. Murphey and Sullivan both died shortly after from cholera, Delafosse went on to join the defending garrison during the siege of Lucknow and Thomson took part in rebuilding and defending the entrenchment a second time under General Windham, eventually writing a firsthand account of his experiences entitled The Story of Cawnpore (London, 1859).

A handful of women were taken prisoner by individual captors, avoiding being placed in the Bibighar and therefore also avoiding the Bibighar massacre. Of these known survivors were Ulrica Wheeler, Amelia Horne, the drummers wives Eliza Bradshaw and Elizabeth Letts, and the twelve year old Eliza Fanthome. Amy Horne, a 17-year-old Anglo-Indian girl, had fallen from her boat and had been swept downstream during the riverside massacre. Soon after scrambling ashore she met Wheeler's youngest daughter, Margaret Frances Wheeler. The two girls hid in the undergrowth for a number of hours until they were discovered by a group of rebels. Margaret was taken away on horseback, never to be seen again. Amy was led to a nearby village, where she was taken under the protection of a Muslim rebel leader in exchange for converting to Islam. Just over six months later she was rescued by Highlanders from Sir Colin Campbell's column on their way to relieve Lucknow.

== Bibi Ghar massacre ==
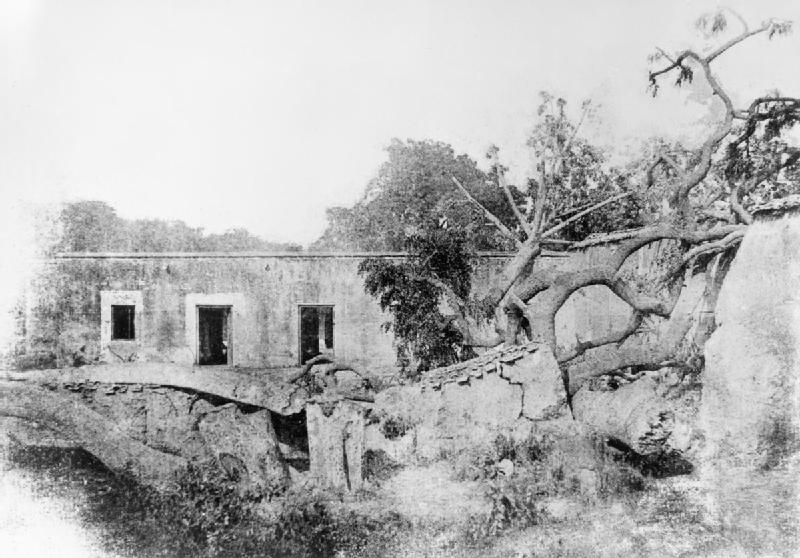
The remains of the Bibi Ghar (the House of the Ladies)

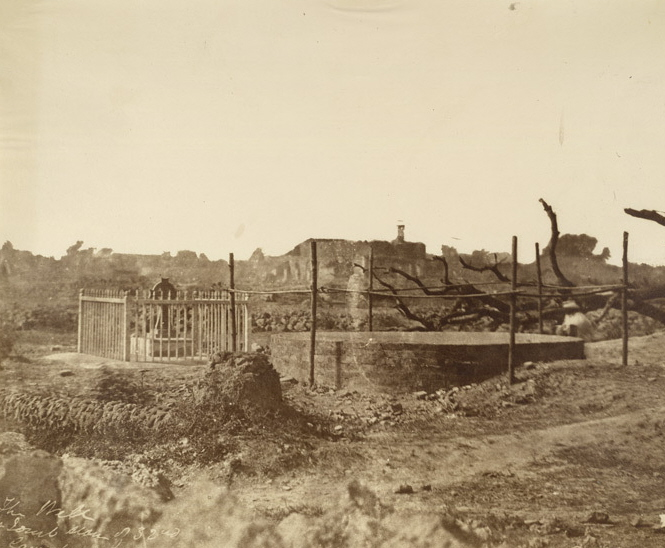
Bibi Ghar house, in the center background, where European women and children were killed, 1858. The well where their bodies were found is in the foreground.

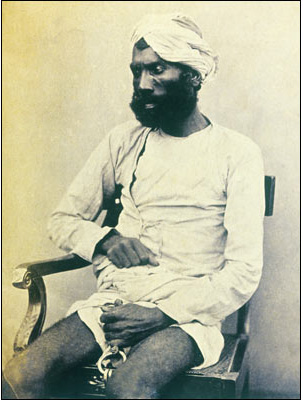
Gungoo Mehter, who was tried at Cawnpore for killing many of the Sati Chaura survivors, including many women and children. He was convicted and hanged at Cawnpore on 8 September 1859.

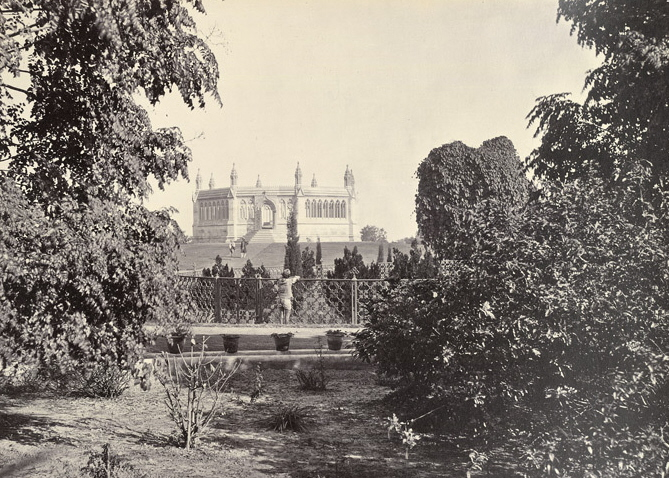
The Bibighar Well site where a memorial had been built by 1859. Samuel Bourne, 1860.

Bibi Ghar was on the edge of Sir George Parker's ruined compound- a magistrate at Cawnpore. The name "Bibi Ghar" is coined from two words, "Bibi" and "Ghar" meaning wife or mistress and house. At the start Mutiny it was occupied by the magistrates Babu. It was 40 by 50 feet, divided into three parts. A small courtyard with rooms at either end with a verrandah surrounding it enclosed in compound walls. The 180 surviving British women and children were moved from Savada House to this small space of 2000 square feet in the July heat.

Initially around 180 women and children were confined to Bibighar. A group of European women and children refugees who survived the Fatehgarh massacre and an others later joined them. In total there were four men and around 200 women and children in Bibighar.

Nana Sahib placed these survivors under the care of the servant of his favourite concubine, earlier a concubine of his brother. Called Hussaini Khanum (or Hussaini Begum) she was highly abusive and made sure no servants could help them. Without soap, clean clothes or bandages for their wounds cholera and dysentery began to kill them. Without any material comforts they could only sing and pray. Every day they would be led out to grind corn - not to eat, but as it was symbolic of the work of a slave to humiliate them.

Fed one meal a day (by the lowest caste) they had no furniture of any kind (already emaciated from surviving the siege). It is said that orders from Delhi were received to improve treatment, a doctor was assigned and they were allowed to go out on the verandah.

Nana Sahib decided to use these prisoners for bargaining with the East India Company. The Company forces, consisting of around 1,000 British, 150 Sikh soldiers, and 30 irregular cavalry, had set out from Allahabad under the command of General Henry Havelock to retake Cawnpore and Lucknow. The first relief force assembled under Havelock included 64th Regiment of Foot and 78th Highlanders (brought back from the Anglo-Persian War), the first arrivals of the diverted China expedition, 5th Fusiliers, part of the 90th Light Infantry (seven companies), the 84th (York and Lancaster) from Burma and EIC Madras European Fusiliers brought up to Calcutta from Madras. Havelock's initial forces were later joined by the forces under the command of Major Renaud and Colonel James Neill, which had arrived in Allahabad from Calcutta on 11 June. Nana Sahib demanded that the East India Company forces under General Havelock and Colonel Neill retreat to Allahabad. However the Company forces advanced relentlessly towards Cawnpore. Nana Sahib sent an army to check their advance. The two armies met at Fatehpur on 12 July, where General Havelock's forces emerged victorious and captured the town.

Nana Sahib then sent another force under the command of his brother, Bala Rao. On 15 July the British forces under General Havelock defeated Bala Rao's army in the Battle of Aong, just outside the village of Aong. On 16 July Havelock's forces started advancing to Cawnpore. During the Battle of Aong, Havelock was able to capture some of the rebel soldiers, who informed him that there was an army of 5,000 rebel soldiers with 8 artillery pieces further up the road. Havelock decided to launch a flank attack on this army but the rebel soldiers spotted the flanking manoeuvre and opened fire. The battle resulted in heavy casualties on both sides but cleared the road to Cawnpore for the British.

On the afternoon of the fifteeenth of July Bala Rao informed Nana that the British had crossed the river and were approaching. After much discussion the advisors agreed to go and confront Havelock, but this left the issue of the prisoners. "..the mighty conquerors of Cawnpore had one more victory to gain. They could slaughter the English prisoners. So, whether it were in rage, or in fear, or in the wantonness of bestial cruelty; whether it were believed that the English were advancing only to rescue the prisoners, and would turn back on hearing that they were dead; whether it were thought that as no tales can be told by the dead, the total annihilation of the captives would prevent the identification of the arch-offenders on the day of retribution; whether the foul design had birth in the depths of the Nana's black heart, or was prompted by one still blacker, the order went forth for the massacre of the women and children in the Beebee-ghur".

The earliest sources concur that Azimoolah persuaded Nana Sahib that the British were only marching to save the woman and children and that the massacre would so upset them that they would retreat and leave India. This is confirmed in other primary sources "When the resolution had been adopted, Teeka Singh asked whether the Nana had made up his mind as to what should be done with the prisoners; and hinted that, in case things went ill, it might be awkward for some then present should the Sahibs bud such a mass of evidence ready to their hands; nay more, that the chances of a reverse would be considerably lessened if the captives were once put out of the way. The British were approaching solely for the purpose of releasing their compatriots, and would not risk another battle for the satisfac¬ tion of burying them. They would be only too glad of an excuse to avoid meeting the Peishwa in the field.

Some modern Indian writers have speculated that news of retributions on rebels elsewhere had prompted the massacre. "It is not far fetched to imagine that news of ...massacres reached the rebel stronghold. They wanted to counter this show of violence by their own exhibition of power". Mukherjee, using post colonial theory blames the British and sees the brutal massacre as justified. Nayer simply says that the approach "provoked" the massacre.

The Royal Widows (the step mothers of Nana by adoption) threatened to throw themselves out of upper windows to death if he committed the massacre of the women and had been on hunger strike to prove sincerity. To spare the complaints they decided to commit the crime quickly that same day - July 15.

At 4 in the afternoon they came for the 3 male refugees from Fatehpur, the merchant and his son and a 14 year old boy. Nana's men led them out on the short walk while the women were confined in the house. Nana had assembled a crowd, sitting in rows while he sat beneath a lime tree wearing a gold turban, All of his advisors were there. Jwala Persad, Tantia Topee, Azimoolah and Bala Rao. As they reached the gate they were shot dead. Their bodies were thrown on the grass and mutilated by the crowd. This continued for half an hour before the Begum informed the women they too were to be killed.

One of the ladies went to ask the commander of the guard if this were true. He said no. He would have been told. One of the guards told the Begum "Your orders will not be obeyed. “ Who are you that you should give orders?" Upon which the Begum went to talk to the Nana. The guards discussed this in her absence and pledged to never murder the women. It is possible that the guard - Yusuf Khan actively pledged to save them (possibly to ensure their own survival when the British arrived. The Begum returned with five men carrying sabres. Two Hindus, one young, one old. Two others were Muslim butchers, wearing white, led by a member of the maharaja's bodyguard wearing his red uniform, named Sarvur Khan, from a distant province. All were armed with tulwars.

The guard sepoys were ordered to fall in. Half a dozen obeyed. They raised their muskets, but shot high at the ceiling of neighbouring apartments. It was the gloaming dusk and the 5 killers entered. In the gloom Survur Khan stepped out of the house, his sword broken, to fetch another, then another. By the time darkness fell the men left and locked up the house. The screams had stopped, but the groans continued until the morning. The next day the sweepers came to throw the bodies into the well. Many of the children had survived and tried to escape, children of 5 or 6. A crowd looked on and the children cried for help. No one helped them. When one went into the crowd they grabbed them and threw them down the well. Three women had survived enough to talk and were also murdered.

An eyewitness later recorded how the 'bodies were dragged out, most of them by the hair of the head. Those who had clothes worth taking were stripped. Some women were alive...there was a great crowd looking on: they were standing in the compound. They were principally city people and villagers. Yes: there were also sepoys. Three boys were alive. They were fair children. The eldest, I think, must have been six or seven, and the youngest five years. They were running round the well, (where else could they go?) and there was none to save them. No: none said a word, or tried to save them.'

Of the 200 women and children hacked to death, or thown alive down the well, 98 were the wives and children of men from the 32nd Foot. Some of the children were physically torn in two by the sepoys. An alternative account is that after the men were murdered, some of the sepoys only agreed to remove the women and children from the courtyard when Tatya Tope threatened to execute them for dereliction of duty. In this account Nana Sahib left "the building" (his position outside the courtyard under the tree) because he didn't want to be a witness to the unfolding massacre.

The British females and children were ordered to come out of the house but they refused to do so and clung to one another. They barricaded themselves in, tying the door handles with clothing. In "Our Bones are Scattered" Ward writes that the soldier could not be compelled to pull them out, so they decided to kill them inside the building. The lack of spectacle making Nana leave.

At first around twenty rebel soldiers opened fire from the outside of the Bibighar, firing through holes in the boarded windows. The soldiers of the squad that was supposed to fire the next round were sickened by the violence caused and discharged their shots into the air. Soon after, upon hearing the screams and groans inside, the rebel soldiers threw down their weapons and declared that they were not going to kill any more women and children.

An angry Begum Hussaini Khanum denounced the sepoys' act as cowardice and asked her aide to finish the job of killing the captives. Her lover hired butchers, who murdered the captives with cleavers, leaving when it seemed that all the captives had been killed. However a few women and children had managed to survive by hiding under the dead bodies. It was agreed that the bodies of the victims would be thrown down a dry well by some sweepers.

No one survived the massacre, 73 women and 124 children were killed.

== Recapture and retaliatory actions by the British ==
The Company forces retook Cawnpore on early in the morning of the 16th July. At first the inhabitants of Cawnpore welcomed the soldiers with great joy, bringing out provisions for the hungry soldiers, but soon they realised that something had changed in them. A young civilian called Jonah Shepherd had been held as a prisoner Putkapur (passing as Indian) with Nana's flight he secured release and joined the 56th & 53rd native Infantry to enter the city and find his family. Loyalists emerged from their hiding places in the nearly deserted city and they directed Lieutenant Ayton and Morsom along with the still shackled boy. He wrote "a strange indescribable something hovered round the place which impressed one with awe and the deepest melancholy. I could not prevail on myself to advance." They opened the doors to be hit by a swarm of flies.

They came to the house at first expecting the captives to be alive, instead finding only blood. Jonah finally came in to look for his family. Some Highlanders followed the trail of blood towards the trees to find Bhudree Nath leaning against the well. Following his gaze they found the bodies. "..the whole of the bodies were naked and the limbs had been separated.." a "mangled heap" of bodies, limbs in various states of putrefaction. A Highlander vomited.

As more soldiers arrived they wandered sobbing through the house, "...ankle-deep in blood. The plaster was scored with sword-cuts: not high up, as where men have fought; but low down, and about the corners, as if a creature had crouched to avoid the blow. Brigadier General Neill wrote at the time; "the bodies of all who died there were thrown into the well of the house, all the murdered also. I saw that house when I first came in. Ladies’ and children’s bloody torn dresses and shoes were lying about, and locks of hair torn from their heads. The floor of the one room they were all. dragged into and killed was saturated with blood. One cannot control one’s feelings. Who could be merciful to one concerned ? Severity at the first is mercy in the end. I wish to show the Natives of India that the punish¬ ment inflicted by us for such deeds will be the heaviest, the most revolting to their feelings, and what they must ever remember" In the courtyard, the tree nearest the well was smeared with the brains of numerous children and infants who had been dashed headfirst against the trunk and thrown down the well. Soon the people of Cawnpore were fleeing down the road to Delhi en masse, not waiting to think whether they could establish their innocence or not.

Neill wrote; "Whenever a rebel is caught he is immediately tried, and, unless he can prove a defence, he is sentenced to he hanged at once: but the chief rebels or ringleaders I make first to clean up a certain portion of the pool of blood, still two inches deep in the shed where the fearful murder and mutilation of the women and children took place. To touch blood is most abhorrent to the high-caste natives. They think, by doing so, they doom their souls to perdition. Let them think so. My object is to inflict a fearful punishment for a revolting, cowardly, barbarous deed, and to strike terror into these rebels. The first I caught was a soubahdar, or native officer, a high-caste Brahmin, who tried, to resist my order to clean up the very u blood he had helped to shed but I made the provost-martial do his duty, and a few lashes soon made the miscreant accomplish his task. When done, he was taken out and immediately hanged, and, after death, buried in a ditch at the road side."

A later text, written by an eye witness but published decades later writes; "On the date of my visit a great part of the house had not been cleaned out; the floors of the rooms were still covered with congealed blood, littered with trampled, torn dresses of women and children, shoes, slippers, and locks of long hair, many of which had evidently been severed from the living scalps by sword-cuts. But among the traces of barbarous torture and cruelty which excited horror and a desire for revenge, one stood out prominently beyond all others. It was an iron hook fixed into the wall of one of the rooms in the house, about six feet from the floor. I could not possibly say for what purpose this hook had originally been fixed in the wall. I examined it carefully, and it appeared to have been an old fixture, which had been seized on as a diabolic and convenient instrument of torture by the inhuman wretches engaged in murdering the women and children. This hook was covered with dried blood, and from the marks on the whitewashed wall, it was evident that a little child had been hung on to it by the neck with its face to the wall, where the poor thing must have struggled for long, perhaps in the sight of its helpless mother, because the wall all round the hook on a level with it was covered with the hand-prints, and below the hook with the foot-prints, in blood, of a little child."

As the army advanced into the city, quarter of the population, loyalists, hidden Europeans, Eurasians and spouses met them with joy. The street outside the police station was thronged with surviving babus desperate to let them know they were not rebels. The Fatehpur magistrate John Sherer set about signing letters of protection for the many Indians who offered sweets, slightly confused by their anxiety. As he approached the Bibighar the crowd fell away. It was he who reported the atrocity to General Havelock and called for workmen to fill in the well.

A steady stream of soldiers came in to see the horror, deeply despondent at the failure of their mission to save people they often knew. By the middle of the morning discipline had broken down, with officers too depressed to enforce order. The common soldiers began to loot the alcohol from the "toddy godowns" belonging to the rebels. Horrified and enraged, engaged in a surge of drunken violence against the population of Cawnpore, including looting and burning houses. What Havelock's biographer called "intoxication, plunder, and rapine". The soldiers drove themselves mad in drink, rumour and tours of the massacre sites. Kaye wrote that the excesses " far greater' than any which are recorded, against them", that the victims were not Nana's people who had fled, but innocents. It was "indiscriminate retribution". The Sikhs in particular plundering widely. Soon General Havelock gave an order “The marauding in this camp exceeds the disorders which supervened on the short lived triumph of the miscreant Nana Sahib. A Provost-Marshal has been appointed, with special instructions to hang up, in their uniform, all British soldiers that plunder. This shall not, be an idle threat. Commanding officers have received the most distinct warnings on the subject.”

Brigadier General Neill, who took the command at Cawnpore, soon began a programme of drumhead court martials for any sepoy rebel captured from the battle. The first soldiers captured continued to make threats and taunts, infuriating the British who expected contrition, not defiance. Not grovelling, instead taking confidence in their religions. Not allowed a defence, some were even gagged. The sepoys were then religiously disgraced by being forced to eat (or force fed) beef (if Hindu) or pork (if Muslim). The Muslim sepoys were sewn into pig skins before being hanged and low-caste street sweepers were employed to execute the high-caste Brahmin rebels to add additional religious disgrace. Muslims were cremated and Hindus were buried.

Most of the prisoners were hanged within direct view of the well at the Bibighar and buried in shallow ditches by the roadside. Others were shot or bayonetted, whilst some were also tied across cannons that were then fired, an execution method initially used by the rebels and the earlier Indian powers, such as the Marathas and the Mughals. It is unclear whether this method of execution was reserved for special prisoners or whether it was merely done in the retributive spirit of the moment. Henry Fane, in a house at Mirzapore 200 miles downriver watched the bodies of dismembered rebels float down the river, execured at Cawnpore. He wondered if such violence would not spur the rebels - still encamped and not defeated at Cawnpore until November - to greater reprisals of their own.

While the British had committed their own reprisals before Cawnpore, it changed their very character with "Remember Cawnpore!" becoming a war cry for the rest of the conflict. Acts of summary violence against towns and cities believed to harbour or support the rebellion also increased. In one of the villages a detachment of Highlanders caught around 140 men, women and children. Ten men were hanged without any evidence or trial. Another sixty men were forced to build the gallows of wooden logs, whilst others were flogged and beaten. In another village, when around 2,000 villagers came out in protest brandishing lathis, the Highlanders surrounded them and set the village on fire. Villagers trying to escape were summarily executed by the Highlanders.

== Aftermath ==
On 19 July, General Havelock resumed operations at Bithoor. Major Stevenson led a group of Madras Fusiliers and Sikh soldiers to Bithoor and occupied Nana Sahib's palace without any resistance. The British troops seized guns, elephants and camels, and set Nana Sahib's palace on fire.

In November 1857, Tatya Tope gathered an army, mainly consisting of the rebel soldiers from the Gwalior contingent, to recapture Cawnpore. By 19 November, his 6,000-strong force had taken control of all the routes west and north-west of Cawnpore. However, his forces were defeated by the Company forces under Colin Campbell in the Second Battle of Cawnpore, marking the end of the rebellion in the Cawnpore area. Tatya Tope then joined Rani Lakshmibai.

Nana Sahib disappeared and, by 1859, he had reportedly fled to Nepal. His ultimate fate was never determined. Up until 1888, there were rumours and reports that he had been captured and a number of individuals turned themselves in to the British claiming to be the aged Nana. As the majority of these reports turned out to be untrue, further attempts at apprehending him were abandoned.

British civil servant Jonah Shepherd, who had been rescued by Havelock's army, spent the next few years after the rebellion attempting to put together a list of those killed in the entrenchment. He had lost his entire family during the siege. He eventually retired to a small estate north of Cawnpore in the late 1860s.

== Memorials ==
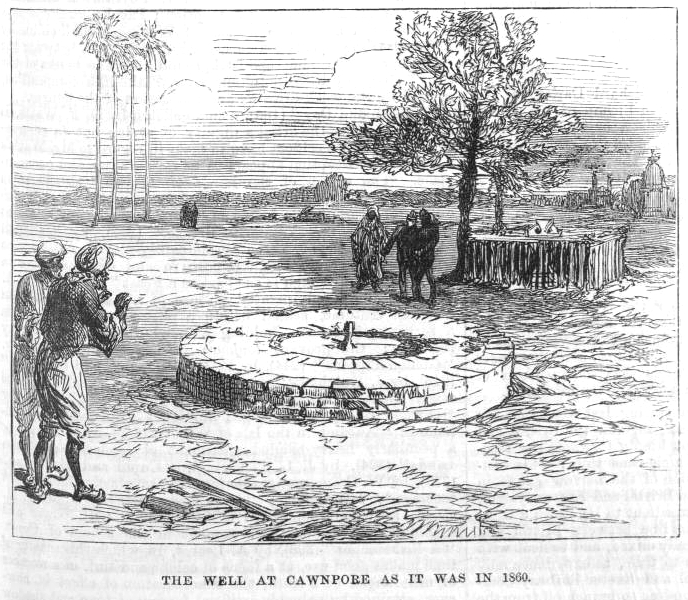
The well as it was in Cawnpore in 1860, The Illustrated London News

After the revolt was suppressed, the British dismantled Bibighar. They raised a memorial railing and cross at the site of the well in which the bodies of the British women and children had been dumped. Meanwhile, the British conducted a retaliatory action under the command of Sir James Outram, 1st Baronet by demolishing Nana Sahib's palace in Bithoor with cannon-fire. In addition, the inhabitants of Cawnpore were forced to pay £30,000 for the creation of the memorial as a 'punishment' for not coming to the aid of the British women and children in Bibighar.

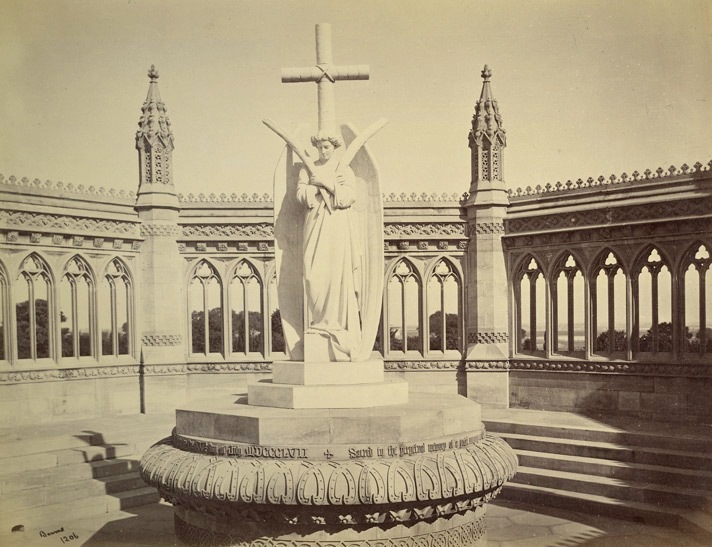
A memorial capping the Bibi Ghar well, was erected c. 1860, by the British after the rebellion was suppressed. The memorial was created by Carlo Marochetti. After India's independence, the memorial was moved to the Memorial Church in Kanpur. Albumen silver print by Samuel Bourne, 1860.

The Angel of the Resurrection was created by Baron Carlo Marochetti and completed in 1865. It has been called by various names throughout the centuries and came to be the most visited statue of British India. The chief proponent and private funder was Charlotte, Countess Canning, wife of the first Viceroy of India, Earl Canning. She approached her childhood friend, Marochetti, for models. In turn, Marochetti suggested that other sculptors be invited. Following the Countess's death, Earl Canning took over the commission. Canning rejected a number of designs accepting, in the end, a version of Marochetti's Crimean War memorial at Scutari, Turkey. The understated figure is an angel holding two branches of palm fronds across her chest. Despite assurances, 'The Angel' had some damage during the Independence celebrations of 1947 and she was later moved from her original site over the Bibi Ghar well to a garden at the side of All Soul's Church, Kanpore (Kanpur Memorial Church).

The remains of a circular ridge of the well can still be seen at the Nana Rao Park, built after Indian independence. The British also erected the All Souls Memorial Church, in memory of the victims. An enclosed pavement outside the church marks the graves of over 70 British men captured and executed on 1 July 1857, four days after the Satichaura Ghat massacre. The marble Gothic screen with "mournful seraph" was transferred to the churchyard of the All Souls Church after Indian independence in 1947. There were originally plans to replace the memorial to the British victims with a bust of Tatya Tope but the local British community objected strongly to the plans, and the bust was eventually installed some distance away from the site.

An additional memorial detailing the losses suffered by the 32nd Cornwall Regiment Light Infantry is located inside the west entrance to Exeter Cathedral.

== Literary references ==
Many references to the event were made in later novels and films. Julian Rathbone describes the brutality of both British and Indian forces during the siege of Cawnpore in his novel The Mutiny. In the novel, the Indian nurse Lavanya rescues an English child, Stephen, during the Satichaura Ghat massacre. In Massacre at Cawnpore, V. A. Stuart describes the siege and the British defence through the eyes of the characters Sheridan, and his wife Emmy. George MacDonald Fraser's Flashman in the Great Game also contains lengthy scenes set in the entrenchment during the siege and also during the ensuing escape. Tom Williams' novel, Cawnpore, is also set against the background of the siege and massacre, which is seen from both the European and the Indian perspective. The contemporary Indian report by Kalpi devi in the local journal Hindupanch covered the incident of the punitive action by the British and burning down of Nana Sahib's palace along with his young daughter, Mainavati.

The British press used it to describe the brutality involved in the public feeding of reptiles at the London zoological garden. In 1876, the editor of the Animal World drew Dr. Philip Sclater's attention to this and the press charged the Zoological Society of London with encouraging cruelty, "pandering to public brutality", while one writer in the Whitehall Review (27 April 1878) protested against "the Cawnpore Massacre enacted diurnally" and headed his article "Sepoyism at the Zoo."

== See also ==
- Second Battle of Cawnpore
- Jallianwala Bagh massacre
- Patharighat massacre
- List of massacres in India
