= Margaret Frances Wheeler =

British woman who was kidnapped

Margaret Frances Wheeler, also known as Ulrica (born 12 August 1837) was a British woman, and the daughter of General Wheeler, who may or may not have survived the Siege of Cawnpore during the Indian Rebellion of 1857. Legends surrounding Margaret became woven into English folklore. One popular 1860 engraving showed her fighting off rebels, while another story claimed she married her Indian captor and remained in Kanpur for years. According to official British records, the Bibighar massacre resulted in no survivors. However, in subsequent years, rumours emerged claiming that Margaret Wheeler survived the massacre.

== Life ==
Margaret Frances Wheeler was born to Hugh Wheeler and his wife Frances Matilda, daughter of East India Company Army officer Frederick Marsden and an Indian woman.

Margaret was portrayed as a heroine in various British fictional accounts of the resistance against the mutineers. A widely circulated 1860 engraving depicted Margaret Wheeler resisting rebel attackers, while another story alleged that she married her Indian captor and resided in Kanpur for an extended period.

One rumour alleged that she executed her captors before committing suicide in an effort to preserve her honour. This account was widely disseminated in the British press and employed as wartime propaganda. Alternative reports suggest she may have died in Nepal while fleeing with Indian rebels.

She experienced the Siege of Cawnpore with her parents and her sister Eliza Matilda Wheeler. Her brother was killed in battle during the siege. During the Satichaura Ghat massacre, her parents and her sister were killed. According to one report, she was abducted ("either captured or rescued") by the sowar Ali Khan, who took her as his captive wife.

=== Surviving the Satichaura Ghat massacre ===
When the British retook Cawnpore, they were informed by an Indian witness that she had survived the Satichaura Ghat massacre. However, the British did not know what had happened to her after her abduction. A rumour was spread that she had killed her kidnapper in self defense, thereafter committing suicide to avoid sexual assault. This version of events was viewed as a heroic act of courage, and was widely described in British press during the Indian rebellion, in which she was praised as a heroine. An image was made of her "Defence of honour", depicting her as a heroine who killed her aggressor (accounts differing between using a sword or a pistol) and then committed suicide while defending herself against rape, and this image was reprinted numerous times and became well known. Margaret Wheeler thus became a prominent figure in the British war propaganda.

=== Possible survival until 1907 ===
Her ultimate fate was never confirmed. G. O. Trevelyan, in his book Cawnpore (1886), recounts the "impudent fabrication" that occurred after the Siege, with the "elastic memory" of "witnesses who will swear to anything" resulting in claims ranging from, on one hand, having seen Miss Wheeler emerging from Ali Khan's quarters carrying a sword and proclaiming her triumph over him, to on the other hand having witnessed her "taken out, dead and swollen" from the well into which by some accounts she cast herself after killing her captors. Trevelyan, identifying Ali Khan as the source of the rumour of Miss Wheeler's defeat of her captor and subsequent suicide, lambasts the "ready credence" with which these varying stories were received in England, "the imaginations of men... excited by a series of prurient and ghastly fictions." Trevelyan states that whilst these heroic stories circulated Miss Wheeler was in fact "living quietly in the family of her master under a Mohammedan name".

Leckey recounts that "a Eurasian named Fitchett" who converted to Islam to save his life during the rebellion, claimed that he "frequently saw Miss Wheeler" at Futteghur, "with a sowar who had taken her from Cawnpore", Fitchett being tasked with reading to them extracts from the English newspapers the rebels received from Calcutta. Fitchett claimed she "had a horse with an English side-saddle", and that she "rode close beside" the sowar "with her face veiled". He claimed that when the British came to Futteghur in 1858, "orders were sent to the sowar to give Miss Wheeler up, but he escaped with her at night." Per Trevelyan, following police inquiries, a conclusion was reached with the "strong conviction" that she had been carried along with the flight of the rebels, and "after being hurried about from camping-ground to camping-ground, had died a natural death in a corner of Nepaul."

Per one account, in 1907 a missionary doctor was called to a Muslim household in the Cawnpore bazaar, where an "old, dying native woman" requested the attendance of a Roman Catholic priest. The woman, "speaking cultured English", claimed to be Miss Wheeler and to have married the Indian who saved her life and treated her kindly.
