= R. Douglas Hurt =

American agricultural historian (born 1946)

Ray Douglas Hurt
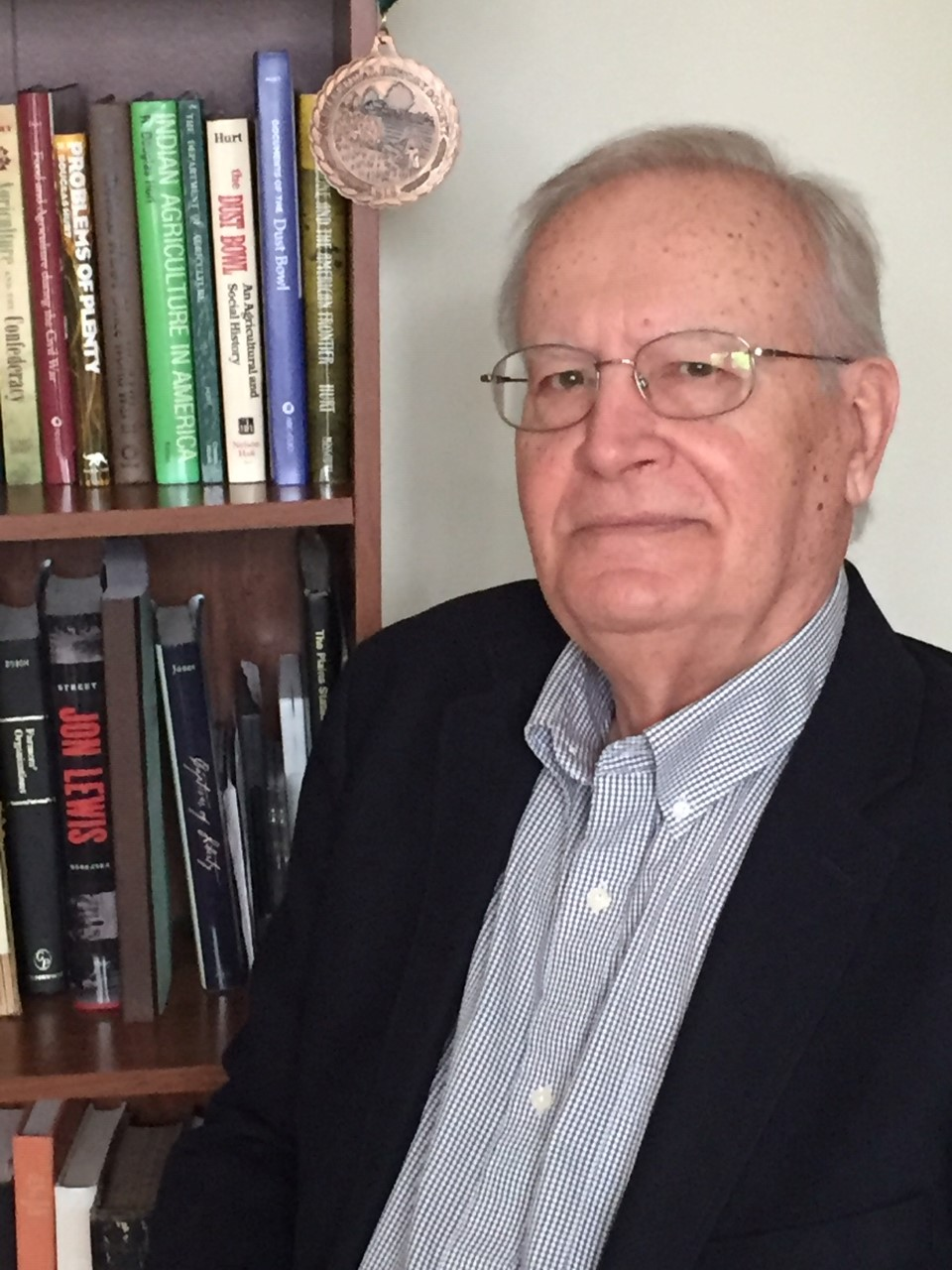
- Born: July 11, 1946 (age 80)
- Occupations: Agricultural historian, academic and author
- Awards: Theodore Saloutos Award, Agricultural History Society, and the Missouri History Book Award, State Historical Society of Missouri, for Agriculture and Slavery in Missouri's Little Dixie; Gladys L. Baker Award for Lifetime Achievement in the Field of Agricultural History, Agricultural History Society

Academic background
- Education: Fort Hays State University (BA 1969, MA 1971); Kansas State University (PhD 1975)

Academic work
- Discipline: Historian
- Sub-discipline: History of agriculture; United States history
- Institutions: Texas Tech University (1977–1978); Ohio State University (1981–1986); University of Missouri - Columbia (1986–1989); Iowa State University (1989–2003); Purdue University (2003–)

Ray Douglas Hurt is an American agricultural historian, academic, and author. He is a professor of history emeritus at Purdue University, where he headed the department of history 2003–2018.

Hurt is known for his research on the Great Plains, the American Civil War, Native Americans, technology, and the American South, West, and Midwest, as well as the Green Revolution. His work places the economic and political aspects of agricultural history in environmental and social context. His books include Agriculture and Slavery in Missouri's Little Dixie (1992), American Agriculture: A Brief History (1994, revised 2002), The Ohio Frontier: Crucible of the Old Northwest, 1720-1830 (1996), The Great Plains during World War II (2008), The Big Empty: The Great Plains in the Twentieth Century (2011), Agriculture and the Confederacy: Policy, Productivity, and Power in the Civil War South (2015), The Green Revolution: Science, Politics, and Unintended Consequences (2020), Agriculture in the Midwest, 1815–1900 (2023), The Country People: An Agricultural History of the American Revolution (2026), and Famine in World History (2027).

Hurt was president of the Agricultural History Society 2000–2001. He has also served as the editor of the Missouri Historical Review, Ohio History, Agricultural History, and The Henry A. Wallace Series on Agricultural History and Rural Life. He has received two lifetime achievement awards for professional history, the 2016 Gladys L. Baker Award of the Agricultural History Society and the 2022 Frederick Jackson Turner Award of the Midwestern Historical Association.

== Early life and education ==
Hurt was born July 11, 1946. He studied at Fort Hays State University and received his bachelor's degree and master's degree in 1969 and 1971, respectively. He then earned his doctoral degree from Kansas State University in 1975. He was a Smithsonian Institution postdoctoral fellow in the History of Science and Technology 1976–1977.

== Career ==
Following his postdoctoral fellowship, Hurt held the position of a visiting assistant professor at Texas Tech University 1977–1978. He then held concurrent appointments as a curator of agricultural history at the Ohio Historical Society (1978–1986) and as an adjunct associate professor of history at the Ohio State University (1981–1986). From 1986 until 1989, he was the associate director of the State Historical Society of Missouri and adjunct professor of history at the University of Missouri - Columbia. He then joined Iowa State University as an associate professor in 1989 and was promoted to professor in 1992. At Iowa State, he was director of the graduate program in agricultural history and rural studies. In 2003, Hurt left Iowa State University to become a professor and head of the department of history at Purdue University. He remained head of the department until 2018, and he retired emeritus.

Hurt has served as a president of the Agricultural History Society (2000–2001). He has also served on award committees for Agricultural History, Ohio Valley History and the Indiana Historical Society, and he has served as the editor of the Missouri Historical Review, Agricultural History (1995–2003), Ohio History (2005–2009), and The Henry A. Wallace Series on Agricultural History and Rural Life.

In 2010, Hurt became a Fellow in the Agricultural History Society. In 2016, Hurt was awarded the Gladys L. Baker Award for lifetime achievement from the Agricultural History Society. In 2022, he was selected to receive the Frederick Jackson Turner lifetime achievement award of the Midwestern Historical Association (MHA). He won the MHA's 2024 Jon Gjerde prize for the best book on the history of the Midwest in the past year, for his Agriculture in the Midwest, 1815–1900 (2023); he is also the namesake of the MHA's R. Douglas Hurt Research Award, which he endowed to support archival research in Midwestern history.

== Research ==
Hurt's research is focused on the Great Plains, American Civil War, Native Americans, technology, and the American South, West, and Midwest, along with the Green Revolution. He has worked on placing the economic and political aspects of agricultural history in an environmental and social context. He also published a paper on the various possibilities and pitfalls regarding museum studies for historians.

=== Agricultural history of America ===
Hurt's work on the agricultural and rural history of America resulted in a book titled American Agriculture: A Brief History, which focused on the major economic, technological and scientific developments regarding American agriculture from the colonial period. Hurt also has analyzed various contributions and studies conducted on American agricultural history and reviewed the discipline of American agricultural history in scholarly publications.

=== Agriculture and Slavery in Missouri's Little Dixie ===
In 1992, Hurt published Agriculture and Slavery in Missouri's Little Dixie, for which he received the 1992 Theodore Saloutos Award of the Agricultural History Society and the 1993 Missouri History Book Award of the State Historical Society of Missouri. The book was reviewed as "a welcome addition to the literature". According to D. Clayton Brown, "students of agricultural history and antebellum history should know this book".

This book has been reviewed as "a solidly researched, informed account that fills a vacant niche in the historical literature". In a review, David E. Schob stated that the book "may well be the best volume published in agricultural history in 1992".

=== The Ohio Frontier: Crucible of the Old Northwest, 1720-1830 ===
Hurt published his book The Ohio Frontier: Crucible of the Old Northwest, 1720–1830 in 1996. The book gathered numerous reviews including a review by E. J. Fabyan that stated that "finally, after nearly twenty-five years, a high quality general history of the frontier period of the state of Ohio is now available". The book is "a dynamic account of the Ohio frontier that should delight both trans-Appalachian frontier scholars and interested amateurs". In another review, the book was stated as "extremely readable and exciting treatments of the region during the eighteenth and nineteenth centuries". Kay J. Carr noted that "readers who are looking for such a straightforward, no-nonsense approach will appreciate his [Hurt's] clarity."

=== The Great Plains during World War II ===
Hurt's book The Great Plains during World War II received the Kansas City Star Noteworthy Book Award and the Choice Outstanding Academic Title in 2008. The book is reviewed as "a thorough analysis of the period from the war's beginning to its conclusion". According to Greg Hall, "his best chapters are those that distinguish the Great Plains experience from that of the rest of the country". Michael W. Schuyler wrote that "This is an outstanding book that will be of interest not only to professional historians but also to general readers with an interest in the history and development of the Great Plains" and that "This is history at its best—both scholarly and fascinating reading—and is indispensable for our understanding of the Great Plains experience during the Second World War". Multiple reviewers noted it as a complement to Gerald D. Nash's World War II and the West (1990) about the Rocky Mountains and West Coast.

=== Agriculture and the Confederacy: Policy, Productivity, and Power in the Civil War South ===
In 2015, Hurt published Agriculture and the Confederacy: Policy, Productivity, and Power in the Civil War South. According to David K. Thomson, Hurt's "focus on an environmental history of the war with a decided fusion with the history of capitalism" sets apart his work from other authors. Louis Ferleger described the book as "Hurt's brilliant analysis" in which he "meticulously examines the pattern of southern agriculture and its impact on southern society".

Hurt's book is also reviewed as "a well-reasoned narrative" and "the first comprehensive study of Confederate agriculture in fifty years", along with "an impressive, and at times dizzying, assessment of all things Confederate agriculture". In a review, Michael Todd Landis stated that "Agriculture and the Confederacy is truly a comprehensive book, and Hurt should be applauded for both the depth of his research and his easy narrative style".

== Bibliography ==
=== Selected books ===
- The Dust Bowl: An Agricultural and Social History (1981) ISBN 0-88229-541-1
- Indian Agriculture in America: Prehistory to the Present (1988) ISBN 978-0-7006-0802-7
- Agriculture and Slavery in Missouri's Little Dixie (1992) ISBN 978-0-8262-0854-5
- The Ohio Frontier: Crucible of the Old Northwest, 1720–1830 (1996) ISBN 978-0-253-33210-3
- Nathan Boone and the American Frontier (1998) ISBN 978-0-8262-1159-0
- The Indian Frontier, 1763–1846 (2002) ISBN 978-0-8263-1965-4
- American Agriculture: A Brief History, rev. ed. (2002) ISBN 1-55753-281-8
- The Great Plains during World War II (2008) ISBN 978-0-8032-2409-4
- The Big Empty: The Great Plains in the Twentieth Century (2011) ISBN 978-0-8165-2970-4
- Agriculture and the Confederacy: Policy, Productivity, and Power in the Civil War South (Civil War America) (2015) ISBN 978-1-4696-2000-8
- Food and Agriculture during the Civil War (2016) ISBN 978-1-4408-0326-0
- Documents of the Dust Bowl: Eyewitness to History (2019) ISBN 978-1-4408-5497-2
- The Green Revolution in the Global South: Science, Politics, and Unintended Consequences (NEXUS) (2020) ISBN 978-0-8173-2051-5
- Agriculture in the Midwest, 1815–1900 (2023) ISBN 978-1-4962-3349-3

The Country People: An Agricultural History of the American Revolution (2026) ISBN 9780820377209 Famine in World History (2027) ISBN 978-1-032-98105-5

=== Selected articles ===
- Hurt, R. D. (2004). "Reflections on American Agricultural History." Agricultural History Review, 1–19.
- Hurt, R. D. (2004). "The Agricultural and Rural History of Kansas: Review Essay." Kansas History: A Journal of the Central Plains, 27, 194–217.
- Hurt, R. D. (2008). "Agricultural Politics in the Twentieth-Century West," in The Political Culture of the New West, 51–73.
- Hurt, R. D. (2013). "The Agricultural Power of the Midwest during the Civil War," in Union Heartland: The Midwestern Home Front during the Civil War, 68–96.
- Hurt, R. D. (2016). "Teaching Agricultural History at Land-Grant Universities," in Service as Mandate: How American Land-Grant Universities Shaped the Modern World, 1920–2015, 314–30.
- Hurt, R. D. (2025). "Midwestern Farming Past and Present," in Between Loving and Leaving: Essays on the New Midwestern History, 21–32.
