= David B. Danbom =

American historian and author (1947–2026)

- Born: March 29, 1947; Denver, Colorado, U.S.
- Died: June 26, 2026 (aged 79)
- Occupations: Historian and author

Academic background
- Education: Colorado State University (BA 1969); Stanford University (PhD 1974)

Academic work
- Discipline: Historian
- Sub-discipline: History of agriculture
- Institutions: North Dakota State University (1974–2010)

David B. Danbom (March 29, 1947 – June 26, 2026) was an American historian and author. He was a professor of agricultural history at North Dakota State University 1974–2010. He served as president of the Agricultural History Society 1990–1991 and was awarded its Gladys L. Baker Award for lifetime achievement in 2014.

== Early life and education ==
Danbom was born in Denver, Colorado, on March 29, 1947. He received his degree in history at Colorado State University in 1969 and graduated with his PhD from Stanford University in 1974.

== Career ==
After graduation, he began his teaching career at North Dakota State University in 1974, where he remained until retiring emeritus in 2010. He authored several books and many articles focused on agriculture and the history of agriculture in the rural west; he has been the recipient of several teaching awards and was named distinguished professor.

Danbom was president of the Agricultural History Society 1990–1991. He was made a fellow of the society in 2009, and in 2014, he received the society's Gladys L. Baker Award for lifetime achievement in the field of agricultural history.

Danbom spent nine years on the Fargo Historic Preservation Commission. He participated in a discussion on the history of the North Dakota Agricultural Experiment Station and its activities in 1990, and he answered questions during the event.

He was a frequent contributor to the Fargo Forum newspaper, writing more than 100 opinion editorial columns, until his retirement, when he and his wife, Karen, moved to Loveland, Colorado, in 2011.

== Death ==
Danbom died on June 26, 2026.

== Selected works ==
=== Books ===
- Born in the Country: A History of Rural America, Johns Hopkins University Press, 2017.
- Bridging the Distance: common issues of the rural West, co-authored with the Bill Lane Center for the American West, University of Utah, 2015.
- Going it Alone: Fargo Grapples with the Great Depression, Minnesota Historical Society Press, 2005.
- Fargo, North Dakota: 1870-1940, co-authored with Claire Strom, Arcadia Pub., 2002.
- Our Purpose Is to Serve: The First Century of the North Dakota Agricultural Experiment Station, North Dakota Institute for Regional Studies, 1990.
- "The World of Hope": Progressives and the Struggle for an Ethical Public Life, Temple University Press, 1987.
- The Resisted Revolution: Urban America and the Industrialization of Agriculture, 1900-1930, Iowa State University Press, 1979.

=== Dissertation Thesis ===
The Industrialization of Agriculture, Ph.D. Department of History, Stanford University, 1974.

== Teaching awards ==
- 1985, 1990, 1997 Mortar Board Preferred Professor
- 1990 Burlington Northern Faculty Achievement Award
- 1990 Council for the Advancement and Support of Education (CASE) North Dakota Professor of the Year
- 1998 North Dakota State University Faculty Lectureship Award.
- 2002 Arts, Humanities, and Social Sciences Outstanding Educator Award
- 2013 North Dakota State University College of Liberal Arts, Distinguished Alumnus Award

== See also ==
- Borish, Linda J. "Book Reviews." Technology and Culture, Vol. 38, No. 3 (Jul., 1997), pp. 799–801.
- Beltman, Brian W. The Journal of Southern History, Vol. 63, No. 1 (Feb., 1997), pp. 220–222.
