= Gilbert Fite =

American historian and university president (1918–2010)

- Born: May 14, 1918; Santa Fe, Ohio, US
- Died: July 13, 2010 (aged 92); Fort Myers, Florida, US
- Burial place: Memorial Gardens, First Christian Church; 35.2178°N 97.446°W
- Occupations: Historian and university president
- Known for: The Farmers' Frontier: 1865–1900 (1977); Cotton Fields No More: Southern Agriculture, 1865–1980 (1984)
- Spouse: Alberta June Goodwin (m. 1941)

Academic background
- Education: University of South Dakota (BA & MA 1941); University of Missouri (PhD 1945)
- Thesis: Peter Norbeck: Prairie Statesman (1948)
- Doctoral advisor: Elmer Ellis; Lewis F. Atherton

Academic work
- Discipline: Historian
- Sub-discipline: History of agriculture in the United States
- Institutions: University of Oklahoma (1945–1971); Eastern Illinois University (1971–1976); University of Georgia (1976–1986)

Gilbert Courtland Fite (May 14, 1918 – July 13, 2010) was an American historian and university president known for his work on the history of agriculture in the United States. He was a professor at the University of Oklahoma 1945–1971, then president of Eastern Illinois University from 1971 to 1976, and next held the Richard B. Russell Chair in American History at the University of Georgia until his retirement in 1986.

Fite's books included works on how farmers affected the political environment and broader economic history of the United States, examining the political power that farmers wielded in various eras. His best known books in agricultural history included The Farmers' Frontier, 1865–1900 (1977), American Farmers: The New Minority (1981), and Cotton Fields No More: Southern Agriculture, 1865–1980 (1984). He was president of the Agricultural History Society 1960–1961, of the Southern Historical Association in 1974, of the Western History Association 1985–1986, and of Phi Alpha Theta 1981–1983.

== Early life and education ==
Fite was born on May 14, 1918, in Santa Fe, Ohio, to a couple of poor homesteaders, Fite spent his childhood and teenage years in western South Dakota. He graduated from a Free Methodist secondary school in Wessington Springs, South Dakota, and attended Wessington Springs Junior College. By 1937, Fite attended Seattle Pacific College until medical issues forced him to attend an institution closer to his family's farm. He enrolled in the University of South Dakota at Vermillion, SD, and graduated with both his bachelor's degree and master's degree in history in 1941 under advisors Herbert S. Schell and Bert Loewenberg.

In the spring of 1945, he earned his Ph.D. in history from the University of Missouri with a dissertation on South Dakota governor and senator Peter Norbeck later published as Peter Norbeck: Prairie Statesman (1948). His advisors were Elmer Ellis and economic historian Lewis F. Atherton.

== Career ==
In 1945, Fite began teaching at the University of Oklahoma alongside other prominent historians such as Edward Everett Dale and Carl Rister. During his early years at the institution, Fite published numerous articles and monographs, including the first major study of the Mount Rushmore National Monument. He took a Ford Fellowship 1954–1955 to study economics at Harvard University, and won a Guggenheim Fellowship in 1964. He served as chair of the history department 1955–1958 and rose to the named chair of George Lynn Cross Research Professor in 1968.

While at Oklahoma, Fite also took two year-long trips to serve as visiting professor in India. For 1962–1963 he taught at Jadavpur University in Kolkata, and for 1969–1970, he was director of the American Studies Research Center at Osmania University in Hyderabad.

In 1971, he took over the position of college president at Eastern Illinois University. He was president of the institution 1971–1976, where he guided it through a budget crisis and expanded the university, after which he took the Richard B. Russell Chair in American History at the University of Georgia. While at Georgia, Fite authored more monographs on agricultural history, including Cotton Fields No More: Southern Agriculture, 1865–1980, which won the Theodore Saluoutos Award for the best book in agricultural history in 1985. Fite retired from teaching in 1986 but continued to research and write on agricultural history.

In addition to his teaching and research, Fite held numerous leadership positions in various historical societies. He was president of the Agricultural History Society from 1960 to 1961, of the Southern Historical Association in 1974, of the Western History Association from 1985 to 1986, and of Phi Alpha Theta from 1981 to 1983. In 1990, he entered the South Dakota Hall of Fame. He was among the first honorary fellows of the Agricultural History Society in 1995, and in honor of his influence in shaping American agricultural history, in 2000 the Agricultural History Society created an annual award for the best dissertation on agricultural history named after Fite.

== Personal life and death ==
In 1939, Fite met Alberta June Goodwin while in a hospital in Mitchell, South Dakota. The two married on July 24, 1941, and later had two sons.

Fite died on July 13, 2010, in Fort Myers, Florida.

== Writings ==
In total, Fite authored, co-authored, or edited over eighteen monograph-length works and fifty articles.

=== Political figures ===
Fite's first work, an expansion of his doctoral thesis, was an investigation into how Peter Norbeck, a South Dakota politician, helped secure federal support for agricultural programs and the Mount Rushmore National Monument. In 1954, he published a book on George Peek titled George N. Peek and the Fight for Farm Parity. In 1991, he completed a biography of Richard B. Russell, Jr., a Georgia politician who was namesake for the named chair that he occupied at the University of Georgia.

=== Agricultural history ===
Fite's greatest impact to American historiography came in the field of agricultural history. Most of his historical analyses focused on either farming impacted the direction of the United States or how farmers and farming communities responded to larger societal changes in American life. The most prominent of these works are The Farmers' Frontier, 1865–1900, American Farmers: The New Minority, and Cotton Fields No More: Southern Agriculture, 1865–1980.

Fite's The Farmers' Frontier, 1865–1900 focused on the development of the Great Plains region during the latter part of the 19th century. In the work, Fite rebuked the environmental determinism set up in Walter Prescott Webb's The Great Plains and instead argued that it was the people—farmers in this instance—that shaped the culture of the Great Plains environment rather than the other way around. Fite's work was one of the first to bring ideas of historical agency to those who chose to live in the Great Plains while also explaining how agriculture became the dominant economic engine of the region due to decisions made by these early American settlers.

Two other influential works by Fite regarding American agricultural history were American Farmers: The New Minority (1981) and Cotton Fields No More: Southern Agriculture, 1865–1980 (1984). Both books focused on how the political and economic power of agricultural peoples shrank in the nineteenth and twentieth centuries. In American Farmers, Fite argued that those who made their livelihoods on agriculture held less power at the end of the twentieth century than in the early decades of the century due to increased farm consolidation and greater technological innovation, which put more money into the pockets of a select few who were fortunate or smart enough to keep expanding. Additionally, this new economic environment coupled with political changes and a decline in the cultural myth of Jeffersonian agrarianism to shift political attention away from farmers and farming political organizations. Cotton Fields No More continued this analysis, shifting focus to the southern United States after the Civil War and arguing in a similar vein that political and technological changes caused small-scale farmers to leave agriculture. Cotton Fields No More won the Agricultural History Society's 1984 Theodore Saloutos Award for Best Book in Agricultural History.

== Selected works ==
- Fite, Gilbert C. Peter Norbeck: Prairie Statesman. Columbia: University of Missouri Press, 1948.
- Fite, Gilbert C. Mount Rushmore. Norman: University of Oklahoma Press, 1952.
- Fite, Gilbert C. George N. Peek and the Fight for Farm Parity. Norman: University of Oklahoma Press, 1954
- Haystad, Lee and Gilbert C. Fite. The Agricultural Regions of the United States. Norman: University of Oklahoma Press, 1963.
- Fite, Gilbert C. The Farmers’ Frontier. 1865–1900. Albuquerque: University of New Mexico Press, 1977.
- Fite, Gilbert C. American Farmers: The New Minority. Bloomington: Indiana University Press, 1981.
- Fite, Gilbert C. Cotton Fields No More: Southern Agriculture, 1865–1980. Lexington: University Press of Kentucky, 1984.
- Fite, Gilbert C. and Jim E. Reese. An Economic History of the United States. Boston: Houghton Mifflin, 1973.
- Fite, Gilbert C. Richard B. Russell, Jr.: Senator from Georgia. Chapel Hill: University of North Carolina Press, 1991.
