= Joan M. Jensen =

American historian (born 1934)

- Born: December 9, 1934 (age 91); Saint Paul, Minnesota, U.S.
- Occupation: Historian

Academic background
- Education: Pasadena City College; University of California, Los Angeles (BA 1957, MA 1959, PhD 1962)

Academic work
- Discipline: Historian
- Sub-discipline: Women's history; American history; History of agriculture
- Institutions: U.S. International University (1962–1971); New Mexico State University (1976–1994)

Joan Maria Jensen (born December 9, 1934) is an American historian best known for her work in North American women's history and agricultural history. She is professor emerita at New Mexico State University, where she played a founding role in the women's studies program. The Jensen-Miller Award of the Coalition for Western Women's History is named in her honor. She has served as president (1992–1993) and fellow (1995–) of the Agricultural History Society and was awarded its lifetime achievement award in 2012.

== Early life and education ==
Jensen was born December 9, 1934 in Saint Paul, Minnesota. She attended Pasadena City College and then transferred to the University of California, Los Angeles, where she earned a B.A. (1957), an M.A. (1959), and a Ph.D. (1962).

== Career ==
From 1962 to 1971, Jensen taught at U.S. International University in San Diego, California. She left this job to join a farming commune in southern Colorado. From 1974 to 1975, she taught as a visiting professor at Arizona State University, and from 1975 to 1976 she taught as visiting professor at UCLA.

She next taught history at New Mexico State University 1976–1994, when she became professor emerita. Jensen suggested creating the university's Women's Studies program in 1988 and served as its founding director in 1989. Her 1988 book on the history of women of the Mid-Atlantic around the time of the American Revolution and before the Civil War, Loosening the Bonds: Mid-Atlantic Farm Women, 1750–1850, was nominated for a Pulitzer Prize and was awarded the Sierra Prize of the Western Association of Women Historians.

In 1990, the Coalition for Western Women's History honored Jensen by creating the Jensen-Miller Award for the best scholarly article published in the preceding year in the field of women and gender in the trans-Mississippi West.

In 1992–1993, Jensen served as president of the Agricultural History Society.

== Awards ==
- 2012 Gladys L. Baker Award for lifetime achievement from the Agricultural History Society
- 2007 Merle Curti Award Honorable Mention for Calling This Place Home: Women on the Wisconsin Frontier, 1850–1925 (Minnesota Historical Society Press)
- 1995 fellow of the Agricultural History Society
- 1993 New Mexico Endowment for the Humanities Award for Excellence in the Humanities.
- Western Association of Women Historians Sierra Prize, for Loosening the Bonds: Mid-Atlantic Farm Women, 1750–1850
- Old Sturbridge Village Research Library Society E. Harold Hugo Memorial Book Prize, for Loosening the Bonds: Mid-Atlantic Farm Women, 1750–1850
- New Mexico Presswomen’s Zia Award and the Governor’s Award for Historic Preservation, for New Mexico Women: Intercultural Perspectives

== Works ==
- Jensen, Joan M. (1968). The Price of Vigilance. Chicago: Rand McNally.
- Jensen, Joan M. (1975). Military surveillance of civilians in America. General Learning Press. OCLC 15131007.
- Jensen, Joan M. (1980). The gentle tamers revisited: New approaches to the history of women in the American West. Pacific Historical Review. OCLC 711904746.
- Jensen, Joan M. (July 1980). "Cloth, butter and boarders: women's household production for the market". Review of Radical Political Economics. 12 (2): 14–24. doi:10.1177/048661348001200203. S2CID 154584305.
- Jensen, Joan M. (1981). With these hands: women working on the land. Feminist Press. ISBN 978-0912670904. "Joan M. Jensen."
- Jensen, Joan M. (1981). Women's work along the Southwest border: A significant aspect of labor history. Tucson, Arizona: Southwest Institute for Research on Women. OCLC 8897362.
- Jensen, Joan M.; Scharf, Lois (1983). Decades of discontent: The women's movement, 1920–1940. Westport, Connecticut: Greenwood Press. ISBN 978-0313226946.
- Jensen, Joan M.; Davidson, Sue (1984). A needle, a bobbin, a strike: Women needleworkers in America. Temple University Press. ISBN 978-0877224075.
- Jensen, Joan M.; Miller, Darlis A., eds. (1986). New Mexico Women: Intercultural Perspectives. Albuquerque: University of New Mexico Press. ISBN 978-0826308269. OCLC 241487465.
- Jensen, Joan M.; Lothrop, Gloria Ricci (1987). California women: A history. San Francisco, California: Boyd & Fraser Publishing Co. ISBN 978-0878351565. OCLC 17017302.
- Jensen, Joan M. (1988). Passage from India: Asian Indian immigrants in North America. New Haven London: Yale University Press. ISBN 978-0878351565.
- Jensen, Joan M. (1988). Loosening the Bonds: Mid-Atlantic Farm Women, 1750–1850. New Haven: Yale University Press. ISBN 978-0300042658.
- Jensen, Joan M. (1991). Promise to the land: Essays on rural women. Albuquerque: University of New Mexico Press. ISBN 978-0826312471.
- Jensen, Joan M. (1991). Army Surveillance in America: 1775–1980. New Haven London: Yale University Press. ISBN 978-0300046687. "Joan M. Jensen army surveillance."
- Jensen, Joan M. (1992). Naming a price, finding a space: The marketplace for western women's art. Tucson, Arizona: Southwest Institute for Research on Women. OCLC 28864925.
- Jensen, Joan M.; Osterud, Nancy Grey (1994). American rural and farm women in historical perspective. University of California Press. OCLC 33316596. Agricultural History Society: National Conference on American Rural and Farm Women in Historical Perspective.
- Jensen, Joan M. (1995). One Foot on the Rockies. Albuquerque: University of New Mexico Press. ISBN 978-0826315397. "Joan M. Jensen one foot rockies."
- Jensen, Joan M. (2000). Native American Women Photographers as Storytellers. Las Cruces: New Mexico State University. OCLC 5254630.
- Jensen, Joan M. (2006). Calling This Place Home: Women on the Wisconsin Frontier, 1850–1925. St. Paul: Minnesota Historical Society Press. ISBN 978-0873515634.
