= Mary W.M. Hargreaves =

American historian (1914–2008)

- Born: Mary Wilma Massey; March 1, 1914; Erie, Pennsylvania
- Died: August 29, 2008 (aged 94); Lexington, Kentucky
- Education: Bucknell University (A.B. 1935), Radcliffe College/Harvard University (M.A. 1936, Ph.D. 1951)
- Spouse: Herbert Walter "Walt" Hargreaves (d. 1998)

Mary Wilma Massey Hargreaves (March 1, 1914 – August 29, 2008) was an American historian who was the first woman at the University of Kentucky to reach the rank of full professor in the Department of History. Her areas of research included the agricultural history of the Northern Great Plains, dryland agriculture, and land utilization. She was a Brookings Institution scholar, an editor of the Henry Clay Papers, and a servant in leadership roles in the Organization of American Historians and the Southern Historical Association; in 1975 she was elected president of the Agricultural History Society. She also served as a local and state officer in the American Association of University Women.

== Early life and academic background ==
Born on March 1, 1914, in Erie, Pennsylvania, Mary Wilma Massey was an only child. She attended East High School, and she enjoyed swimming as well as track and field sports. An excellent student she won a full scholarship to Bucknell University and graduated in 1935 with a triple major in history, English and the social studies. She earned her master's degree in history from Radcliffe College/Harvard University in 1936, and she served as a research editor at the Harvard University School of Business Administration. She began her work on the Ph.D. as a doctoral candidate at Radcliffe writing about settlement in the American West, working under an exponent of the thesis of Frederick Jackson Turner – mentored by Harvard historian Frederick Merk. While at Harvard in 1939, she became a junior fellow at the Brookings Institution, a liberal think tank in Washington, D.C.

== Marriage and a career on hold ==
At Brookings, she met Herbert Walter "Walt" Hargreaves, who was finishing up his Ph.D. in economics from Duke University. They married on August 24, 1940, and she followed her husband when he was hired to teach at what is now the University of Texas at El Paso. Walt Hargreaves joined up during World War II, and they moved to various posts for his training. He served also as a member of the economic reconstruction delegation to Germany, and for most of the war she lived in Brooklyn, New York. Soon after the war, Walt Hargreaves was hired as a professor of economics at the University of Kentucky in Lexington.

When they arrived in Kentucky, Mary Wilma Hargreaves met Thomas D. Clark in the History Department who invited her to guest lecture in his classes on American land policy, the subject of her dissertation. Finally, in 1951, Mary Wilma Hargreaves earned her Ph.D. in history from Harvard University. She applied for a job in the university's History Department, but instead was hired as a typist for James F. Hopkins who had been working on gathering the letters and works of Henry Clay for a bound series. By 1957 with a grant from the Eli Lilly Endowment and sponsored as part of a program by the National Archives and Records Division, Hopkins was appointed editor-in-chief of the Henry Clay Papers and Hargreaves was hired as associate editor. Together they edited the first five volumes of the series.

== Career as historian ==
Hargreaves was finally hired as a professor in the University of Kentucky History Department in 1964 to teach courses on the American frontier and economic history of the U.S. She remained associate editor of the Henry Clay Papers until 1974 when she then became co-editor and project director. She was promoted to full professor in 1973 - the first woman in the department's history to do so.

She wrote three major works, two of which focused on the economic history of the agricultural practices used in the high plains, with interpretations on the formation of national land policy and the socioeconomic problems associated with that. Her book Dry Farming the Northern Great Plains, 1900-1925 (Harvard, 1957) was a part of the prestigious Harvard Economic Studies series (Volume 101) and went through nine editions.

By the 1970s she was writing important groundbreaking articles to update and expand upon her original work on the history of the American west, broadening her analysis to include studies of women's critical roles in agriculture and the settlement of the Great Plains. She followed in Thomas D. Clark's footsteps when she won the Theodore Hallam Professor Award of the UK History Department for outstanding achievement. In 1975, she served as president of the Agricultural History Society.

She served on many boards, including the Henry Clay Memorial Foundation which acquired Ashland, the estate of Henry Clay.

== Retired life and death ==
Hargreaves retired from the University of Kentucky in 1984 and was named professor emerita. She continued to work as a scholar and community activist, living with her husband in Lexington on Cassidy Avenue. During her retirement she produced a volume for the University Press of Kansas' American Presidency series: The Presidency of John Quincy Adams (Lawrence, Kansas, 1985). Her book Dry Farming in the Northern Great Plains: Years of Readjustment, 1920-1990 (Lawrence, Kansas, 1993) followed up on the topic of her first study and was awarded the Theodore Saloutos book prize by the Agricultural History Society. It is still widely regarded as a standard work on that topic.

She was an active member of the First United Methodist Church in Lexington and left a legacy for the Kentucky United Methodist Homes for Children and Youth. Her activism in organizations included animal rights. She especially loved her many golden retrievers. She and her husband enjoyed classical music as well as ballroom dancing at Arthur Murray studios. After a brief illness, Hargreaves died on August 29, 2008, in Lexington, Kentucky at age 94.

Besides the First United Methodist legacy, Hargreaves also upon her death endowed a general fund scholarship at the University of Nevada, Reno. A University of Kentucky Graduate School fellowship was named in her memory to provide financial support for graduate student travel, both for dissertation related research and for presentations at scholarly conferences.

== Books ==
- Hargreaves, Mary Wilma M. (1957). Dry farming in the northern Great Plains, 1900–1925. Harvard Economic Studies, Volume CI. Cambridge, MA: Harvard University Press.
- Clay, Henry (1959). Hopkins, James Franklin; Hargreaves, Mary Wilma Massey (eds.). The papers of Henry Clay: The rising statesman, 1797-1814. Vol. 1. Lexington, KY: University Press of Kentucky.
- Clay, Henry (1961). Hopkins, James Franklin; Hargreaves, Mary Wilma Massey (eds.). The papers of Henry Clay: The rising statesman, 1815-1820. Vol. 2. Lexington, KY: University Press of Kentucky.
- Clay, Henry (1963). Hopkins, James Franklin; Hargreaves, Mary Wilma Massey (eds.). The papers of Henry Clay: Presidential candidate, 1821-1824. Vol. 3. Lexington, KY: University Press of Kentucky.
- Clay, Henry (1972). Hopkins, James Franklin; Hargreaves, Mary Wilma Massey; Cutler, Wayne (eds.). The papers of Henry Clay: Secretary of State, 1825. Vol. 4. Lexington, KY: University Press of Kentucky.
- Clay, Henry (1973). Hopkins, James Franklin; Hargreaves, Mary Wilma Massey; Cutler, Wayne (eds.). The papers of Henry Clay: Secretary of State, 1826. Vol. 5. Lexington, KY: University Press of Kentucky.
- Clay, Henry (1981). Hopkins, James Franklin; Hargreaves, Mary Wilma Massey (eds.). The papers of Henry Clay: Secretary of State, 1827. Vol. 6. Lexington, KY: University Press of Kentucky.
- Hargreaves, Mary Wilma M. (1985). The presidency of John Quincy Adams. Lawrence, KS: University Press of Kansas. ISBN 9780700602728.
- Hargreaves, Mary Wilma M. (1993). Dry farming in the northern Great Plains: Years of readjustment, 1920-1990. Lawrence, KS: University Press of Kansas.

== Selected essays and articles ==
- Hargreaves, Mary W.M. (January 1958). "Hardy Webster Campbell (1850-1937)". Agricultural History. 32 (1): 62–65.
- Hargreaves, Mary W.M. (Summer 1968). "The Durum Wheat Controversy". Agricultural History. 42 (3): 211–229.
- Hargreaves, Mary W.M. (April 1973). "Homesteading and Homemaking on the Plains: A Review". Agricultural History. 47 (2): 156–163.
- Hargreaves, Mary W.M. (January 1976). "Women in the Agricultural Settlement of the Northern Plains: A Review". Agricultural History. 50 (3): 179–189.
- Hargreaves, Mary W.M. (Fall 1976). "Land-use Planning in Response to Drought: The Experience of the Thirties". Agricultural History. 50 (4): 561–582.
- Hargreaves, Mary W.M. (Winter 1977). "The Dry-Farming Movement in Retrospect". Agricultural History. 51 (1): 149–165.
- Hargreaves, Mary W.M. (1979). "Space: Its institutional impact in the development of the Great Plains". In Blouet, Brian W.; Luebke, Frederick C. (eds.). The Great Plains: Environment and culture. Lincoln: University of Nebraska Press. pp. 205–223.
- Hargreaves, Mary W.M. (1983). "A Dedication to the Memory of James Orin Oliphant, 1894-1979". Arizona and the West. 25 (4): 308–312.
