= Richard Lowitt =

American historian (1922–2018)

Richard Lowitt (February 25, 1922 – June 23, 2018) was an American historian. He was a professor of American History at Iowa State University, the University of Oklahoma, and the University of Science and Arts of Oklahoma, and he was the author of several books about the American West. He was president of the Agricultural History Society 1991–1992 and he was the first recipient of its Gladys L. Baker Award for lifetime achievement in 2010.

== Early life ==
Lowitt was born on February 25, 1922, in New York City. His parents, Eugene Lowitt and Eleanor Lebowitz, were Hungarian immigrants. He graduated from the City College of New York, where he earned a bachelor's degree in 1943. He went to graduate school at Columbia University, where he earned a master's degree in 1945 and a PhD in 1950.

== Career ==
Lowitt taught American History at Connecticut College, Florida State University, the University of Kentucky, the University of Maryland, and the University of Rhode Island. He joined Iowa State University, where he was the chair of the History department. He eventually became a professor of American History at the University of Oklahoma, and Regents Professor at the University of Science and Arts of Oklahoma.

Lowitt authored several books about the American West as well as biographies of George W. Norris and Bronson M. Cutting. He was awarded a Guggenheim Fellowship in 1957.

He was president of the Agricultural History Society 1991–1992, and in 2010, he became the first recipient of the that society's Gladys L. Baker Award for lifetime achievement.

== Personal life and death ==
Lowitt married Suzanne Carson. They had a son, Peter, and a daughter, Pamela. His wife predeceased him in 2006.

Lowitt died on June 23, 2018, in Concord, Massachusetts.

== Selected works ==
- Lowitt, Richard (1971). George W. Norris: The Persistence of a Progressive, 1913-1933. Urbana, Illinois: University of Illinois Press. ISBN 9780252001765. OCLC 219922.
- Lowitt, Richard (1992). Bronson M. Cutting: Progressive Politician. Albuquerque, New Mexico: University of New Mexico Press. ISBN 9780826313478. OCLC 25746887.
- Lowitt, Richard (2002). From Liberalism to Populism: A Political Biography of Fred Harris. Lanham, Maryland: Rowman & Littlefield. ISBN 9780742521629. OCLC 48752916.
- Sherer Mathes, Valerie; Lowitt, Richard (2003). The Standing Bear Controversy: Prelude to Indian Reform. Urbana, Illinois: University of Illinois Press. ISBN 9780252028526. OCLC 845549292.
- Lowitt, Richard (2006). American Outback: The Oklahoma Panhandle in the Twentieth Century. Lubbock, Texas: Texas Tech University Press. OCLC 607758289.
