= Agricultural History Society =

Society of historians of agriculture, founded 1919

- Formation: February 14, 1919; 107 years ago
- Founded at: Washington, D.C.
- President: Sara Egge (2026)
- Publication: Agricultural History
- Affiliations: American Historical Association (1920; 1975)
- Website: https://www.aghistorysociety.org

The Agricultural History Society (founded February 14, 1919) is an American professional society for the study of the history of agriculture and rural life. It was founded in Washington, D.C., in 1919 by a group closely associated with the United States Department of Agriculture, but it has moved several times since and it became more academic after moving its journal from D.C. to the American Midwest in the 1950s. The society affiliated with the American Historical Association (AHA) in 1920 to publish historical work before beginning a journal of its own, the quarterly Agricultural History, in 1927, which has stayed in print ever since. The society also organizes annual meetings and it awards prizes for books, articles, and dissertations in the field of agricultural history. It is led by its president and executive committee.

== Description ==
The Agricultural History Society is a professional society organized "to promote research and study in the field of agricultural history and rural life." It has organized annual meetings since 1919, a quarterly journal titled Agricultural History since 1927, and annual conferences since 2006. It is an affiliate society of the American Historical Association, and in January 2025 it was reported to have 387 members. It grants nine annual awards detailed below in the section Agricultural History Society § Awards.

The society is led by its five executive officers: a president, a vice president, an executive secretary, a treasurer, and an editor, as well as six other elected executive committee members. Presidents and vice presidents serve one-year terms and the vice president automatically succeeds the president; committee members serve three-year terms; the secretary, treasurer, and editor positions are appointed by the committee at its discretion. The first president was botanist Rodney H. True, and the president elected for 2026 was historian Sara Egge.

== History ==
The Agricultural History Society was founded in a February 14, 1919, meeting at the Cosmos Club in Washington, D.C. The meeting was convened by J. Franklin Jameson of the American Historical Association (AHA), and the chair of the meeting, Bureau of Plant Industry botanist Rodney H. True, became founding president of the new society. The society established regular annual meetings, and it incorporated in 1924. By February 1, 1928, the society had 200 members, which included 86 members in Washington, D.C. and 64 working for the United States Department of Agriculture (USDA). Historical records of the society for 1919–1982 are held at the United States National Agricultural Library.

In 1920, the society affiliated with the AHA to organize a session in its annual meetings and to publish through its annual report. However, this publication was delayed by years and was reduced from full papers to abstracts by 1927, motivating the society to begin publishing its own quarterly journal supported through annual membership fees, Agricultural History. The founding editor was USDA economist, statistician, and historian Oscar Clemen Stine, who was also secretary-treasurer of the society.

Stine recruited his successor as editor, Everett E. Edwards, from within the USDA Bureau of Agricultural Economics as assistant editor in 1928; Edwards became chief editor in 1931 then continued as lead editor of the journal from the USDA until he died in 1952. Stine remained secretary-treasurer through 1939. In these early days, the society struggled financially and fell into debt to cover journal printing costs, but it survived. During his long tenure Edwards defined the early style and focus of the journal.

Following Edwards's death, Agricultural History and one center of mass of the society moved to the Midwest, starting with University of Wisconsin–Madison in 1953, where Vernon Carstensen became chief editor, and then the University of Illinois in 1957. With the USDA affiliation now less central, though USDA officials remained secretary-treasurers of the organization through 1999, the society and journal became more academic. The fraction of authors of Agricultural History articles working in government decreased from 18% in the 1940s to 4% by the 1960s.

In 1965, the journal moved further west to the University of California, Davis, where it remained until 1994. In this period the journal was published by the University of California Press and the society used UC Davis's support to begin running annual 3–4 day summer symposia on specific topics in agricultural history, such as Southern United States, American West Coast, and Great Plains regional agriculture. The society became officially affiliated to the AHA again in 1975.

In 1994, the society's journal moved back to the Midwest at Iowa State University under R. Douglas Hurt until 2003 and then to the Great Plains at North Dakota State University under Claire Strom until 2008, when Strom took it to Rollins College in Florida. In 1999, the secretary-treasurer office passed from USDA economist Lowell K. Dyson to an academic, University of Arkansas at Little Rock history department chair C. Fred Williams. In 2010, the office was split into separate secretary and treasurer roles.

In the mid-2000s, the society's smaller annual symposia were discontinued in favor of larger annual meetings. The first was hosted by Deborah Kay Fitzgerald at the Massachusetts Institute of Technology in 2006, and they have been hosted in a series of cities since. The programs for each have been available on the society website.

During Strom's editorship, 2003–2016, the journal transitioned from the University of California Press to a society publishing model supported by Sheridan Press. Under the next chief editor, Albert G. Way (editor 2016–2024), the journal switched publishers again, to Duke University Press, in 2022.

== Awards ==
The society gives nine annual awards for books, articles, dissertations, teaching, public engagement, and lifetime achievement, and it honors some of its members as society fellows.

The society's two annual book awards are the Theodore Saloutos Memorial Award, "for the best book on agricultural history in the United States" in the prior year, and the Henry A. Wallace Award, "for the best book on any aspect (broadly interpreted) of agricultural history outside the United States" in the prior year. These are named for the historian Theodore Saloutos and the statesman Henry A. Wallace, and they have been awarded annually since 1982 and 2010, respectively. The society also awarded a now-defunct annual book award 1953–1970. (Potentially confusingly, the society's Saloutos Award shares a common name with a different annual book award given by the Immigration and Ethnic History Society; historian Jon Gjerde once won both Saloutos Awards for the same book, The Minds of the West (1997).)

The society's lifetime achievement award is the Gladys L. Baker Award, established in 2009 and first awarded in 2010, to Richard Lowitt. The award is named for USDA agricultural historian Gladys Baker (1910–1991), who was society president in 1970.

The society began to recognize certain members as honorary fellows in 1995, beginning with a group including Gilbert C. Fite, Robert W. Fogel, Paul W. Gates, Eugene D. Genovese, Mary W.M. Hargreaves, and Joan M. Jensen. The number of fellows is capped at one fifth of the society's regular membership.

== Sources ==
- Berry, Cody Lynn (March 20, 2025). "C. Fred Williams (1943–2013)". Encyclopedia of Arkansas.
- Effland, Anne (Fall 2008). "Lowell K. Dyson (1929–2008): A Memorial". Agricultural History. 82 (4): 519–523. doi:10.1215/00021482-82.4.519.
- Kellar, Herbert A. (January 1953). "Everett Eugene Edwards". Agricultural History. 27 (1): 2–18. JSTOR 3740593.
- Schmidt, Louis Bernard (Summer 1962). "A Dedication to the Memory of Everett E. Edwards: 1900-1952". Arizona and the West. 4 (2): 99–104. JSTOR 40167745.
- Stine, O. C. (January 1928). "Agricultural History Society". Agricultural History. 2 (1): 39–48. JSTOR 3739589.
- Strom, Claire (Winter 2019). "Idiosyncratic Reflections on Ninety Years of Agricultural History, Written in Celebration of the Agricultural History Society's One-Hundredth-Year Anniversary". Agricultural History. 93 (1): 139–172. doi:10.3098/ah.2019.093.1.139. JSTOR 10.3098/ah.2019.093.1.139.
