= Agricultural History (journal) =

- Discipline: History
- Language: English
- Edited by: Drew Swanson

Publication details
- History: 1927–present
- Publisher: Duke University Press (United States)
- Frequency: Quarterly

Standard abbreviations
- ISO 4: Agric. Hist.

Indexing
- ISSN: 1533-8290
- LCCN: 2001-214619
- JSTOR: 00021482
- OCLC no.: 45905785

Links
- Journal homepage

Agricultural History is a quarterly peer reviewed academic journal published for the American Agricultural History Society by Duke University Press. Established in 1927, the journal publishes articles related to the history of agricultural and rural life in all geographies and amongst all people. The journal includes research, book and film reviews, and special features. Claire Strom (Rollins College) served as editor from 2003 until the end of 2016. Albert Way (Kennesaw State University) succeeded Strom, and Drew Swanson (Georgia Southern University) is the current editor.

== Abstracting and indexing ==
The journal is abstracted and indexed in:

- L'Année philologique
- AGRICOLA
- Historical Abstracts
- Academic Search Premier
- Arts and Humanities Citation Index
- Science Citation Index Expanded
- Scopus
- Social Sciences Citation Index
- ERIH PLUS
- SCImago Journal Rank
