= History of agriculture =

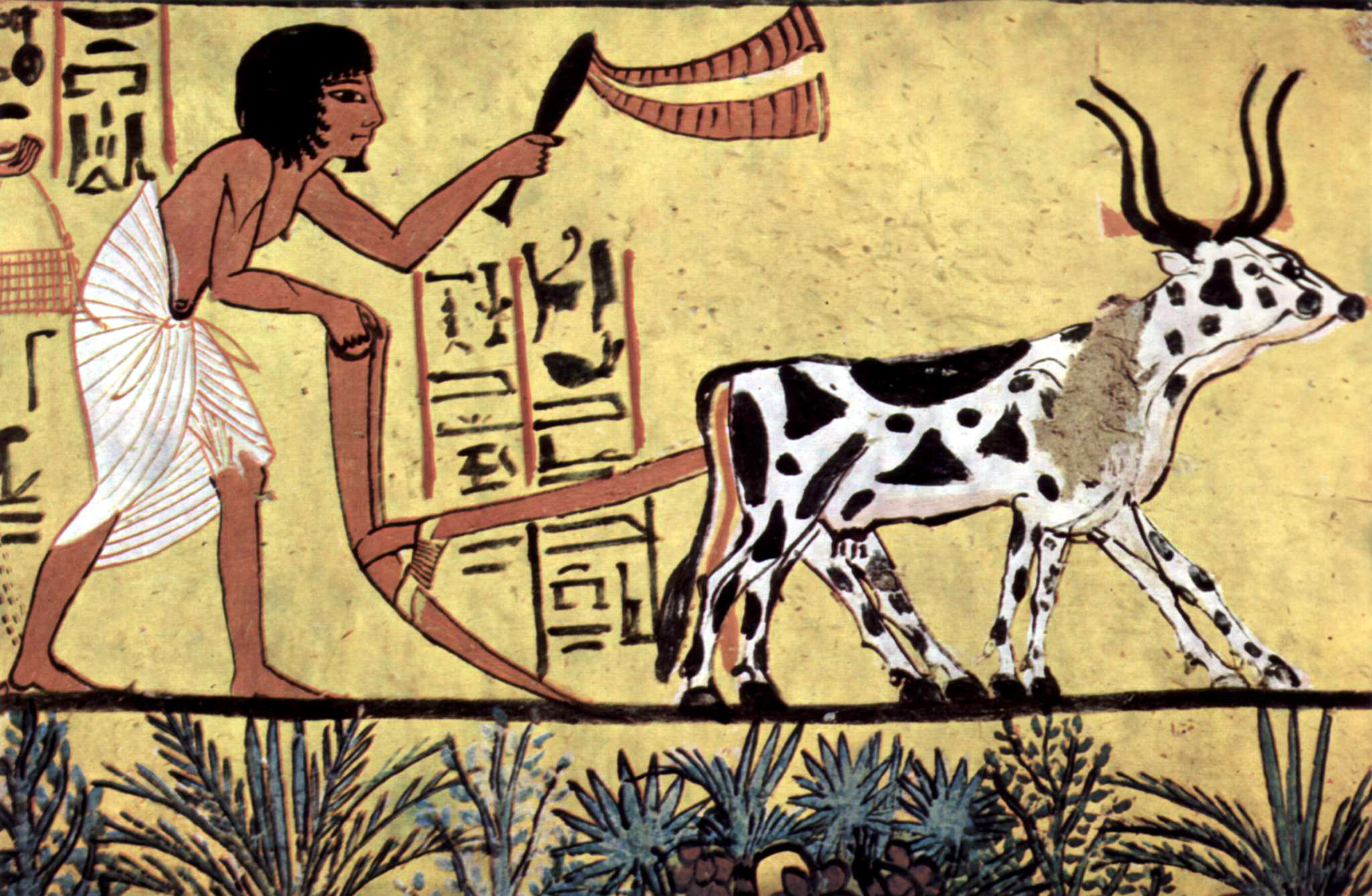
Ploughing with a yoke of horned cattle in Ancient Egypt. Painting from the burial chamber of Sennedjem, c. 1200 BC.

Agriculture began independently in different parts of the globe, and included a diverse range of taxa. At least eleven separate regions of the Old and New World were involved as independent centers of origin. The development of agriculture about 12,000 years ago changed the way humans lived. They switched from nomadic hunter-gatherer lifestyles to permanent settlements and farming.

Wild grains were collected and eaten from at least 104,000 years ago. However, domestication did not occur until much later. The earliest evidence of small-scale cultivation of edible grasses is from around 21,000 BC with the Ohalo II people on the shores of the Sea of Galilee. By around 9500 BC, the eight Neolithic founder crops – emmer wheat, einkorn wheat, hulled barley, peas, lentils, bitter vetch, chickpeas, and flax – were cultivated in the Levant. Rye may have been cultivated earlier, but this claim remains controversial. Regardless, rye's spread from Southwest Asia to the Atlantic was independent of the Neolithic founder crop package. Rice was domesticated in China by 6200 BC with the earliest known cultivation from 5700 BC, followed by mung, soy and azuki beans. Rice was also independently domesticated in West Africa and cultivated by 1000 BC. Pigs were domesticated in Mesopotamia around 11,000 years ago, followed by sheep. Cattle were domesticated from the wild aurochs in the areas of modern Turkey and India around 8500 BC. Camels were domesticated late, perhaps around 3000 BC.

In sub-Saharan Africa, sorghum was domesticated in the Sahel region of Africa by 3000 BC, along with pearl millet by 2000 BC. Yams were domesticated in several distinct locations, including West Africa (unknown date), and cowpeas by 2500 BC. Rice (African rice) was also independently domesticated in West Africa and cultivated by 1000 BC. Teff and likely finger millet were domesticated in Ethiopia by 3000 BC, along with noog, ensete, and coffee. Other plant foods domesticated in Africa include watermelon, okra, tamarind and black eyed peas, along with tree crops such as the kola nut and oil palm. Plantains were cultivated in Africa by 3000 BC and bananas by 1500 BC. The helmeted guineafowl was domesticated in West Africa. Sanga cattle were likely also domesticated in North-East Africa, around 7000 BC, and later crossbred with other species.

In South America, agriculture began as early as 9000 BC, starting with the cultivation of several species of plants that later became only minor crops. In the Andes of South America, the potato was domesticated between 8000 BC and 5000 BC, along with beans, squash, tomatoes, peanuts, coca, llamas, alpacas, and guinea pigs. Cassava was domesticated in the Amazon Basin no later than 7000 BC. Maize (Zea mays) found its way to South America from Mesoamerica, where wild teosinte was domesticated about 7000 BC and selectively bred to become domestic maize. Cotton was domesticated in Peru by 4200 BC; another species of cotton was domesticated in Mesoamerica and became by far the most important species of cotton in the textile industry in modern times. Evidence of agriculture in the Eastern United States dates to about 3000 BCE. Several plants were cultivated, later to be replaced by the Three Sisters cultivation of maize, squash, and beans.

Sugarcane and some root vegetables were domesticated in New Guinea around 7000 BC. Bananas were cultivated and hybridized in the same period in Papua New Guinea. In Australia, agriculture was invented at a currently unspecified period, with the oldest eel traps of Budj Bim dating to 6,600 BC and the deployment of several crops ranging from murnong to bananas.

The Bronze Age, from c. 3300 BC, witnessed the intensification of agriculture in civilizations such as Mesopotamian Sumer, ancient Egypt, ancient Sudan, the Indus Valley civilisation of the Indian subcontinent, ancient China, and ancient Greece. From 100 BC to 1600 AD, world population continued to grow along with land use, as evidenced by the rapid increase in methane emissions from cattle and the cultivation of rice. During the Iron Age and era of classical antiquity, the expansion of ancient Rome, both the Republic and then the Empire, throughout the ancient Mediterranean and Western Europe built upon existing systems of agriculture while also establishing the manorial system that became a bedrock of medieval agriculture. In the Middle Ages, both in Europe and in the Islamic world, agriculture was transformed with improved techniques and the diffusion of crop plants, including the introduction of sugar, rice, cotton and fruit trees such as the orange to Europe by way of Al-Andalus. After the voyages of Christopher Columbus in 1492, the Columbian exchange brought New World crops such as maize, potatoes, tomatoes, sweet potatoes, and manioc to Europe, and Old World crops such as wheat, barley, rice, and turnips, and livestock including horses, cattle, sheep, and goats to the Americas.

Irrigation, crop rotation, and fertilizers were introduced soon after the Neolithic Revolution and developed much further in the past 200 years, starting with the British Agricultural Revolution. Since 1900, agriculture in the developed nations, and to a lesser extent in the developing world, has seen large rises in productivity as human labour has been replaced by mechanization, and assisted by synthetic fertilizers, pesticides, and selective breeding. The Haber-Bosch process allowed the synthesis of ammonium nitrate fertilizer on an industrial scale, greatly increasing crop yields. Modern agriculture has raised social, political, and environmental issues including water pollution, biofuels, genetically modified organisms, tariffs and farm subsidies. In response, organic farming developed in the twentieth century as an alternative to the use of synthetic pesticides.

== Origins ==
=== Origin hypotheses ===
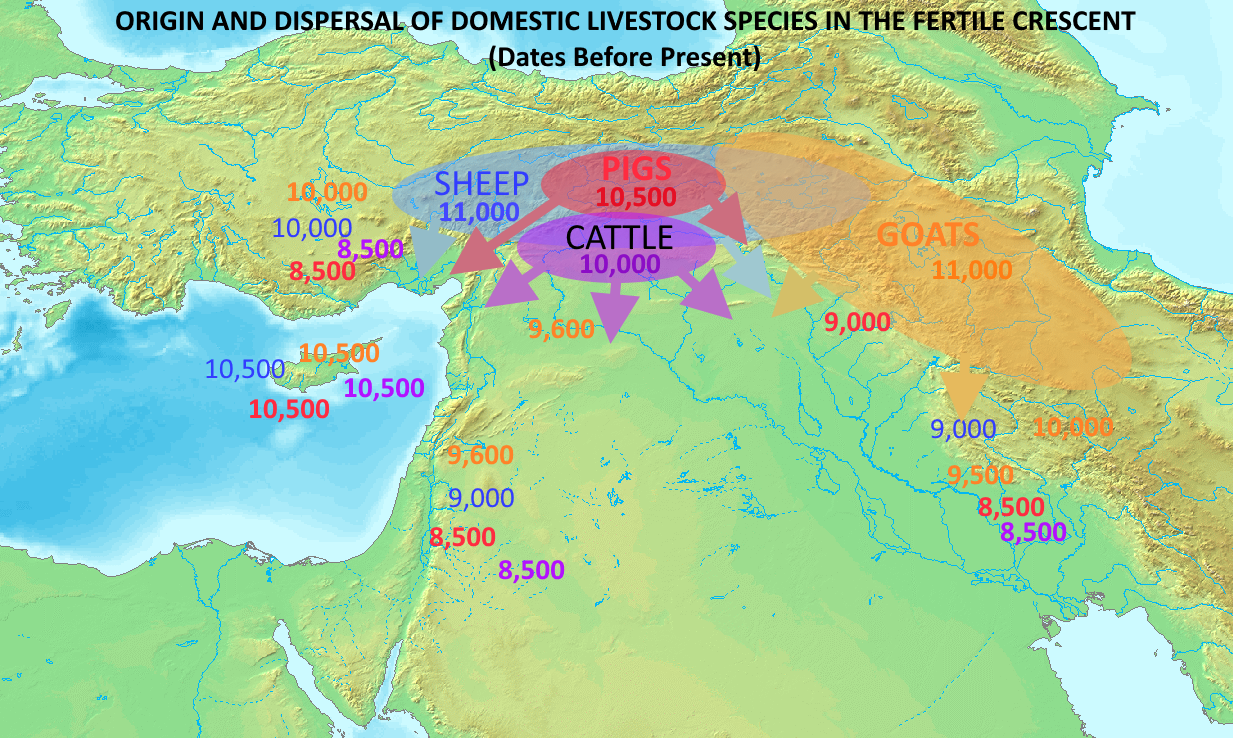
Origin and dispersal of domestic livestock species in the Fertile Crescent (dates Before Present).

Scholars have developed a number of hypotheses to explain the historical origins of agriculture. Studies of the transition from hunter-gatherer to agricultural societies indicate an antecedent period of intensification and increasing sedentism; examples are the Natufian culture in the Levant and the Early Chinese Neolithic in China. Current models indicate that wild stands that had been harvested previously started to be planted, but were not immediately domesticated.

Localised climate change is the favoured explanation for the origins of agriculture in the Levant. When major climate change took place after the last ice age (c. 11,000 BC), much of the earth became subject to long dry seasons. These conditions favoured annual plants which die off in the long dry season, leaving a dormant seed or tuber. An abundance of readily storable wild grains and pulses enabled hunter-gatherers in some areas to form the first settled villages at this time.

Across Western Eurasia it was not until approximately 4,000 BC that farming societies completely replaced hunter-gatherers. These technologically advanced societies expanded faster in areas with less forest, pushing hunter-gatherers into denser woodlands. Only the middle-late Bronze Age and Iron Age societies were able to fully replace hunter-gatherers in their final stronghold located in the most densely forested areas. Unlike their Bronze and Iron Age counterparts, Neolithic societies could not establish themselves in dense forests, and Copper Age societies had only limited success.

=== Early development ===
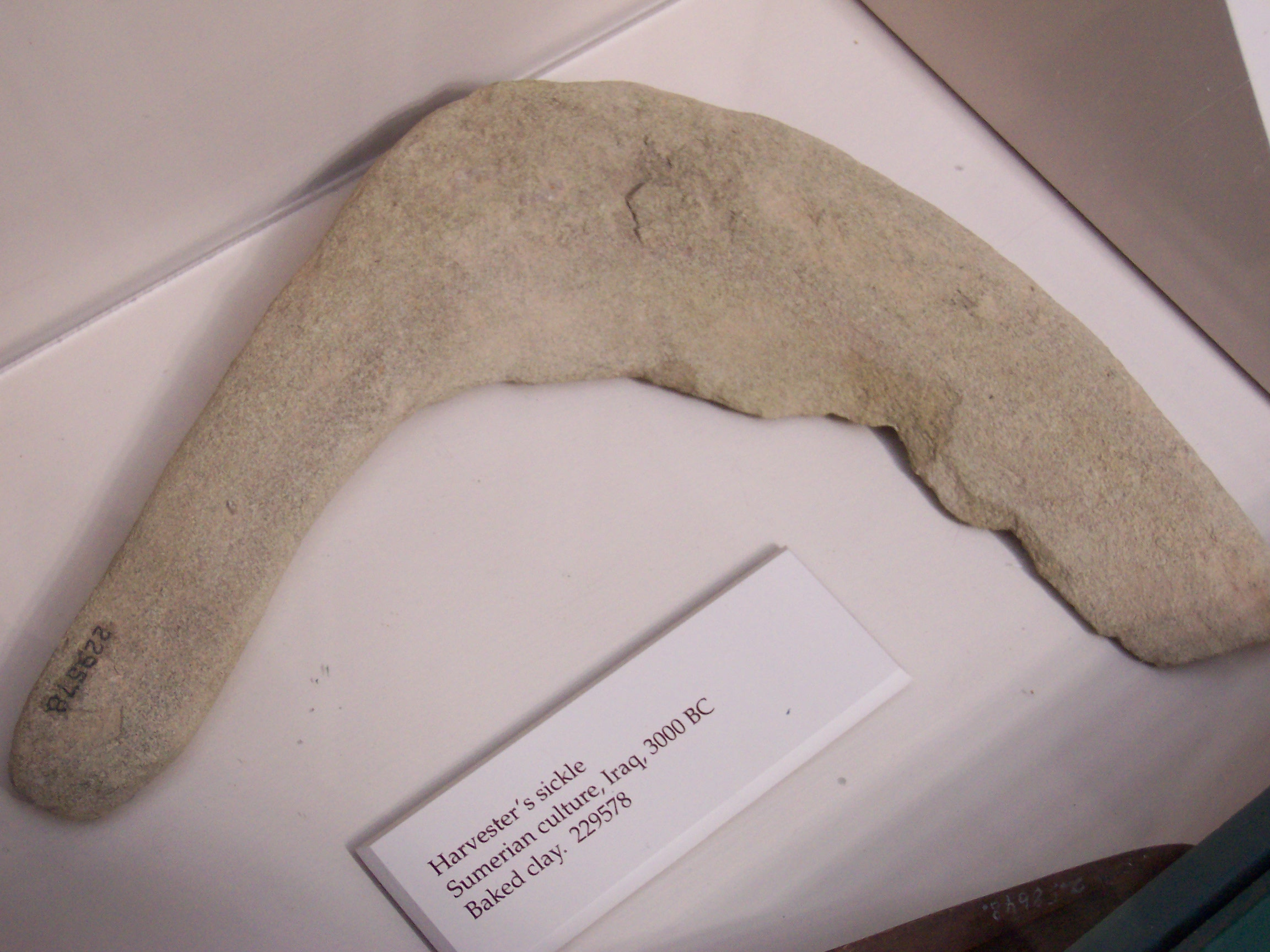
Sumerian harvester's sickle, 3000 BC, made from baked clay

Early people began altering communities of flora and fauna for their own benefit through means such as fire-stick farming and forest gardening very early. Wild grains have been collected and eaten from at least 105,000 years ago, and possibly much longer. Exact dates are hard to determine, as people collected and ate seeds before domesticating them, and plant characteristics may have changed during this period without human selection. An example is the semi-tough rachis and larger seeds of cereals from just after the Younger Dryas (about 9500 BC) in the early Holocene in the Levant region of the Fertile Crescent. Monophyletic characteristics were attained without any human intervention, implying that apparent domestication of the cereal rachis could have occurred quite naturally.

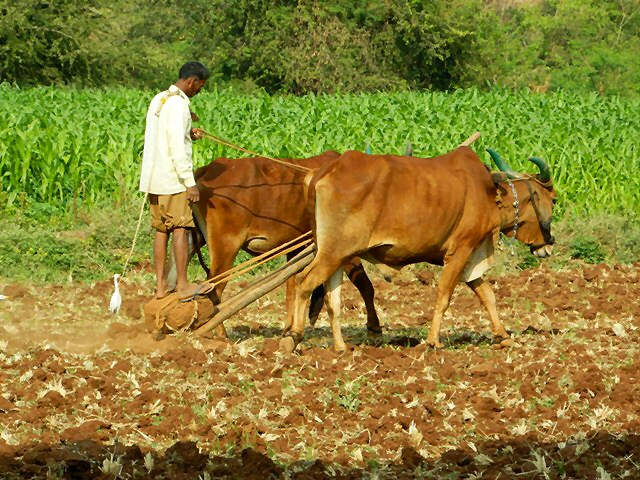
An Indian farmer with a rock-weighted scratch plough pulled by two oxen. Similar ploughs were used throughout antiquity.

Agriculture began independently in different parts of the globe and included a diverse range of taxa. At least 11 separate regions of the Old and New World were involved as independent centers of origin. Some of the earliest known domestications were of animals. Domestic pigs had multiple centres of origin in Eurasia, including Europe, East Asia and Southwest Asia, where wild boar were first domesticated about 10,500 years ago. Sheep were domesticated in Mesopotamia between 11,000 BC and 9000 BC. Cattle were domesticated from the wild aurochs in the areas of modern Turkey and India around 8500 BC. Camels were domesticated relatively late, perhaps around 3000 BC.

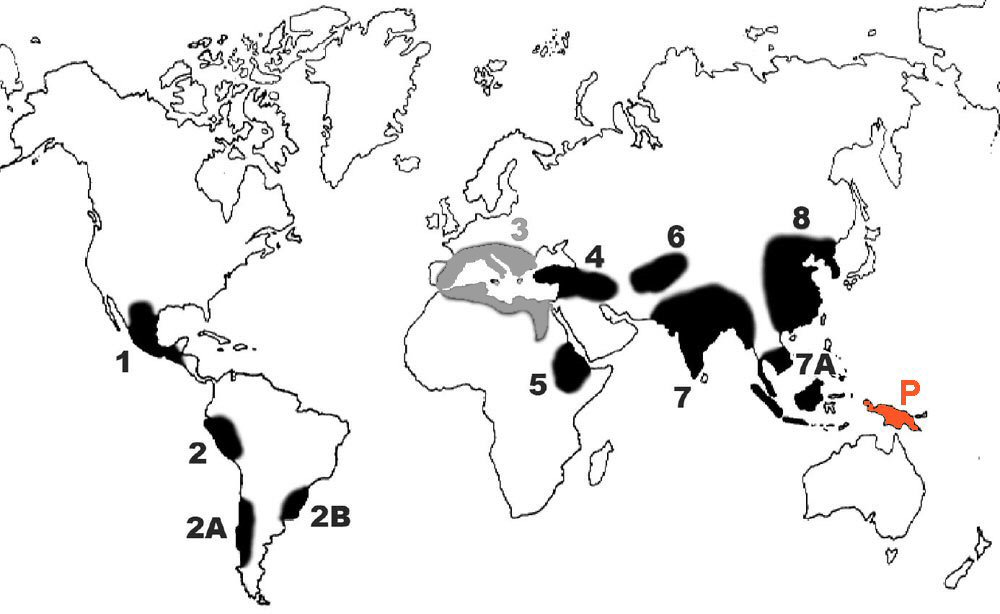
Centres of origin identified by Nikolai Vavilov in the 1930s. Area 3 (grey) is no longer recognised as a centre of origin, and Papua New Guinea (red, 'P') was identified more recently.

It was not until after 9500 BC that the eight so-called founder crops of agriculture appeared: first emmer and einkorn wheat, then hulled barley, peas, lentils, bitter vetch, chick peas and flax. These eight crops occur more or less simultaneously on Pre-Pottery Neolithic B (PPNB) sites in the Levant, although wheat may have been the first to be grown and harvested on a significant scale. At around the same time (9400 BC), parthenocarpic fig trees were domesticated.

Domesticated rye occurs in small quantities at some Neolithic sites in (Asia Minor) Turkey, such as the Pre-Pottery Neolithic B (c. 7600 – c. 6000 BC) Can Hasan III near Çatalhöyük, but is otherwise absent until the Bronze Age of central Europe, c. 1800–1500 BC. Claims of much earlier cultivation of rye, at the Epipalaeolithic site of Tell Abu Hureyra in the Euphrates valley of northern Syria, remain controversial. Critics point to inconsistencies in the radiocarbon dates, and identifications based solely on grain, rather than on chaff.

By 8000 BC, farming was entrenched on the banks of the Nile. About this time, agriculture was developed independently in the Far East, probably in China, with rice rather than wheat as the primary crop. Maize was domesticated from the wild grass teosinte in southern Mexico by 6700 BC. The potato (8000 BC), tomato, pepper, squash, and some varieties of bean were domesticated in the New World.

Agriculture was independently developed on the island of New Guinea. Banana cultivation of Musa acuminata, including hybridization, dates back to 5000 BC, and possibly to 8000 BC, in Papua New Guinea.

Bees were kept for honey in the Middle East around 7000 BC. Archaeological evidence from various sites on the Iberian peninsula suggests the domestication of plants and animals between 6000 and 4500 BC. Ireland's Céide Fields consist of tracts of land enclosed by stone walls built around 3500 BC, representing Europe's oldest field systems. The horse was domesticated in the Pontic steppe around 4000 BC In Siberia. Cannabis was in use in China in Neolithic times and may have been domesticated there; it was in use both as a fibre for ropemaking and as a medicine in Ancient Egypt by about 2350 BC.

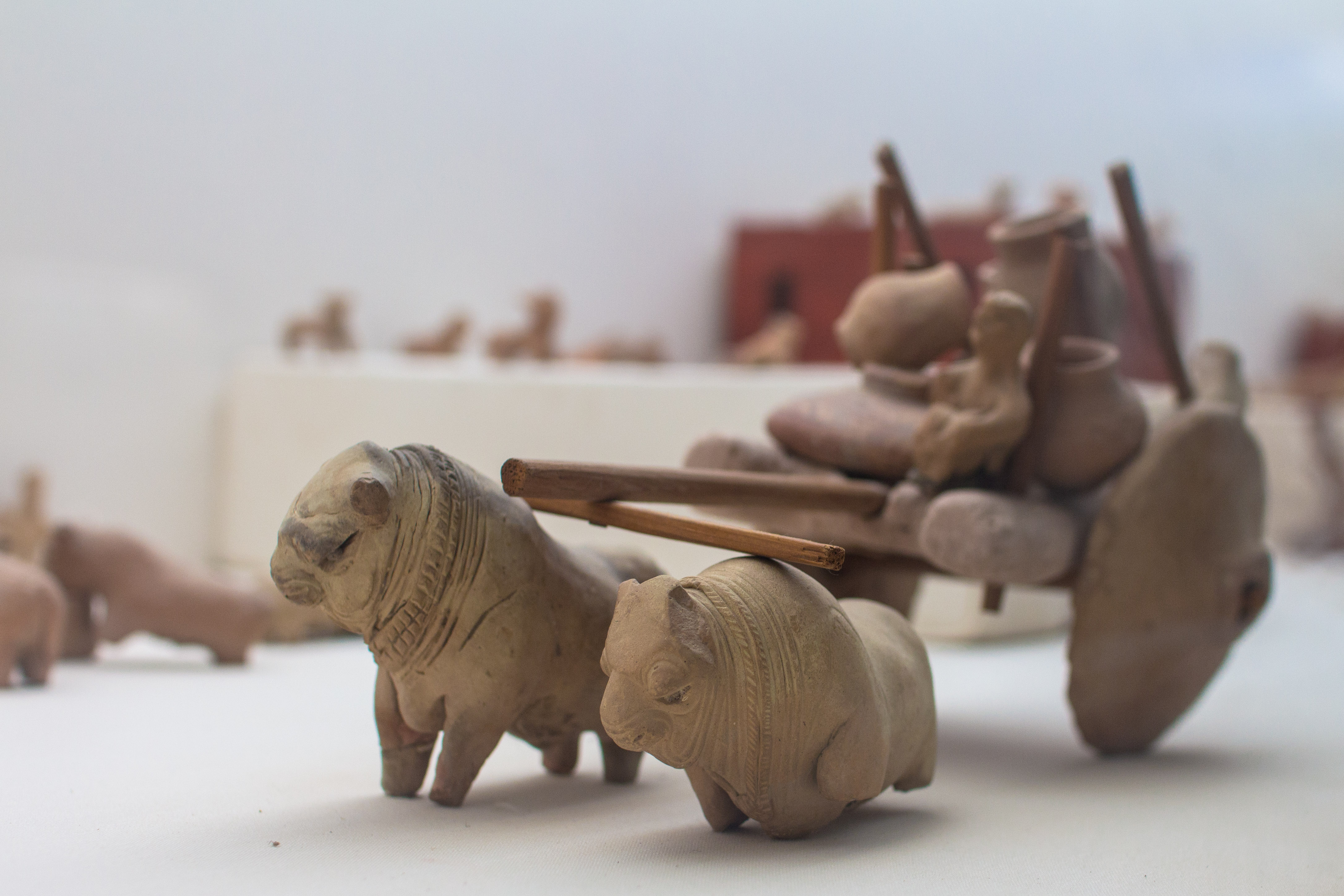
Clay and wood model of a bull cart carrying farm produce in large pots, Mohenjo-daro. The site was abandoned in the 19th century BC.

In northern China, millet was domesticated by early Sino-Tibetan speakers at around 8000 to 6000 BC, becoming the main crop of the Yellow River basin by 5500 BC.

Chronological dispersal of Austronesian peoples across the Indo-Pacific

In southern China, rice was domesticated in the Yangtze River basin at around 11,500 to 6200 BC, along with the development of wetland agriculture, by early Austronesian and Hmong-Mien-speakers. Other food plants were also harvested, including acorns, water chestnuts, and foxnuts. Rice cultivation was later spread to Maritime Southeast Asia by the Austronesian expansion, starting at around 3,500 to 2,000 BC. This migration event also saw the introduction of cultivated and domesticated food plants from Taiwan, Maritime Southeast Asia, and New Guinea into the Pacific Islands as canoe plants. Contact with Sri Lanka and Southern India by Austronesian sailors also led to an exchange of food plants which later became the origin of the valuable spice trade. In the 1st millennium AD, Austronesian sailors also settled Madagascar and the Comoros, bringing Southeast Asian and South Asian food plants with them to the East African coast, including bananas and rice. Rice was also spread southwards into Mainland Southeast Asia by around 2000 to 1500 BC by the migrations of the early Austroasiatic and Kra-Dai-speakers.

In the Sahel region of Africa, sorghum was domesticated by 3000 BC in Sudan and pearl millet by 2500 BC in Mali. Kola nut and coffee were also domesticated in Africa. In New Guinea, ancient Papuan peoples began practicing agriculture around 7000 BC, domesticating sugarcane and taro. In the Indus Valley from the eighth millennium BC onwards at Mehrgarh, 2-row and 6-row barley were cultivated, along with einkorn, emmer, and durum wheats, and dates. In the earliest levels of Merhgarh, wild game such as gazelle, swamp deer, blackbuck, chital, wild ass, wild goat, wild sheep, boar, and nilgai were all hunted for food. These are successively replaced by domesticated sheep, goats, and humped zebu cattle by the fifth millennium BC, indicating the gradual transition from hunting and gathering to agriculture.

Maize and squash were domesticated in Mesoamerica; potatoes in South America, and sunflowers in the Eastern Woodlands of North America.

== Civilizations ==
=== Sumer ===
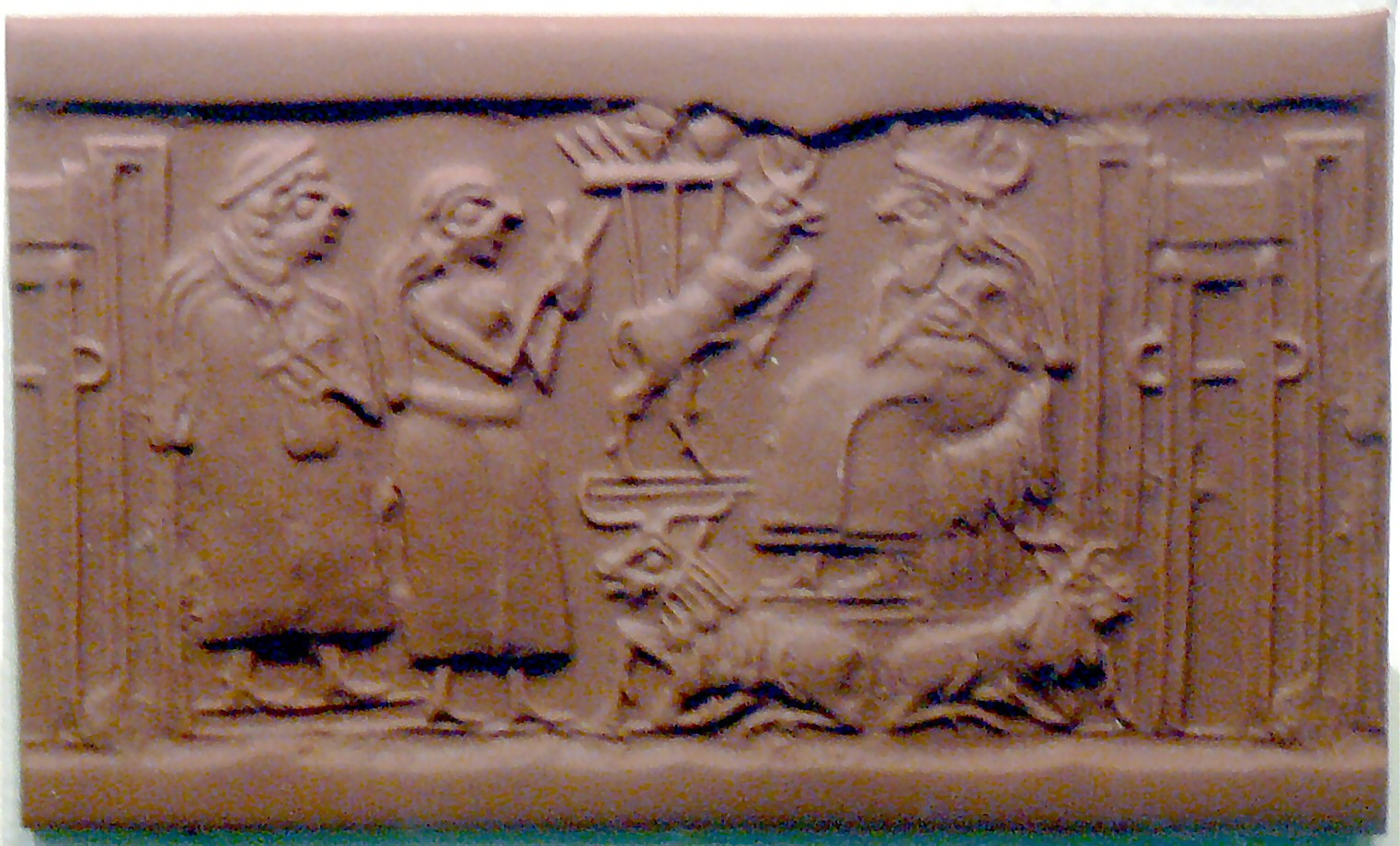
Domesticated animals on a Sumerian cylinder seal, 2500 BC

Sumerian farmers grew the cereals barley and wheat, starting to live in villages from about 8000 BC. Given the low rainfall of the region, agriculture relied on the Tigris and Euphrates rivers. Irrigation canals leading from the rivers permitted the growth of cereals in large enough quantities to support cities. The first ploughs appear in pictographs from Uruk around 3000 BC; seed-ploughs that funneled seed into the ploughed furrow appear on seals around 2300 BC. Vegetable crops included chickpeas, lentils, peas, beans, onions, garlic, lettuce, leeks and mustard. They grew fruits including dates, grapes, apples, melons, and figs. Alongside their farming, Sumerians also caught fish and hunted fowl and gazelle. The meat of sheep, goats, cows and poultry was eaten, mainly by the elite. Fish was preserved by drying, salting and smoking.

=== Ancient Egypt ===
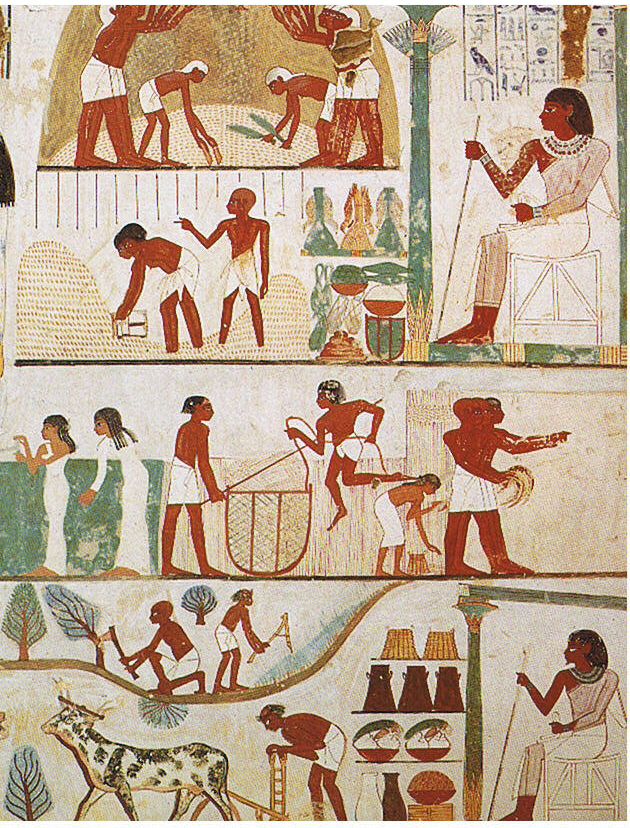
Agricultural scenes of threshing, a grain store, harvesting with sickles, digging, tree-cutting and ploughing from Ancient Egypt. Tomb of Nakht, 15th century BC.

The civilization of Ancient Egypt was indebted to the Nile River and its dependable seasonal flooding. The river's predictability and the fertile soil allowed the Egyptians to build an empire on the basis of great agricultural wealth. Egyptians were among the first peoples to practice agriculture on a large scale, starting in the pre-dynastic period from the end of the Paleolithic into the Neolithic, between around 10,000 BC and 4000 BC. This was made possible with the development of basin irrigation. Their staple food crops were grains such as wheat and barley, alongside industrial crops such as flax and papyrus. Archaeological evidence also suggests that the spread of agriculture in Egypt was facilitated by farming communities associated with the playa lakes of the Sahara some 6,500 years ago.

=== Indian Subcontinent ===
Jujube was domesticated in the Indian subcontinent by 9000 BC. Barley and wheat cultivation – along with the domestication of cattle, primarily sheep and goats – followed in Mehrgarh culture by 8000–6000 BC. This period also saw the first domestication of the elephant. Pastoral farming in India included threshing, planting crops in rows – either of two or of six – and storing grain in granaries. Cotton was cultivated by the 5th–4th millennium BC. By the 5th millennium BC, agricultural communities became widespread in Kashmir. Irrigation was developed in the Indus Valley Civilisation by around 4500 BC. The size and prosperity of the Indus civilization grew as a result of this innovation, leading to more thoroughly planned settlements which used drainage and sewers. Archeological evidence of an animal-drawn plough dates back to 2500 BC in the Indus Valley Civilization.

=== Ancient China ===
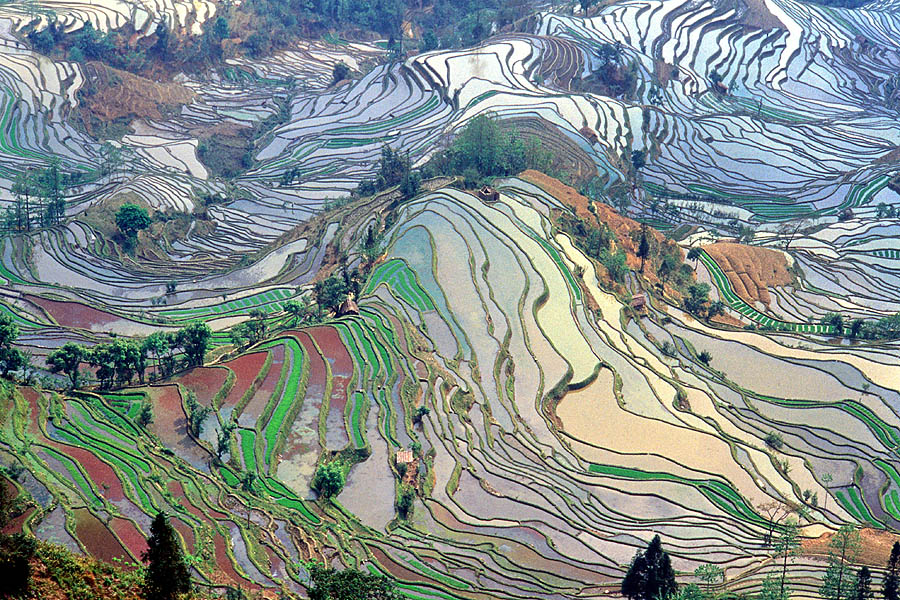
Ancient rice terraces in Yuanyang County, Yunnan

Records from the Warring States, Qin dynasty, and Han dynasty provide a picture of early Chinese agriculture from the 5th century BC to 2nd century AD which included a nationwide granary system and widespread use of sericulture. An important early Chinese book on agriculture is the Qimin Yaoshu of AD 535, written by Jia Sixie. Jia's writing style was straightforward and lucid relative to the elaborate and allusive writing typical of the time. Jia's book was also very long, with over one hundred thousand written Chinese characters, and it quoted many other Chinese books that were written previously, but no longer survive. The contents of Jia's 6th-century book include sections on land preparation, seeding, cultivation, orchard management, forestry, and animal husbandry. The book also includes peripherally related content covering trade and culinary uses for crops. The work and the style in which it was written proved influential on later Chinese agronomists, such as Wang Zhen and his groundbreaking Nong Shu of 1313.

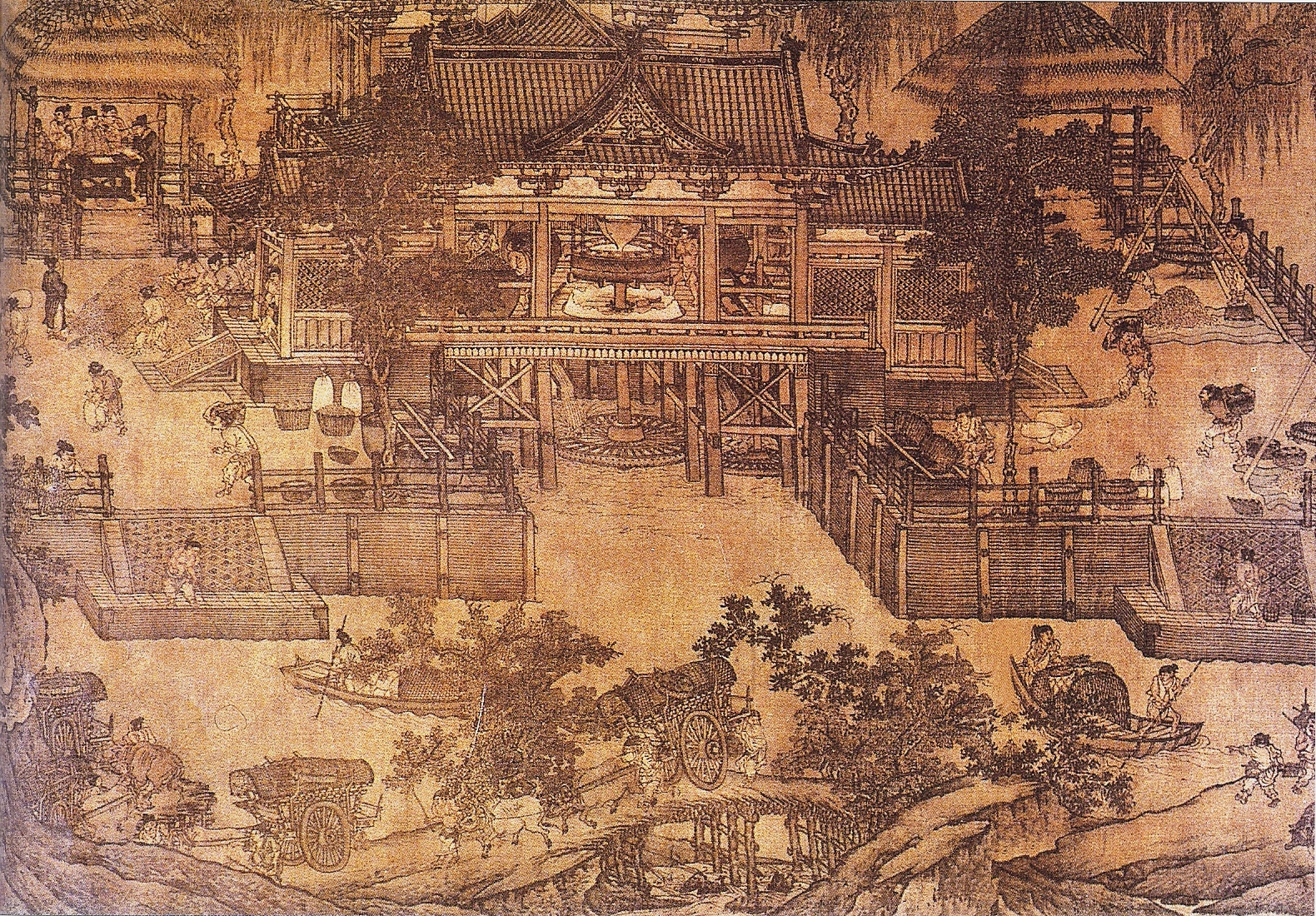
A Northern Song era (960–1127 AD) Chinese watermill for dehusking grain with a horizontal waterwheel

For agricultural purposes, the Chinese had innovated the hydraulic-powered trip hammer by the 1st century BC. Although it found other purposes, its main function was to pound, decorticate, and polish grain that otherwise would have been done manually. The Chinese also began using the square-pallet chain pump by the 1st century AD, powered by a waterwheel or oxen pulling on a system of mechanical wheels. Although the chain pump found use in public works of providing water for urban and palatial pipe systems, it was used largely to lift water from a lower to higher elevation in filling irrigation canals and channels for farmland. By the end of the Han dynasty in the late 2nd century, heavy ploughs had been developed with iron ploughshares and mouldboards. These slowly spread west, revolutionizing farming in Northern Europe by the 10th century. (Thomas Glick, however, argues for a development of the Chinese plough as late as the 9th century, implying its spread east from similar designs known in Italy by the 7th century.)

Asian rice was domesticated 13,500 to 8,200 years ago in China, with a single genetic origin from the wild rice Oryza rufipogon, in the Pearl River valley region of China. Rice cultivation then spread to South and Southeast Asia.

=== Ancient Greece and Hellenistic world ===
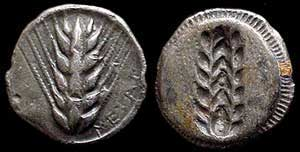
An ear of barley, symbol of wealth in the city of Metapontum in Magna Graecia (i.e. the Greek colonies of southern Italy), stamped stater, c. 530–510 BC

The major cereal crops of the ancient Mediterranean region were wheat, emmer, and barley, while common vegetables included peas, beans, fava, and olives. Dairy products came mostly from sheep and goats, and meat, which was consumed on rare occasion for most people, usually consisted of pork, beef, and lamb. Agriculture in ancient Greece was hindered by the topography of mainland Greece that only allowed for roughly 10% of the land to be cultivated properly, necessitating the specialised exportation of oil and wine and importation of grains from Thrace (centered in what is now Bulgaria) and the Greek colonies of Pontic Greeks near the Black Sea. During the Hellenistic period, the Ptolemaic Empire controlled Egypt, Cyprus, Phoenicia, and Cyrenaica, major grain-producing regions that mainland Greeks depended on for subsistence, while the Ptolemaic grain market also played a critical role in the rise of the Roman Republic. In the Seleucid Empire, Mesopotamia was a crucial area for the production of wheat, while nomadic animal husbandry was also practiced in other parts.

=== Roman Empire ===
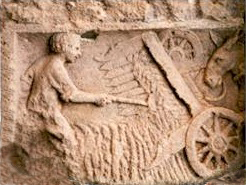
Roman harvesting machine, a vallus, from a Roman wall in Belgium, which was then part of the province of Gallia Belgica

In the Greco-Roman world of Classical antiquity, Roman agriculture was built on techniques originally pioneered by the Sumerians, transmitted to them by subsequent cultures, with a specific emphasis on the cultivation of crops for trade and export. The Romans laid the groundwork for the manorial economic system, involving serfdom, which flourished in the Middle Ages. The farm sizes in Rome can be divided into three categories. Small farms were from 18 to 88 iugera (one iugerum is equal to about 0.65 acre). Medium-sized farms were from 80 to 500 iugera (singular iugerum). Large estates (called latifundia) were over 500 iugera. The Romans had four systems of farm management: direct work by the owner and his family; slaves doing work under the supervision of slave managers; tenant farming or sharecropping in which the owner and a tenant divide up a farm's produce; and situations in which a farm was leased to a tenant.

=== The Americas ===
Agricultural history took a different path from the Old World as the Americas lacked large-seeded, easily domesticated grains (such as wheat and barley) and large domestic animals that could be used for agricultural labor. Rather than the practice which developed in the Old World of sowing a field with a single crop, pre-historic American agriculture usually consisted of cultivating many crops close to each other utilizing only hand labor. Moreover, agricultural areas in the Americas lacked the uniformity of the east–west area of Mediterranean and semi-arid climates in southern Europe and southwestern Asia, but instead had a north–south pattern with a variety of different climatic zones in close proximity to each other. This fostered the domestication of many different plants.

At the time of first contact between the Europeans and the Americans, the Europeans practiced "extensive agriculture, based on the plough and draught animals," with tenants under landlords, but also forced labor or slavery, while the Indigenous peoples of the Americas practiced "intensive agriculture, based on human labour." Europeans wanted control of land for the grazing of their livestock and property rights for the control of production. Though they were impressed with the productivity of traditional farming techniques, they saw no connection to their system and were dismissive of Native American practices as "gardening" rather than a commercializable enterprise. Due to several thousand years of selective breeding, maize, the hemisphere's most important crop, was more productive than Old World grain crops. Maize produced two and one-half times more calories per acre than wheat and barley.

==== South America ====
Agricultural terraces were (and are) common in the austere, high-elevation environment of the Andes.

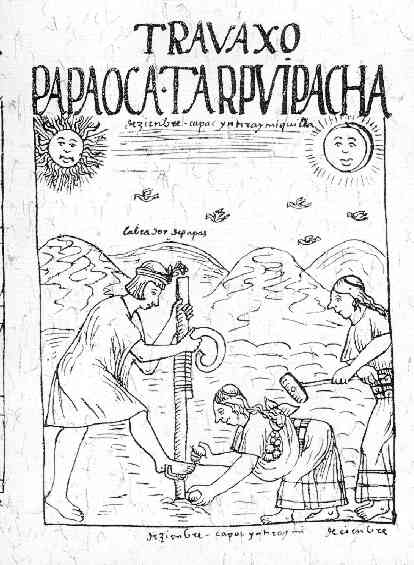
Inca farmers using a human-powered foot plough

The earliest known areas of possible agriculture in the Americas dating to about 9000 BC are in Colombia, near present-day Pereira, and by the Las Vegas culture in Ecuador on the Santa Elena peninsula. The plants cultivated (or manipulated by humans) were lerén (Calathea allouia), arrowroot (Maranta arundinacea), squash (Cucurbita species), and bottle gourd (Lagenaria siceraria). All are plants of humid climates and their existence at this time on the semi-arid Santa Elena peninsula may be evidence that they were transplanted there from more humid environments. In another study, this area of South America was identified as one of the four oldest places of origin for agriculture, along with the Fertile Crescent, China, and Mesoamerica, dated between 6200 BC and 10000 BC. (To facilitate comprehension by readers, Radiocarbon calibrated BP dates in the above sources have been converted to BC.)

In the Andes region, with civilizations including the Inca, the major crop was the potato, domesticated between 8000 and 5000 BC. Coca, still a major crop to this day, was domesticated in the Andes, as were the peanut, tomato, tobacco, and pineapple. Cotton was domesticated in Peru by 4200 BC. Animals were also domesticated, including llamas, alpacas, and guinea pigs. The people of the Inca Empire of South America grew large surpluses of food which they stored in buildings called Qullqas.

The most important crop domesticated in the Amazon Basin and tropical lowlands was probably cassava (Manihot esculenta), which was domesticated before 7000 BCE, likely in the Rondônia and Mato Grosso states of Brazil. The Guaitecas Archipelago in modern Chile was the southern limit of Pre-Hispanic agriculture near 44° South latitude, as noted by the mention of the cultivation of Chiloé potatoes by a Spanish expedition in 1557.

==== Mesoamerica ====
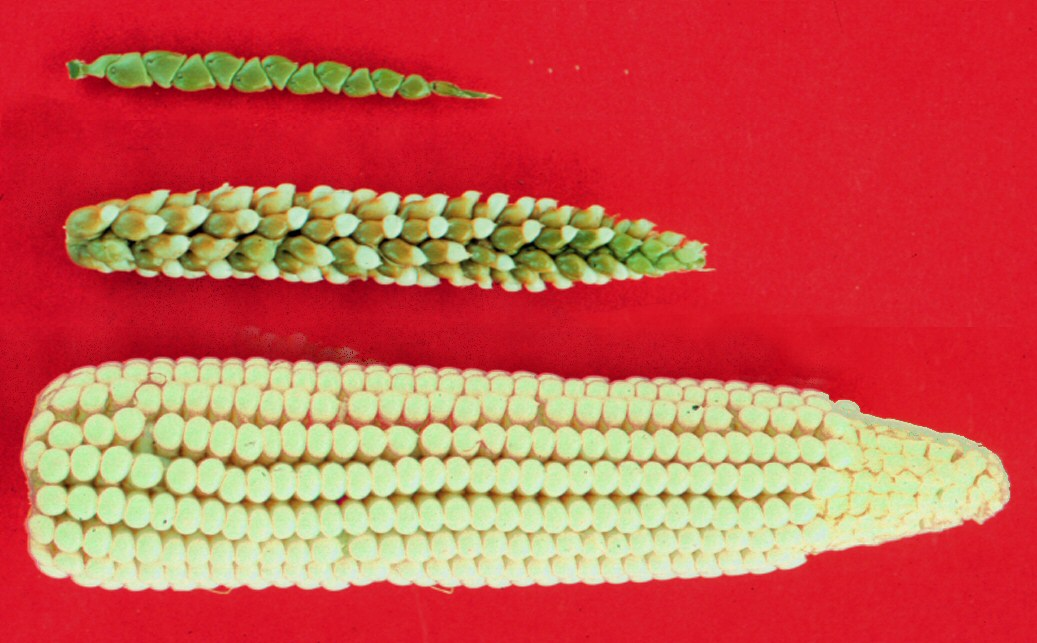
The creation of maize from teosinte (top), maize-teosinte hybrid (middle), to maize (bottom)

In Mesoamerica, wild teosinte was transformed through human selection into the ancestor of modern maize, about 7,000 BC. It gradually spread across North America and to South America and was the most important crop of Native Americans at the time of European exploration. Other Mesoamerican crops include hundreds of varieties of locally domesticated squash and beans, while cocoa, also domesticated in the region, was a major crop. The turkey, one of the most important poultry birds, was probably domesticated in Mexico or the U.S. Southwest.

In Mesoamerica, the Aztecs were active farmers and had an agriculturally focused economy. The land around Lake Texcoco was fertile, but not large enough to produce the amount of food needed for the population of their expanding empire. The Aztecs developed irrigation systems, formed terraced hillsides, fertilized their soil, and developed chinampas or artificial islands, also known as "floating gardens". The Mayas between 400 BC and 900 AD used extensive canal and raised field systems to farm swampland on the Yucatán Peninsula.

==== North America ====
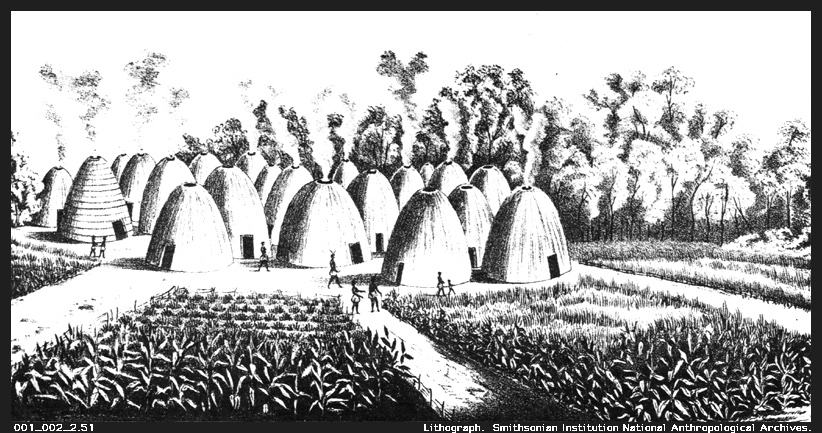
Wichita village of grass houses surrounded by maize fields in the United States

The indigenous people of the Eastern U.S. domesticated numerous crops, sunflowers, tobacco, varieties of squash and Chenopodium, as well as crops no longer grown, including marsh elder and little barley. Wild foods including wild rice and maple sugar were harvested. The domesticated strawberry is a hybrid of a Chilean and a North American species, developed by breeding in Europe and North America. Two major crops, pecans and Concord grapes, were used extensively in prehistoric times but do not appear to have been domesticated until the 19th century.

The indigenous people in what is now California and the Pacific Northwest practiced various forms of forest gardening and fire-stick farming in the forests, grasslands, mixed woodlands, and wetlands, ensuring that desired food and medicine plants continued to be available. The natives controlled fire on a regional scale to create low-intensity fire ecology which prevented larger, catastrophic fires and sustained a low-density agriculture in loose rotation; a sort of "wild" permaculture.

A system of companion planting called the Three Sisters was developed in North America. Three crops that complemented each other were planted together: winter squash, maize (corn), and climbing beans (typically tepary beans or common beans). The maize provides a structure for the beans to climb, eliminating the need for poles. The beans provide the nitrogen to the soil that the other plants use, and the squash spreads along the ground, blocking the sunlight, helping prevent the establishment of weeds. The squash leaves also act as a "living mulch".

=== Sub-Saharan Africa ===
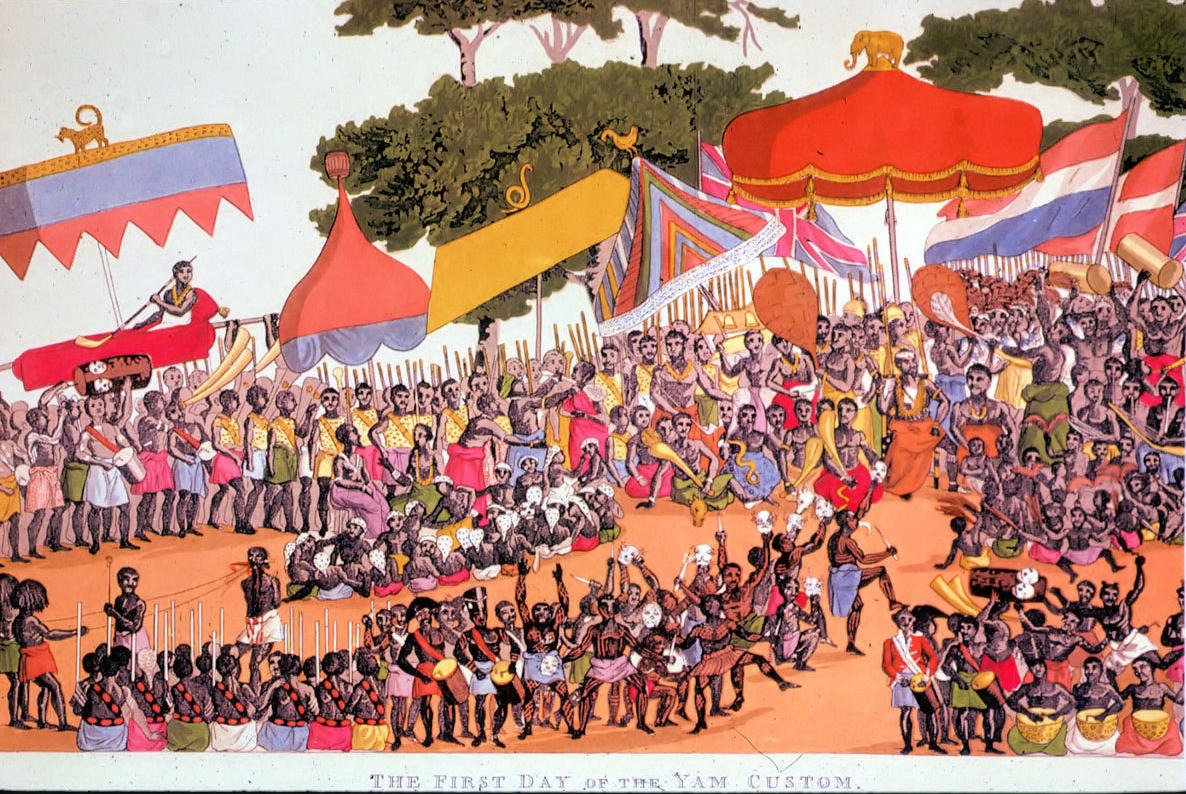
Yam festival in the Ashanti Empire. Thomas E. Bowdich – 1817

In the Sahel region, civilizations such as the Mali and Songhai empires cultivated sorghum and pearl millet, which were domesticated between 3000 and 2500 BC. The donkey was domesticated in Nubia at approximately 5000 BC. Archaeological evidence suggests that Sanga cattle may have been independently domesticated in East Africa at around 1600 BC.

In the tropical region of West Africa, crops such as black-eyed peas, Sea Island red peas, yams, kola nuts, Jollof rice and kokoro were domesticated between 3000 and 1000 BC. The coastal region of West Africa is often referred to as the "Yam Belt", due to its high production of yams. The guineafowl is a poultry bird that was domesticated in West Africa, and while the time of the guineafowl's domestication remains unclear, there is evidence that it was present in Ancient Greece during the 5th century BC.

Several species of coffee were also domesticated throughout Sub-Saharan Africa, with Coffea arabica originating in Ethiopia and serving as the main source of modern-day coffee since the late 15th century.

=== Oceania ===
==== Australia ====
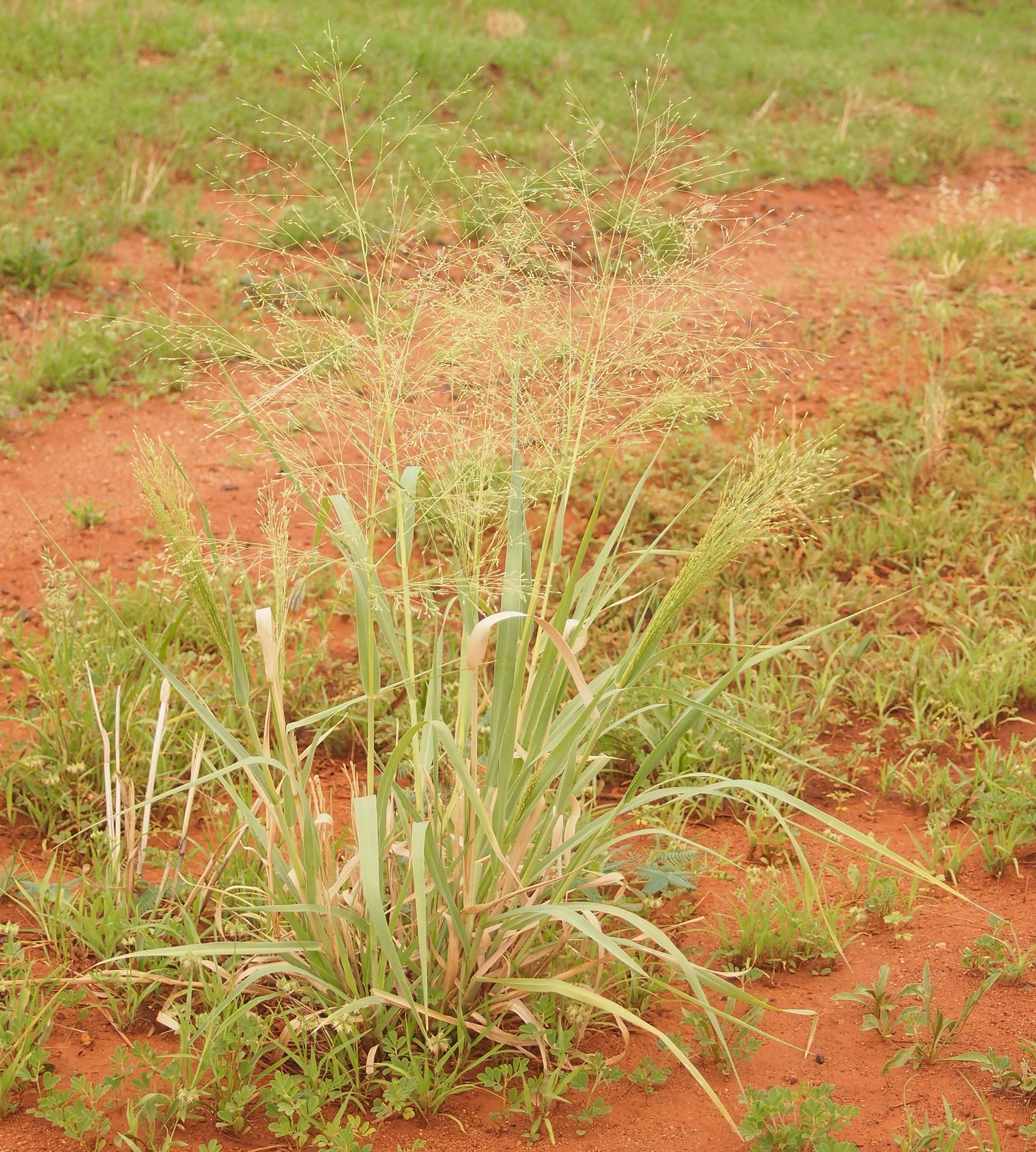
Native millet, Panicum decompositum, was planted and harvested by Indigenous Australians in eastern central Australia.

Indigenous Australians were predominately nomadic hunter-gatherers. Due to the policy of terra nullius, Aboriginals were regarded as not having been capable of sustained agriculture. However, the current consensus is that various agricultural methods were employed by the indigenous people.

In two regions of Central Australia, the central west coast and eastern central Australia, forms of agriculture were practiced. People living in permanent settlements of over 200 residents sowed or planted on a large scale and stored the harvested food. The Nhanda and Amangu of the central west coast grew yams (Dioscorea hastifolia), while various groups in eastern central Australia (the Corners Region) planted and harvested bush onions (yaua – Cyperus bulbosus), native millet (cooly, tindil – Panicum decompositum) and a sporocarp, ngardu (Marsilea drummondii).

Indigenous Australians used systematic burning, fire-stick farming, to enhance natural productivity. In the 1970s and 1980s archaeological research in south west Victoria established that the Gunditjmara and other groups had developed sophisticated eel farming and fish trapping systems over a period of nearly 5,000 years. The archaeologist Harry Lourandos suggested in the 1980s that there was evidence of 'intensification' in progress across Australia, a process that appeared to have continued through the preceding 5,000 years. These concepts led the historian Bill Gammage to argue that in effect the whole continent was a managed landscape.

Torres Strait Islanders are now known to have planted bananas.

==== Pacific Islands ====
In New Guinea, archaeological evidence suggests that agriculture independently emerged around 7,000 years ago with the domestication of crops such as bananas and taro. Pigs and chickens were imported to New Guinea, which were later innovated by other Pacific Island nations, such as those in Polynesia.

== Middle Ages and Early Modern period ==
=== Europe ===
The Middle Ages saw further improvements in agriculture. Monasteries spread throughout Europe and became important centers for the collection of knowledge related to agriculture and forestry. The manorial system allowed large landowners to control their land and its laborers, in the form of peasants or serfs. During the medieval period, the Arab world was critical in the exchange of crops and technology between the European, Asian and African continents. Besides transporting numerous crops, they introduced the concept of summer irrigation to Europe and developed the beginnings of the plantation system of sugarcane growing through the use of slaves for intensive cultivation.

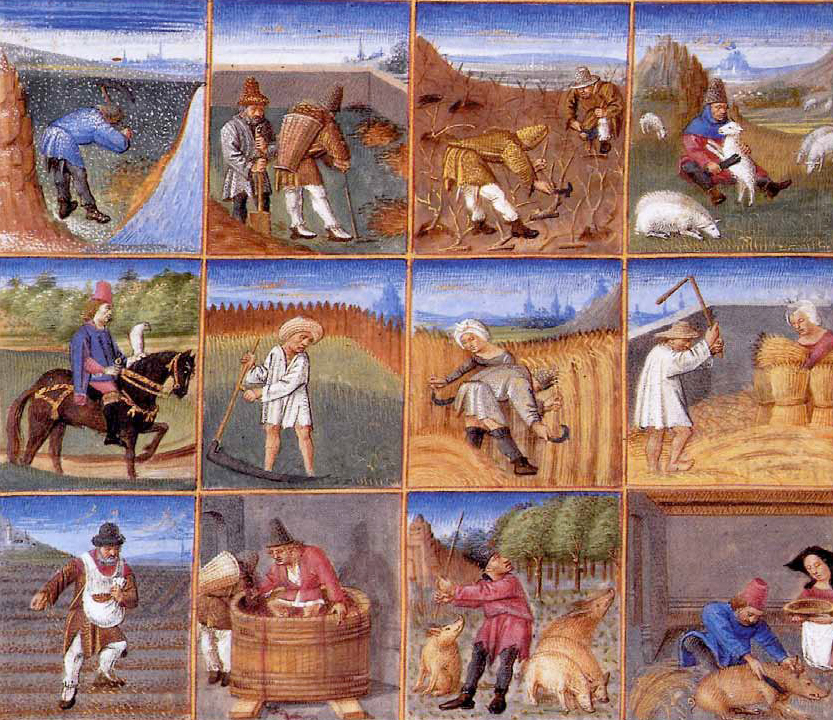
Agricultural calendar, c. 1470, from a manuscript of Pietro de Crescenzi

By AD 900, developments in iron smelting allowed for increased production in Europe, leading to developments in the production of agricultural implements such as ploughs, hand tools and horse shoes. The carruca heavy plough improved on the earlier scratch plough, with the adoption of the Chinese mouldboard plough to turn over the heavy, wet soils of northern Europe. This led to the clearing of northern European forests and an increase in agricultural production, which in turn led to an increase in population. At the same time, some farmers in Europe moved from a two-field crop rotation to a three-field crop rotation in which one field of three was left fallow every year. This resulted in increased productivity and nutrition, as the change in rotations permitted nitrogen-fixing legumes such as peas, lentils and beans. Improved horse harnesses and the whippletree further improved cultivation.

Watermills were introduced by the Romans, but were improved throughout the Middle Ages, along with windmills, and used to grind grains into flour, to cut wood and to process flax and wool.

Crops included wheat, rye, barley and oats. Peas, beans, and vetches became common from the 13th century onward as fodder crops for animals and also for their nitrogen-fixation fertilizing properties. Crop yields peaked in the 13th century, and stayed more or less steady until the 18th century. Though the limitations of medieval farming were once thought to have provided a ceiling for the population growth in the Middle Ages, recent studies have shown that the technology of medieval agriculture was always sufficient for the needs of the people under normal circumstances, and that it was only during exceptionally harsh times, such as the terrible weather of 1315–17, that the needs of the population could not be met.

=== Arab world ===
Noria wheels to lift water for irrigation and household use were among the technologies introduced to Europe via Al-Andalus in the medieval Islamic world.

From the 8th century to the 14th century, the Islamic world underwent a transformation in agricultural practice, described by the historian Andrew Watson as the Arab agricultural revolution. This transformation was driven by a number of factors including the diffusion of many crops and plants along Muslim trade routes, the spread of more advanced farming techniques, and an agricultural-economic system which promoted increased yields and efficiency. The shift in agricultural practice changed the economy, population distribution, vegetation cover, agricultural production, population levels, urban growth, the distribution of the labour force, cooking, diet, and clothing across the Islamic world. Muslim traders covered much of the Old World, and trade enabled the diffusion of many crops, plants and farming techniques across the region, as well as the adaptation of crops, plants and techniques from beyond the Islamic world. This diffusion introduced major crops to Europe by way of Al-Andalus, along with the techniques for their cultivation and cuisine. Sugar cane, rice, and cotton were among the major crops transferred, along with citrus and other fruit trees, nut trees, vegetables such as aubergine, spinach and chard, and the use of imported spices such as cumin, coriander, nutmeg and cinnamon. Intensive irrigation, crop rotation, and agricultural manuals were widely adopted. Irrigation, partly based on Roman technology, made use of noria water wheels, water mills, dams and reservoirs.

=== Columbian exchange ===
After 1492, a global exchange of previously local crops and livestock breeds occurred. Maize, potatoes, sweet potatoes and manioc were the key crops that spread from the New World to the Old, while varieties of wheat, barley, rice and turnips traveled from the Old World to the New. There had been few livestock species in the New World, with horses, cattle, sheep and goats being completely unknown before their arrival with Old World settlers. Crops moving in both directions across the Atlantic Ocean caused population growth around the world and a lasting effect on many cultures in the Early Modern period.

The Harvesters. Pieter Bruegel – 1565

Maize and cassava were introduced from Brazil into Africa by Portuguese traders in the 16th century, becoming staple foods, replacing native African crops. After its introduction from South America to Spain in the late 1500s, the potato became a staple crop throughout Europe by the late 1700s. The potato allowed farmers to produce more food, and initially added variety to the European diet. The increased supply of food reduced disease, increased births and reduced mortality, causing a population boom throughout the British Empire, the US and Europe. The introduction of the potato also brought about the first intensive use of fertilizer, in the form of guano imported to Europe from Peru, and the first artificial pesticide, in the form of an arsenic compound used to fight Colorado potato beetles. Before the adoption of the potato as a major crop, the dependence on grain had caused repetitive regional and national famines when the crops failed, including 17 major famines in England between 1523 and 1623. The resulting dependence on the potato however caused the European Potato Failure, a disastrous crop failure from disease that resulted in widespread famine and the death of over one million people in Ireland alone.

== Modern agriculture ==
=== British agricultural revolution ===
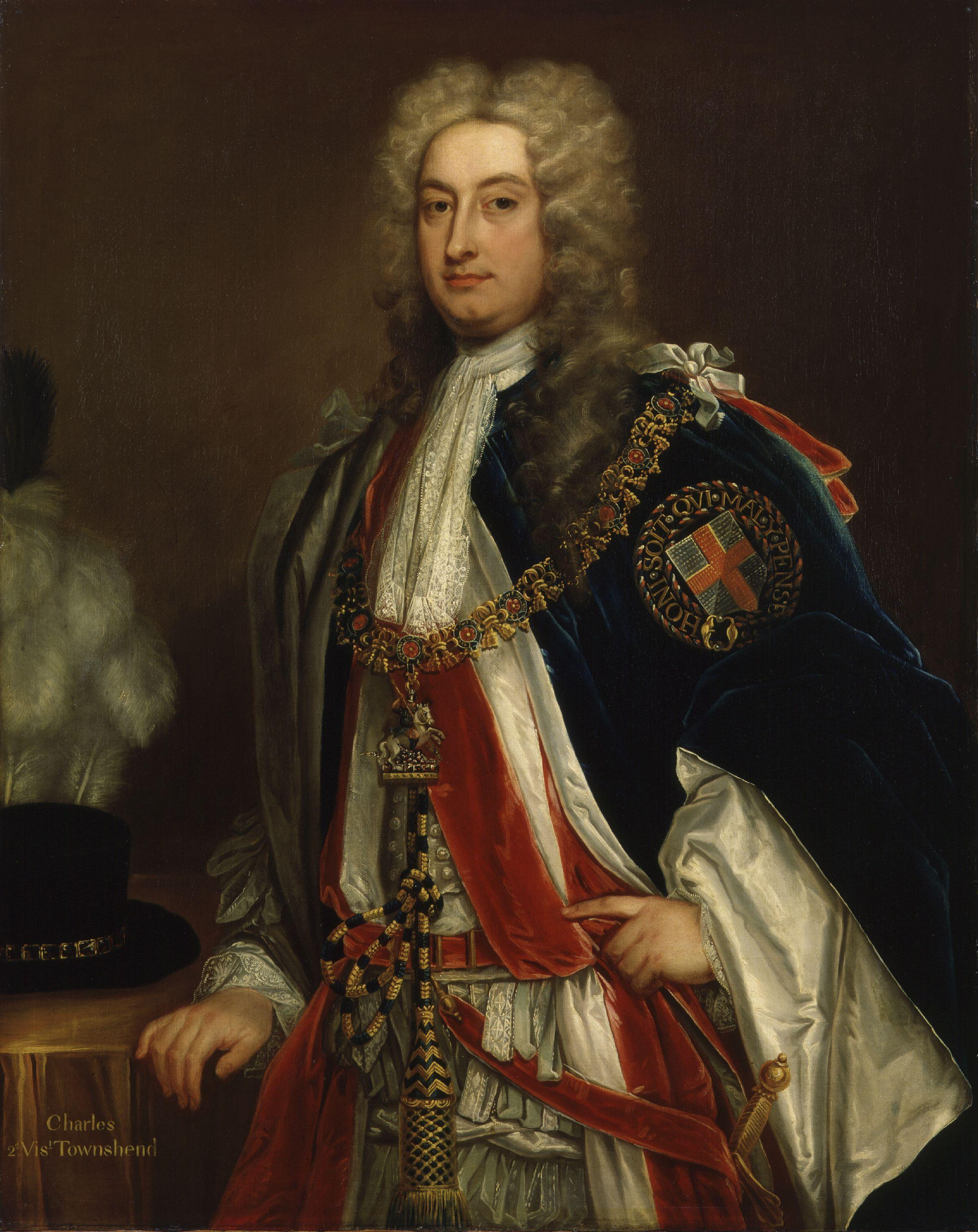
The agriculturalist Charles 'Turnip' Townshend introduced four-field crop rotation and the cultivation of turnips.

Between the 17th century and the mid-19th century, Britain saw a large increase in agricultural productivity and net output. New agricultural practices like enclosure, mechanization, four-field crop rotation to maintain soil nutrients, and selective breeding enabled unprecedented population growth to 5.7 million in 1750, freeing up a significant percentage of the workforce, and thereby helped drive the Industrial Revolution. The productivity of wheat went up from 19 US bushels (670 L; 150 US dry gal; 150 imp gal) per acre in 1720 to around 30 US bushels (1,100 L; 240 US dry gal; 230 imp gal) by 1840, marking a major turning point in history.

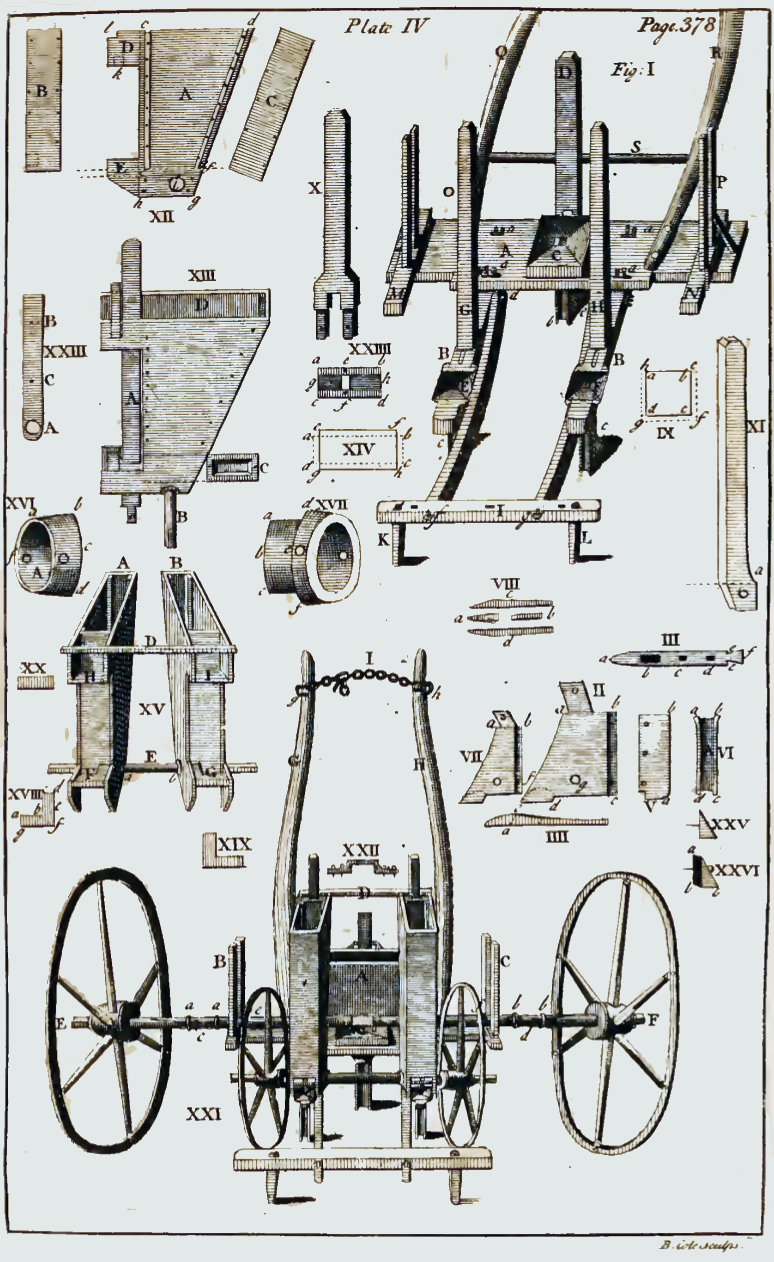
Jethro Tull's seed drill, invented in 1701

Advice on more productive techniques for farming began to appear in England in the mid-17th century, from writers such as Samuel Hartlib, Walter Blith and others. The main problem in sustaining agriculture in one place for a long time was the depletion of nutrients, most importantly nitrogen levels, in the soil. To allow the soil to regenerate, productive land was often let fallow and, in some places, crop rotation was used. The Dutch four-field rotation system was popularised by the British agriculturist Charles Townshend in the 18th century. The system (wheat, turnips, barley and clover) opened up a fodder crop and grazing crop allowing livestock to be bred year-round. The use of clover was especially important as the legume roots replenished soil nitrates. The mechanisation and rationalisation of agriculture was another important factor. Robert Bakewell and Thomas Coke introduced selective breeding and initiated a process of inbreeding to maximise desirable traits from the mid-18th century, such as the New Leicester sheep. Machines were invented to improve the efficiency of various agricultural operations, such as Jethro Tull's seed drill of 1701 that mechanised seeding at the correct depth and spacing and Andrew Meikle's threshing machine of 1784. Ploughs were steadily improved, from Joseph Foljambe's Rotherham iron plough in 1730 to James Small's improved "Scots Plough" metal in 1763. In 1789 Ransomes, Sims & Jefferies was producing 86 plough models for different soils. Powered farm machinery began with Richard Trevithick's stationary steam engine, used to drive a threshing machine, in 1812. Mechanisation spread to additional farm uses throughout the 19th century. The first petrol-driven tractor was built in America by John Froelich in 1892.

John Bennet Lawes began the scientific investigation of fertilization at the Rothamsted Experimental Station in 1843. He investigated the impact of inorganic and organic fertilizers on crop yield and founded one of the first artificial fertilizer manufacturing factories in 1842. Fertilizer, in the shape of sodium nitrate deposits in Chile, was imported to Britain by John Thomas North as well as guano (birds' droppings). The first commercial process for fertilizer production was the obtaining of phosphate from the dissolution of coprolites in sulphuric acid.

=== 20th century ===
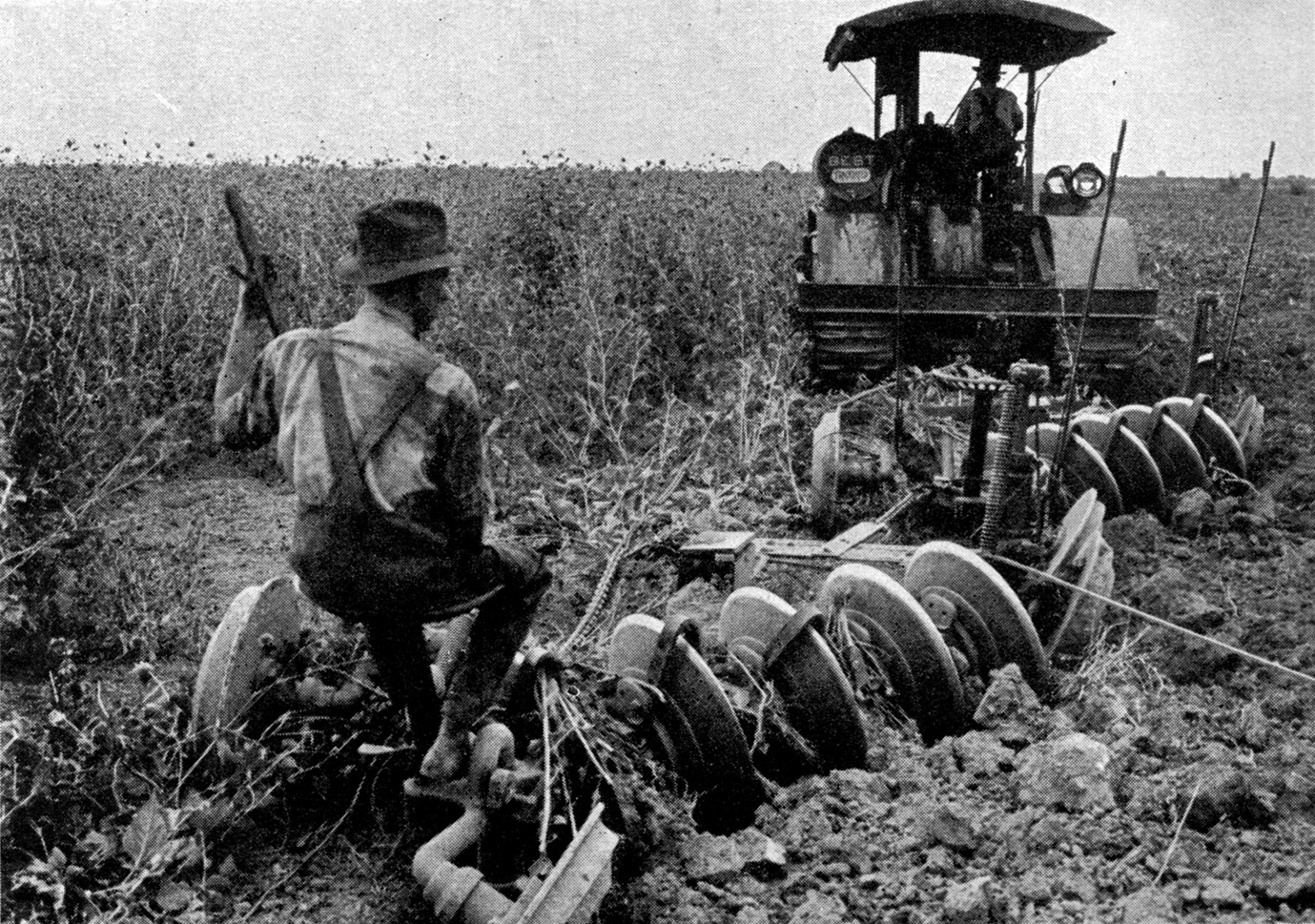
Early 20th-century image of a tractor ploughing an alfalfa field

Dan Albone constructed the first commercially successful gasoline-powered general-purpose tractor in 1901, and the 1923 International Harvester Farmall tractor marked a major point in the replacement of draft animals (particularly horses) with machines. Since that time, self-propelled mechanical harvesters (combines), planters, transplanters and other equipment have been developed, further revolutionizing agriculture. These inventions allowed farming tasks to be done with a speed and on a scale previously impossible, leading modern farms to output much greater volumes of high-quality produce per land unit.

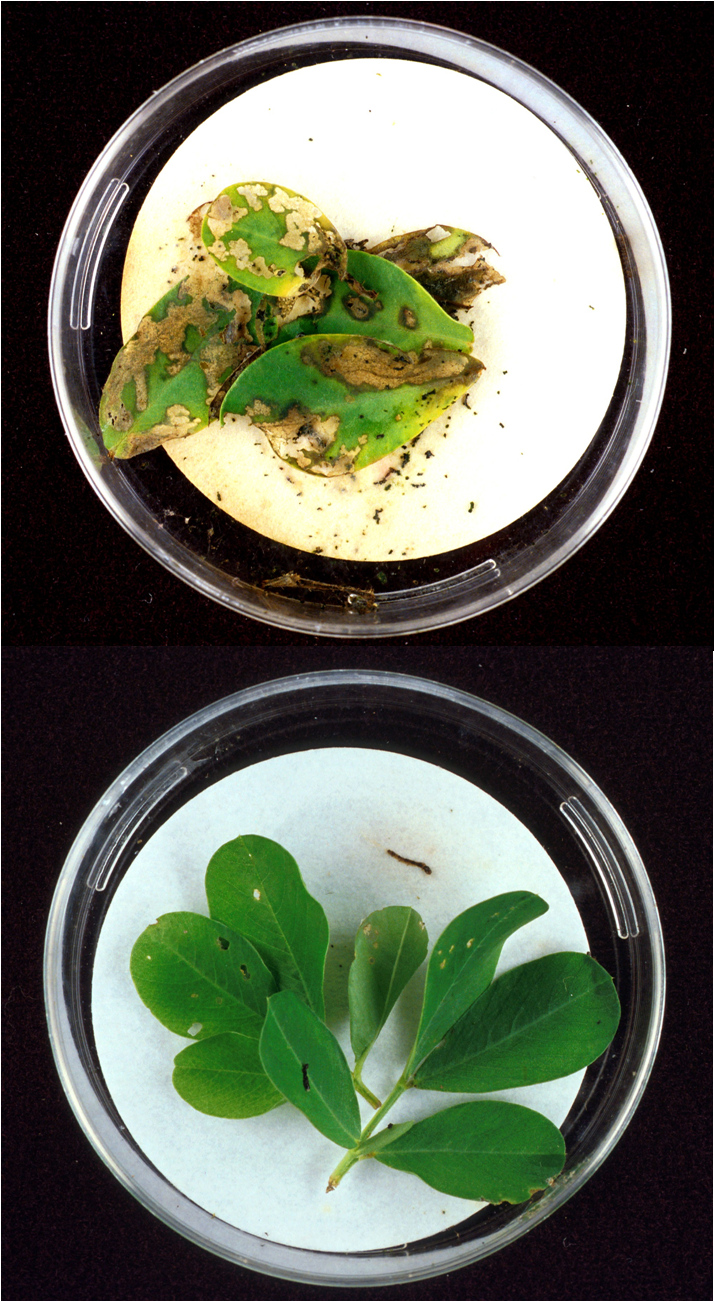
Bt-toxins in genetically modified peanut leaves (bottom) protect from damage by corn borers (top).

The Haber-Bosch method for synthesizing ammonium nitrate represented a major breakthrough and allowed crop yields to overcome previous constraints. It was first patented by German chemist Fritz Haber. In 1910, Carl Bosch, while working for German chemical company BASF, successfully commercialized the process and secured further patents. In the years after World War II, the use of synthetic fertilizer increased rapidly, in sync with the increasing world population.

Collective farming was widely practiced in the Soviet Union, the Eastern Bloc countries, China, and Vietnam, starting in the 1930s in the Soviet Union; one result was the Soviet famine of 1932–33. Another consequence occurred during the Great Leap Forward in China initiated by Mao Tse-tung that resulted in the Great Chinese Famine from 1959 to 1961 and ultimately reshaped the thinking of Deng Xiaoping.

In the past century agriculture has been characterized by increased productivity, the substitution of synthetic fertilizers and pesticides for labour, water pollution, and farm subsidies. Other applications of scientific research since 1950 in agriculture include gene manipulation, hydroponics, and the development of economically viable biofuels such as ethanol.

The number of people involved in farming in industrial countries fell radically from 24 percent of the American population to 1.5 percent in 2002. The number of farms also decreased, and their ownership became more concentrated; for example, between 1967 and 2002, one million pig farms in America consolidated into 114,000, with 80 percent of the production on factory farms. According to the Worldwatch Institute, 74 percent of the world's poultry, 43 percent of beef, and 68 percent of eggs are produced this way.

Famines however continued to sweep the globe through the 20th century. Through the effects of climatic events, government policy, war and crop failure, millions of people died in each of at least ten famines between the 1920s and the 1990s.

=== Green Revolution ===
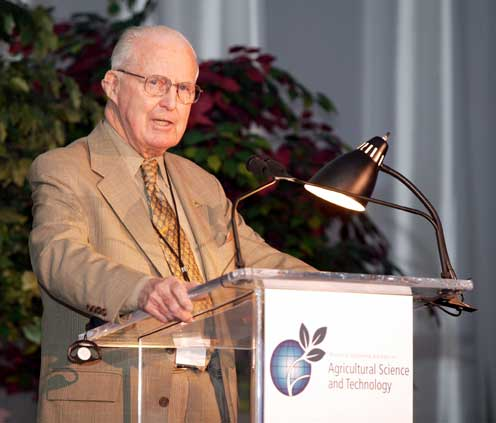
Norman Borlaug, father of the Green Revolution of the 1970s, is credited with saving over a billion people worldwide from starvation.

The Green Revolution was a series of research, development, and technology transfer initiatives between the 1940s and the late 1970s. It increased agricultural production around the world, especially from the late 1960s. The initiatives, led by Norman Borlaug and credited with saving over a billion people from starvation, involved the development of high-yielding varieties of cereal grains, expansion of irrigation infrastructure, modernization of management techniques, distribution of hybridized seeds, synthetic fertilizers, and pesticides to farmers.

Synthetic nitrogen, mined rock phosphate, pesticides, and mechanization greatly increased crop yields in the early 20th century. Increased supply of grains has also led to cheaper livestock. Further, global yield increases were experienced later in the 20th century when high-yield varieties of common staple grains such as rice, wheat, and corn were introduced as a part of the Green Revolution. The Green Revolution exported the technologies (including pesticides and synthetic nitrogen) of the developed world to the developing world. Thomas Malthus famously predicted that the Earth would not be able to support its growing population. Still, technologies such as the Green Revolution have allowed the world to produce a food surplus.

Although the Green Revolution significantly increased rice yields in Asia, yield leveled off. The genetic "yield potential" has increased for wheat, but the yield potential for rice has not increased since 1966, and the yield potential for maize has "barely increased in 35 years". It takes only a decade or two for herbicide-resistant weeds to emerge, and insects become resistant to insecticides within about a decade, delayed somewhat by crop rotation.

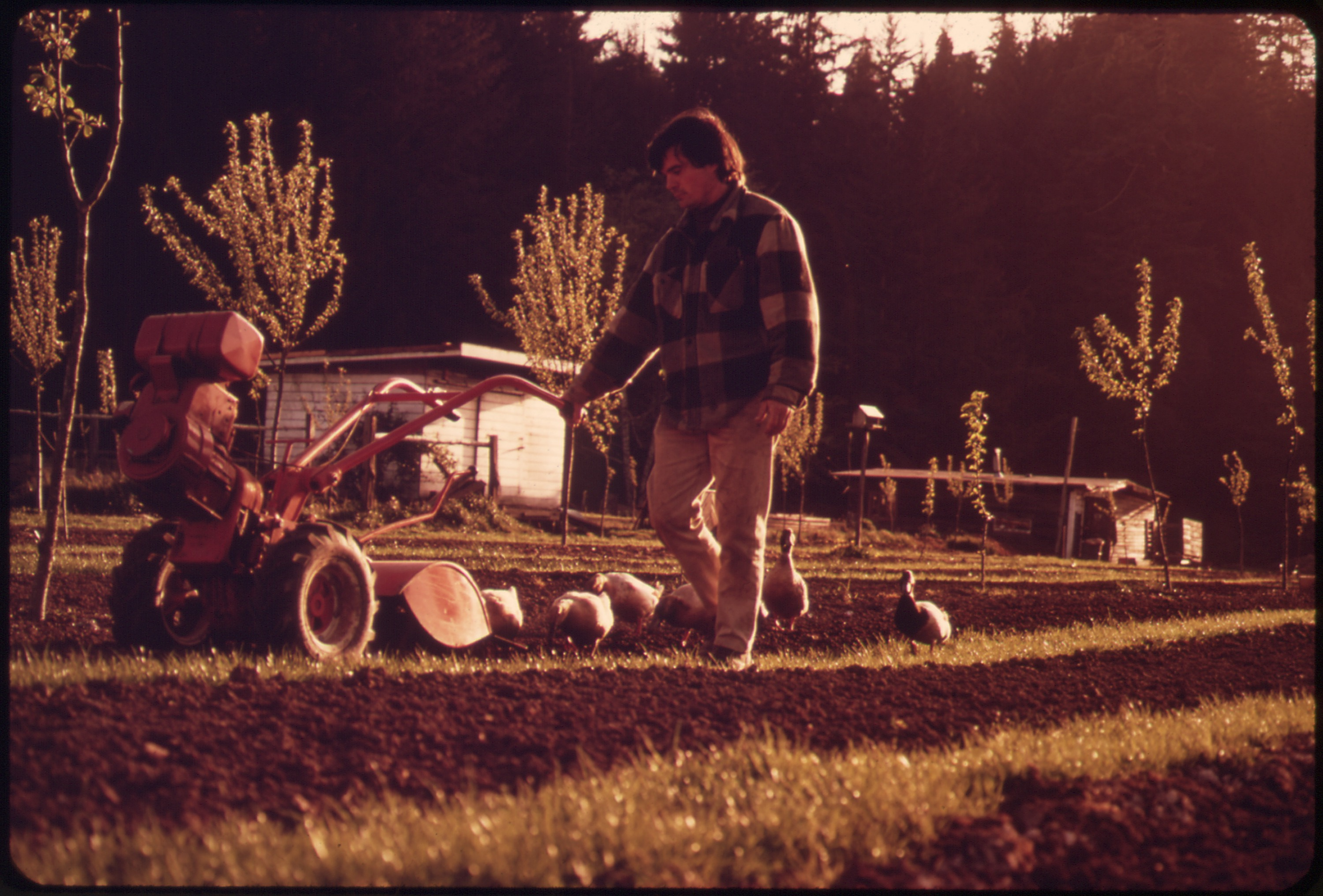
An organic farmer, California, 1972

=== Organic agriculture ===
For most of its history, agriculture has been organic, without synthetic fertilisers or pesticides, and without GMOs. With the advent of chemical agriculture, Rudolf Steiner called for farming without synthetic pesticides, and his Agriculture Course of 1924 laid the foundation for biodynamic agriculture. Lord Northbourne developed these ideas and presented his manifesto of organic farming in 1940. This became a worldwide movement, and organic farming is now practiced in many countries.

== See also ==
- History of food
- Agricultural expansion
- Effects of climate change on agriculture
- Farming/language dispersal hypothesis
- Green Revolution
- Historical hydroculture
- History of cotton
- History of fertilizer
- History of gardening
- History of sugar
- History of the potato
- Rural history
