= Jhansi Lok Sabha constituency =

Indian parliamentary constituency

Coordinates: 25.45°N 78.56°E

Jhansi UP-46
- Lok Sabha constituency

Constituency details
- Country: India
- Region: North India
- State: Uttar Pradesh
- Assembly constituencies: Babina; Jhansi Nagar; Mauranipur; Lalitpur; Mehroni
- Established: 1952
- Reservation: None

Member of Parliament
- 18th Lok Sabha
- Incumbent Anurag Sharma
- Party: BJP
- Alliance: NDA
- Elected year: 2024

Jhansi Lok Sabha constituency is a Lok Sabha (parliamentary) constituency in south-western Uttar Pradesh state in northern India.

The serial number of this constituency in Uttar Pradesh is 46. This constituency includes geographical boundaries of Lalitpur district also (in due south from Jhansi city).

== Assembly segments ==
No	Name	District	Member	Party	2024 Lead
222	Babina	Jhansi	Rajeev Singh Parichha	BJP	BJP
223	Jhansi Nagar	Jhansi	Ravi Sharma	BJP	BJP
224	Mauranipur (SC)	Jhansi	Rashmi Arya	AD(S)	INC
226	Lalitpur	Lalitpur	Ramratan Kushwaha	BJP	BJP
227	Mehroni (SC)	Lalitpur	Manohar Lal Panth	BJP	BJP

== Members of Parliament ==
Year	Member	Party
1952	Raghunath Vinayak Dhulekar	Indian National Congress
1957	Sushila Nayyar	Indian National Congress
1962	Sushila Nayyar	Indian National Congress
1967	Sushila Nayyar	Indian National Congress
1971	Govind Das Richharia	Indian National Congress
1977	Sushila Nayyar	Janata Party
1980	Vishwanath Sharma	Indian National Congress
1984	Sujan Singh Bundela	Indian National Congress
1989	Rajendra Agnihotri	Bharatiya Janata Party
1991	Rajendra Agnihotri	Bharatiya Janata Party
1996	Rajendra Agnihotri	Bharatiya Janata Party
1998	Rajendra Agnihotri	Bharatiya Janata Party
1999	Sujan Singh Bundela	Indian National Congress
2004	Chandrapal Singh Yadav	Samajwadi Party
2009	Pradeep Jain Aditya	Indian National Congress
2014	Uma Bharati	Bharatiya Janata Party
2019	Anurag Sharma	Bharatiya Janata Party
2024	Anurag Sharma	Bharatiya Janata Party

== Election results ==
=== 2024 ===
2024 Indian general election: Jhansi
Party	Candidate	Votes	%	±%
BJP	Anurag Sharma	690,316	50.00	▼8.61
INC	Pradeep Jain Aditya	5,87,702	42.57	▲36.33
BSP	Ravi Prakash	63,192	4.58	▲4.58
NOTA	None of the above	15,302	1.11	▼0.21
Majority		1,02,614	7.43	▼19.06
Turnout		13,80,506	63.88	▼3.80
BJP hold		Swing		

=== 2019 ===
2019 Indian general elections: Jhansi
Party	Candidate	Votes	%	±%
BJP	Anurag Sharma	809,272	58.61	+15.01
SP	Shyam Sundar Singh Yadav	4,43,589	32.12	+2.94
INC	Shiv Sharan Kushwaha	86,139	6.24	−0.13
NOTA	None of the Above	18,239	1.32	+0.26
Majority		3,65,683	26.49	+12.07
Turnout		13,81,130	67.68	−0.69
BJP hold		Swing	+15.01	

=== 2014 Lok Sabha ===
2014 Indian general elections: Jhansi
Party	Candidate	Votes	%	±%
BJP	Sadhvi Uma Sri Bharti	5,75,889	43.60	+34.35
SP	Dr. Chandrapal Singh Yadav	3,85,422	29.18	+13.86
BSP	Anuradha Sharma	2,13,792	16.19	−7.60
INC	Pradeep Jain Aditya	84,089	6.37	−22.95
NOTA	None of the Above	13,959	1.06	+1.06
Majority		1,90,467	14.42	+8.88
Turnout		13,20,867	68.37	+13.20
BJP gain from INC		Swing	+14.28	

=== 1996 Lok Sabha ===
1996 Indian general election: Jhansi
Party	Candidate	Votes	%	±%
BJP	Rajendra Agnihotri	1,63,836	23.84	
SP	Har Govind Kushwaha	1,34,152	19.52	
BSP	Chhanga Prasad Sahu	1,30,281	18.95	
INC	Sujan Singh Bundela	1,14,374	16.64	
Majority		29,684	4.32	
Turnout		6,87,216	53.76	
BJP hold		Swing		

=== 1977 Lok Sabha ===
1977 Indian general election: Jhansi
Party	Candidate	Votes	%	±%
JP	Sushila Nayyar	2,22,118	65.49	
INC	Govind Das Richharia	91,633	27.02	
Independent	Ramesh Chandra Tripathi	13,882	4.09	
Independent	Jagdish Chandra Mehra	11,542	3.40	
Majority		1,30,485	38.47	
Turnout		3,39,175	53.54	
JP gain from INC		Swing		

=== 1971 Lok Sabha ===
- Govind Dass Richharia (INC) : 143,137 votes
- Sushila Nayar (NCO) : 68,566

== See also ==
- Jhansi district
- List of constituencies of the Lok Sabha
