= Mehroni Assembly constituency =

Constituency of the Uttar Pradesh legislative assembly in India

Coordinates: 24.58°N 78.73°E

Mehroni
- Constituency No. 227 for the Uttar Pradesh Legislative Assembly

Constituency details
- Country: India
- Region: North India
- State: Uttar Pradesh
- District: Lalitpur
- Total electors: 4,49,905
- Reservation: SC

Member of Legislative Assembly
- 18th Uttar Pradesh Legislative Assembly
- Incumbent Manohar Lal Panth
- Party: Bharatiya Janta Party
- Elected year: 2022

Mehroni is a constituency of the Uttar Pradesh Legislative Assembly covering the city of Mehroni in the Lalitpur district of Uttar Pradesh, India. Mahroni is one of five assembly constituencies in the Jhansi Lok Sabha constituency. Since 2008, this assembly constituency is numbered 227 amongst 403 constituencies.

Currently, this seat is represented by Bharatiya Janata Party candidate Manohar Lal who won in the 2022 Uttar Pradesh Legislative Assembly election, defeating Kiran Ramesh Khatik of the Bahujan Samaj Party by a margin of 110451 votes.

== Members of Legislative Assembly ==
Election	Name	Party
1952	Ram Nath Kher	Indian National Congress
1962	Krishna Chand Sharma	Indian National Congress
1967	Raghunath Singh	Bharatiya Jana Sangh
1969	Krishna Chand Sharma	Indian National Congress
1974	Raghunath Singh	Bharatiya Jana Sangh
1977	Ranvir Singh	Janata Party
1980	Sujan Singh Bundela	Indian National Congress (I)
1985	Devendra Kumar Singh	Bharatiya Janata Party
1989	Devendra Kumar Singh	Bharatiya Janata Party
1991	Sujan Singh Bundela	Indian National Congress
1993	Devendra Kumar Singh	Bharatiya Janata Party
1996	Puran Singh Bundela	Indian National Congress
2002	Puran Singh Bundela	Bharatiya Janata Party
2007	Ram Kumar Tiwari	Bahujan Samaj Party
2012	Feran Lal	Bahujan Samaj Party
2017	Manohar Lal Panth	Bharatiya Janata Party
2022	Manohar Lal Panth	Bharatiya Janata Party

== Results ==
=== 2027 ===
2027 Uttar Pradesh Legislative Assembly election: Mehroni
Party	Candidate	Votes	%	±%
INDIA				
NDA				
BSP				
NOTA	None of the above			
Majority				
Turnout				
gain from		Swing		

=== 2022 ===
2022 Uttar Pradesh Legislative Assembly Election: Mehroni
Party	Candidate	Votes	%	±%
BJP	Manohar Lal	184,778	54.86	3.1
BSP	Kiran Ramesh Khatik	74327	22.07	2.66
SP	Ram Vilas	58381	17.33	8.55
INC	Brijlal Khabri	4344	1.29	−12.74
NOTA	None of the Above	3295	0.98	−0.37
Majority		110451	32.79	0.44
Turnout		336798	74.86	0.7

=== 2017 ===
2017 Uttar Pradesh Legislative Assembly Election: Mehroni
Party	Candidate	Votes	%	±%
BJP	Manohar Lal	159,291	51.76	
BSP	Feran Lal	59727	19.41	
INC	Brij Lal Khabri	43171	14.03	
SP	Ramesh Khatik	27031	8.78	
CPI	Aradhana	4603	1.5	
Independent	Sukh Dayal	1939	0.63	
Independent	Ram Lal	1868	0.61	
Independent	Manoj Kumar	1492	0.48	
Unknown	Dashrath	1217	0.4	
Independent	Pritam Lal	1057	0.34	
Independent	Jitendra	786	0.26	
Independent	Kanhaiya	741	0.24	
Jan Adhikar Party	Rakesh Kumar	738	0.24	
NOTA	None of the Above	4092	1.35	
Majority		99564	32.35	
Turnout		307753	74.16	
