= KHS =

KHS can stand for:

== Businesses ==
- KHS GmbH, a German manufacturer of packaging and bottling machinery
- KHS Bicycles, an American and Taiwan-based bicycle manufacturer
- KHS Musical Instruments, a Taiwan-based musical instrument manufacturer

== Schools ==
- Kagman High School, a public (government) school in Saipan, Saipan, CNMI, US
- Kaiserslautern High School, a Department of Defense operated international school in Kaiserslautern, Germany
- Keira High School, in North Wollongong, New South Wales, Australia
- Kents Hill School, an independent college-preparatory school in Kents Hill, Maine, USA
- Kingsley High School (Michigan), a public high school in Kingsley, Michigan
- Kingston High School (New York), a comprehensive four-year school in Kingston, New York
- Kingswood House School, a prep school in Epsom, England
- Kirkwood High School, a public secondary school in Kirkwood, Missouri
- Kong Hwa School, a primary school in Singapore
- Kurtköy High School, a secondary public anatolian school in Pendik, Turkey

== Societies ==
- Kasturba Health Society, in Sevagram, Wardha, Maharashtra, India
- Kentucky Historical Society

== Other uses ==
- Knight of the Order of the Holy Sepulchre, a chivalric order (KHS)
- Khasab Airport, in Khasab, Oman, which goes by the IATA code of KHS
- Karate High School, a pop-punk/post-hardcore band from San Francisco, California, USA
- Kurt Hugo Schneider, American musician and producer, also credited as KHS
- Potassium hydrosulfide, chemical formula KHS
