= Vishwanath Sharma (disambiguation) =

Vishwanath Sharma (or Vishwa Nath Sharma, Vishvanatha Sharma) may refer to:

- Vishvanatha Sharma (fl. 1736), 18th-century Sanskrit scholar and author of the Vrataraja
- Vishwanath Sharma (1939–2017), Indian politician and Member of Parliament from Jhansi and Hamirpur
- Vishwa Nath Sharma (1930–2026), Indian Army general who served as Chief of the Army Staff (1988–1990)

== See also ==
- Vishvanatha Daivajna (fl. 1578–1612), 16th/17th-century Indian astronomer and commentator
- Vishwambhar Nath Sharma (1899–1945), Indian writer of Hindi short stories
