= Bihari Lal Arya =

Indian politician

Biharilal Arya

Minister of State for Ministry of Micro, Small and Medium Enterprises
- In office 1996–1997
- President: Shankar Dayal Sharma
- Prime Minister: Atal Bihari Vajpayee
- Governor: Bezawada Gopala Reddy
- Vice President: K. R. Narayanan
- Constituency: Mauranipur

Personal details
- Born: Biharilal Arya; 1 January 1962 (age 64) Ranipur, Jhansi district, Uttar Pradesh, India
- Citizenship: Indian
- Party: Bhartiya Janata Party
- Other political affiliations: Indian National Congress, Akhil Bharatiya Loktantrik Congress
- Spouse: Shanti Biharilal Arya
- Parent: Chaturbhuj Arya
- Profession: Businessman

Biharilal Chaturbhuj Arya is an Indian politician, Social worker and former member of the Uttar Pradesh Legislative Assembly for Mauranipur constituency of Uttar Pradesh, India. He is a member of Bharatiya Janata Party and won the 2017 Uttar Pradesh Legislative Assembly election from Mauranipur constituency. In the 2017 election, he defeated Rashmi Arya by 17 thousand votes. Then Rashmi was a Samajwadi Party member. Bihari Lal Arya is originally a Congressman but in 2017 he had joined BJP before the elections. Biharilal became an MLA for the fourth time in 2017. Prior to this, he was MLA from Congress three times. he also was a minister in Kalyan Singh government formed in 1996. Arya belongs to the Koli caste of Bundelkhand in Uttar Pradesh.

== Political career ==
Bihari Lal Arya is a Congressman but in 2017 he had joined BJP before the elections. Biharilal became an MLA for the fourth time in 2017. Prior to this he was MLA from Congress three times. he also was a minister in Kalyan Singh's government formed in 1996. Arya came to be popular at the state level when, while being a Congress MLA, he formed the BJP government in the state. Then Biharilal became MLA from Congress for the second time in 1996 after 1993. After the 1996 elections, no party had got a majority. President's rule was imposed in the state. In 1997, Mayawati's government was formed with the help of BJP, but after 6 months the government fell. A coalition government was formed under the leadership of BJP's Kalyan Singh. Then Naresh Aggarwal of Congress formed a party called Democratic Congress and broke the Congress MLAs and got the Kalyan Singh government formed. Biharilal Arya also went to the Democratic Congress. To support the government, Kalyan Singh made him a minister of state in the small industries department. Elections came again in the year 2002. Bihari Lal again fought with Congress but this time his victory chariot stopped. He was defeated by Pragilal Ahirwar of BJP. In the 2007 elections, Biharilal again contested from the Congress but lost. This time Bhagwati Prasad Sagar of BSP defeated him. The same situation remained in the 2012 elections as well. He was defeated by Rashmi Arya of SP. By the year 2017 he joined BJP. Bihari Lal Arya finally left Congress and joined BJP and again became MLA from Mauranipur. This time he defeated Rashmi Arya of SP.
