= Results of the 2012 Uttar Pradesh Legislative Assembly election =

The election for the Sixteenth Legislative Assembly of Uttar Pradesh, a multi party contest, the Samajwadi party beating most of the exit polls which were pointing the hung assembly, secured a comfortable majority of 224 in a house of 403 outperforming the ruling BSP and other national parties, the INC and the BJP. The BSP strength in the assembly was greatly reduced to 80 seats, the BJP with 47 seats followed by the Congress with 28 seats. Mayawati, the incumbent Chief Minister tendered her resignation on 6 March 2012 marking the distinction of being the first to complete full five years in office.

== List of Winning Candidates ==
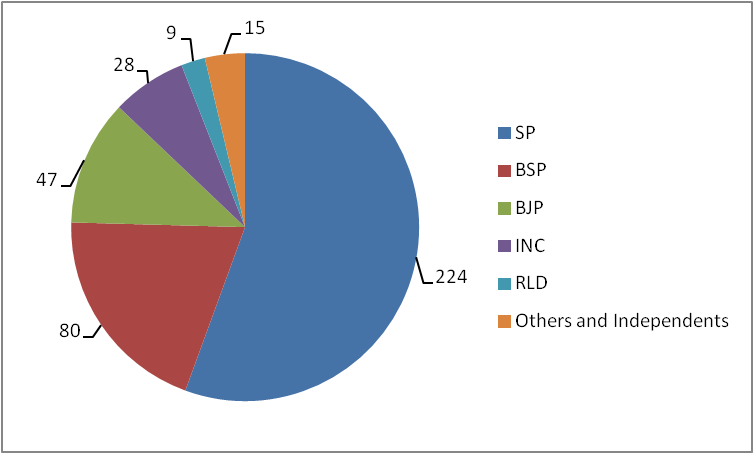
Seats won by parties in the election

List of constituency-wise winner candidates and parties
Sr.No	Constituency	Winning candidate	Party	Runner Candidate	Party
1	Behat	Mahaveer Singh Rana	BSP	Naresh	INC
2	Nakur	Dharam Singh Saini	BSP	Imran Masood	INC
3	Saharanpur Nagar	Raghav Lakhanpal	BJP	Saleem Ahmed	INC
4	Saharanpur	Jagpal	BSP	Ch. Abdul Wahid	INC
5	Deoband	Rajendra Singh Rana	SP	Manoj Chaudhary	BSP
6	Rampur Maniharan (SC)	Ravinder Kumar Molhu	BSP	Vinod Kumar Tejyan	INC
7	Gangoh	Pardeep Kumar	INC	Ruder Sain	SP
8	Kairana	Hukum Singh	BJP	Anwar Hasan	BSP
9	Thana Bhawan	Suresh Rana	BJP	Ashraf Ali Khan	RLD
10	Shamli	Pankaj Kumar Malik	INC	Choudhary Virender Singh	SP
11	Budhana	Nawazish Alam Khan	SP	Rajpal Singh Baliyan	RLD
12	Charthawal	Noor Saleem Rana	BSP	Vijay Kumar Kashyap	BJP
13	Purqazi (SC)	Anil Kumar	BSP	Deepak Kumar	INC
14	Muzaffar Nagar	Chitranjan Swaroop	SP	Ashok Kansal	BJP
15	Khatauli	Kartar Singh Bhadana	RLD	Tara Chand Shastri	BSP
16	Meerapur	Jamil Ahmad Qasmi	BSP	Mithlesh Pal	RLD
17	Najibabad	Tasleem	BSP	Rajeev Kumar Agarwal	BJP
18	Nagina (SC)	Manoj Kumar Paras	SP	Omwati Devi	BSP
19	Barhapur	Mohd.Ghazi	BSP	Indra Dev Singh	BJP
20	Dhampur	Th. Mool Chand Chauhan	SP	Ashok Kumar Rana	BSP
21	Nehtaur (SC)	Om Kumar	BSP	Raj Kumar	SP
22	Bijnor	Kunvar Bharatendra	BJP	Mahboob	BSP
23	Chandpur	Iqbal	BSP	Shairbaz Khan	SP
24	Noorpur	Lokendra Singh	BJP	Mohd.Usmaan	BSP
25	Kanth	Aneesurrehman	PECP	Rizwan Ahmad Khan	BSP
26	Thakurdwara	Kunwar Sarvesh Kumar	BJP	Vijay Kumar	MD
27	Moradabad Rural	Shameemul Haq	SP	Suresh Chandra Saini	BJP
28	Moradabad Nagar	Mohammad Yusuf Ansari	SP	Ritesh Kumar Gupta	BJP
29	Kundarki	Mohammad Rizwan	SP	Ramveer Singh	BJP
30	Bilari	Mhd.Irfan	SP	Lakhan Singh Saini	BSP
31	Chandausi (SC)	Laxmi Gautam	SP	Gulab Devi	BJP
32	Asmoli	Pinki Singh	SP	Aqeel Ur Rehman Khan	BSP
33	Sambhal	Iqbal Mehmood	SP	Rajesh Singhal	BJP
34	Suar	Nawab Kazim Ali Khan	INC	Laxmi Saini	BJP
35	Chamraua	Ali Yusuf Ali	BSP	Naseer Ahmad Khan	SP
36	Bilaspur	Sanjay Kapoor	INC	Beena Bhardwaj	SP
37	Rampur	Mohammad Azam Khan	SP	Dr. Tanveer Ahmad Khan	INC
38	Milak (SC)	Vijay Singh	SP	Chandra Pal Singh	INC
39	Dhanaura (SC)	Maikal Chandra	SP	Hem Singh	BSP
40	Naugawan Sadat	Ashfaq Ali Khan	SP	Rahul Kumar	BSP
41	Amroha	Mehboob Ali	SP	Ram Singh	BJP
42	Hasanpur	Kamal Akhtar	SP	Ganga Saran	BSP
43	Siwalkhas	Ghulam Mohammed	SP	Yashvir Singh	RLD
44	Sardhana	Sangeet Singh Som	BJP	Hazi Mohammad Yaqub	RLD
45	Hastinapur (SC)	Prabhu Dayal Balmiki	SP	Yogesh Verma	PECP
46	Kithore	Shahid Manzoor	SP	Lakhi Ram Nagar	BSP
47	Meerut Cantt	Satya Prakash Agarwal	BJP	Sunil Kumar Wadhwa	BSP
48	Meerut	Dr. Laxmikant Bajpai	BJP	Rafeeq Ansari	SP
49	Meerut South	Ravindra Bhadana	BJP	Haji Rashid Akhlaq	BSP
50	Chhaprauli	Vir Pal	RLD	Dev Pal Singh	BSP
51	Baraut	Lokesh Dixit	BSP	Ashwani Kumar	RLD
52	Baghpat	Hemlata Chaudhary	BSP	Kawkab Hameed Khan	RLD
53	Loni	Zakir Ali	BSP	Madan Bhaiya	RLD
54	Muradnagar	Wahab	BSP	Rajpal Tyagi	SP
55	Sahibabad	Amarpal	BSP	Sunil Kumar Sharma	BJP
56	Ghaziabad	Suresh Bansal	BSP	Atul Garg	BJP
57	Modi Nagar	Sudesh Sharma	RLD	Rajpal Singh	BSP
58	Dholana	Dharmesh Singh Tomar	SP	Aslam	BSP
59	Hapur (SC)	Gajraj Singh	INC	Dharampal Singh	BSP
60	Garhmukteshwar	Madan Chauhan	SP	Farhat Hasan	BSP
61	Noida	Mahesh Kumar Sharma	BJP	Omdutt Sharma	BSP
62	Dadri	Satveer Singh Gurjar	BSP	Nawab Singh Nagar	BJP
63	Jewar	Vedram Bhati	BSP	Dhirendra Singh	INC
64	Sikandrabad	Bimla Singh Solanki	BJP	Saleem Akhtar Khan	BSP
65	Bulandshahr	Mohd. Aleem Khan	BSP	Virendra Singh Sirohi	BJP
66	Syana	Dilnawaz Khan	INC	Devendera Bhardwaj	BSP
67	Anupshahr	Gajendra Singh	BSP	Syed Himayat Ali	SP
68	Debai	Shri Bhagwan Sharma	SP	Rajveer Singh	JaKP
69	Shikarpur	Mukesh Sharma	SP	Anil Kumar	BSP
70	Khurja (SC)	Banshi Singh Pahadiya	INC	Horam Singh	BSP
71	Khair (SC)	Bhagwati Prasad	RLD	Rajrani	BSP
72	Barauli	Dalveer Singh	RLD	Thakur Jayveer Singh	BSP
73	Atrauli	Viresh Yadav	SP	Prem Lata Devi	JaKP
74	Chharra	Rakesh Kumar	SP	Mool Chand Baghel	BSP
75	Koil	Zameer Ullah Khan	SP	Vivek Bansal	INC
76	Aligarh	Zafar Alam	SP	Ashutosh Varshney	BJP
77	Iglas (SC)	Triloki Ram	RLD	Rajendra Kumar	BSP
78	Hathras (SC)	Genda Lal Chaudhary	BSP	Rajesh Kumar	BJP
79	Sadabad	Devendra Agrawal	SP	Satendra Sharma	BSP
80	Sikandra Rao	Ramveer Upadhyay	BSP	Yashpal Singh Chauhan	SP
81	Chhata	Tejpal Singh	RLD	Laxminarayan	BSP
82	Mant	Jayant Chaudhary	RLD	Pt. Shyam Sunder Sharma Pachahara	AITC
83	Goverdhan	Rajkumar Rawat	BSP	Megh Shyam Singh	RLD
84	Mathura	Pradeep Mathur	INC	Devendra Kumar Sharma	BJP
85	Baldev (SC)	Pooran Prakash	RLD	Chandrabhan Singh	BSP
86	Etmadpur	Dr. Dharampal Singh	BSP	Dr. Prem Singh Baghel	SP
87	Agra Cantt. (SC)	Gutiyari Lal Duwesh	BSP	Girraj Singh Dharmesh (G.S. Dharmesh)	BJP
88	Agra South	Yogendra Upadhyaya	BJP	Zulfiquar Ahmed Bhutto	BSP
89	Agra South	Jagan Prasad Garg	BJP	Rajesh Kumar Agrawal	BSP
90	Agra Rural (SC)	Kali Charan Suman	BSP	Hemlata	SP
91	Fatehpur Sikri	Surajpal Singh	BSP	Rajkumar Chahar	IND
92	Kheragarh	Bhagvan Singh Kushwaha	BSP	Rani Pakshalika Singh	SP
93	Fatehabad	Chotelal Verma	BSP	Rajendra Singh	SP
94	Bah	Raja Mahendra Aridaman Singh	SP	Madhusudan Sharma	BSP
95	Tundla (SC)	Rakesh Babu	BSP	Akhlesh Kumar	SP
96	Jasrana	Ramveer Singh	SP	Ram Gopal (Pappu Lodhi)	BSP
97	Firozabad	Manish Asiza	BJP	Azim Bhai	SP
98	Shikohabad	Om Prakash Verma	SP	Dr.Mukesh Verma	BSP
99	Sirsaganj	Hariom	SP	E. Atul Pratap Singh	BSP
100	Kasganj	Man Pal Singh	SP	Hasrat Ullah Sherwani	BSP
101	Amanpur	Mamtesh	BSP	Virendra Singh	SP
102	Patiyali	Najeeva Khan Zeenat	SP	Suraj Singh Shakya	BSP
103	Aliganj	Rameshwar Singh	SP	Sanghmitra Maurya	BSP
104	Etah	Ashish Kumar Yadav	SP	Gajendra Singh Babloo	BSP
105	Marhara	Amit Gaurav	SP	Virendra	JaKP
106	Jalesar (SC)	Ranjeet Suman	SP	Omprakash Dalit	BSP
107	Mainpuri	Rajkumar Alias Raju Yadav	SP	Rama Shakya	BSP
108	Bhongaon	Alok Kumar	SP	Ashish Singh Alias Rahul Rathor	BSP
109	Kishani (SC)	Eng. Brajesh Katheriya	SP	Km. Sandhya	BSP
110	Karhal	Sobaran Singh Yadav	SP	Jaivir Singh	BSP
111	Gunnaur	Ramkhiladi Singh Yadav	SP	Ajit Kumar Urf Raju Yadav	INC
112	Bisauli (SC)	Ashutosh Maurya Urf Raju	SP	Priti Sagar Urf Pushpa Rani	BSP
113	Sahaswan	Omkar Singh	SP	Mir Hadi Ali Alias Babar Mian	BSP
114	Bilsi	Musarrat Ali Bittan	BSP	Vimal Krishan Aggrawal	SP
115	Badaun	Abid Raza Khan	SP	Mahesh Chandra Gupta	BJP
116	Shekhupur	Ashish Yadav	SP	Bhagvan Singh Shakya	INC
117	Dataganj	Sinod Kumar Shakya (Deepu)	BSP	Prempal Singh Yadav	SP
118	Baheri	Ataurrehman	SP	Chhatra Pal Singh	BJP
119	Meerganj	Sultan Baig	BSP	Dr.D.C Verma	BJP
120	Bhojipura	Shazil Islam	IEMC	Virendra Singh Gangwar	SP
121	Nawabganj	Bhagwat Saran Gangwar	SP	Usha Gangwar	BSP
122	Faridpur (SC)	Dr. Siaram Sagar	SP	Dr. Shyam Bihari	BJP
123	Bithari Chainpur	Virendra Singh	BSP	Dharmendra Kumar	SP
124	Bareilly	Dr. Arun Kumar	BJP	Dr. Anil Sharma	SP
125	Bareilly Cantt	Rajesh Agarwal	BJP	Fahim Sabir Ansari	SP
126	Aonla	Dharm Pal Singh	BJP	Mahipal Singh Yadav	SP
127	Pilibhit	Riaz Ahmad	SP	Sanjay Singh Gangwar	BSP
128	Barkhera	Hemraj Verma	SP	Jaidrath Alias Prawaktanand	BJP
129	Puranpur (SC)	Peetam Ram	SP	Babu Ram	BJP
130	Bisalpur	Agys Ramsaran Verma	BJP	Anis Ahmad Khan Alias Phool Babu	INC
131	Katra	Rajesh Yadav	SP	Rajeev Kashyap	BSP
132	Jalalabad	Neeraj Kushawaha	BSP	Sharad Vir Singh	SP
133	Tilhar	Roshan Lal Verma	BSP	Anwar Ali Urf Zaki Ur Rahman	SP
134	Powayan (SC)	Sakuntla Devi	SP	Arun Kumar Sagar	BSP
135	Shahjahanpur	Suresh Kumar Khanna	BJP	Tanveer Khan	SP
136	Dadraul	Rammurti Singh Verma	SP	Rizwan Ali	BSP
137	Palia	Harvindar Kumar Sahani Alias Romi Sahani	BSP	Krishna Gopal Patel	SP
138	Nighasan	Ajay	BJP	R A Usmani	SP
139	Gola Gokrannath	Vinay Tiwari	SP	Simmi Bano	BSP
140	Sri Nagar (SC)	Ramsaran	SP	Sripal Bhargva	BSP
141	Dhaurahra	Shamsher Bahadur Alias Sheroobhaiya	BSP	Yashpal Chowdhary	SP
142	Lakhimpur	Utkarsh Verma Madhur	SP	Gyan Prakash Bajpai	BSP
143	Kasta (SC)	Sunil Kumar Lala	SP	Saurabh Singh Sonu	BSP
144	Mohammdi	Awasthi Bala Prasad	BSP	Imran Ahamad	SP
145	Maholi	Anoop Kumar Gupta	SP	Mahesh Chandra Mishra	BSP
146	Sitapur	Radheyshyam Jaiswal	SP	Ayub Khan	BSP
147	Hargaon (SC)	Ramhet Bharti	BSP	R.P Chowdhary	SP
148	Laharpur	Mo. Jasmir Ansari	BSP	Anil Kumar Verma	INC
149	Biswan	Rampal Yadav	SP	Nirmal Verma	BSP
150	Sevata	Mahendra Kumar Singh	SP	Ammar Rizvi	INC
151	Mahmoodabad	Narendra Singh Verma	SP	Ahmad Anshari	BSP
152	Sidhauli (SC)	Manish Rawat	SP	Dr. Hargovind Bhargav	BSP
153	Misrikh (SC)	Ram Pal Rajwanshi	SP	Manish Kumar Rawat	BSP
154	Sawaijpur	Rajani Tiwari	BSP	Padamarag Singh Yadav	JaKP
155	Shahabad	Babu Khan	SP	Asif Khan	BSP
156	Hardoi	Nitin Agrawal	SP	Raja Bux Singh	BSP
157	Gopamau (SC)	Shyam Prakash	SP	Aneeta Verma	BSP
158	Sandi (SC)	Rajeshwari	SP	Virendra Kumar	BSP
159	Bilgram-Mallanwan	Brijesh Kumar	BSP	Krishna Kumar Singh Alias Satish Verma	SP
160	Balamau (SC)	Anil Verma	SP	Rampal Verma	BSP
161	Sandila	Kunwar Mahabir Singh	SP	Abdul Mannan	BSP
162	Bangermau	Badlu Khan	SP	Mohd. Irshad Khan	BSP
163	Safipur (SC)	Sudhir Kumar	SP	Ram Baran	BSP
164	Mohan (SC)	Radhey Lal Rawat	BSP	Mast Ram	BJP
165	Unnao	Deepak Kumar	SP	Pankaj Gupta	BJP
166	Bhagwantnagar	Kuldeep Singh Sengar	SP	Poonam Shukla	BJP
167	Purwa	Uday Raj	SP	Narendra Singh Lodhi	BSP
168	Malihabad (SC)	Indal Kumar	SP	Kaushal Kishore	RCP
169	Bakshi Kaa Talab	Gomti Yadav	SP	Nakul Dubey	BSP
170	Sarojini Nagar	Sharda Pratap Shukla	SP	Shiv Shanker Singh (Shankari)	BSP
171	Lucknow West	Mohd Rehan	SP	Suresh Kumar Shrivastav	BJP
172	Lucknow North	Abhishek Mishra	SP	Dr. Neeraj Bora	INC
173	Lucknow East	Kalraj Mishra	BJP	Juhie Singh	SP
174	Lucknow Central	Ravidas Mehrotra	SP	Vidya Sagar Gupta	BJP
175	Lucknow Cantt	Prof. Rita Bahuguna Joshi	INC	Suresh Chandra Tiwari	BJP
176	Mohanlalganj (SC)	Chandra Rawat	SP	Ajey Pushpa Rawat	BSP
177	Bachhrawan (SC)	Ram Lal Akela	SP	Sushil Kumar Pasi	RSBP
178	Tiloi	Dr. Mohd. Muslim	INC	Mayankeshwar Sharan Singh	SP
179	Harchandpur	Surendra Vikram Singh	SP	Shiv Ganesh Lodhi	INC
180	Rae Bareli	Akhilesh Kumar Singh	PECP	Ram Pratap Yadav	SP
181	Salon (SC)	Ashakishore	SP	Shiv Balak Pasi	INC
182	Sareni	Devendra Pratap Singh	SP	Sushil Kumar	BSP
183	Unchahar	Manoj Kumar Pandey	SP	Utkrist Maurya	BSP
184	Jagdishpur (SC)	Radhey Shyam	INC	Vijay Kumar	SP
185	Gauriganj	Rakesh Pratap Singh	SP	Mohammad Nayeem	INC
186	Amethi	Gayatri Prasad	SP	Ameeta Sinh	INC
187	Isauli	Abrar Ahmad	SP	Yash Bhadra Singh (Monu)	PECP
188	Sultanpur	Anoop Sanda	SP	Mohd. Tahir Khan	BSP
189	Sadar	Arun Kumar	SP	Raj Prasad	BSP
190	Lambhua	Santosh Pandey	SP	Vinod Singh	BSP
191	Kadipur (SC)	Ramchandra Chaudhary	SP	Bhagelu Ram	BSP
192	Kaimganj (SC)	Ajit Kumar	SP	Amar Singh	BJP
193	Amritpur	Narendra Singh Yadav	SP	Dr. Jitandra Singh Yadav	JaKP
194	Farrukhabad	Vijay Singh S/O Prem Singh	IND	Major Suneel Dutt Dwivedi	BJP
195	Bhojpur	Jamaluddin Siddiqui	SP	Mukesh Rajput	JaKP
196	Chhibramau	Arvind Singh Yadav	SP	Tahir Husain Siddiqui	BSP
197	Tirwa	Vyjai Bahadur Pal	SP	Kailash Singh Rajput	BSP
198	Kannauj (SC)	Anil Kumar Dohre	SP	Mahendra Nim Dohre	BSP
199	Jaswantnagar	Shivpal Singh Yadav	SP	Manish Yadav Pataray	BSP
200	Etawah	Raghuraj Singh Shakya	SP	Mahendra Singh Rajpoot	BSP
201	Bharthana (SC)	Sukh Devi Verma	SP	Raghvendra Kumar	BSP
202	Bidhuna	Pramod Kumar	SP	Devesh Kumar	BSP
203	Dibiyapur	Pradeep Kumar	SP	Ram Ji	BSP
204	Auraiya (SC)	Madan Singh Alias Santosh	SP	Kuldeep	BSP
205	Rasulabad (SC)	Shiv Kumar Beria	SP	Nirmala Sankhawar	BSP
206	Akbarpur - Raniya	Ramswaroop Singh	SP	Pratibha Shukla	BSP
207	Sikandra	Indrapal Singh	BSP	Devendra Singh Bhole	BJP
208	Bhognipur	Yogendra Pal Singh	SP	Dharm Pal Singh Bhadauriya	BSP
209	Bilhaur (SC)	Aruna Kumari Kori	SP	Kamlesh Chandra Divakar	BSP
210	Bithoor	Munindra Shukla	SP	Dr.Ram Prakash Kushwaha	BSP
211	Kalyanpur	Satish Kumar Nigam 'Advocate'	SP	Prem Lata Katiyar	BJP
212	Govindnagar	Satyadev Pachauri	BJP	Shailendra Dixit	INC
213	Sishamau	Haji Irfan Solanki	SP	Hanuman Swarup Mishra	BJP
214	Arya Nagar	Salil Vishnoi	BJP	Jitendra Bahadur Singh	SP
215	Kidwai Nagar	Ajay Kapoor	INC	Vivek Sheel Shukla (Beenu Shukla)	BJP
216	Kanpur Cantt	Raghunandan Singh Bhadauria	BJP	Mohd.Hasan Roomi	SP
217	Maharajpur	Satish Mahana	BJP	Shikha Mishra	BSP
218	Ghatampur (SC)	Indrajeet Kori	SP	Saroj Kureel	BSP
219	Madhaugarh	Santram	BSP	Keshvendra Singh	SP
220	Kalpi	Umakanti	INC	Sanjay Bhadauria Damras	BSP
221	Orai (SC)	Dayashankar	SP	Satyendra Pratap	BSP
222	Babina	Krishna Pal Singh Rajpoot	BSP	Chandrapal Singh Yadav	SP
223	Jhansi Nagar	Ravi Sharma	BJP	Sita Ram Kushwaha	BSP
224	Mauranipur (SC)	Dr. Rashmi Arya	SP	Rajendra Rahul Ahirwar	BSP
225	Garautha	Deepnarayan Singh (Deepak Yadav)	SP	Devesh Kumar Paliwal (Kukku Bhaiya)	BSP
226	Lalitpur	Ramesh Prasad Kushwaha	BSP	Chandra Bhusan Singh Bundela "guddu Raja"	SP
227	Mehroni (SC)	Feran Lal	BSP	Manohar Lal	BJP
228	Hamirpur	Sadhvi Niranjan Jyoti	BJP	Fateh Muhammad Khan	BSP
229	Rath (SC)	Gayadeen Anuragi	INC	Ambesh Kumari	SP
230	Mahoba	Rajnarain Alias Rajju	BSP	Siddhgopal Sahu	SP
231	Charkhari	Uma Bharti	BJP	Kaptan Singh	SP
232	Tindwari	Daljeet Singh	INC	Bishambhar Prasad	SP
233	Baberu	Vishambhar Singh	SP	Brij Mohan Singh	BSP
234	Naraini (SC)	Gayacharan Dinkar	BSP	Bharatlal Diwakar	SP
235	Banda	Vivek Kumar Singh	INC	Dinesh Chandra Shukla (Lala)	BSP
236	Chitrakoot	Veer Singh	SP	Ram Sevak	BSP
237	Manikpur	Chandrabhan Singh Patel	BSP	Shyamacharan Gupta	SP
238	Jahanabad	Madan Gopal Verma	SP	Sameer Trivedi	BSP
239	Bindki	Sukhadev Prasad Verma	BSP	Rajendra Singh Patel	BJP
240	Fatehpur	Shed Qasim Hasan	SP	Jeetendra Kumar Lodhi	BSP
241	Ayah Shah	Ayodhya Prasad Pal	BSP	Anand Prakash Lodhi	SP
242	Husainganj	Mo. Asif	BSP	Usha Devi Alias Anila Maurya	INC
243	Khaga (SC)	Krishna Paswan	BJP	Murli Dhar	BSP
244	Rampur Khas	Pramod Kumar	INC	Hiramani Patel	BSP
245	Babaganj (SC)	Vinod Kumar	IND	Mahendra Kumar	BSP
246	Kunda	Raghuraj Pratap Singh	IND	Shiv Prakash Mishra Senani	BSP
247	Bishwavnathganj	Raja Ram	SP	Sindhuja Mishra Senani	BSP
248	Pratapgarh	Nagendra Singh "munna Yadav"	SP	Sanjay	BSP
249	Patti	Ram Singh	SP	Rajendra Pratap Singh Urf Moti Singh	BJP
250	Raniganj	Pro. Shivakant Ojha	SP	Mansha Ahmad	BSP
251	Sirathu	Keshav Prasad	BJP	Anand Mohan	BSP
252	Manjhanpur (SC)	Indrajeet Saroj	BSP	Shiv Mohan Chaudhary	SP
253	Chail	Mohd Ashif Jafri	BSP	Chandra Bali	SP
254	Phaphamau	Ansar Ahmad	SP	Guru Prasad Maurya	BSP
255	Soraon (SC)	Satyaveer Munna	SP	Babu Lal 'Bhawara'	BSP
256	Phulpur	Sayeed Ahamad	SP	Praveen Patel	BSP
257	Pratappur	Vijma Yadav	SP	Mohd.Mujtaba Siddiqi	BSP
258	Handia	Maheshnarayan Singh	SP	Dr. Rakeshdhar Tripathi	PMSP
259	Meja	Girish Chandra Alias Gama Pandey	SP	Anand Kumar Alias Collector Pandey	BSP
260	Karachhana	Deepak Patel	BSP	Ujjwal Raman Singh	SP
261	Allahabad West	Pooja Pal	BSP	Atiq Ahamad	AD
262	Allahabad North	Anugrah Narayan Singh	INC	Harshvardhan Bajpayee	BSP
263	Allahabad South	Haji Parvej Ahmad (Tanki)	SP	Nand Gopal Gupta Nandi	BSP
264	Bara (SC)	Dr.Ajay Kumar	SP	Bholanath Chaudhary	BSP
265	Koraon (SC)	Rajbali Jaisal	BSP	Ramkripal	CPM
266	Kursi	Fareed Mahfooj Kidwai	SP	Kumari Meeta Gautam	BSP
267	Ram Nagar	Arvind Kumar Singh 'Gop'	SP	Amresh Kumar	BSP
268	Barabanki	Dharam Raj	SP	Sangram Singh	BSP
269	Zaidpur (SC)	Ramgopal	SP	Ved Prakash Rawat	BSP
270	Dariyabad	Rajeev Kumar Singh	SP	Vivekanand	BSP
271	Rudauli	Ram Chandra Yadav	BJP	Abbas Ali Zaidi Alias "rushdi Miyan"	SP
272	Haidergarh (SC)	Ram Magan	SP	Ram Narayan	BSP
273	Milkipur (SC)	Audhesh Prasad	SP	Pavan Kumar	BSP
274	Bikapur	Mitrasen Yadav	SP	Firoz Khan Urf Gabbar	BSP
275	Ayodhya	Tej Narayan Pandey Alias Pawan Pandey	SP	Lallu Singh	BJP
276	Goshainganj	Abhay Singh	SP	Indra Pratap Urf Khabbu Tiwari	BSP
277	Katehari	Shankh Lal Manjhi	SP	Lal Ji Verma	BSP
278	Tanda	Azimulhaque Pahlwan	SP	Ajay Kumar Alias Vishal Verma	BSP
279	Alapur (SC)	Bheem Prasad Sonkar	SP	Tribhuvan Dutt	BSP
280	Jalalpur	Sher Bahadur	SP	Ritesh Pandey	BSP
281	Akbarpur	Ram Murti Verma	SP	Sanjay Kumar	BSP
282	Balha (SC)	Savitri Bai Fule	BJP	Kiran Bharti	BSP
283	Nanpara	Madhuri Verma	INC	Waris Ali	BSP
284	Matera	Yasar Shah	SP	Ali Akbar	INC
285	Mahasi	Krishna Kumar Ojha	BSP	Sureshwar Singh	BJP
286	Bahraich	Dr. Waqar Ahmad Shah	SP	Chandra Shekhar Singh	INC
287	Payagpur	Mukesh Srivastva Alias Gyanendra Pratap	INC	Ajit Pratap Singh	BSP
288	Kaiserganj	Mukut Bihari	BJP	Ram Tej Yadav Advocate	SP
289	Bhinga	Indrani Devi	SP	Muhammad Aslam	INC
290	Shrawasti	Muhammad Ramjan	SP	Vinod Tripathi	BSP
291	Tulsipur	Abdul Mashhood Khan	SP	Salman Zaheer	BSP
292	Gainsari	Dr. Shiv Pratap Yadav	SP	Alauddin	BSP
293	Utraula	Arif Anwar Hashmi	SP	Dhirendra Pratap Singh	BSP
294	Balrampur (SC)	Jagram Paswan	SP	Ramapati Shastri	BJP
295	Mehnaun	Nandita Shukla	SP	Arshad Ali Khan	BSP
296	Gonda	Vinod Kumar Urf Pandit Singh	SP	Mahesh Narayan Tiwari	BJP
297	Katra Bazar	Bawan Singh	BJP	Masood Alam	BSP
298	Colonelganj	Yogesh Pratap Singh 'Yogesh Bhaiya'	SP	Ajay Pratap Singh Alias Lalla Bhaiya	BSP
299	Tarabganj	Awadhesh Kumar Singh Alias Manju Singh	SP	Ram Bhajan Chaube	BSP
300	Mankapur (SC)	Babulal	SP	Ramesh Chandra	BSP
301	Gaura	Kunwar Anand Singh	SP	Abdul Kalam Malik	INC
302	Shohratgarh	Lalmunni Singh	SP	Mumtaj Ahmad	BSP
303	Kapilvastu (SC)	Vijay Kumar	SP	Sri Ram Chauhan	BJP
304	Bansi	Jai Pratap Singh	BJP	Lal Ji	SP
305	Itwa	Mata Prasad Pandey	SP	Subodh Chandra	BSP
306	Doomariyaganj	Kamal Yusuf Malik	PECP	Saiyada Khatun	BSP
307	Harraiya	Rajkishor Singh	SP	Mamata Pandey	BSP
308	Kaptanganj	Ram Prasad Chaudhary	BSP	Trayambak Nath	SP
309	Rudhauli	Sanjay Pratap Jaiswal	INC	Rajendra Prasad Chaudhary	BSP
310	Basti Sadar	Jeetendra Kumar	BSP	Abhishek Pal	INC
311	Mahadewa (SC)	Ram Karan Arya	SP	Doodhram	BSP
312	Menhdawal	Laxmikant	SP	Anil Kumar	PECP
313	Khalilabad	Dr. Moh. Ayub	PECP	Mashhoor Alam	BSP
314	Dhanghata (SC)	Alagu Prasad Chauhan	SP	Ram Sidhare	BSP
315	Pharenda	Bajrang Bahadur Singh	BJP	Virendra Chaudhary	INC
316	Nautanwa	Kaushal Kishor	INC	Aman Mani Tripathi	SP
317	Siswa	Shivendra Singh Alias Shiv Babu	SP	Dr. Ramapati Ram Tripathi	BJP
318	Maharajganj (SC)	Sudama	SP	Nirmesh Mangal	BSP
319	Paniyara	Deo Narayan Urf G.M. Singh	BSP	Gyanendra	BJP
320	Caimpiyarganj	Fateh Bahadur	NCP	Chinta Yadav	SP
321	Pipraich	Rajmati	SP	Jitendra	BSP
322	Gorakhpur Urban	Dr Radha Mohan Das Agarwal	BJP	Raj Kumari Devi	SP
323	Gorakhpur Rural	Vijay Bahadur Yadava	BJP	Jafar Amin Dakku	SP
324	Sahajanwa	Rajendra	BSP	Aswani	BJP
325	Khajani (SC)	Sant Prasad	BJP	Ram Samujh	BSP
326	Chauri-Chaura	Jay Prakash	BSP	Anoop Kumar Pandey	SP
327	Bansgaon (SC)	Dr. Vijay Kumar	BSP	Sharda Devi	SP
328	Chillupar	Rajesh Tripathi	BSP	C.P Chand	SP
329	Khadda	Vijay Kumar Dubey	INC	N.P. Kushwaha	SP
330	Padrauna	Swami Prasad Maurya	BSP	Rajesh Kumar Jaiswal	INC
331	Tamkuhi Raj	Ajay Kumar 'Lalloo'	INC	Nand Kishor Mishra	BJP
332	Fazilnagar	Ganga	BJP	Kalamuddin	BSP
333	Kushinagar	Bramhashankar Tripathi	SP	Jawed Iqbal	BSP
334	Hata	Radheshyam	SP	Virendra	BSP
335	Ramkola (SC)	Purnmasi Dehati	SP	Deep Lal Bharti	BJP
336	Rudrapur	Akhilesh Pratap Singh	INC	Mukti Nath Yadav	SP
337	Deoria	Janmejai Singh	BJP	Pramod Singh	BSP
338	Pathardeva	Shakir Ali	SP	Surya Pratap Shahi	BJP
339	Rampur Karkhana	Choudhari Fasiha Bashir Alias Gajala Lari	SP	Girijesh Shahi Alias Guddu Shahi	IND
340	Bhatpar Rani	Kameshwar	SP	Sabhakunwar	BSP
341	Salempur (SC)	Manbodh	SP	Vijaylaxmi	BJP
342	Barhaj	Prem Prakash Singh	SP	Renu Jaiswal	BSP
343	Atrauliya	Dr.Sangram Yadav	SP	Surendra Prasad Mishra	BSP
344	Gopalpur	Waseem Ahmad	SP	Kamla Prasad Yadav	BSP
345	Sagri	Abhay Narayan	SP	Santosh Kumar Singh(Teepoo)	BSP
346	Mubarakpur	Shah Alam Urfa Guddu Jamali	BSP	Akhilesh Yadav	SP
347	Azamgarh	Durga Prasad Yadav	SP	Sarvesh Singh Sipu	BSP
348	Nizamabad	Alambadi	SP	Kalamuddin Khan	BSP
349	Phoolpur Pawai	Shyam Bahadur Singh Yadav	SP	Abul Kais Azami	BSP
350	Didarganj	Adil Sheikh	SP	Sukhdev Rajbhar	BSP
351	Lalganj (SC)	Bechai	SP	Hira Lal Gautam	BSP
352	Mehnagar (SC)	Brij Lal Sonkar	SP	Vidya Chaudhary	BSP
353	Madhuban	Umesh Pandey	BSP	Rajendra Mishra	SP
354	Ghosi	Sudhakar	SP	Fagu Chauhan	BSP
355	Muhammadabad- Gohna (SC)	Baijnath	SP	Rajendra	BSP
356	Mau	Mukhtar Ansari	QED	Bheem Rajbhar	BSP
357	Belthara Road (SC)	Gorakh Paswan	SP	Chhathu Ram	BSP
358	Rasara	Umashankar	BSP	Sanatan	SP
359	Sikanderpur	Jiauddin Rijvi	SP	Chandrabhushan Rajbhar	BSP
360	Phephana	Upendra Tiwari	BJP	Ambika Choudhary	SP
361	Ballia Nagar	Narad Rai	SP	Sathi Ramji Gupta	QED
362	Bansdih	Ram Govind	SP	Ketakee	BJP
363	Bairia	Jai Prakash Anchal	SP	Bharat	BJP
364	Badlapur	Om Prakash 'Baba' Dubey	SP	Lalji Yadav	BSP
365	Shahganj	Shailendra Yadav 'Lalaee'	SP	Dharmraj Nishad	BSP
366	Jaunpur	Nadeem Javed	INC	Tejbahadur Maurya 'Pappu'	BSP
367	Malhani	Paras Nath Yadaw	SP	Dr.Jagriti Singh	IND
368	Mungra Badshahpur	Seema	BJP	Ramesh	BSP
369	Machhlishahr (SC)	Jagdish Sonkar	SP	Rampher Gautam	BSP
370	Mariyahu	Shraddha Yadav	SP	Savitri Patel	BSP
371	Zafrabad	Sachindra Nath Tripathi	SP	Jagdish Narayan	BSP
372	Kerakat (SC)	Gulab Chand	SP	Vijay Lakshami	BSP
373	Jakhanian (SC)	Subba Ram	SP	Vijay Kumar	BSP
374	Saidpur (SC)	Subhash	SP	America	BSP
375	Ghazipur	Vijay Kumar Mishra	SP	Raj Kumar	BSP
376	Jangipur	Kailash	SP	Manish Chandra Pandey	BSP
377	Zahoorabad	Syeda Shadab Fatima	SP	Kalicharan	BSP
378	Mohammadabad	Sibgatulla Ansari	QED	Rajesh Rai	SP
379	Zamania	Omprakash	SP	Umashanker Kushwaha	BSP
380	Mughalsarai	Babban*	BSP	Babulal	SP
381	Sakaldiha	Sushil Singh	IND	Prabhunarayan Yadav	SP
382	Saiyadraja	Manoj Kumar	IND	Brijesh Singh Urf Arun Kumar Singh	PMSP
383	Chakia (SC)	Poonam	SP	Jitendra Kumar	BSP
384	Pindra	Ajay	INC	Jai Prakash	BSP
385	Ajagara (SC)	Tribhuvan Ram	BSP	Lalji	SP
386	Shivpur	Uday Lal Maurya	BSP	Dr.Piyush Yadav	SP
387	Rohaniya	Anupriya Patel	AD	Ramakant Singh	BSP
388	Varanasi North	Ravindra Jaiswal	BJP	Sujit Kumar Maurya	BSP
389	Varanasi South	Shyamdev Roy Chaudhari	BJP	Dr. Dayashankar Mishra "dayalu"	INC
390	Varanasi Cantt.	Jyotsana Srivastava	BJP	Anil Srivastwa	INC
391	Sevapuri	Surendra Singh Patel	SP	Neel Ratan Patel 'Neelu'	AD
392	Bhadohi	Jahid Beg	SP	Ravindranath Tripathi	BSP
393	Gyanpur	Vijay Kumar	SP	Dinesh Kumar Singh	BSP
394	Aurai (SC)	Madhubala	SP	Baijnath	BSP
395	Chhanbey (SC)	Bhai Lal Kol	SP	Shashi Bhushan	BSP
396	Mirzapur	Kailash Nath Chaurasiya	SP	Rang Nath Mishra	BSP
397	Majhawan	Ramesh Chand	BSP	Rajendra Prasad	SP
398	Chunar	Jagatamba Singh	SP	Ghanshyam	BSP
399	Marihan	Laliteshpati Tripathi	INC	Satyendra Kumar Patel	SP
400	Ghorawal	Ramesh Chandra	SP	Anil Kumar Maurya	BSP
401	Robertsganj	Avinash	SP	Ramesh Singh	BSP
402	Obra	Sunil Kumar	BSP	Devendra Prasad Shastri	BJP
403	Duddhi (SC)	Rubi Prasad	IND	Naresh Kumar	SP

Babban resigned on 8 October 2016.

== Analysis ==
Vote percentages party wise

The election was accompanied by high voting of 59.40%, with impressive women turnouts. The good performance of the SP getting a majority on its own showed that the people had voted for stability and it was largely attributed to the lengthy campaign by Akhilesh Yadav mainly on the issues of law and order and good administration. The promises made by the party in its manifesto also seemed to have swayed the voters towards them, however there were reports of violence from various places soon after the results started coming which had resulted the death of one boy. The Muslim-Yadav combined vote bank worked in favor of the SP since in more than 140 assembly constituencies the Muslim electorate played a role in victory of the candidates. The people seemed to have voted against the BSP on issues of corruption, abuse of public money and Mayawati's alleged image as being unapproachable. The result also showed that the parties SP and BSP had merely exchanged their vote percentage differences during this election and previous election. The defeat of the two national parties the Congress and the BJP was noted by the international media, even the two parties had performed well in 2009 general elections in the state. The reasons accounted of failure to offer as an alternative to the BSP, lack of chief ministerial candidate and proper leadership at the ground level. The lacklustre campaign headed by Rahul Gandhi and Uma Bharti also resulted to their losses. The election result had also put the campaigning style of Rahul Gandhi in question as he was in charge of the party and was earlier credited for party's victory in 2009 elections in the state. The defeat of the parties also showed their ill-preparedness for 2014 general elections with the rise of the regional parties. It also indicated that the central government headed by the Congress will be more at pressure from its allies, particularly the SP which is supporting the coalition at the center especially in cases of economic measures taken by the UPA government. The electorate seems to have partly rejected candidates with criminal backgrounds along with some from political families.

== See also ==
- Sixteenth Legislative Assembly of Uttar Pradesh
