= Ravi Sharma (Uttar Pradesh politician) =

Indian politician

Member of the Uttar Pradesh Legislative Assembly
- Incumbent
- Assumed office 2012
- Preceded by: Kailash Sahu
- Constituency: Jhansi Nagar

Personal details
- Born: November 11, 1971 (age 53); Jhansi, Jhansi district, Uttar Pradesh
- Political party: Bharatiya Janata Party
- Education: Bachelor of Commerce (BKD College)

Ravi Sharma (born 11 November 1971) is an Indian politician from Uttar Pradesh. He is a member of the Uttar Pradesh Legislative Assembly from Jhansi Nagar Assembly constituency in Jhansi district. He won the 2022 Uttar Pradesh Legislative Assembly election representing the Bharatiya Janata Party.

== Early life and education ==
Sharma was born in Jhansi, Jhansi district, Uttar Pradesh. He is the son of Satya Prakash Sharma. He married Sunita on 31 January 1990 and together they have a son and a daughter. He belongs to Brahmin community and resides in Jhansi. He completed his LLB in 1991 and earlier did his B.Com. in 1988 at BKD College, Bundelkhand University, Jhansi.

== Career ==
Sharma won from Jhansi Nagar Assembly constituency representing Bharatiya Janata Party in the 2022 Uttar Pradesh Legislative Assembly election. He polled 148,262 votes and defeated his nearest rival, Sitaram Kushwaha of the Samajwadi Party, by a margin of 76,353 votes. He first became an MLA winning the 2012 Uttar Pradesh Legislative Assembly election on BJP ticket and retained it in the 2017 Uttar Pradesh Legislative Assembly election. In 2022, he won for the third consecutive term.
