= Statements in response to the 11 July 2006 Mumbai train bombings =

Statements in response to the 11 July 2006 Mumbai train bombings came from heads of state, political leaders, and militant leaders from around the world. Most offered some sort of condemnation of the attacks and commented on terrorism as a whole.

== Indian statements ==
Various senior political figures condemned the attacks, including President Dr. A. P. J. Abdul Kalam, Prime Minister Dr. Manmohan Singh, Railways Minister Lalu Prasad Yadav, and president of the Indian National Congress Sonia Gandhi. L. K. Advani, president of the opposition Bharatiya Janata Party, also expressed shock, while saying that the UPA Government was soft on terrorists. The Party Chief of the BJP, Rajnath Singh also condemned the attacks saying, while targeting the government, that "Had POTA not been repealed by the UPA government, the terror groups would not have got encouraged," The Left Parties also condemned the attacks, calling for a thorough probe into the incident.

Prime Minister Manmohan Singh was quick to call for calm in Mumbai. In a televised address, he said:

No-one can make India kneel. The wheels of our economy will move on. India will continue to walk tall, and with confidence. Mumbai, stands tall once again as the symbol of a united India. An inclusive India. We will win this war against terror. Nothing will break our resolve.

— Prime Minister Manmohan Singh

Singh has received praise for his measured response.

== International statements ==
=== Africa ===
- South Africa: In a statement broadcast on the national SABC TV network, President Thabo Mbeki said he was confident that Indian authorities would track down the culprits and bring them to justice.

=== Asia ===
- Afghanistan: President Hamid Karzai said "Afghans have suffered at the hands of terrorists for many years and understand the pain and suffering that terrorism causes. My thoughts are with the families of the victims and those injured".
- Japan: Minister for Foreign Affairs Taro Aso expressed shock after hearing of the bombings in Mumbai, adding that they are "unjustified for whatever reason."
- Jordan: In a statement on July 12, King Abdullah II called the attacks "shameful criminal acts".
- Pakistan: President Pervez Musharraf, whose country has long feuded with India, condemned the blasts as "a despicable act of terrorism [that] has resulted in the loss of a large number of precious lives." Prime Minister Shaukat Aziz also issued a statement and said that "terrorism is a bane of our times and it must be condemned, rejected and countered effectively and comprehensively." Pakistan's Foreign Minister Khurshid Mahmud Kasuri suggested that the attacks could be linked to the failure to resolve the dispute over Kashmir, a suggestion the Indian foreign ministry rejected as "appalling", urging Pakistan to "take urgent steps to dismantle the infrastructure of terrorism on the territory under its control.".

=== Europe ===
- European Union: From Finland, which holds the organisation's rotating presidency, the European Union offered its sympathies stating that it is "important that those responsible for these barbarous acts of terrorism will be brought to justice. There can never be justification for such heinous attacks on innocent civilians."
- France: French President Jacques Chirac wrote a letter to Manmohan Singh on July 11 saying "I was shocked and outraged to learn of the terrible death toll of the terrorist attacks which hit several Indian trains and railway stations. France utterly condemns these acts which nothing can justify. In this ordeal, I want to express to you, and the Indian people, France's solidarity and my condolences. I also ask you to be kind enough to convey these, together with my profound sadness, to the bereaved".
- Germany: Chancellor Angela Merkel issued a statement on July 11 saying "The appalling news of a series of attacks in your country with many dead and injured greatly affected me. The Federal Government of Germany emphatically condemns these terrorist acts".
- Ireland: Minister for Foreign Affairs Dermot Ahern said "The bombings that took place in Mumbai today, which were clearly designed to spread maximum terror among people going about their daily lives, are to be utterly condemned. No cause or grievance can justify attacks such as these on innocent civilians. I wish to extend my sympathy to the people of Mumbai and of India, and to all those who have lost loved ones or suffered injury in these appalling acts of terrorism."
- Romania: The Romanian Ministry of Foreign Affairs condemned the attacks and stated that they "increase, in a dramatic way, the number of innocent people which have fallen victim to the inhuman and condemnable phenomenon of terrorism, which knowns no geographic, ethnic or religious limits." The Minister of Foreign Affairs, Mihai-Răzvan Ungureanu, also expressed Romania's solidarity with the Indian people and authorities, and his condolences to the affected families, while re-affirming his country's contribution to combating terrorism in all its forms.
- Russia: President Vladimir Putin said "There is no, and there can be no, justification for a crime of such cynicism and monstrosity. The terrorists guilty of this crime must be severely punished."
- Spain: Prime Minister José Luis Rodríguez Zapatero expressed his "profound sadness", saying Mumbai revived the horrors of a similar attack in Madrid two years ago.
- United Kingdom: Prime Minister Tony Blair issued the following statement: "I condemn utterly these brutal and shameful attacks. There can never be any justification for terrorism. Our thoughts are with the victims and their families. We stand united with India, as the world's largest democracy who share our values and determination to defeat terrorism in all its forms."
- Pope Benedict XVI sent a message through Cardinal Secretary of State Angelo Sodano stating that he was, "deeply saddened by the news of the terrorist attacks in Bombay." He went on to note that he, "assures all affected of his spiritual closeness in prayer." Cardinal Sodano also wrote, "While deploring these senseless acts against humanity, the Holy Father commends the many deceased to the loving mercy of the Almighty. Upon their grieving families and the numerous injured he invokes the divine gifts of strength, consolation and comfort."

=== North America ===
- Canada: Minister of Foreign Affairs Peter MacKay described the bombings as "a deplorable act of violence against innocent civilians." and stated that "Canada stands with India in condemning these acts of terror perpetrated by those who value human life less than their own extreme beliefs."
- Mexico: "The Mexican government through its ministry of foreign affairs expresses its strong condemnation of the attacks of July 11th in the city of Mumbai where more than a hundred people lost their lives and several were injured,' a press release issued by the Mexican foreign ministry said. "The Mexican government condemns once again the use of violence and any kind of terrorist acts, and expresses its complete solidarity with the relatives of the victims, and with the people and the government of India for this terrible event".
- United States: President George W. Bush issued a statement saying "the United States stands with the people and government of India". The State Department issued a statement stating that they "condemn these attacks in the strongest possible terms", calling them "senseless acts of violence designed to strike at those innocent people who were just going about their daily lives".

=== Oceania ===
- Australia: Australian Foreign Minister Alexander Downer said "This senseless slaughter of innocent civilians reinforces the continuing importance of strong international resolve to confront the threat posed by terrorism wherever it threatens our communities." The Prime Minister John Howard also released a statement: "It is a reminder because it has occurred in India, it's a reminder that no country is immune from the possibility of terrorist attacks."

=== South America ===
- Venezuela: A document issued by the Venezuelan foreign ministry stated: "We have received the terrible news of this tragedy that today brings mourning to hundreds of families of Indian and other nationalities. The Venezuelan government and people call for peace and calm to return to the noble people of Gandhi".

=== World organizations ===
- Commonwealth of Nations: Secretary-General Don McKinnon issued a statement saying, ""These dreadful events once again remind us that the international community needs to stand together and remain resolute in fighting terrorism in all its forms and manifestations, wherever it exists. Let me assure you of the Commonwealth’s shared sense of concern and unwavering solidarity with you and your government at this time. May I also convey the heartfelt condolences of all Commonwealth governments and myself personally to all those who have been injured, bereaved or otherwise affected by yesterday’s events."
- United Nations: Secretary-General Kofi Annan "The bombings in Mumbai and the grenade attacks in Srinagar increase the urgency of coordinated action by all countries to defeat terrorism in all its forms and manifestations, committed by whomever, whenever, wherever and for whatever purpose."

== Statements from militant groups ==
The Lashkar-e-Toiba and Hizb-ul-Mujahideen militant groups have condemned the blasts and rejected suggestions that they are behind the attacks. A spokesman for the Lashkar-e-Toiba group described the bombings as "inhuman" and "barbaric". It should, however be noted that these groups have reduced direct attacks on the establishment of late and have started providing intelligence and arms to splinter groups and sympathetic organisations like SIMI to carry out similar deadly attacks.

A spokesman of Al Qaeda told CNS that the Al Qaeda Jammu and Kashmir chief Abu Abdur Rahman Ansari has "expressed happiness over the Mumbai serial blasts and appreciated those who carried out these attacks." He further stated that Al Qaeda had established itself in Jammu and Kashmir.
