= Govind Das Richharia =

Indian politician (1920–1996)

Member of Parliament
- In office 1971–1977
- Preceded by: Sushila Nayyar
- Succeeded by: Sushila Nayyar
- Constituency: Jhansi (Lok Sabha constituency)

Personal details
- Born: 26 February 1920; Barasagar, Jhansi district, India
- Died: 18 March 1996 (aged 76); Jhansi district, India
- Political party: Indian National Congress
- Children: 3 Son & 1 Daughter
- Parent: Ghanshyam Dass Richhariya (Father)
- Education: Ayurved Vishard (B.M.S.A.)
- Occupation: Politician

Govind Das Richharia (26 February 1920 – 18 March 1996) was an Indian politician who was a leader of Indian National Congress. He was member of the Fifth Lok Sabha representing the Jhansi of Uttar Pradesh. He also served as a member of the Uttar Pradesh Vidhan Sabha from 1980 to 1985.

Richharia died on 18 March 1996, at the age of 76.
