= Krishna Pal Singh Rajpoot =

Indian politician (born 1970)

Member of the Uttar Pradesh Legislative Assembly
- In office 2012–2017
- Preceded by: Ratan Lal Ahirwar
- Succeeded by: Rajeev Singh Parichha
- Constituency: Babina

Personal details
- Born: 9 January 1970 (age 56) Pulgahna, Jhansi district, Uttar Pradesh
- Party: Bahujan Samaj Party
- Spouse: Lali Devi Rajput (m. 1988)
- Children: 1 son( Mukesh Rajpoot)
- Parent: Balak Das Rajpoot (father)
- Education: Intermediate

Krishna Pal Singh Rajpoot is an Indian politician from Uttar Pradesh who served as Member of 16th Uttar Pradesh Assembly from Babina Assembly constituency.

== Personal life ==
He was born on 9 January 1970 to Balak Das Rajpoot in Pulgahna, Jhansi district. He has completed up to intermediate education. He married Lali Devi Rajput on 2 July 1988 and has two sons.

== Career ==
In 2012 Uttar Pradesh Legislative Assembly election, he defeated Chandrapal Singh Yadav with 68,144 votes and the margin of 6,955 votes. In 2017 Uttar Pradesh Legislative Assembly election, he lost the election and ended at third position with 42,614 votes.
