= Mauranipur Assembly constituency =

Constituency of the Uttar Pradesh legislative assembly in India

Coordinates: 25.25°N 79.14°E

Mauranipur
- Constituency No. 224 for the Uttar Pradesh Legislative Assembly

Constituency details
- Country: India
- Region: North India
- State: Uttar Pradesh
- Division: Jhansi division
- District: Jhansi
- Total electors: 4,13,770
- Reservation: SC

Member of Legislative Assembly
- 18th Uttar Pradesh Legislative Assembly
- Incumbent Rashmi Arya
- Party: AD(S)
- Alliance: NDA
- Elected year: 2022

Mauranipur is a constituency of the Uttar Pradesh Legislative Assembly covering the city of Mauranipur in the Jhansi district of Uttar Pradesh, India.

Mauranipur is one of five assembly constituencies in the Jhansi Lok Sabha constituency. Since 2008, this assembly constituency is numbered 224 amongst 403 constituencies. As of 2022, the constituency is represented by Rashmi Arya of the Apna Dal (Sonelal) party.

== Members of the Legislative Assembly ==
Year	Member	Party
1967	Beni Bai	Indian National Congress
1969	Premnarain Ahirwar	Bharatiya Jana Sangh
1974	Rashmi Arya	Indian National Congress
1977	Rashmi Arya	Janata Party
1980	Rashmi Arya	Indian National Congress (I)
1985	Rashmi Arya	Indian National Congress
1989	Rashmi Arya	Bharatiya Janata Party
1991	Rashmi Arya	Bharatiya Janata Party
1993	Rashmi Arya	Indian National Congress
1996	Rashmi Arya	Indian National Congress
2002	Rashmi Arya	Bharatiya Janata Party
2007	Rashmi Arya	Bahujan Samaj Party
2012	Rashmi Arya	Samajwadi Party
2017	Bihari Lal Arya	Bharatiya Janata Party
2022	Rashmi Arya	Apna Dal (Soneylal)

== Election results ==
=== 2027 ===
2027 Uttar Pradesh Legislative Assembly election: Mauranipur
Party	Candidate	Votes	%	±%
INDIA				
NDA				
BSP				
NOTA	None of the above			
Majority				
Turnout				
gain from		Swing		

=== 2022 ===
2022 Uttar Pradesh Legislative Assembly election: Mauranipur
Party	Candidate	Votes	%	±%
AD(S)	Rashmi Arya	143,577	51.83	
SP	Tilak Chandra Ahirwar	84,982	30.68	+0.2
BSP	Rohit Ratan	32,641	11.78	−17.21
INC	Bhagwan Das Kori	3,323	1.2	
Independent	Jitendra Kumar	2,653	0.96	
NOTA	None of the above	3,471	1.25	−0.08
Majority		58,595	21.15	+14.83
Turnout		276,999	66.95	+0.1
AD(S) gain from BJP		Swing		

=== 2017 ===
2017 Uttar Pradesh Legislative Assembly Election: Mauranipur
Party	Candidate	Votes	%	±%
BJP	Bihari Lal Arya	98,905	36.8	
SP	Rashmi Arya	81,934	30.48	
BSP	Pragee lal Ahirwar	77,919	28.99	
NOTA	None of the above	3,536	1.33	
Majority		16,971	6.32	
Turnout		268,783	66.85	
