= Rajendra Agnihotri =

Indian politician

Member of parliament
- In office 1989–1999
- Preceded by: Sujan Singh Bundela
- Succeeded by: Sujan Singh Bundela
- Constituency: Jhansi

Personal details
- Born: 1 January 1938 Jhansi, United Provinces, British India
- Died: 5 June 2008 (aged 70) Jhansi, Uttar Pradesh, India
- Party: Bharatiya Janata Party
- Spouse: Saroj
- Children: Ashish Agnihotri, Neelam (yojana) Agnihotri
- Parent: Balaram Agnihotri(Father)
- Education: Lucknow University
- Occupation: Politician

Rajendra Agnihotri (1938- 2008) was a leader of Bharatiya Janata Party. He was a member of the Ninth, Tenth, Eleventh, and Twelfth Lok Sabha representing the Jhansi of Uttar Pradesh. From 1963 to 1985, he worked as Pracharak of Rashtriya Swayamsevak Sangh. He also served as a member of the Uttar Pradesh Vidhan Sabha from 1980 to 1985 from Jhansi Nagar and was Chief Whip for Bharatiya Janata Party in Uttar Pradesh Legislative Assembly. He died on 5 June 2008.
