= Rashmi Arya =

Indian politician

Rashmi Jayprakash Arya

Member of the Uttar Pradesh Legislative Assembly
- Incumbent
- Assumed office 2022
- Preceded by: Bihari Lal Arya
- Constituency: Mauranipur

Personal details
- Citizenship: Indian
- Party: Apna Dal (S)
- Other political affiliations: Samajwadi Party, Bhartiya Janata Party
- Spouse: Jay Prakashji Arya
- Occupation: Politician
- Profession: Social Worker

Rashmi Jayprakash Arya is an Indian politician from Uttar Pradesh. She won as a Member of Legislative Assembly for Mauranipur Assembly Constituency in 2022.

== Early life ==
Arya belongs to the Koli caste of Uttar Pradesh. She hails from Ghatampur, a constituency reserved for SC community members.

== Career ==
Arya won the 2022 Uttar Pradesh legislative assembly election as a representative of Apna Dal (S), which is an alliance partner of the Bharatiya Janata Party. She defeated the Samajwadi party candidate. Later, she joined BJP. Tilakchandra Ahirwar by a margin of 58,595 votes. Previously in 2012, she was a member of Samajwadi party and won 2012 Uttar Pradesh Legislative Assembly election by defeating the Bahujan Samaj Party candidate.
