= Manohar Lal Panth =

Indian politician

Minister of State (Independent charge), Uttar Pradesh Government
- Incumbent
- Assumed office 22 March 2017
- Chief Minister: Yogi Adityanath

Member of the Uttar Pradesh Legislative Assembly
- Incumbent
- Assumed office March 2017
- Preceded by: Feran Lal
- Constituency: Mehroni

Personal details
- Born: 30 September 1954 (age 72) Mahroni, Lalitpur, District, Uttar Pradesh, India
- Party: Bharatiya Janata Party
- Spouse: Kasturi Devi (m. 1968)
- Children: 5
- Parent: Harju Prasad (father)
- Education: Highschool
- Profession: Agriculture
- Source

Manohar Lal Panth, also known as Mannu Kori, is politician in the Indian state of Uttar Pradesh. He was elected to the state's legislative assembly from the Mehroni assembly constituency in 2017, and was reelected in 2022. He was selected as the state minister of labour and employment exchanges by Chief Minister Yogi Adityanath in March 2017.

== See also ==
- Yogi Adityanath ministry (2017–)
