= Babina Assembly constituency =

Constituency of the Uttar Pradesh legislative assembly in India

Coordinates: 25.25°N 78.46°E

Babina
- Constituency No. 222 for the Uttar Pradesh Legislative Assembly

Constituency details
- Country: India
- Region: North India
- State: Uttar Pradesh
- District: Jhansi
- Total electors: 3,22,721
- Reservation: None

Member of Legislative Assembly
- 18th Uttar Pradesh Legislative Assembly
- Incumbent Rajeev Singh Parichha
- Party: Bharatiya Janta Party
- Elected year: 2017

Babina is a constituency of the Uttar Pradesh Legislative Assembly covering the city of Babina in the Jhansi district of Uttar Pradesh, India. Babina is one of five assembly constituencies in the Jhansi Lok Sabha constituency. Since 2008, this assembly constituency has numbered 222 amongst 403 constituencies.

Currently, this seat belongs to Bharatiya Janta Party candidate Rajeev Singh Parichha who won in the last Assembly election of 2022 Uttar Pradesh Legislative Elections defeating Samajwadi Party candidate Yashpal Singh Yadav by a margin of 44,529 votes.

== Members of Legislative Assembly ==
Year	Member	Party
1967	Sudama Prasad	Indian National Congress
1969	Sudama Prasad	Indian National Congress
1974	Bhagwat Dayal	Bharatiya Jana Sangh
1977	Bhagwat Dayal	Janata Party
1980	Beni Bai	Indian National Congress (Indira)
1985	Beni Bai	Indian National Congress
1989	Ratan Lal Ahirwar	Bharatiya Janata Party
1991	Ratan Lal Ahirwar	Bharatiya Janata Party
1993	Ratan Lal Ahirwar	Bharatiya Janata Party
1996	Satish Jatariya	Bahujan Samaj Party
2002	Ratan Lal Ahirwar	Samajwadi Party
2007	Ratan Lal Ahirwar	Bahujan Samaj Party
2012	Krishna Pal Singh Rajpoot	Bahujan Samaj Party
2017	Rajeev Singh Parichha	Bharatiya Janata Party
2022	Rajeev Singh Parichha	Bharatiya Janata Party

== Results ==
=== 2027 ===
2027 Uttar Pradesh Legislative Assembly election: Babina
Party	Candidate	Votes	%	±%
INDIA				
NDA				
BSP				
NOTA	None of the above			
Majority				
Turnout				
gain from		Swing		

=== 2022 ===
2022 Uttar Pradesh Legislative Assembly election: Babina
Party	Candidate	Votes	%	±%
BJP	Rajeev Singh Parichha	118,343	50.44	+8.42
SP	Yashpal Singh Yadav	73,814	31.46	−3.24
BSP	Dasharath Singh Rajpoot	30,540	13.02	−5.49
Jan Adhikar Party	Rani Devi	2,655	1.13	
INC	Chandra Shekher Tiwari	2,332	0.99	
NOTA	None of the above	1,835	0.78	−0.09
Majority		44,529	18.98	+11.66
Turnout		234,631	70.73	−0.43
BJP hold		Swing		

=== 2017 ===
2017 Uttar Pradesh Legislative Assembly election: Babina
Party	Candidate	Votes	%	±%
BJP	Rajeev Singh Parichha	96,713	42.02	
SP	Yashpal Singh Yadav	79,876	34.7	
BSP	Krishna Pal Singh Rajpoot	42,614	18.51	
Jan Adhikar Manch	Kalicharan Kushwaha	3,282	1.43	
NOTA	None of the above	1,982	0.87	
Majority		16,837	7.32	
Turnout		230,162	71.16	
