= Sujan Singh Bundela =

Indian politician (1946–2023)

Member of Parliament, Lok Sabha
- In office 1999–2004
- Preceded by: Rajendra Agnihotri
- Succeeded by: Chandrapal Singh Yadav
- In office 1984–1989
- Preceded by: Vishwanath Sharma
- Succeeded by: Rajendra Agnihotri
- Constituency: Jhansi, Uttar Pradesh

Personal details
- Born: 1 June 1946 Lalitpur, United Provinces, British India (present-day Uttar Pradesh, India)
- Died: 30 March 2023 (aged 76)
- Party: Indian National Congress
- Spouse: Baby Raja
- Children: 5 including Chandrabhushan Singh Bundela
- Parent(s): Thakur Udal Singh Bundela, Prem Kunwar
- Relatives: Puran Singh Bundela, Virendra Singh Bundela

Sujan Singh Bundela (1 June 1946 – 30 March 2023) was an Indian politician. He was elected to the Lok Sabha, the lower house of the Parliament of India from Jhansi, Uttar Pradesh as a member of the Indian National Congress. He died on 30 March 2023 after a prolonged illness in his residence at Lalitpur (UP) on the eve of Ramnavami.

Bundela died on 30 March 2023, at the age of 76.
