= Vishwanath Sharma =

Indian politician

Member of Parliament, Lok Sabha
- In office 1980-1984
- Preceded by: Sushila Nayyar
- Succeeded by: Sujan Singh Bundela
- Constituency: Jhansi, Uttar Pradesh
- In office 1991-1996
- Preceded by: Ganga Charan Rajput
- Succeeded by: Ganga Charan Rajput
- Constituency: Hamirpur, Uttar Pradesh

Personal details
- Born: October 19, 1939 Kansli, Jaipur district, Rajasthan, British India
- Died: November 20, 2017 (aged 78) Jhansi
- Party: Bharatiya Janata Party
- Other political affiliations: Indian National Congress
- Spouse: Geeta Sharma

Vishwanath Sharma (19 October 1939 - 20 November 2017) was an Indian politician. He was elected to the Lok Sabha, the lower house of the Parliament of India from Jhansi in 1980 and Hamirpur in 1991.
