= Kasturba Health Society =

- Abbreviation: KHS
- Formation: September 11, 1962; 64 years ago
- Location: Sevagram

The Kasturba Health Society was formed on September 11, 1962 to run the Kasturba Hospital

It now runs the Mahatma Gandhi Institute of Medical Sciences and the Kasturba Hospital
