= Uma Bharti ministry =

Government of Madhya Pradesh, India (2003–2004)

- Ministry of Madhya Pradesh
- no
- Date formed: 8 December 2003
- Date dissolved: 22 August 2004

People and organisations
- Chief Minister: Uma Bharti
- Member parties: Bharatiya Janata Party

History
- Predecessor: Digvijaya Singh
- Successor: Babulal Gaur

The Uma Bharti ministry was the Council of Ministers in Madhya Pradesh headed by Uma Bharti of the Bharatiya Janata Party. Bharti served as the 15th Chief Minister of Madhya Pradesh from 8 December 2003 to 22 August 2004. She was preceded by Digvijaya Singh and succeeded by Babulal Gaur.

== Council of Ministers ==
| Name | Office | Portfolio | Took office | Left office |
|---|---|---|---|---|
| Uma Bharti | Chief Minister | | 8 December 2003 | 22 August 2004 |
| Babulal Gaur | Cabinet Minister | | 8 December 2003 | 22 August 2004 |
| Gauri Shankar Shejwar | Cabinet Minister | | 8 December 2003 | 22 August 2004 |
| Kailash Chawla | Cabinet Minister | | 8 December 2003 | 22 August 2004 |
| Raghavji | Cabinet Minister | | 8 December 2003 | 22 August 2004 |
| Dhal Singh Bisen | Cabinet Minister | | 8 December 2003 | 22 August 2004 |
| Gopal Bhargava | Cabinet Minister | | 8 December 2003 | 22 August 2004 |
| Kailash Vijayvargiya | Cabinet Minister | | 8 December 2003 | 22 August 2004 |
| Choudhury Chandrabhan Singh | Cabinet Minister | | 8 December 2003 | 22 August 2004 |
| Narendra Singh Tomar | Cabinet Minister | | 8 December 2003 | 22 August 2004 |
| Harnam Singh Rathore | Cabinet Minister | | 8 December 2003 | 22 August 2004 |
| Ramakant Tiwari | Cabinet Minister | | 8 December 2003 | 22 August 2004 |
| Om Prakash Dhurve | Cabinet Minister | | 8 December 2003 | 22 August 2004 |
| Anoop Mishra | Minister of State | | 8 December 2003 | 22 August 2004 |
| Meena Singh | Minister of State | | 8 December 2003 | 22 August 2004 |
| Jagdish Mubel | Minister of State | | 8 December 2003 | 22 August 2004 |
| Badrilal Yadav | Minister of State | | 8 December 2003 | 22 August 2004 |
| Alka Jain | Minister of State | | 8 December 2003 | 22 August 2004 |

== See also ==
- Government of Madhya Pradesh
- Madhya Pradesh Legislative Assembly
