= Pyarelal Nayyar =

Personal secretary of Mahatma Gandhi (1899–1982)

Pyarelal Nayyar (1899–1982) was the personal secretary of Mahatma Gandhi in his later years. His sister Sushila Nayyar was the personal physician to Mahatma Gandhi.

He received his B.A. from University of Punjab and quit his M.A. studies during the Non-cooperation movement of 1920.

== Freedom Struggle ==
Pyarelal was active in the freedom struggle, in the footsteps of Gandhi. He participated in the Salt March to Dandi in 1930.

Pyarelal was portrayed by Pankaj Kapur in the Richard Attenborough film Gandhi (1982). Then personal secretary to Pyarelal, Dewan Vasdev Khanna (1923–2010), played a key role with Richard Attenborough in completing a script for film "Gandhi", which attained world fame.

== Post Gandhi ==
Nayyar continued his literary work on Gandhi until his last days. Nayyar held privately a large cache of personal papers that belonged to Gandhi which were only brought into public domain only in 2007.

== Writings ==
He has biographical books on Mahatma Gandhi, on which he was assisted by Dewan Vasdev Khanna (1923–2010). Dewan Vasdev Khanna assisted Pyarelal Nayyar till 1980, before moving to United States of America. Following is a partial list:

1. The Early Phase, (Vol. I)
2. Mahatma Gandhi: The Discovery of Satyagraha – On the Threshold, (Vol. II)
3. Mahatma Gandhi: The Birth of Satyagraha, (Vol. III)
4. Mahatma Gandhi: Satyagraha at Work, (Vol. IV)
5. Mahatma Gandhi: India Awakened, (Vol. V)
6. Mahatma Gandhi: Salt Satyagraha – The Watershed, (Vol. VI)
7. Mahatma Gandhi: Preparing For Swaraj, (Vol. VII)
8. Mahatma Gandhi: Final Fight For Freedom, (Vol. VIII)
9. Mahatma Gandhi: The Last Phase, (Vol. IX)
10. Mahatma Gandhi: The Last Phase, (Vol. X)

Note: Vol. IV to VII were completed by Sushila Nayyar.
