= Pradeep Jain Aditya =

Indian politician (born 1962)

Pradeep Kumar Jain Aditya
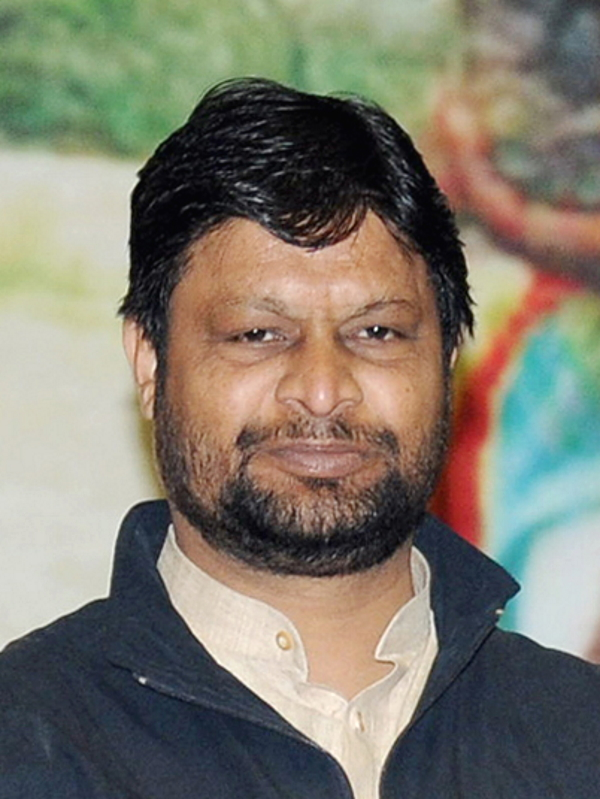

Union Minister of State for Rural Development
- In office 28 May 2009 – 26 May 2014
- Preceded by: Chandra Sekhar Sahu
- Succeeded by: Upendra Kushwaha

Member of parliament, Lok Sabha
- In office May 2009 – May 2014
- Preceded by: Chandrapal Singh Yadav
- Succeeded by: Uma Bharti
- Constituency: Jhansi

Personal details
- Born: 8 September 1962 (age 64) Jhansi, Uttar Pradesh, India
- Party: Indian National Congress
- Spouse: Snehalata Jain
- Education: M.A., M.Com., L.L.B.
- Occupation: Politician
- As of August, 2021

Pradeep Kumar Jain Aditya (born 8 September 1962), is an Indian politician from Indian National Congress (INC), who was Minister of State in Ministry of Rural Development in the 2009 Union Cabinet.

He was elected as a Member of Parliament in 2009 Indian general election and had represented the Jhansi constituency in 15th Lok Sabha.

== Early life and education ==
He was born on 8 September 1962 in Jhansi, Uttar Pradesh to Vishnu Kumar Jain and Shanti Devi Jain.

His educational qualifications include degrees of M.A., M.Com., and L.L.B. from Bundelkhand University. He is an advocate by profession.

== Career ==
Pradeep was elected as a member of Uttar Pradesh Vidhan Sabha from Jhansi constituency twice, first in 2004 By-election by defeating the heavy-weight BJP politician and former Cabinet Minister of U.P. Ravindra Shukla and then again in 2007 by defeating Industrialist and the owner of Baidyanath Pharmaceutical Co. by a record margin of 26.6% . In 2009, he was elected to 15th Lok Sabha from Jhansi in the Indian general election of 2009 and thereafter became Union Minister of State, for Rural Development, and his inclusion in the ministry was seen as an indication of renewed importance given to Bundelkhand politics by the Congress party.

Pradeep is credited with installing statue of hockey legend from Jhansi, Dhyan Chand in the city. Pradeep wrote the letter with signatures of 81 MP's to then PM on 21 December 2011 for considering Bharat Ratna for Dhyan Chand. However Sachin Tendulkar and C.N. Rao were selected for the award.

Pradeep Jain contested Jhansi lok sabha seat in 2014 Indian general election but lost the seat to Uma Bharti of the BJP.

== Personal life ==
On 5 May 1992, Pradeep Kumar Jain Aditya married Snehalata Jain, and the couple has two children. His son, Gaurav Jain, is an advocate who practices in the Supreme Court and represents the Indian National Congress on TV debates. He has also been associated with the Indian Youth Congress in various roles. His daughter, Somya, is an artist and works with an NGO focusing on art therapy for children..
