= Rajeev Singh Parichha =

Member of the Uttar Pradesh Legislative Assembly

Member of Uttar Pradesh Legislative Assembly
- Incumbent
- Assumed office March 2017
- Preceded by: Krishna Pal Singh Rajpoot
- Constituency: Babina

Personal details
- Born: 10 January 1976 (age 50) Jhansi, Uttar Pradesh
- Party: Bharatiya Janata Party
- Profession: Politician

Rajeev Singh Parichha is an Indian politician and a member of the 18th Uttar Pradesh Assembly from the Babina Assembly constituency of the Jhansi district. He is a member of the Bharatiya Janata Party.

== Early life ==
Rajeev Singh Parichha was born on 10 January 1976 in Jhansi, Uttar Pradesh, to a Hindu jadon rajput family of Kailash Singh. He married Kamli Singh, and they had three children.

== Positions held ==
#	From	To	Position	Ref
01	March 2017	March 2022	Member, 17th Uttar Pradesh Assembly	
02	March 2022	Incumbent	Member, 18th Uttar Pradesh Assembly	

== Controversy ==
In June 2025, while travelling on the New Delhi–Bhopal Vande Bharat Express, Parichha reportedly asked a fellow passenger, Raj Prakash, to exchange seats so that Parichha could occupy the window seat for his family; Prakash refused the request. According to eyewitnesses, when the train reached Jhansi station, a group of around 15–20 men, alleged to be Parichha’s aides, boarded the coach and assaulted Prakash, leaving him bleeding from the nose, ears and mouth and with a fractured nose.

Parichha subsequently filed a non-cognisable report (NCR) with the Government Railway Police at Jhansi, alleging that Prakash had used abusive language and behaved indecently; no FIR has been registered as of 22 June 2025, pending either a formal complaint by the victim or a court order, and authorities have announced that CCTV footage from both the train and station will be examined as part of the probe.

In response, the BJP issued a show-cause notice to Parichha on June 23, 2025, seeking an explanation for the incident after the CCTV footage surfaced.
