= Anurag Sharma (politician) =

Indian politician

Member of Parliament, Lok Sabha
- Incumbent
- Assumed office 23 May 2019
- Preceded by: Uma Bharati
- Constituency: Jhansi

Personal details
- Born: 16 November 1964 (age 61) Jhansi, Uttar Pradesh, India
- Party: Bharatiya Janata Party
- Spouse: Poonam Sharma (January 1990)
- Children: 2 Daughters
- Parent(s): Vishwanath Sharma, Geeta Sharma
- Occupation: politician

Anurag Sharma (born 16 November 1964) is a Bharatiya Janata Party politician and two time Member of Parliament in Lok Sabha from Jhansi-Lalitpur constituency of Uttar Pradesh having contested and won in both 2019 & 2024.

In the 2024 Lok Sabha Election Anurag Sharma won with 6,90,316 votes. He defeated Pradeep Jain Aditya of Indian National Congress by 1,02,614 votes. Anurag Sharma is also the Managing Director of Shree Baidyanath Ayurved Bhawan and the Chairman of Rani Laxmi Bai group of Public Schools
