= Mahatma Gandhi Institute of Medical Sciences =

College in Sevagram, Maharashtra, India

- MGIMS logo
- Motto: सत्य- धर्मं - प्रेम
- Type: Education and research institution
- Established: 1969; 57 years ago
- Affiliations: Maharashtra University of Health Sciences
- Endowment: Government of India (50%), Government of Maharashtra (25%), Kasturba Health Society (25%)
- President: Mr PL Tapdiya
- Dean: Dr AK Shukla
- Undergraduates: 100 per year (MBBS)
- Location: Sevagram, Maharashtra, India; 20.739369°N 78.660699°E
- Website: www.mgims.ac.in

The Mahatma Gandhi Institute of Medical Sciences (MGIMS) is India's first rural medical college, located in Sevagram, Maharashtra, India. It is managed by the Kasturba Health Society. The college was earlier affiliated to the Nagpur University (1969–1997) and from year 1998 it is now affiliated to the Maharashtra University of Health Sciences (MUHS), Nashik.

== Location ==
The institute is located in Sevagram, a small village about 8 km from the city of Wardha. It is well connected with other parts of the country by rail and road links. Dr. Babasaheb Ambedkar International Airport at Nagpur is about 70 km away from the institute.

== History ==
The MGIMS was begun in 1969, the Gandhi centenary year. It is the first rural medical college in India. It was started by Dr Sushila Nayyar. The Kasturba Hospital, started in 1944, is the only hospital started by the father of the nation himself.

== Academics ==
The courses offered by the institute are

- M.B.B.S. (annual intake of 100 students)
- M.D./M.S.
- Diploma courses in Medicine and Surgery

== Admissions ==
The institute enrolls 100 students every year. Half are from the state of Maharashtra and the other half come from the rest of India. Earlier the institute was having special reservations for students from rural areas of the count and the institute was having its own premedical test (PMT) examination, which includes a multiple choice question test on physics, chemistry and biology and a special theory paper on Gandhian thoughts. The students are selected on the basis of the marks obtained in these exams. But since 2017 institute admitting the students from NEET-UG & NEET-PG ( National Eligibility cum Entrance Test )

=== Postgraduate courses ===
The institute offers postgraduate training in almost all important disciplines of medical science. Admission to these courses is based on performance of a student in NEET PG exam.

== Medical services ==
=== Kasturba Hospital ===
The Kasturba Hospital was started in 1945 by Sushila Nayar, close associate of Gandhi and his personal physician. From 770 bed hospital, Kasturba Hospital at Sevagram has now grown into a nearly 1000- bed teaching hospital located in Sevagram, about 8 km from Wardha town, and offers tertiary care healthcare facilities to rural patients.

Over a 24-hour period, close to 1700 patients access outpatient care in the hospital, hospital pharmacies deal with 1800 prescriptions, 140 patients seek admission to the hospital wards, 14 patients undergo major surgeries, 12 babies are delivered, and 20 units of blood are transfused. In addition, 270 patients undergo radiography, 65 ultrasound examinations, 14 computed tomography, and seven patients have a magnetic resonance imaging scan. The laboratories report 750 biochemical tests, 510 complete blood counts, 100 serologic tests, 20 cytology samples and 15 biopsy specimens.

== Research ==
Facility- as well as community-based research is conducted in areas like maternal, neonatal, and child health care, infectious diseases, nutritional illnesses, lifestyle and disorders.

To explore traditional systems of Indian medicine.

=== Lead center for State Level Monitoring of ICDS ===
The Department of Community Medicine has been designated the lead center for State Level Monitoring of ICDS activities in Maharashtra. Dr BS Garg, Dr Subodh S Gupta and Dr PR Deshmukh have been appointed State ICDS Consultants. They monitored the activities of ICDS in six districts of Maharashtra during the year 2008–09; viz. Wardha, Yavatmal, Amravati, Chandrapur, Akola, and Buldhana. They also coordinated the monitoring of ICDS activities throughout the state conducted by selected medical colleges identified for this purpose.

=== Clinical Epidemiology Unit ===
The Clinical Epidemiology Unit was expanded to include more members after it was approved by IndiaCLEN. The Clinical Epidemiology Unit started its first activity with a capacity building program of its members. The unit has also started an orientation program for all the new post-graduate students who take admission at MGIMS, Sevagram.

== Life at campus ==
The institute is unique in following the Gandhian principles. All the students and staff wear khadi. The staff and the students participate in shram daan. The institute follows a strict vegetarianism policy. Alcohol consumption is prohibited in the institute.

=== Medical Orientation Camp ===
The newly admitted students spend 15 days in the Sevagram Ashram for the orientation to the Gandhian way of life. They follow the Ashram rules during these days. Some activities include Shramdan and spinning khadi. There are lectures from people from various runs of life.

=== Social Service camp ===
Every batch of medical students is allotted a small village from around Wardha. The students stay in that village for 15 days. Each student is allotted a certain number of families. He is responsible for the health concerns of all its members. The students spend this time giving health information to their families. They also learn a great deal about the real problems of the rural masses. The villagers are all given a free health checkup and are investigated for basic infections like malaria and filaria.

The students continue to visit this village for three years, once every month.

=== Re-Orientation to Medical Education Camp ===
The Re-Orientation to Medical Education or ROME camp is held at the end of second professional. It was previously held at the Kasturba Rural Health Training Center (KRHTC) at Aanji. Since 2008, it is being held at Rural Health Training center (RHTC) at Bhidi. This is a 15-day exercise where students learn aspects of Public Health and get hands on experience of the rural India.

== Notable alumni ==
- K.K. Aggarwal, cardiologist
- Mandeep R. Mehra, professor at Harvard Medical School

== See also ==
- Kasturba Gandhi
- Mahatma Gandhi Medical College & Research Institute
