= Prevention of Terrorism Act, 2002 =

Act of the Parliament of India

Parliament of India
- Long title: An Act to make provisions for the prevention of, and for dealing with, the terrorist activities and for matters connected therewith.
- Citation: Act No. 15 of 2002
- Territorial extent: India
- Passed by: Joint session of Parliament
- Passed: 26 March 2002
- Assented to: 28 March 2002
- Repealed: 21 September 2004

Repeals
- Prevention of Terrorism (Repeal) Act, 2004 (Act No. 26 of 2004)

Amended by
- Prevention of Terrorism (Amendment) Act, 2003 (Act No. 4 of 2004)
- Status: Repealed

The Prevention of Terrorism Act, 2002 (POTA) was an Act passed by the Parliament of India by Atal Bihari Vajpayee government in 2002, with the objective of strengthening anti-terrorism operations. The Act was enacted due to several terrorist attacks that were being carried out in India and especially in response to the attack on the Parliament. The Act replaced the Prevention of Terrorism Ordinance (POTO) of 2001 and the Terrorist and Disruptive Activities (Prevention) Act (TADA) (1985–1995), and was supported by the governing National Democratic Alliance. The Act was repealed in 2004 by the United Progressive Alliance coalition.

The bill was defeated in the Rajya Sabha (the upper house) by a 113–98 vote, but was passed in a joint session (425 Ayes and 296 Noes), as the Lok Sabha (lower house) has more seats. It was only the third time that a bill was passed by a joint session of both houses of Indian Parliament.

The Act defined what constituted a "terrorist act" and who a "terrorist" was, and granted special powers to the investigating authorities described under the Act. In order to ensure that discretionary powers granted to the investigating agencies were not misused and human rights violations were not committed, specific safeguards were built into the Act.

== Provisions compared to TADA ==
Similar to the provisions contained in TADA, the law provided that a suspect could be detained for up to 180 days without the filing of a chargesheet in court. However, a very major change was introduced, in that unlike TADA, this act had no provision to allow preventive detention.

Secondly, the matter of confessions made by the accused to the police. The general law in India does not recognise confessions made to police as evidence admissible in court, and permits a person to deny such confessions in court, but under POTA, confessions made to a police officer were admissible as evidence in court. POTA also allowed law enforcement agencies to withhold the identity of witnesses. Anti-Terrorism Day is celebrated on 21 May.

However, the POTA law did have some safeguards. Any decision on bail petitions or the verdict of the special courts constituted under this Act could be appealed against, and the appeal would be heard by a division bench of the relevant High Court.

== Review committee ==
The provisions in the Act mentioned the possibility of both state and central review committees, but offered few details as to their formation or use. As the Act began to be widely misused by the state governments, the central government finally established a review committee to hear individual cases related to this Act. At first, the committee functioned in a purely advisory capacity.

In December 2003, by an overwhelming majority, India's legislature amended the Act with an ordinance designed to expand the scope of judicial review. The new ordinance gave review commissions the authority to review the prima facie case of an "aggrieved person" and issue orders binding on the state government and police. Though the amendment was an improvement on the purely advisory capacity of the initial review committee because it enhanced the power of judicial review, the central review committee remained largely impotent, as it could not initiate an investigation absent an initial complaint and lacked clearly delineated investigatory powers. Moreover, the review committee's resources were limited, and it operated under no regulated time-frame. Without sufficient autonomy, resources, or guidelines, the committee was an illusory safeguard.

Given the review committee's limitations, only the grievances of those persons with political connections to the central government were likely to be heard. Further, even with political pressure from the central government and a favorable advisory opinion by the review committee, Tamil Nadu detained Vaiko for over four months without charge, and an additional fourteen months after charging him before granting bail.

== Impact and repeal ==
Once the Act came into force, many reports surfaced of the law being grossly abused. POTA was alleged to have been arbitrarily used to target political opponents. Only four months after its enactment, state law enforcement officers had arrested 250 people nationwide under the Act, and the number was steadily increasing. A mere eight months later, seven states where POTA was in force, had arrested over 940 people, at least 560 of whom were languishing in jail. Several prominent persons like Vaiko were arrested under the act.

The Act had a built-in expiry date three years after its commencement, vide section 1(6) of the Act. It had commenced on 24 October 2001, so was scheduled to expire on 24 October 2004. One month before its expiry, the Act was repealed on 21 September 2004 by the Prevention of Terrorism (Repeal) Ordinance, 2004, later substituted with the Prevention of Terrorism (Repeal) Act, 2004 (assented to on 21 December 2004). NDA asked UPA to introduce the Act again, but Congress criticized it and did not pass the Act.

== Prominent POTA cases ==
- Vaiko, founder and general secretary of the MDMK, was controversially arrested and jailed for 19 months under the POTA for his support to the Liberation Tigers of Tamil Eelam (LTTE).
- S.A.R. Geelani, a lecturer at Delhi University, was sentenced to death by a special POTA court for his alleged role in the 2001 attack on the Indian Parliament. He was later acquitted on appeal by the Delhi High Court on a legal technicality.
- Syed Ali Shah Geelani, Kashmiri nationalist and leader of the Jamaat-e-Islami group was arrested under POTA.
- Raghuraj Pratap Singh, a.k.a. Raja Bhaiya, a Member of the Legislative Assembly from Kunda, Uttar Pradesh was arrested on the charges of threatening a dissident BJP MLA Puran Singh Bundela with dire consequences. He was arrested the same night at 3:00 AM on orders of the then chief minister, Mayawati. He was sent to jail under POTA.

== See also ==
- Unlawful Activities (Prevention) Act
