= Chandrapal Singh Yadav =

Indian politician

MP of Rajya Sabha for Uttar Pradesh
- In office 26 November 2014 – 25 November 2020
- Succeeded by: Hardwar Dubey
- Constituency: Uttar Pradesh

Member of Parliament, Lok Sabha
- In office May 2004 – May 2009
- Preceded by: Sujan Singh Bundela
- Succeeded by: Pradeep Jain Aditya
- Constituency: Jhansi

Personal details
- Born: 19 March 1959 (age 67) Dakor, Uttar Pradesh, India
- Party: Samajwadi Party
- Spouse: Gyanwati Yadav
- Children: 1 son and 1 daughter
- Education: Bundelkhand University
- As of 21 September, 2006

Chandrapal Singh Yadav (born 19 March 1959) is an Indian politician who was as a member of the Rajya Sabha, the upper house of the Parliament of India. Yadav was recently elected as a president of the I.C.A (International Cooperative Alliance) - Asia Pacific region. He was previously a member of the 14th Lok Sabha (the lower house) for the Jhansi constituency in Uttar Pradesh. He was also a member of the Uttar Pradesh Legislative Assembly between 1996 and 2001.

== Early life and education ==
He was educated at Bundelkhand University and has MSc, M.A. (Geography), BEd and LL.B. degrees along with PhD from Bundelkhand University in 2006. He married Gyanwati Yadav on 1 January 1977, and the couple have a son and a daughter.

== Political career ==
Yadav served in the 14th Lok Sabha as a member of the Committee on Estimates, Committee on Energy and Committee on Members of Parliament Local Area Development Scheme.

Yadav has also been involved in public education programs focused on Dalits and has organised public dramatic performances which attack practices that Indian rationalists consider superstitions.

Yadav stood as a candidate in the 2014 Indian general election from Jhansi constituency and was defeated by Uma Bharti of the BJP.

In November 2014 he was one of eleven Samajwadi Party members who joined the Rajya Sabha upon election.

== President of International Co-operative Alliance ==
Dr. Chandra Pal Singh Yadav created history by winning hands down and becoming the first Indian to head International Co-operative Alliance (ICA) Asia-Pacific as its President.

Chandra Pal polled 185 votes while his rival Chitose Arai of Japan polled 83 votes. Yadav won by more than 102 votes, an unheard-of margin in international cooperative politics. Chandrapal Yadav has been the chairman of Krishak Bharati Cooperative Limited (KRIBHCO) from 1999 continuously till 2010. He was again elected as the Chairman of KRIBHCO in 2015, the post which he is currently holding. He was also one of the longest serving Presidents of NCUI. He held the Post of President NCUI for a period of more than 10 Years. He is also the board member of NAFED.
