= Bundelkhand University =

Public university in Jhansi, India

Coordinates: 25.4540°N 78.6086°E

- Motto: Vidyaya Amritmashnute
- Type: State University
- Established: 1975 (51 years ago)
- Academic affiliations: UGC
- Chancellor: Governor of Uttar Pradesh
- Vice-Chancellor: Mukesh Pandey
- Location: Jhansi, Uttar Pradesh, India
- Campus: 186 acres (0.75 km^{2}); Urban
- Website: www.bujhansi.ac.in

Bundelkhand University is a state university located in Jhansi, Uttar Pradesh, India. It was established in 1975 by a notification under the provision of the U.P. Universities Act.

== Administration ==
The Chancellor of the University is the Governor of Uttar Pradesh who serves as the ceremonial head of the institution. The Vice-Chancellor, currently Mukesh Pandey, is the chief executive and academic officer responsible for the administration and overall functioning of the university.

The university’s governance structure includes several statutory bodies including the Court, Executive Council, Academic Council and Finance Committee.

== Ranking ==
University rankings

Pharmacy – India
- NIRF (2024): 74

Bundelkhand University was ranked 74th in India by the NIRF (National Institutional Ranking Framework) in the pharmacy ranking in 2024. The university also holds NAAC A++ accreditation with a CGPA of 3.53.

== Academic departments ==
- The following is a list of academic departments in Bundelkhand University
  Faculty of Architecture
  - Institute of Architecture & Town Planning
  Faculty of Science
  - Institute of Basic Sciences
  - Institute of Physical Sciences
  - J.C Bose Institute of Life Science
  - Department of Bio-Technology
  - Department of Micro-Biology
  - Department of Ecotechnology.
  - Institute of earth sciences.
  - Institute of Engineering & Technology.
  - Institute of Food Technology.
  - Institute of Dr A P J Abdul Kalam forensic science.
  - Institute of Technical Education
  - Institute of Mathematical Sciences & Computer Applications.
  - Institute of Computer Science & Information Technology
  Faculty of Agriculture
  - Institute of Agricultural Sciences
  Faculty of Arts & Humanities
  - Institute of Economics & Finance Management
  - Dr. Ranganathan Institute of Library & Information Science
  - Dr. B R Ambedkar Institute of Social Sciences
  - Institute of Languages
  - Bhaskar Institute of Mass Communication and Journalism
  - Institute of Music & Fine Arts
  Faculty of Commerce
  - Institute of Health Management
  - Institute of Management Studies
  - Institute of Tourism & Hotel Management
  Faculty of Education
  - Major Dhyan Chand Institute of Physical Education
  - Institute of Education & Teaching
  - Institute of Professional Studies
  Faculty of Law
  - Babu Jagjivan Ram Institute of Law
  Faculty of Medicine
  - Institute of Biomedical Sciences
  - Institute of Ayurveda
  - Institute of Pharmacy

== Facilities ==
Facilities provided by Bundelkhand University include:

- Auditorium and Conference Halls
- Bank
- Bundelkhand University International Centre
- Central Library
- Computer Center
- Primary Health Center
- Post Office
- University Guest House

== Residential student hostels ==
- Dr BJR Samta PG Boys Hostel
- Lord Buddha Boys hostel
- New Boys Hostel
- Jhalkaribai Girls Hostel
- Samta Girls Host
- P.G Girls Hostel
- O.B.C Girls Hostel

== Notable alumni ==
- Chirag Paswan, MP & President of Lok Janshakti Party (dropout)
- Bhanu Pratap Singh Verma, MP
- Kunwar Pushpendra Singh Chandel, MP
- Anurag Sharma, MP
- Chandrapal Singh Yadav, MP
- Vishambhar Prasad Nishad, MP
- Amitabh Bajpai, MLA (Uttar Pradesh Assembly)
- Alka Lamba, ex-MLA (Delhi Assembly)
- Yogesh Tripathi, Indian Television Actor
