= Ranipur, Uttar Pradesh =

Ranipur
- Town
- Location in Uttar Pradesh, India Ranipur (India)
- Coordinates: 25.25°N 79.07°E
- Country: India
- State: Uttar Pradesh
- District: Jhansi
- Elevation: 205 m (673 ft)

Population (2001)
  - Total: 18,029

Languages
  - Official: Hindi
- Time zone: UTC+5:30 (IST)
- Vehicle registration: UP-93
- Website: up.gov.in

Ranipur is a town and a Nagar Panchayat (14 wards members) in Jhansi district in the Indian state of Uttar Pradesh.

== Geography ==
Ranipur is located at 25.25°N 79.07°E. It has an average elevation of 205 metres (672 feet).

== Demographics ==
As of the 2001 Census of India, Ranipur had a population of 18,029. Males constitute 53% of the population, and females make up 47%. Ranipur has an average literacy rate of 59%, lower than the national average of 59.5%: male literacy is 70%, and female literacy is 45%. In Ranipur, 16% of the population is under 6 years of age. The politics of this town is a barrier to the development of this town. For many years there is no sign of development has been found in this town. The town is waiting for a regeneration of Ranipur as a handloom and a textile city. Jal Vihar Festival is organized here every year. Bihari Lal Arya, former minister of UP state, also belongs to Ranipur.
