= Kasturba Hospital (Wardha) =

- Kasturba Health Society
- Shown in Sevagram

Geography
- Location: Sevagram, Wardha, Maharashtra, India
- Coordinates: 20°44′03″N 78°39′39″E

Organisation
- Type: Teaching
- Patron: Dr SP Kalantri

Services
- Emergency department: Yes
- Beds: 1000

History
- Founded: 1945

Links
- Website: http://www.mgims.ac.in
- Lists: Hospitals in India

The Kasturba Hospital was started in 1945 by Sushila Nayyar. It is a 1000-bed hospital, located in Sevagram, about 8 km from Wardha, and offers tertiary care healthcare facilities to rural patients.

In 1969, the Mahatma Gandhi Institute of Medical Sciences, a medical school, was founded and attached to the Kasturba Hospital.

== Hospital Information System ==
The entire hospital has been computerized since 2004. The HIS (Hospital Information System) was developed by the CDAC, Noida. All the patient information and reports are now online, improving professional access and greatly reducing the paper-based record keeping.
