= Vishwambhar Nath Sharma =

Indian Writer

Pandit Vishwambhar Nath Sharma Kaushik
- Born: Vishwambhar Nath; 10 May 1899; Ambala British India (present-day Haryana, India)
- Died: 10 December 1945 (aged 46); Kanpur, British India (present-day Kanpur, Uttar Pradesh, India)
- Occupations: Novelist, short story writer
- Writing career
- Language: Hindi
- Notable works: Raksha Bandhan, Kalp Mandir, Chitrashala, Prem Pratigya, Mani Mala, Kallol, Taai

Vishwambhar Nath Sharma or Kaushik (1899–1945) was an Indian writer of early 20th-century Hindi literature, best known for his contributions to the development of the Hindi short story. He is considered one of the early practitioners of psychological realism in Hindi fiction and is particularly remembered for his acclaimed short story Taai.

== Early life ==
Kaushik was born in 1899 in Ambala, Punjab, then part of British India. In 1903, he was adopted by his uncle Pandit Indarsen Sharma, a successful lawyer who had relocated from Ambala to Kanpur. Indarsen, known for his legal acumen and philanthropy, established a residence in Bengali Mohal, Kanpur, where Kaushik spent most of his life.

Initially inclined toward poetry in Urdu under the pen name "Ragib," Kaushik began his literary journey contributing poems and articles to Zamana, an Urdu journal edited by Munshi Dayanarayan Nigam. He was part of a literary circle that included emerging writers such as Munshi Premchand, then writing under the name Nawab Rai.

== Literary career ==
Under the influence of Mahavir Prasad Dwivedi, editor of the Hindi journal Saraswati, Kaushik transitioned from Urdu to Hindi. His first known Hindi story, Raksha Bandhan, was published in Saraswati in 1913. Over the following decades, Kaushik wrote over 300 short stories, contributing significantly to the Hindi short story tradition.

His stories often focused on domestic life, moral dilemmas, and psychological depth, distinguishing his work from that of his contemporaries. He employed a realist style, portraying middle-class characters in everyday situations with empathy and introspection.

Kaushik's most well-known story, Taai, explores the emotional transformation of a childless woman who steps into a maternal role during a crisis involving her nephew. The story is noted for its restraint, internal character development, and subtle social commentary, and is frequently cited alongside Chandradhar Sharma Guleri's Usne Kaha Tha as a landmark of early Hindi psychological fiction.

=== Published works ===
Kaushik's short stories were compiled in several collections, including:

- Raksha Bandhan
- Kalp Mandir
- Chitrashala
- Prem Pratigya
- Mani Mala
- Kallol

These works were widely published in Hindi literary magazines of the time and contributed to the shaping of modern Hindi prose.

== Personal life and legacy ==
Kaushik remained active in Kanpur's literary circles and maintained close associations with notable writers such as Premchand, Ganesh Shankar Vidyarthi, and Bhagwati Charan Verma. His residence in Bengali Mohal served as an informal hub for literary discussion during the 1930s and 1940s.

He died in 1945. His grandson, Neelambar Kaushik, preserved his literary legacy, including manuscripts, books, and correspondence. Neelambar himself was a writer and died in August 2022.

In 2023, the 125th birth anniversary of Vishwambhar Nath Sharma Kaushik was commemorated, renewing public and academic interest in his literary contributions.
