= Jhansi Nagar Assembly constituency =

Constituency of the Uttar Pradesh legislative assembly in India

Jhansi Nagar
- Constituency No. 223 for the Uttar Pradesh Legislative Assembly

Constituency details
- Country: India
- Region: North India
- State: Uttar Pradesh
- District: Jhansi
- Reservation: None

Member of Legislative Assembly
- 18th Uttar Pradesh Legislative Assembly
- Incumbent Ravi Sharma
- Party: Bharatiya Janta Party
- Elected year: 2022

Jhansi Nagar is the 223rd constituency of 403 elected constituencies in the Uttar Pradesh Legislative Assembly. It belongs to the general category. It falls under the Jhansi Lok Sabha seat and Jhansi district. The first M.L.A. of Jhansi, Atma Ram Govind Kher was speaker of the Uttar Pradesh assembly three times.

The seat is currently held by Ravi Sharma of the Bharatiya Janata Party (BJP).

Most Successful Parties by Percentage
1. BJP (9 times) (47.4%)
2. INC (6 times) (31.6%)
3. BKD (1 time) (5.26%)
4. BSP (1 time) (5.26%)
5. IND and Others (2 times) (10.5%)

== Members of Legislative Assembly ==
| Year | Member | Party |
|---|---|---|
| 1952 | Atmaram Govind Kher | Indian National Congress |
| 1957 | Atmaram Govind Kher | Indian National Congress |
| 1962 | Lakhpat Ram Sharma | Independent |
| 1967 | Narayan | Indian National Congress |
| 1969 | Jagmohan Verma | Bharatiya Kranti Dal |
| 1974 | Baboo Lal Tiwari | Indian National Congress |
| 1977 | Surya Mukhi Sharma | Janata Party |
| 1980 | Rajendra Agnihotri | Bharatiya Janata Party |
| 1985 | Om Prakash Richeariya | Indian National Congress |
| 1989 | Ravindra Shukla | Bharatiya Janata Party |
| 1991 | Ravindra Shukla | Bharatiya Janata Party |
| 1993 | Ravindra Shukla | Bharatiya Janata Party |
| 1996 | Ravindra Shukla | Bharatiya Janata Party |
| 2002 | Ramesh Kumar Sharma | Bahujan Samaj Party |
| 2004^ | Pradeep Jain Aditya | Indian National Congress |
| 2007 | Pradeep Jain Aditya | Indian National Congress |
| 2009^ | Kailash Sahu | Bahujan Samaj Party |
| 2012 | Ravi Sharma | Bharatiya Janata Party |
| 2017 | Ravi Sharma | Bharatiya Janata Party |
| 2022 | Ravi Sharma | Bharatiya Janata Party |

== Election results ==
=== 2027 ===
2027 Uttar Pradesh Legislative Assembly election: Jhasi Nagar
| Party | Candidate | Votes | % | ±% |
|---|---|---|---|---|
| INDIA | | | | |
| NDA | | | | |
| BSP | | | | |
| NOTA | None of the above | | | |
| Majority | | | | |
| Turnout | | | | |
| gain from | | Swing | | |

=== 2022 ===
2022 Uttar Pradesh Legislative Assembly election: Jhansi Nagar
| Party | Candidate | Votes | % | ±% |
|---|---|---|---|---|
| BJP | Ravi Sharma | 148,262 | 58.65 | +9.97 |
| SP | Sita Ram Kushwaha | 71,909 | 28.45 | |
| BSP | Kailash Sahu | 17,846 | 7.06 | −18.58 |
| INC | Rahul Richhariya | 8,841 | 3.5 | −17.66 |
| AIMIM | Sadik Ali | 2,325 | 0.92 | |
| NOTA | None of the above | 1,353 | 0.54 | +0.14 |
| Majority | | 76,353 | 30.2 | +7.16 |
| Turnout | | 252,793 | 59.88 | −0.96 |
| BJP hold | | Swing | +9.78% | |

=== 2017 ===
2017 Uttar Pradesh Legislative Assembly Election: Jhansi Nagar
| Party | Candidate | Votes | % | ±% |
|---|---|---|---|---|
| BJP | Ravi Sharma | 117,873 | 48.68 | |
| BSP | Sita Ram Kushwaha | 62,095 | 25.64 | |
| INC | Rahul Rai | 51,242 | 21.16 | |
| NOTA | None of the above | 953 | 0.4 | |
| Majority | | 55,778 | 23.04 | |
| Turnout | | 242,146 | 60.84 | |

== See also ==
- Legislative Assembly of India
- State Assembly elections in India
