= Uma Bharti =

15th Chief Minister of Madhya Pradesh

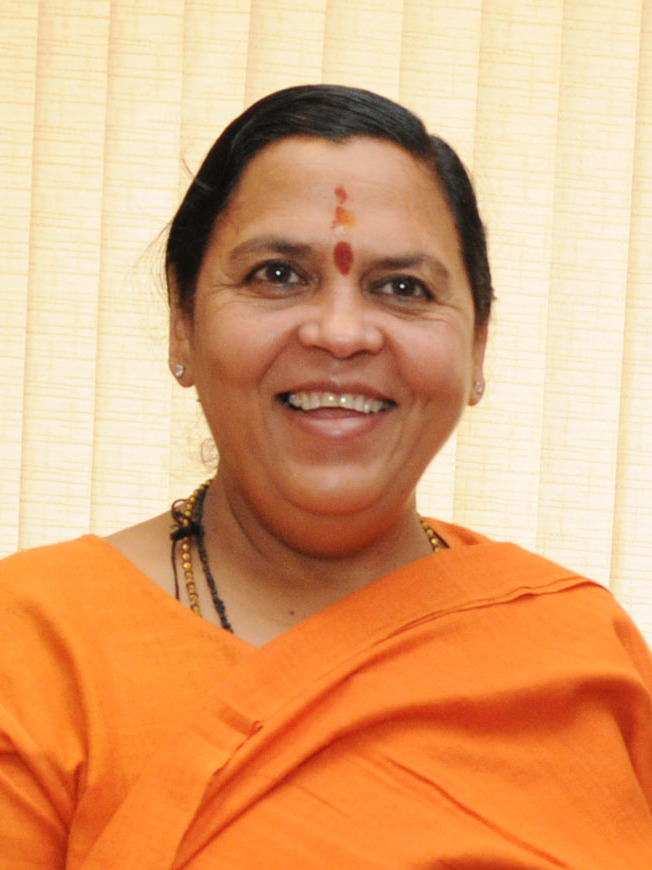
- Uma Bharti in 2014

Vice-President of Bharatiya Janata Party
- President: Amit Shah; Jagat Prakash Nadda

Union Cabinet Minister
- In office 16 May 2014 – 24 May 2019
- Ministry: Term
- Ministry of Drinking Water & Sanitation: 3 September 2017 - 24 May 2019
- Ministry of Water Resources, River Development & Ganga Rejuvenation: 16 May 2014 - 3 September 2017
- In office 7 November 2000 – 29 January 2003
- Ministry: Term
- Ministry of Coal: 26 August 2002 - 29 January 2003
- Ministry of Mines: 26 August 2002 - 29 January 2003
- Ministry of Youth Affairs and Sports: 7 November 2000 - 25 August 2002

Member of Parliament, Lok Sabha
- In office 16 May 2014 – 28 May 2019
- Preceded by: Pradeep Jain Aditya
- Succeeded by: Anurag Sharma
- Constituency: Jhansi
- In office 1999–2004
- Preceded by: Sushil Chandra Verma
- Succeeded by: Kailash Joshi
- Constituency: Bhopal
- In office 1989–1999
- Preceded by: Vidyawati Chaturvedi
- Succeeded by: Satyavrat Chaturvedi
- Constituency: Khajuraho

15th Chief Minister of Madhya Pradesh
- In office 8 December 2003 – 22 August 2004
- Preceded by: Digvijaya Singh
- Succeeded by: Babulal Gaur

Member of Madhya Pradesh Legislative Assembly
- In office 2003 – 2006
- Preceded by: Swami Prasad Lodhi
- Succeeded by: Kapur Chand Ghuwara
- Constituency: Malhara

Member of Uttar Pradesh Legislative Assembly
- In office 2012 – 2014
- Preceded by: Anil Kumar Ahirwar
- Succeeded by: Kaptan Singh
- Constituency: Charkhari

Personal details
- Born: 3 May 1959 (age 67) Tikamgarh, Madhya Pradesh, India
- Party: Bharatiya Janata Party

Uma Bharti (born 3 May 1959) is an Indian politician and former Chief Minister of Madhya Pradesh. She became involved with the Bharatiya Janata Party at a young age, unsuccessfully contesting her first parliamentary elections in 1984. In 1989, she successfully contested the Khajuraho seat, and retained it in elections conducted in 1991, 1996 and 1998. In 1999, she switched constituencies and won the Bhopal seat.

Bharti held various state-level and cabinet-level portfolios in the Ministry of Human Resource Development, Tourism, Youth Affairs and Sports, and also in Coal and Mines during the second as well as third ministry of Prime Minister Atal Bihari Vajpayee. After Narendra Modi became the Indian Prime Minister in 2014, she was appointed the Minister for Water Resources, River Development and Ganga Rejuvenation, and held this office until September 2017.

Bharti was among the leaders in the Ram Janmabhoomi movement of the 1980s and 1990s, organised by the Vishva Hindu Parishad. She was present at the demolition of the Babri Masjid, and was later acquitted by a special CBI court in relation to charges filed against her in the incident.

In the 2003 State Assembly polls, she led the BJP to a sweeping win in the Madhya Pradesh Legislative Assembly. She defeated her Indian National Congress (INC) opponent from the Malehra seat by a 25 per cent margin. She resigned from the post of Chief Minister in August 2004, when an arrest warrant was issued against her regarding the 1994 Hubli riot case. After a falling-out with the BJP, she established her own political party for a while before returning to the fold and being elected as a Member of the Legislative Assembly in the state of Uttar Pradesh. She was subsequently re-elected to the Lok Sabha, the lower house of the Parliament of India.

She is occasionally addressed by the Hindu honorific Sādhvī, a respectful Sanskrit title for a female renunciant.

== Early life ==
Uma Bharti was born on 3 May 1959 in Dunda, Tikamgarh District in the state of Madhya Pradesh to a family of peasants, belonging to the Lodhi caste. She attended school up until the sixth standard. As a child, she displayed considerable interest in religious texts like the Bhagvad Gita which led to her being seen as a "spiritual" child. She began to give religious discourses while still a child, which brought her into contact with Rajmata Vijayaraje Scindia, who would later become her political mentor. She describes herself in her youth as a "religious missionary".

== Political career ==
=== Rise to prominence and Ram Janmabhoomi ===
With the support of Vijaya Raje Scindia, Bharti became involved with the BJP in Madhya Pradesh while still in her twenties. In 1984, she contested Lok Sabha elections for the first time, but lost from Khajuraho (Lok Sabha constituency) as the INC saw a surge in support following the assassination of Indira Gandhi. In 1989, she won from Khajuraho Lok Sabha constituency, and retained the seat in the elections of 1991, 1996, and 1998. She was elected to Lok Sabha from Bhopal in 1999, and from Jhansi in 2014. She did not contest Lok Sabha elections in 2019.

Bharti rose to national prominence when she became one of the major faces of the Ram Janmabhoomi movement, alongside L. K. Advani and others. Her fiery speeches are credited for helping the movement achieve its momentum. In December 1992, she was one of several prominent Sangh Parivar figures present at a rally in Ayodhya that developed into a riot, culminating in the demolition of the Babri Mosque. Bharti was indicted for inciting a mob to violence by the Liberhan Commission that probed the incident. Bharti has denied that she incited the mob but says she does not regret it and that she is willing to take "moral responsibility" for the demolition. She acknowledges that the BJP reaped massive political benefits from the incident. In April 2017, the Supreme Court of India reinstated a criminal conspiracy case against Bharti and other BJP leaders.

Bharti has called for the BJP to stop avoiding responsibility for the Ram Janmabhoomi movement, saying:

The Bharatiya Janata Party (BJP) came to power twice at the Centre riding on the Ram Mandir movement wave. So it should not disown the movement and wriggle out of its responsibility for the Babri mosque demolition. I was in the BJP then and was present at the site on the fateful day. I am ready to face any consequence, even to go to jail.

She has also denied the presence of any conspiracy by the Sangh, while stating that she does not regret the demolition, as it furthers the goal of building a Ram Mandir there.

In the 1999 Lok Sabha elections, Bharti switched constituencies and won the Bhopal seat. She became a cabinet member of the Vajpayee administration, and held various state- and cabinet-level portfolios, being those for Human Resource Development, Tourism, Youth Affairs and Sports, and finally Coal and Mines.

=== Chief Minister ===
Bharti was appointed the Chief Ministerial candidate of the BJP for the 2003 Assembly polls in Madhya Pradesh. On the back of a fierce campaign based on a platform of development, and helped along by her reputation as a Hindutva firebrand, she led the party to a sweeping victory in which it won 173 out of 230 seats in the legislature. She was elected as a Member of the Legislative Assembly (MLA) of Madhya Pradesh.

=== Bharatiya Janashakti Party ===
In August 2004, after only a year in office, an arrest warrant was issued against Bharti in connection with the 1994 Hubli riots arising out of Hubli Idgah Maidan dispute, forcing her resignation. In November 2004, she had a public falling out with Advani during a meeting at the BJP headquarters. This led to a suspension from the BJP, which was revoked a few months later at the insistence of the Rashtriya Swayamsevak Sangh (RSS), a Hindu nationalist volunteer organisation. She continued to publicly defy the BJP high command, insisting that she replace Shivraj Singh Chouhan as the Chief Minister of Madhya Pradesh, which led to several show-cause notices from the party, and eventually, to her expulsion.

In response, Bharti floated her own political party, the Bharatiya Janshakti Party. She stated that her party followed the ideology of the RSS, and claimed that she had the support of Mohan Bhagwat, head of the RSS. However, the party had a marked lack of political success.

=== Re-entry into the BJP ===
Bharti was re-inducted into the BJP on 7 June 2011. She was tasked with reviving the party in Uttar Pradesh, ahead of that state's assembly election in 2012. In those elections, she was elected to the Uttar Pradesh Legislative Assembly from the Charkhari constituency. Subsequently, she was appointed to the position of party vice-president along with twelve others, as part of a team created to guide the BJP through the 2014 Lok Sabha elections. On 16 May 2014, she was elected to the Lok Sabha from Jhansi constituency by defeating Chandrapal Yadav of the Samajwadi Party. She served as the Minister for Water Resources, River Development and Ganga Rejuvenation from 26 May 2014 to 1 September 2017. She became the Minister of drinking water and sanitation on 3 September 2017. Uma Bharti donated one month of her salary to support the welfare of families of Central Reserve Police Force personnel murdered in the 2019 Pulwama attack perpetrated by a Kashmiri militant against the Indian Army.

== Threats against Walmart ==
In late November 2011, when the Government of India decided to allow 51% foreign direct investment in multi-brand retail and 100% in single brand retail, Uma Bharti threatened Walmart with arson should they enter the Indian market.

== See also ==
- Uma Bharti ministry (2003-2004)

Lok Sabha
Preceded by Pradeep Jain Aditya	Member of Parliament for Jhansi; 2014 – 2019	Succeeded by Anurag Sharma
Political offices
Preceded by Digvijaya Singh	Chief Minister of Madhya Pradesh; 8 December 2003 – 22 August 2004	Succeeded by Babulal Gaur
Preceded by (Erstwhile Ministry of Water Resources); Harish Rawat	Minister of Water Resources, River Development & Ganga Rejuvenation; 26 May 2014 – 3 September 2017	Succeeded by Nitin Gadkari
Preceded by Narendra Singh Tomar	Minister of Drinking Water and Sanitation; 3 September 2017 – 24 May 2019	Succeeded by Gajendra Singh Shekhawat; Ministry merged with the Ministry of Jal Shakti
