= KHS GmbH =

German supplier of filling and packaging systems

- Industry: Machine manufacturing and engineering
- Founded: 1993
- Headquarters: Dortmund, Germany
- Key people: Kai Acker (CEO), Prof. Dr.-Ing. Heinz Jörg Fuhrmann (Chairman of the Supervisory Board)
- Products: PET bottle design, blow molding technology and barrier coating, filling, inspection, labeling, packing systems and palletizing
- Revenue: 1,077 Billion Euros (2014)
- Number of employees: 4,673 (2014)
- Website: www.khs.com

KHS GmbH is a supplier of filling and packaging systems based in Dortmund, Germany. The company offers filling lines for glass and PET bottles, kegs, and cans for the beverage, food, and non-food industries, and is a wholly owned subsidiary of Salzgitter Klöckner-Werke GmbH, a member of Salzgitter AG.

== History ==
KHS GmbH was established in 1993 from a merger involving Holstein & Kappert AG of Dortmund (founded in 1868) and Seitz-Werke GmbH (founded in 1887), which later became SEN AG, Bad Kreuznach.

Timeline:

- 1868: Holstein & Kappert (H&K) is founded in Dortmund, Germany
- 1887: Seitz-Werke (later SEN) is founded in Bad Kreuznach, Germany
- 1977-1982 H&K (100%) and SEN (90%) acquired by Klöckner-Werke AG, Duisburg, Germany
- 1993: H&K and SEN merge to form KHS Maschinen- und Anlagenbau AG, Dortmund, Germany
- 2007: Salzgitter AG acquires the majority share in Klöckner-Werke
- 2008: KHS Corpoplast, KHS Plasmax, and KHS Moldtec are integrated into the Salzgitter Klöckner-Werke GmbH
- 2010: KHS AG becomes KHS GmbH
- 2011: KHS GmbH becomes a wholly owned subsidiary of Salzgitter Klöckner-Werke GmbH

== Key figures ==
In 2012, the KHS Group employs a workforce of 4,178 employees worldwide. Annual sales totaled 1008 million euros in 2012.

Sales figures in recent years:

- 2008: 986 million euros
- 2009: 727 million euros
- 2010: 918 million euros
- 2011: 917 million euros
- 2012: 980 million euros

Sales figures for 2012 by region:

- 37.7% Europe
- 28.1% Americas
- 20.1% CIS/Asia Pacific
- 14.0% Middle East/Africa

== Sites ==
Headquarters of KHS GmbH is Dortmund, Germany, which is also the site of one of the company's five German production facilities. Other German production sites are located in Bad Kreuznach, Hamburg, Kleve, and Worms.

The product centers for washing and pasteurizing technology and labeling and inspection technology are based in Dortmund.

The Bad Kreuznach plant specializes in the following areas of beverage filling engineering including aseptic technology: Filtration, beverage blending technology, high-gravity brewing systems, flash pasteurizing and deaerating systems, and rinsing, filling, caps and lid feeding, and sealing technologies for bottles and cans. The product center for kegging technology is also located here.

At its site in Kleve, KHS manufactures packaging equipment with the focus on the latest in final packaging.

The activities of KHS' plant in Worms are centered on packing and unpacking systems and palletizing equipment.

KHS Corpoplast and KHS Plasmax in Hamburg are focused on stretch blow molding and barrier technologies and the development of new types of plastic bottle.

KHS GmbH's production facilities outside Germany are situated in Brazil (São Paulo), the United States (Waukesha, WI; Sarasota, FL), Mexico (Zinacantepec), India (Ahmedabad), and China (Suzhou). The company also has branches in 83 countries around the globe. KHS GmbH's internal sales organization, sales offices, and subsidiaries handle sales for all products manufactured at each of the production sites.

== Areas of activity ==
=== Turnkey lines ===
The turnkey lines manufactured by KHS GmbH offer systems for every branch of industry, every type of container, and every process in the production of beverages. The container types offered include glass and PET bottles, cans, and kegs. Each KHS line comprises the individual machines required to carry out all beverage production processes ranging from PET bottle production, filling, labeling, packing, and palletizing up to and including inspection and complete sanitizing.

=== Processing systems ===
Another core area of KHS GmbH involves processing systems for simplifying and designing complex beverage production processes more efficiently. The various processes pertain to sanitizing systems, beverage blending systems, and the design and configuration of production lines.

== Management ==
The management of KHS GmbH:

- Kai Acker, Chief Executive Officer / Chief Technical Officer
- Martin Resch, Chief Financial Officer, Chief Human Resources Officer, Information Technology
- Prof. E.h. Dr.-Ing. Johann Grabenweger, Chief Sales Officer

== Supervisory Board ==
The members of the Supervisory Board of KHS GmbH are

- Prof. Dr.-Ing. Heinz Jörg Fuhrmann, Salzgitter, Chairman
- Erich Bach, Frankfurt/Main, Vice Chairman
- Konrad Ackermann, Dortmund
- Burkhard Becker, Hattingen
- Karl Ehlerding, Hamburg
- Roland Flach, Kronberg im Taunus
- Heinz Groschke, Büchen
- Nina Kemmsies, Dortmund
- Michael Kiekbusch, Hildesheim
- Ulrike Kletezka, Dortmund
- Willi Kumm, Fürfeld
- Artur Schreiber, Dortmund
