= Sushila Nayyar =

Indian politician and physician

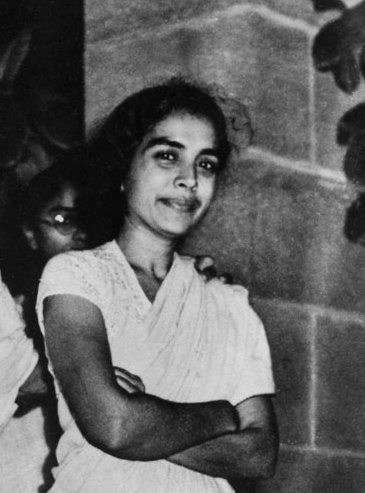
- Nayyar in 1947
- Born: 26 December 1914; Kunjah, British India
- Died: 3 January 2001 (aged 86)
- Education: Lady Hardinge Medical College; Johns Hopkins School of Public Health
- Occupations: physician, politician and lifelong follower of Mahatma Gandhi
- Relatives: Pyarelal Nayyar (brother)

Sushila Nayyar, also spelt 'Nayar' (26 December 1914 – 3 January 2001), was an Indian physician, Gandhian and politician who served as the Minister of State for Health and Family welfare. She played a leading role in public health, medical education and social and rural reconstruction in India. She became Gandhi's personal physician and an important member of his inner circle. Later, she wrote several books based on her experiences. Her brother, Pyarelal Nayyar, was the personal secretary to Gandhi.

== Biography ==
=== Early life and education ===
She was born on 26 December 1914 in Kunjah, a small town in the Gujarat district of Punjab (now in Pakistan). She developed an early attraction to Gandhian ideals through her brother and had even met Gandhi as a young child in Lahore. She came to Delhi to study medicine at Lady Hardinge Medical College, from where she earned her MBBS and MD. Throughout her college days, she remained in close contact with the Gandhis.

=== Association with Gandhi during India's freedom struggle ===
In 1939 she came to Sevagram to join her brother, and quickly became a close associate of the Gandhi's. Shortly after her arrival, cholera broke out in Wardha, and the young medical graduate tackled the outbreak almost singlehandedly. Gandhi praised her fortitude and dedication to service, and with the blessing of B.C. Roy appointed her as his personal physician. In 1942 she returned once more to Gandhi's side, to take part in the Quit India Movement that was sweeping the country. That year she was imprisoned along with other prominent Gandhians at the Aga Khan Palace in Poona. In 1944 she set up a small dispensary at Sevagram, but this soon grew so large it disturbed the peace of the ashram, and she shifted it to a guesthouse donated by the Birlas, in Wardha. In 1945 this little clinic formally became the Kasturba Hospital (now the Mahatma Gandhi Institute of Medical Sciences). This time was, however, highly fraught; several attempts were made on Gandhi's life, including Nathuram Godse, the man who ultimately killed him, and Sushila Nayyar testified on several occasions to the attacks. In 1948 she appeared before the Kapur Commission regarding the incident in Panchgani in 1944 when Nathuram Godse allegedly tried to attack Gandhi with a dagger.

Being a close associate of Mahatma Gandhi, Sushila Nayyar was one of the women to take part in his celibacy tests.

=== Further education and public service ===
After Gandhi's assassination in 1948 in Delhi, Sushila Nayyar went to the United States, where she took two degrees in public health from the Johns Hopkins School of Public Health. Returning in 1950, she set up a tuberculosis sanatorium in Faridabad, the model township on the outskirts of Delhi set up on cooperative lines by fellow Gandhian Kamaladevi Chattopadhyay. Nayyar also headed the Gandhi Memorial Leprosy Foundation.

=== Political career ===
In 1952 she entered politics and was elected to the Legislative Assembly of Delhi. From 1952 to 1955 she served as Health Minister in Nehru's cabinet. She was Speaker of the Delhi Vidhan Sabha (as the State Assembly had been renamed) from 1955 to 1956. In 1957, she was elected to the Lok Sabha, from Jhansi Constituency, and served till 1971. She was Union Health Minister again from 1962 to 1967. During the congress regime, she fell out with Indira Gandhi and joined (Janata party). She was elected to Lok Sabha from Jhansi in 1977 when her new party was voted to power that created history by overthrowing Indira Gandhi's government. Thereafter she retired from politics to devote herself to the Gandhian ideal. She had set up the Mahatma Gandhi Institute of Medical Sciences in 1969, and remained committed to confine her energies to developing and extending it.

=== Personal life and death ===
She remained unmarried throughout her life. On 3 January 2001, she died due to a cardiac arrest.

== Legacy ==
Sushila Nayyar was deeply influenced by the Gandhian philosophy of hard work and abstinence. She was a follower of Gandhian thoughts. She felt strongly about the need for prohibition and linked this to the domestic concerns of poor women whose lives were often blighted by alcoholism in their husbands. She was also a staunch campaigner for family planning, once again seeing this as essential empowerment for women, especially poor women. In her personal life, she practiced strict discipline and expected this also of her followers, acolytes and students. She was one of the circle of young women who followed Gandhi and were deeply impressed by his charisma and magnetism, such that he became the central focus of their lives. She never married. In an age when it was extremely difficult for single young women to have careers, she managed by sheer grit and dedication to carve out a life for herself without concessions to her gender or status. She also believed like Gandhi that there was no such thing as a dirty job, and that medicine required hands-on involvement with patients and their ailments, regardless of feminine delicacy or upper caste squeamishness. However, she could also be authoritarian and unforgiving about other people's foibles, and expected similar levels of sacrifice and ruthlessness from those around her.

== Published works ==
- The Story of Bapu's Imprisonment (1944)
- Amaran Ba (Our Ba) written along with Vanamala Parikh (1945)
- Kasturba, Wife of Gandhi (1948)
- Kasturba Gandhi: A Personal Reminiscence (1960)
- Family Planning (1963)
- Role of Women in Prohibition (1977)
- Mahatma Gandhi: Satyagraha at Work (Vol. IV) (1951)
- Mahatma Gandhi: India Awakened, (Vol. V)
- Mahatma Gandhi: Salt Satyagraha – The Watershed, (Vol. VI)
- Mahatma Gandhi: Preparing For Swaraj, (Vol. VII)
- Mahatma Gandhi: Final Fight For Freedom, (Vol. VIII) (c. 1990)
- Mahatma Gandhi: The Last Phase (completed for her brother Pyarelal, the tenth volume in his biography of Gandhi, published by the Navajivan Publishing House.)
