= Puran Singh Bundela =

Indian politician

Puran Singh Bundela is an Indian politician. He is a three-time Member of the Legislative Assembly (MLA) from Mahroni constituency in Uttar Pradesh.

== Early career ==
Puran Singh Bundela started off his political career from the party of Indian National Congress and was chosen as a member of Uttar Pradesh Assembly for the first time in the 1980s. Since then, he's been fighting elections from Bharatiya Janata Party (BJP) which he left six months prior to 2007 General Elections. He is now in the Indian National Congress.

== Allegations ==
In 2002, Puran Singh Bundela accused Raghuraj Pratap Singh, alias Raja Bhaiya, and Dhananjay Singh, both independent MLAs, of threatening and tried to abduct him. The pretext was that Bundela had ceased to align himself with them. The two accused were arrested and jailed.
