= Mahroni =

Mahroni महरौनी
- Town
- Location in Uttar Pradesh, India Mahroni (India)
- Coordinates: 24°35′10″N 78°43′44″E
- Country: India
- State: Uttar Pradesh
- District: Lalitpur

Government
  - Type: Nagar Panchayat
- Elevation: 365 m (1,198 ft)

Population (2001)
  - Total: 8,647

Languages
  - Official: Hindi

Religions
  - Percentage: Hindu 74.47%, Muslim 12.92%, Christian 0.03%, Sikh 0.10%, Buddhist 0.01%, Jain 12.32%, Others 0.00%, No Religion 0.16%
- Time zone: UTC+5:30 (IST)
- PIN: 284405
- Vehicle registration: UP94
- Website: lalitpur.nic.in

Mahroni is a town and a nagar panchayat in Lalitpur district in the Indian state of Uttar Pradesh. It is one of the tehsils of Lalitpur District also a legislative assembly constituency Mehroni Assembly constituency and is situated 37 km away from Lalitpur. It is very close to Madhya Pradesh and Uttar Pradesh border.

== Geography ==
Mahroni ( PIN 284405, STD CODE 05172 ) is a tehsil of Lalitpur District. It is about 37 km. from Lalitpur and 21 km from Tikamgarh (one of the 55 districts of Madhya Pradesh). The nearest railway station is the Tikamgarh Station. Mahroni is about 14 km from Kundeshwar Mahadev temple, an important Hindu religious site for locals.

== Demographics ==
As of the 2001 Census of India, Mahroni had a population of 8647. Males constitute 53% of the population and females 47%. Mahroni has an average literacy rate of 67%, higher than the national average of 59.5%: male literacy is 76%, and female literacy is 56%. In Mahroni, 16% of the population is under 6 years of age.

Mannu kori (State Minister) BJP won the election with 1,00,000 VOTES by defeating feran lal(BSP) With the help of Bjp workers.
