= Markua =

Village in Garautha tehsil, Jhansi district, Uttar Pradesh, India

Markua, also spelled, Markuwa is a village in Garautha tehsil, Jhansi district, Uttar Pradesh, India. The village is famous for a Hindu temple named Ramraja Sarkar. A temple of the same name also exists in Orchha, Madhya Pradesh.

== Geography ==
Markua is located at 25.43°N 79.26°E.

== Other ==
Markua has a Government junior high school, a primary health center, office and a godown of Seeds Corporation of India, a sub police station and a rest house of the Irrigation Department.
