= Palra =

Palra is the name of the following Indian villages:

- Palra, Gurgaon, Haryana
- Palra (Jhajjar), Haryana, birthplace of Victoria Cross recipient Umrao Singh
- Palra (Hamirpur), Uttar Pradesh
- Palra, Jhansi, Uttar Pradesh
- Palra (Meerut), Uttar Pradesh
- Palra (Muzaffarnagar), Uttar Pradesh, important to the Muley Jats

== See also ==
- Palra d'El Rebollal, an Asturian-Leonese-Extremaduran dialect spoken in El Rebollar, Salamanca, Spain
