= Gursarai =

- Town
- Location in Uttar Pradesh, India
- Coordinates: 25.62°N 79.18°E
- Country: India
- State: Uttar Pradesh
- District: Jhansi

Government
  - विधान सभा का सदस्य [MLA]: Jawahar Lal Rajpoot (Bharatiya Janata Party)
  - नगर पालिका अध्यक्ष: Jaipal singh Chauhan
- Elevation: 174 m (571 ft)

Population (2011)
  - Total: 26,857

Languages
  - Official: Hindi bundeli
- Time zone: UTC+5:30 (IST)
- PIN: 284202
- Vehicle registration: UP-93

Gursarai is a city and municipal board in the Jhansi district of the Indian state of Uttar Pradesh. Gursarai is situated in the Garautha Tehsil. An emerging city in Jhansi District With having an old and established market, it's a lifeline for the nearby village people who come and sell their farm produces.

== History ==
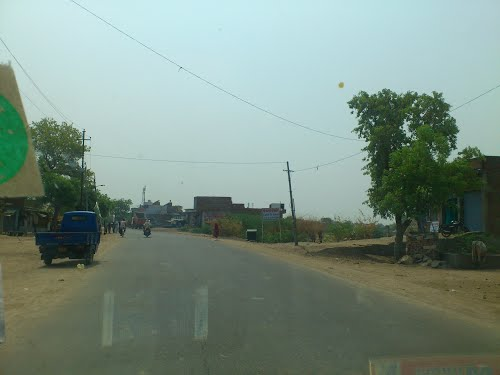
Gursarai Roads

The town of Gursarai was founded with a grant of land given to the chief of the Peshwas of Malwa, Mukundraj Kher, for his service during the Second Battle of Panipat. Mukundraj supposedly won the battle for the Peshwas by poisoning the food of a Mughal General when the latter visited the Peshwa court. This act led to the withdrawal of Mughal armies from the borders of the Malwa Empire. The state of Gursarai came into the possession of a Brahmin family of the Bhao Sahibs in this wise. In 1731 the Peshwa appointed Bala Rao (who had come to these parts in 1725) to manage his properties that were in the Jhansi district. Bala Rao made Gursarai his headquarters. Some time after 1888 Kesho Rao (Bala Rao's grandson) became for all practical purposes the ubaridar of this estate, the ubarijama (land revenue of the estate) paid by him being Rs 22,000. The estate continued in the possession of this family and in the first decade of this century it comprised 65 villages of which 47 lay in tahsil Garautha and 18 in tahsil Moth

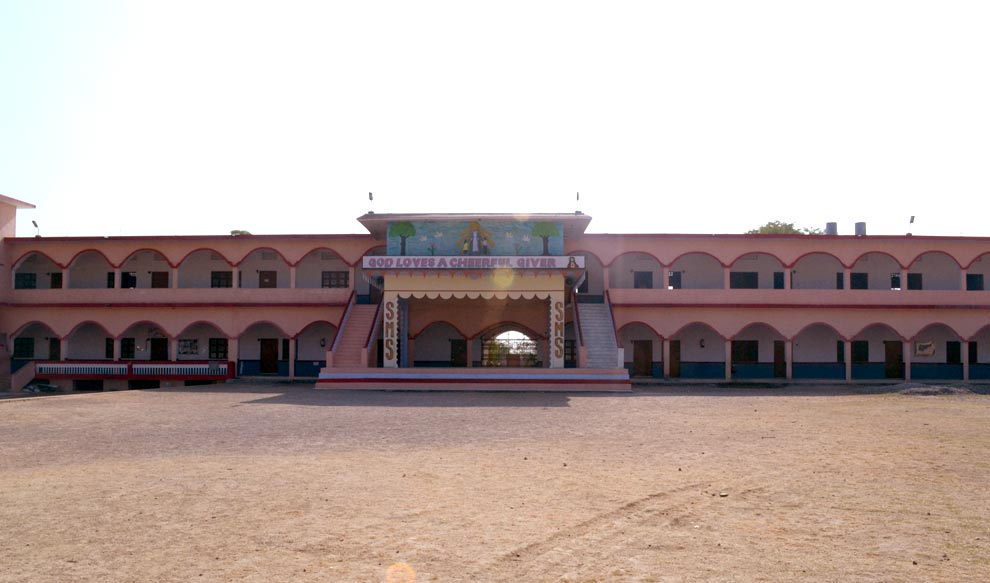
St. Mary's School, Gursarai

Gursarai is situated in Jhansi, Uttar Pradesh, India. It has the geographical coordinates 25° 37' 0" N, 79° 11' 0" E. Its original name was Pilaingura (Hindi: पिलाइंगुरा).

== Demographics ==
Gursarai is a Nagar Palika Parishad (Municipal Board) city in the district of Jhansi, Uttar Pradesh. The city is divided into 25 wards, in which elections are held every five years. As of 2011, the population of Gursarai Nagar Palika Parishad was 26,869, with 14,127 males and 12,742 females, as described in the 2011 Census of India.

There are 3266 children aged 0–6 in Gursarai, comprising 12.16% of the population. The female sex ratio is 902 compared to the average of 912 in Uttar Pradesh. The child sex ratio in Gursarai is around 851 females per 1,000 males, compared to an Uttar Pradesh state average of 902 females per 1,000 males. The literacy rate in Gursarai is 83.65%, which is higher than the state average of 67.68%. Male literacy is around 91.75% and female literacy is around 74.75%.

8,217 people in Gursarai are officially engaged in work or business activities, of which 7,054 are males and 1,163 are females. Of the total working population, 71.71% of workers were engaged in 'main work' while 28.29% of workers were engaged in 'marginal work.'

The Gursarai Nagar Palika Parishad (Gursarai Municipal Board) has administration over 4,920 houses, to which it supplies basic amenities like water and sewage. It is also authorized to build roads within the Nagar Palika Parishad area and impose taxes on properties under its jurisdiction.

== Religion ==
Table showing the religious composition of Gursarai:

Religion	Percentage	Number of People
Hindu	85.74%	23037
Muslim	11.17%	3001
Jain	2.98%	801
Christian	0.04%	107
Sikh	0.02%	54
Buddhist	0.00%	n/a
Other	0.00%	n/a
Not Stated	0.05%	134

== Education ==
K-12 education and schools of higher education are available in Gursarai. The degree colleges in Gursarai are affiliated with Bundelkhand University.

=== Higher education ===
- JN Modi Mahavidyalaya
- Dr. Ram Manohar Lohia Girls College

=== Schools ===
- Kher Inter College Girls
- GIC
- Prathmik Vidyalaya
- St. Mary's School
- T.M.A.R.Kher Inter College
- Shree Kalyan Bal Vidhya Mandir
- Shree Mahaveer Bal Shiksha Sanskar Kendra
- K.C. Jain Memorial Public School
- Allahabad Public School, Bade Hanuman Ji ke Mandir Ke pas, Bajrang Nagar, Gursarai
- S.R.S Public School
- Vedic International School
- Buds N Blooms School
- P.S.D Arjaria School
- Gursarai Kids Academy School
- late shree prabhudayal vaishya public junior high school

== Significant Locations ==
- Bada Talab near Badi Mata Mandir
- Bade Hanuman Ji Ka Mandir, Nai Basti, Mandi ke Pechee, Gursarai
- Inderdan group of Talab near petrol pump on Mauranipur Road
- Siddha Baba Temple, Earch Road.
- Bhasneh Talab and nature reserve
- Hulki Mata Mandir
- Historical Hill Madori
- Badi Mata Mandir Madori
- Shree Daas Hanuman Ji Mandir, Patkana
