= Babu Lal Tiwari =

Indian politician

Babu Lal Tiwari is an Indian politician who is serving as Member of Uttar Pradesh Legislative Council from Allahabad–Jhansi teacher constituency. He is the first person from Jhansi who was elected to the council.
