= Gonti =

Villiage in India

Gonti is an ancient and historical village near the river Betwa in India and has a temple to Lord Hanuman i.e. Shahpura Sarkar Prachin Hanuman Mandir.

== History ==
The river Betwa is also called the Ganga of Bundelkhand, as it is one of the most important rivers there. Situated 10 km away from Erach, 45 km away from Garautha sub-district headquarters and 80 km away from Jhansi district headquarters, Gonti is famous for Shahpura Sarkar Prachin Hanuman Mandir.

In this mandir the idol of Lord Hanuman is about 12 feet tall. Every Tuesday, a large crowd of bhakts use to visit this temple to ask for their wishes to be granted. Locals believe that worshiping Lord Hanuman in this place guaranteed their fulfilment, as this place is considered the tapashya Sthali of Lord Hanuman.

== Demographics ==
The major population of this village are Hindus.

Area (2020)	16.38 km²
Population (2020)	2973
Population Density	159 people per km²
Male Population	852
Female Population	703
Nearest airport & distance (Aerial)	Gwalior Airport, 152 km Kanpur Airport 150 km
Nearest Railway Station & Distance (Aerial)	Erach Road 16 km

== Gonti fort ==
A fort situated in the vicinity of Shahpura Sarkar Pracheen Hanuman Mandir dates from about 1600 AD. The locals believe that due to curse of a girl, the kingdom and its whole population died due in a pandemic.

The fort is abandoned due to lack of maintenance And because locals also believe that taking anything from the fort triggers the curse.

== Education ==
• Prathmik Vidyaalay Gonti

• Purv Madhyamik Vidyalay Gonti

• Prathmik Vidyalay Shahpura Buzurg
