= Isuri =

- Born: 1838; Mendki, Mauranipur, Jhansi district, Uttar Pradesh, India
- Died: 1909 (aged 70–71)
- Other names: Isuri Babba, Hartal Isuri, Isuri Prasad
- Occupation: Bundeli poet
- Notable work: Over a thousand Phaag (folk songs), Chaukaria Phag
- Parent: Bholanath Arjariya (father)

Isuri (1838—1909) is a Bundeli poet from Bundelkhand region. He is credited with having composed over a thousand Phaag, a form of folk songs.

The poetic works of Isuri have gained widespread acclaim among the people of the Bundelkhand region. His four-lined compositions, known as Chaukaria Phag, have become integral to the local folk musical tradition of the Bundelkhand region and Madhya Pradesh.

== Life ==
Isuri was born in the village of Mendki in the present-day Mauranipur tehsil of Jhansi district in the state of Uttar Pradesh. He was popularly known as Isuri Babba. His full name was Hartal Isuri or Isuri Prasad. He was a contemporary of Pandit Gangadhar Vyas during the Bharatendu era.

Isuri's father was named Bholanath Arjariya. After losing his parents in childhood, he was raised in his maternal grandmother's house. His ancestors originated from the Orchha State and later settled in Mendki village. The house where Isuri lived still stands in Mendki village of Mauranipur tehsil.

He chose to write about the ongoing situation, creating awareness among the people of Bundelkhand against British rule. His romantic poetry was inspired by a girl named Rajjo or Rajau. Isuri also wrote about the culture and traditions of Bundelkhand. His works are recognized for their authentic representation of rural culture and beauty.

Numerous books featuring collections of Isuri's poetry and phaag have been published by various government and literary organizations, including Sahitya Akademi, Bundelkhand Sahitya Akademi, Adivasi Lok Kala Academy, and Madhya Pradesh Sanskrit Parishad.

== Legend ==
In 2013, the Madhya Pradesh School of Drama (MPSD) students performed the play Hansa Ud Chal Des, depicting the life of Isuri, at the Ravindra Bhavan Auditorium, Bhopal. A research institute, Isuri Shodh Sansthan, was established in his village Mendki, but due to government neglect, it has since been closed.

Under the Madhya Pradesh government, the Madhya Pradesh Sahitya Academy has established the Isuri Puraskar, an annual literary award recognizing writers or poets for their noteworthy contributions to Bundeli folk poetry and literature.
