= Khailar =

- Census town
- Location in Uttar Pradesh, India Khailar (India)
- Coordinates: 25.35°N 78.53°E
- Country: India
- State: Uttar Pradesh
- District: Jhansi
- Elevation: 317 m (1,040 ft)

Population (2001)
  - Total: 12,343

Languages
  - Official: Hindi
- Time zone: UTC+5:30 (IST)
- Vehicle registration: UP
- Website: up.gov.in

Khailar is a census town in Jhansi district in the Indian state of Uttar Pradesh. There is famous Hanuman temple in Khailar.

== Geography ==
Khailar is located at 25.35°N 78.53°E. It has an average elevation of 317 metres (1040 feet).Khailar is well known for its history. When India was not divided, Khailar was considered as the center point of India.

== Demographics ==
As of 2001 India census, Khailar had a population of 12,343. Males constitute 53% of the population and females 47%. Khailar has an average literacy rate of 71%, higher than the national average of 59.5%: male literacy is 78%, and female literacy is 63%. In Khailar, 12% of the population is under 6 years of age.
