= List of subdistricts in India =

Subdistricts of India
- Category: Subdistricts (Tehsils)
- Location: Republic of India
- Created by: Constitution of India
- Created: 26 January 1950
- Number: 6057 (as of 2018)
- Populations: Tehsil: Mauranipur – 393,994 (highest)
- Areas: Tehsil: Mauranipur – 1,112 km^{2} (429 sq mi) (Largest)
- Government: Government of India; State governments
- Subdivisions: Villages; Districts; Tehsils

India has 28 states and eight union territories, which are divided into divisions comprising several districts. Subdistricts are most commonly referred to as tehsils, which comes under a sub-division of a district. The current terms have replaced earlier geographical terms, such as pargana and thana.

Most subdistricts in India correspond to an area within a district including the designated city, town, hamlet, or other populated place that serves as its administrative centre, with possible additional towns, and usually a number of villages.

In the Indian administrative context, states adopt various nomenclatures for their sub-district divisions, including Tehsil, Taluk, Circle, Subdivision, and Mandal. Notably, Tehsil predominates in North Indian states, whereas Taluk is prevalent in South Indian states. These delineations exist beneath the level of revenue division/sub-division within the administrative framework of a district. Each sub-district is headed by a tehsildar/mamlatdar/mandal revenue officer.

== List of sub-districts ==
The following is the list of tehsil,or its equivalent administrative units in India:

State/ Union territory	Sub-district	No. of Subdistricts
Andaman and Nicobar Islands (Union Territory)	Tehsil	9
Andhra Pradesh	Mandal	686
Arunachal Pradesh		209
Assam		160
Bihar	Tehsil	537
Chandigarh		1
Chhattisgarh		251
Dadra and Nagar Haveli and Daman and Diu (Union Territory)		3
Delhi (Union Territory)		33
Goa		12
Gujarat		284
Haryana	Tehsil	143
Himachal Pradesh		190
Jammu and Kashmir (Union Territory)	Tehsil	208
Jharkhand		264
Karnataka	Taluka	240
Kerala	Taluk	78
Ladakh		15
Lakshadweep		10
Madhya Pradesh	Tehsil	440
Maharashtra		358
Manipur		65
Meghalaya		56
Mizoram		28
Nagaland		120
Odisha		537
Puducherry		8
Punjab		97
Rajasthan		426
Sikkim		18
Tamil Nadu	Taluk	316
Telangana		594
Tripura		23
Uttar Pradesh	Tehsil	350
Uttarakhand		129
West Bengal		346
Total		7,244

Source: Local Government Directory, Ministry of Panchayati Raj, Government of India. Figures are from the report accessed on 16 October 2026.

== See also ==
- List of community development blocks in India
- List of districts in India
