= Music of Madhya Pradesh =

Madhya Pradesh is a state of India. Music from the area includes rural folk and tribal music, ceremonial and ritual music and Indian classical music. Unlike in many parts of India, the people of Madhya Pradesh place few restrictions on who can sing which songs. With the exception of some ritualistic works, people sing songs from across ethnic and racial boundaries.

== Background ==
In Bastar, the Muria and Sing Maria tribes are known for the songs called relo, which are sung by children. The same region is home to the dhankul songs associated with invoking Danteshwari, a goddess, and the seasonal chait parah. Around Jagdalpur, leha songs are popular. They are sung as part of a ritual for the departure of a loved one. The Kamar people are known for a kind of marriage song, often addressed to legendary trumpeter Moharia.

Bundelkhand and Baghelkand, home of the Baghelas, are a land known for semi-historical songs devoted to Hardaul and other deities. Many songs in this area were written by the poet Isuri. Pai songs are sung, accompanied by the saira dance, during the rainy season.

In the south of Nimad, philosophical nirguni lavani and ertoci shringari lavani songs are popular. The same area, as well as Malwa, are inhabited by the musically inclined Adivasi people.

Various kinds of drums are found throughout Madhya Pradesh. These include the large drums of Bastar, the dhols and maandals played by the Bhils, the Muria parang and the ghera, damahu, timki, tasa, chang and dphala.

The bans is an instrument unique to Madhya Pradesh, though it is similar to the ayar kuzhal of the south. It is an aerophonic instrument about four feet in length, made of bamboo, and played by the Rawats.

== Rock/metal music ==
=== Indore ===
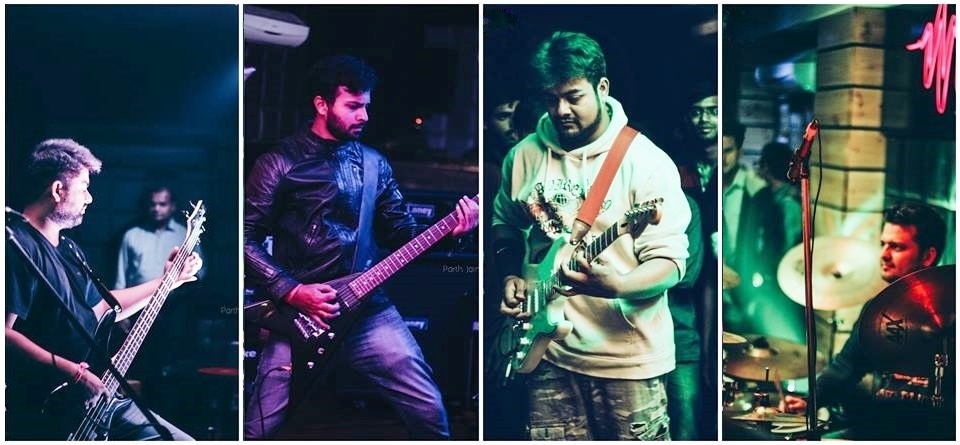
Nicotine is a metal/meavy metal band from Indore

The Indore scene, initially ignored by the mainstream Rock/Metal fraternity, has been emerging as the 'Dark Horse' of Indian Rock and Metal Scene since mid 2000s. Though metal dominates the scene, the city has produced bands from all kinds of genre (Classic Rock, Alternative, Hard Rock, Death Metal).

Nicotine, formed in December 2006, is one of the most known Metal Rock bands in Central India.

== See also ==
- Indian Rock
