= Mauranipur =

Biggest Town in Uttar Pradesh, India

- Town
- Mauranipur
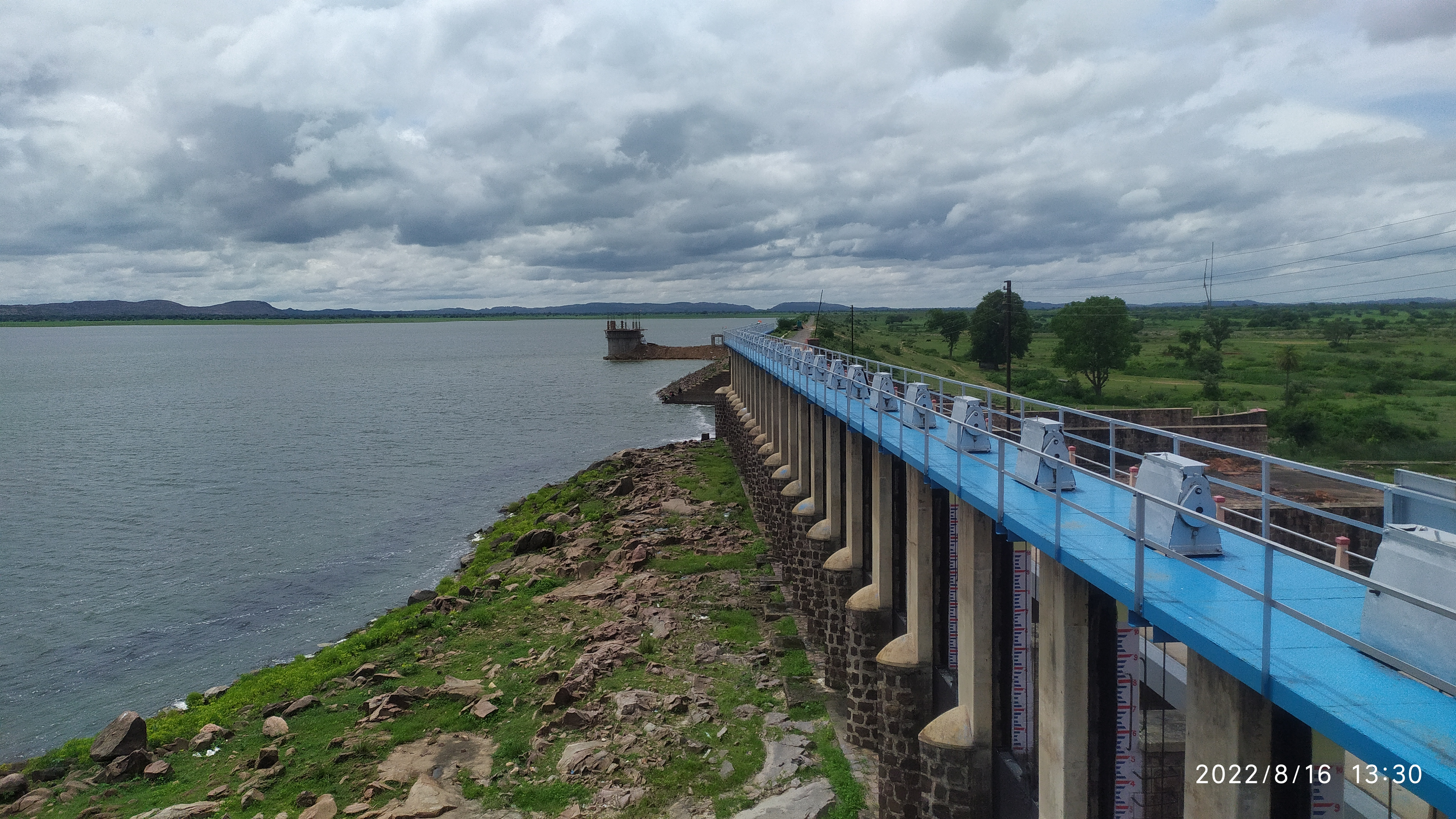
- Saprar dam

- Location in Uttar Pradesh, India
- Coordinates: 25°14′23″N 79°11′47″E
- Country: India
- State: Uttar Pradesh
- District: Jhansi

Government
  - MLA: Rashmi Arya (AD(BJP))

Population (2011)
  - Total: 61,449

Languages
  - Official: Hindi
  - Local: Bundelkhandi
- Time zone: UTC+5:30 (IST)
- PIN: 284204
- Telephone code: 91-5178
- Vehicle registration: UP-93
- Website: http://www.npp-maujhs.in/mauranipur.html

Mauranipur is a town and a municipal board in Jhansi district state of Uttar Pradesh, India. It is located in the Jhansi District. This town was known for textile production, known in ancient times as Madhupuri. Because of its high density of temples, it is known by some locals as Mini-Ayoddhya. Jalvihar Mela and Viman Yatra are the most famous events in Mauranipur. The Kedareshwar temple and the Saprar Dam are located near Mauranipur.

== Geography ==
Mauranipur is located at {25°14′23″N 79°11′47″E}. It has an average elevation of 192 metres (630 ft). The Sukhnai, a tributary of the Dhasan River which itself is a tributary of the Vetravati, flows from west to east around the city.

Mauranipur is 60.43 km from the city of Jhansi, and 252 km from Uttar Pradesh's capital city Lucknow.

== Dam and lakes ==
- Saprar Dam is approximately 7 km from Mauranipur, on the Sukhnai River.
- Siaori Lake is situated approximately 8 km northwest of Mauranipur, near the village of Siaori on the Lakheri River. This lake was renovated in 1906 and opened for irrigation. It receives water from the Kamla Sagar, which has increased irrigation capacity.
- Pahari Dam is approximately 18 km east of Mauranipur on the Dhasan River, it was built between the years 1909–1912. This serves the purpose of irrigation through the Lachura Dam, mainly in the Hamirpur district. The 16.46-metre Pahari weir provides irrigation to Jhansi district. The gross capacity of the reservoir is 47,800,000 cubic metres and the live storage capacity is 46,000,000 cubic metres.
- Lakheri Dam is situated upstream of the junction of the Chiraya and Tola Nalas, near the village of Mahewa, approximately 16 km from Mauranipur. The maximum flood discharge of the dam is 1,744.07 m^{3}/s. Dam construction started in 1981. The Lakheri Dam irrigates 1,980 hectares of land in doab of Lakheri and Pathari river spread in 13 villages of Tehsil Garautha, through a main canal of 9.20 km and a distribution system of 21 km. The length and the height of the dam are 4,880 m and 10.6 m respectively. The dead storage capacity of the dam is 1.7 million cubic metres and live storage capacity is 13.9 million cubic metres.
- Lahchura Dam is located on Dhasan river, a tributary of river Betwa in Mauranipur Tehsil. It was renovated in 1910.

== Demographics ==
As of 2011 India census, Mauranipur had a population of 61,449. Males constitute 53% of the population and females 47%. Mauranipur has an average literacy rate of 76%, higher than the national average of 74%; male literacy is 79% and female literacy is 59%. In Mauranipur, 25% of the population is under 6 years of age. Mauranipur has 147 inhabited villages, 108 of which each have a population between 1,000 and 10,000 and 39 of which each have fewer than 1,000 residents. According to the 2011 census, Mauranipur's rural population is about 301,100 (158,300 males and 142,800 females). The great majority consider themselves Hindu; there are also about 18,000 Muslims, 1,400 Jains, 300 Christians, 70 Buddhists and 50 Sikhs.

== Culture ==
Faag songs and their rhythmic music can be heard in the whole Bundelkhand region during the spring season when the crops are ready for harvesting. Faag was enriched in the early twentieth century by folk poet Isuri (born 1881 in Mauranipur), who is credited with having composed over a thousand faags.

An annual festival is celebrated by a procession throughout the town of a deity of Rama, Krishna or Ganesh on a sedan cart, which is carried on people's shoulders. Before moving into the city the cart is first carried to the river Sukhnai for a deity-bathing ceremony. In this celebration a fair is arranged, called Jal Vihar, in which different types of devotional programs are celebrated for one month. Jal Vihar's celebration history dates back over 100 years ago; British government used to sanction funds for this celebration.

A statue of Tadka (an evil monster) is used to break an elephant in village Bhadanwara every year as ritual of native people first day of Navadurga of Winter, and a fair is also held as a ritual too.

Lathator Maharaj and Gudar badshah are two temples situated in Mauranipur. There are many story behind them. The Jal Vihar Mela is known for their Vihar. Lathator maharraj looks exactly same as sculpture in mathura.

== Tourist attractions ==
- Kedareshwar is situated on a hillock. There are 600 stone steps leading to the temple. It is a unique Shiva linga placed on the back of Vrashab —the Nandi of Lord Shivaa.
- Gairba village lies in Mauranipur Tehsil at a distance of around 19 km.north east. It has a small but fine temple apparently of great antiquity. The temple is situated at a small hill and is made of grey granite, the stones cut to required size but no mortar was used in construction. The architectural plan is simple but logically projected. It has three sections, each having its own roof rising in regular gradation. There is a badly mutilated basalt image said to be that of the Buddha in padmasana which bears an inscription on its base the date Samvat 1234 (1177 AD).
- Veera village in Mauranipur Tehsil, situated 13 km from Mauranipur, has a temple of Harsiddh Ma situated at the center of the village. This village holds a seven-day holy (Faag) celebration in which both Hindu and Muslims participate. The temple of goddess Harsiddh Ma is believed to fulfil devotees' wishes.
- Shri Digambar Jain Atishaya Chamatkari Kshetra is situated in Todi Fatehpur about 30 km from Mauranipur. This place is a vast temple in village - Todi Fatehpur; the temple has pinnacles attracting the pilgrims from a far distance. This Kshetra is about 600–700 years old. The principal deity Bhagwan Parshvanath's idol is installed in this temple. This temple is known as Bada (Big) Mandir (Temple).
- Kamla Sagar dam is about 6 km south-west of Mauranipur. The river Saprar has been dammed to form the Kamla Sagar reservoir, which covers an area about 10 km^{2}. There is an inspection house and a hill and a ruined fort which is said to have been the residence of the legendary thief Bona, a character of Alha.
- Basneh is on the Mauranipur-Gursarai Road. This place is associated with Bhasmasur, a demon king. Situated at the foot of the Vindhya hill range, there is a lake and an artificial waterfall. An inspection house is also available here.
- Gurha is a small village on the left bank of the Dhasau about 15 km south-east of Garantha, 88 km east of Jhansi and 8 km east of Markuan which lies on the road from Garantha to Mauranipur and from here one has to walk to reach the place. The Nagonath hill, a conspicuous landmark, lies a mile north-east of the village and on its crown, there are two old temples and a shrine of Mahadeo in a cave and at the foot of the hill on eastern side there is Chandella baithak. There is also an image of sage Vishvamitra, which lies submerged in the Dhasan. A fair is held here in the honour of the saint on the occasion of Makar Sankranti. Temple Maa bhadrakali shakti peeth is also situated in the village Bhadanwara and a fair is also held here every year in the Navadurga of winter.

== History ==
It is said that thousands of year ago, Mauranipur was under the kingdom of Bhoja. During 12th century, Mauranipur was under Chandela ruler Madanavarman (1129–1163). The credit for the development of Mauranipur goes to the Bundela kings. Mauranipur was a pargana under Rani Laxmi Bai rule. On 10 August 1857 Rani of Tehree occupied Mauranipur. Laxmi Bai suffered reverses in the beginning, but on 23 October, in battle with Tehree's forces, she emerged victorious. During the 1857 revolt against the British, Rani Laxmi Bai inflicted defeats on the British at Mauranipur and became the most powerful rebel leader of the 1857 revolution. Her army was further strengthened when the rulers of Banpur and Shahgarh in Bundelkhand became her allies. She fought valiantly against the attacks by British forces under Sir Sir Hugh Rose.

On 30 December 1951, Govind Ballabh Pant delivered a speech about the Zamindari Abolition Acts and the establishment of the five-year plan for agriculture in Mauranipur.

The town of Mauranipur has long been known for the manufacture of a red cloth called kharud, which is dyed from a root of the same name. The colour, once fixed by alum, is permanent.

== Politics ==
Mauranipur is a Vidhan Sabha (Legislative Assembly) constituency. This seat is reserved for members of Scheduled Castes.

Year	Winner Name	Vote%	Party	Runner-up Candidate	Vote%	Party
2022	Rashmi Arya	51.83	Apna dal (in collaboration with BJP)	tilak chandra ahirwar	30.68	Samajwadi Party
2017	Bhihari Lal Arya	98905	Bharatiya Janata Party	Rashmi Arya	81934	Samajwadi Party
2012	Rashmi Arya	29.1	Samajwadi Party	Rajendra Rahul	26.25	Bahujan Samaj Party
2007	Bhagwati Prasad Sagar	31.67	Bahujan Samaj Party	Bihari Lal Arya	24.32	Indian National Congress
2002	Pragi Lal Ahirwar	24.47	Bharatiya Janata Party	Bihari Lal Arya	22.9	Indian National Congress
1996	Bihari Lal Arya	37.69	Indian National Congress	Pragi Lal Ahirwar	36.98	Bharatiya Janata Party
1993	Bihari Lal Arya	40.3	Indian National Congress	Pragi Lal Ahirwar	35.39	Bharatiya Janata Party
1991	Pragi Lal Ahirwar	39.93	Bharatiya Janata Party	Bihari Lal Arya	39.81	Indian National Congress
1989	Pragi Lal Ahirwar	46.55	Bharatiya Janata Party	Bhagirath Choudhari	32.72	Indian National Congress
1985	Bhagirath Choudhari	51.35	Indian National Congress	Prem Narain Ahirwar	33.11	Bharatiya Janata Party
1980	Bhagirath Choudhari	59.17	Congress (I)	Har Das	22.79	Bharatiya Janata Party
1977	Prem Narain Ahirwar	45.09	Janata Party	Bhagirath Choudhari	43.88	

== Archaeological sites nearby ==
The following archaeological sites are near Mauranipur:

- Kedareswer temple : A divine place, situated on a hill in Roni, Mauranipur having Lord Shiva statue and few other statues also. Pt. Narendra Kumar Surothiya is the main priest of the temple.
- Shikhara-roofed temple called Marhia and dedicated to Gond baba - Khojra, Tehsil-Mauranipur
- Remains of a Chandella temple - Kisni Khurd, Tehsil-Mauranipur
- Chandel Temple - Pachwara (Gahras), Tehsil-Mauranipur
- Chandel Temple - Sakarar, Tehsil-Mauranipur
- Old Temple - Rora, Tehsil - Mauranipur
- Kusumadiya, Tehsil-Mauranipur
- Old Fort Bongada, Tehsil-Mauranipur
- Banjaron Ka Mandir, Syavari, Tehsil-Mauranipur
- Shivalaya, Basariya, 15 km from Mauranipur. It was built in the last days of Chandel rule.
- Champat Rai ka Mahal, Kachnev, Near Bangara, Tehsil-Mauranipur
- Maun Sadhana Kendra, Mauranipur
- It the most ancient temple of Mauranipur it is believed that it was founded by Raja bhoj. The temple of Lord Shiva with some small temples of other gods, known as Shri bade Mahadev mandir established at Shivganj in Mauranipur.

There is also another temple of lord Shiva at Shivganj known as Ramghat.

== Transport ==
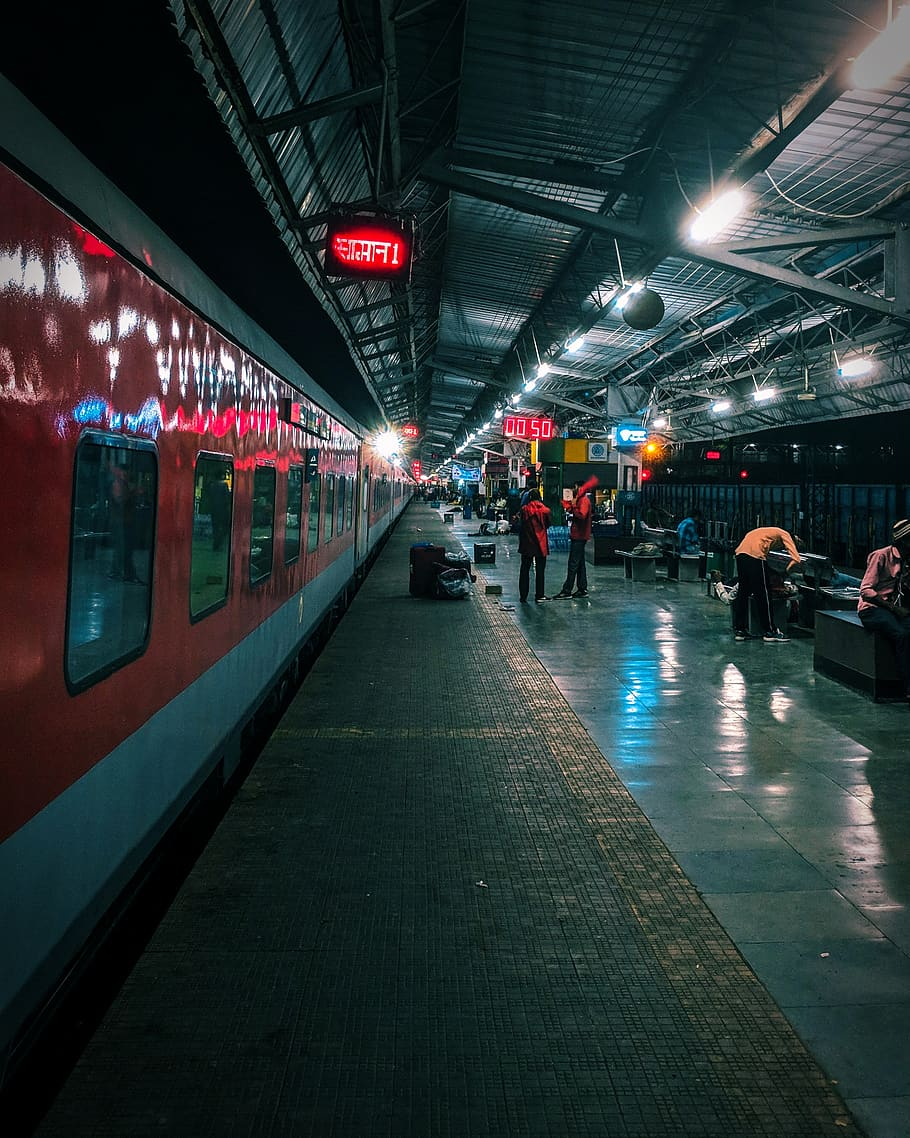
Mauranipur Railway station

Mauranipur is connected with three metro cities, Delhi, Kolkata and Mumbai, via Indian Railways network. Mauranipur is 466 km from Delhi via Rail and 485 km via Road. The Jhansi to Mauranipur and Mauranipur to Banda railway lines were built in 1889. Mauranipur is connected with other parts of India through National Highway 76. It is 65 km from Jhansi on the way to Khajuraho and 297 km from Lucknow.

=== Airports ===
- Jhansi Airport (Army aviation)
- Khajurho (Medium Type)
- Gwalior (Medium Type)

== Notable people ==
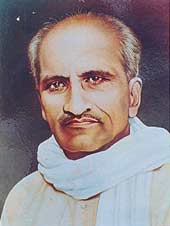
Vrindavan Lal Verma (1889–1969), an eminent Hindi novelist and playwright, was born at Mauranipur.He was honoured with Padma Bhushan for his literary works; Agra University presented him with honorary D. Lit. He received Soviet Land Nehru Award and the government India also awarded him for his novel, Jhansi Ki Rani.
