= Bangari, Uttar Pradesh =

Bangari
- Village
- Location in Uttar Pradesh, India Bangari (India)
- Coordinates: 25.840741°N 78.960168°E
- Country: India
- District: Jhansi

Government
  - Body: Gram panchayat

Languages
  - Official: Hindi
- Time zone: UTC+5:30 (IST)

Bangari is a village in Moth tehsil in Jhansi district of Uttar Pradesh State, India. The name Bangari is derived from "Bari", an area located about 1 km from the village. Around a century ago, the ancestors of the present-day villagers lived in Bari. Since Bari was a forested area, the population was shifted to the present-day Bangari village. The Bari area has a Durga temple, called the Raj Rajeswari Bari Bali Ma temple. Bangari is located 70 km north of the district headquarters Jhansi, 3 km from Samthar town and 10 km from Poonch town.
