= Ambabai, Jhansi =

Ambabai
- Village
- Location in Uttar Pradesh, India Ambabai (India)
- Coordinates: 25.3334°N 78.2935°E
- Country: India
- State: Uttar Pradesh
- District: Jhansi

Government
  - Body: Gram panchayat

Languages
  - Official: Hindi
- Time zone: UTC+5:30 (IST)
- PIN: 284001
- Vehicle registration: UP 93
- Website: up.gov.in

Ambabai Jhansi is a village in the Jhansi district of Uttar Pradesh, India.

== Demographics ==
As per census of 2011, there are 1137 families residing in Ambabai. The total population of Ambabai is 5815 out of which 3073 are males while 2742 are females. The average sex ratio of Ambabai village is 892 which is lower than the state average of 912. The literacy rate of Ambabai was 67.58% compared to 67.68% of Uttar Pradesh.
