= Tahrauli =

Coordinates: 25°33′06″N 78°59′45″E

Tahrauli is a major administrative sub-district (tehsil) located in the Jhansi district of Uttar Pradesh, India.

Tahrauli Fort was built in the 17th century, during the golden architectural reign of the Bundela clan.
