= Gadiya Gaon Jhansi =

Gadiya Gaon
- Village
- Location in Uttar Pradesh, India Gadiya Gaon (India)
- Coordinates: 25.4206°N 78.5249°E
- Country: India
- State: Uttar Pradesh
- District: Jhansi

Languages
  - Official: Hindi
- Time zone: UTC+5:30 (IST)
- PIN: 284003
- Vehicle registration: UP 93

Gadiya Gaon, also written Gariya Gaon, is a village in Jhansi district in Uttar Pradesh, India.
