= Bundelkhand Industrial Development Authority =

Statutory industrial development authority in Uttar Pradesh, India

Bundelkhand Industrial Development Authority - BIDA
- बुन्देलखण्ड औद्योगिक विकास प्राधिकरण
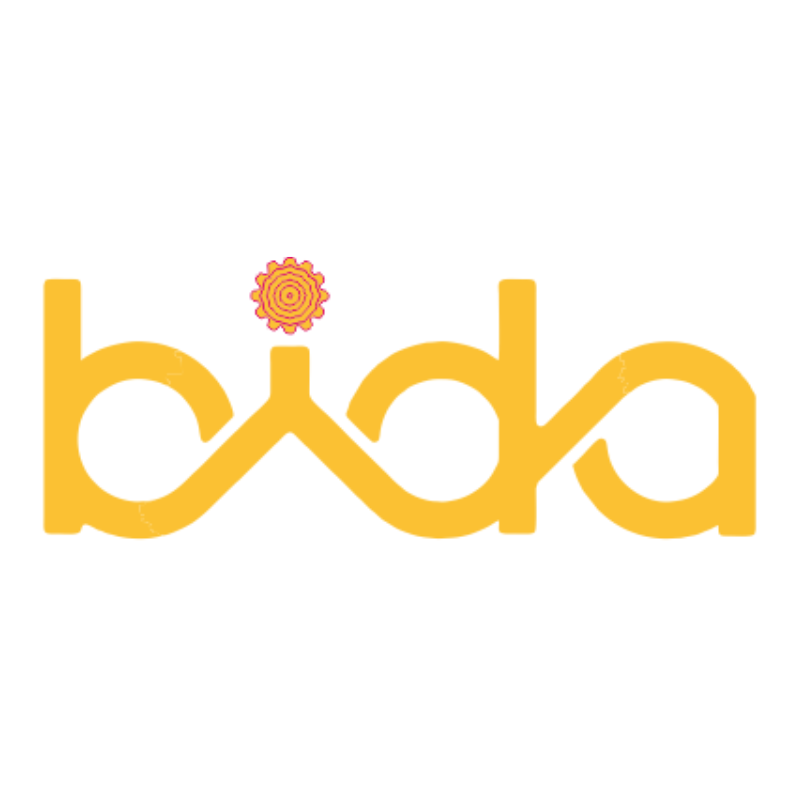
- Official logo of BIDA

Statutory industrial development and planning authority overview
- Formed: 14 September 2023; 3 years ago
- Jurisdiction: Government of Uttar Pradesh
- Headquarters: Block A, Kisan Bazar, Talpura, Jhansi, Uttar Pradesh 284001, India
- Statutory industrial development and planning authority executives: Bimal Kumar Dubey, IAS, Chairman; Sanjay Kumar Khatri, IAS, Chief Executive Officer; Praveen Verma, Additional Chief Executive Officer
- Parent department: Department of Infrastructure and Industrial Development
- Website: www.bida.co.in

Bundelkhand Industrial Development Authority - BIDA is a statutory industrial development and planning authority of the Government of Uttar Pradesh, headquartered in Jhansi. It was constituted under the Uttar Pradesh Industrial Area Development Act, 1976 to plan, develop and regulate an integrated industrial and urban township in the Bundelkhand region. BIDA is one of the industrial development authorities operating under the administrative umbrella of the state's Department of Infrastructure and Industrial Development.

The BIDA Master Plan 2045 covers 253.33 km^{2} (97.81 sq mi), equivalent to 62,599.20 acres, across 33 villages in Jhansi tehsil. This total planning area is distinct from the 56,662 acres approved for phased land acquisition and development. The planned city combines industrial, residential, commercial, institutional, logistics and green uses. In June 2026, the Union Ministry of Environment, Forest and Climate Change granted environmental clearance to the greenfield industrial-city proposal.

== History ==
The Uttar Pradesh cabinet approved the proposal to establish BIDA in 2023. The initial programme included a ₹5,000 crore land-purchase fund and was widely described as a Noida-like industrial-city project intended to accelerate industrialisation in Bundelkhand. The Governor of Uttar Pradesh formally notified the BIDA area on 14 September 2023.

The authority held its first board meeting on 4 January 2024 and its second on 28 June 2024. In January 2024, BIDA invited bids for preparation of a vision document and Master Plan 2045. A consortium led by Singapore-based Surbana Jurong and real-estate consultancy CBRE was subsequently selected to prepare the plan.

The draft Master Plan 2045 was released for public objections and suggestions on 11 April 2025, followed by draft Building Regulations 2045 on 26 April 2025. By October 2025, the master plan had received BIDA board approval, while sector and zonal planning continued. The environmental appraisal process included an Expert Appraisal Committee review in June 2025, a public hearing in Jhansi on 22 December 2025 and further committee reviews in March and April 2026. Environmental clearance was reported in June 2026.

== Planning area and Master Plan 2045 ==
BIDA's notified planning area covers 33 revenue villages in Jhansi tehsil. The authority's planning documents describe a greenfield city intended to integrate industrial districts with housing, commercial centres, education and health facilities, transport infrastructure, utilities and existing rural settlements.

=== Constituent villages ===
The notified villages are in Jhansi Sadar tehsil and fall within the Babina and Baragaon development blocks. The Draft Master Plan 2045 lists the following 33 villages:

- Ambabai
- Kalothra
- Sarmau
- Simra
- Gevra
- Amarpur
- Bachhauni
- Badanpur
- Bajna
- Bamair
- Baruapura
- Basai
- Baidora
- Chamaraua
- Dagarwaha
- Dhikouli
- Domagor
- Dongri
- Gagauni
- Gurha
- Imiliya
- Khaira
- Khajraha Buzurg
- Khajraha Khurd
- Kilchvara Buzurg
- Kilchvara Khurd
- Kotkhera
- Math
- Murari
- Parasai
- Punawali Kalan
- Rajapur
- Rampura

=== Land-use framework ===
Selected allocations in the revised master-plan framework reported with the 2026 environmental clearance are shown below. The figures do not constitute the entire land-use schedule; the balance includes commercial, mixed-use and public-institutional uses.

Selected proposed land uses
Land-use category	Area	Share of planning area
Industrial	83.66 km^{2} (32.30 sq mi)	33.02%
New residential areas	37.40 km^{2} (14.44 sq mi)	approximately 14.8%
Existing rural settlements	5.40 km^{2} (2.08 sq mi)	approximately 2.1%
Green and recreational areas	63.13 km^{2} (24.37 sq mi)	24.92%
Transport and logistics	29.30 km^{2} (11.31 sq mi)	approximately 11.6%

The draft plan has included proposals for a central business and mixed-use district, industrial clusters, educational and skill-development facilities, healthcare, tourism and convention facilities, water bodies and a waterfront near Dongri Dam. Proposed target sectors have included agro and food processing, textiles, defence equipment, electronics and semiconductors, data centres, electric vehicles, pharmaceuticals, renewable energy, logistics and information technology.

=== Environmental and utility planning ===
The revised plan reserves 24.92% of the project area for green and recreational uses. It includes a 50-metre (160 ft) green belt along the project boundary and a 150-metre (490 ft) green belt around Dongri Dam. The environmental-clearance proposal uses a zero liquid discharge framework. It envisages meeting a drinking-water requirement of 217.22 million litres per day from Rajghat Dam, developing sewage-treatment capacity of 163.26 million litres per day and common-effluent-treatment capacity of 150.88 million litres per day in phases, and reusing treated water rather than discharging wastewater into the Betwa, Pahuj or Angauri rivers.

Project documents associated with the clearance estimated total investment at ₹1,51,571 crore and employment for more than 560,000 people. These are project-stage estimates reported by the authority, not realised investment or employment figures.

== Governance and administration ==
BIDA is governed by a Board of Directors and administered by a chief executive officer. The authority's board brings together senior officials responsible for state finance, electricity, urban development, industrial development, public works, industrial-area development, water infrastructure, district administration and town planning.

=== Leadership ===
As of July 2026, the authority's official website listed the following senior office-holders:

Office	Office-holder
Chairman	Bimal Kumar Dubey, IAS
Chief Executive Officer	Sanjay Kumar Khatri, IAS
Additional Chief Executive Officer	Praveen Verma

=== Board of Directors ===
As of July 2026, BIDA's official Board of Directors page listed the following members and offices. Because most seats are held ex officio, the membership changes when the relevant state or district postings change.

Member	Office or representation listed by BIDA
Deepak Kumar	Additional Chief Secretary, Finance
Ashish Kumar Goel	Chairman, Uttar Pradesh Power Corporation Limited
Amrit Abhijat	Principal Secretary, Urban Development
Alok Kumar	Additional Chief Secretary, Infrastructure and Industrial Development; Information Technology and Electronics
Ajay Chauhan	Principal Secretary, Public Works Department
Mayur Maheshwari	Chief Executive Officer, Uttar Pradesh State Industrial Development Authority; Chief Executive Officer, Lucknow Industrial Development Authority
Raj Shekhar	Managing Director, Uttar Pradesh Jal Nigam (Rural)
Ramakant Pandey	In-charge Managing Director, Uttar Pradesh Jal Nigam (Urban)
Bimal Kumar Dubey	Chairman, BIDA; Divisional Commissioner, Jhansi
Gaurang Rathi	District Magistrate, Jhansi
Anil Kumar Mishra	Chief Town and Country Planner, Uttar Pradesh

The organisational structure places planning, civil engineering, electrical and mechanical engineering, finance, land acquisition, information systems, public health, horticulture, legal and compliance functions under the CEO and additional CEO, with officers on special duty assigned to groups of departments.

== Land acquisition and implementation ==
The master-plan boundary of 62,599.20 acres is broader than the land-acquisition programme. In February 2026, the state government was reported to have formally approved 56,662 acres for phased acquisition and development, including a first-phase target of 35,298 acres and a second-phase target of 21,364 acres.

Reported acquisition totals have increased as follows. They are dated progress snapshots and may use somewhat different cut-off dates or classifications of private and government land.

Report date	Land reported as acquired	Source
May 2025	17,840 acres	
October 2025	22,028 acres	
March 2026	24,201 acres	
June 2026	25,706 acres	

BIDA has developed a Land Acquisition Management System (LAMS) to digitise plot maps, acquisition-stage monitoring, ownership and family-tree analysis, asset valuation, encroachment detection, litigation tracking and management-information reports. It has also procured an enterprise geographic-information-system and management-information-system platform for planning and administration.

=== Activation area ===
BIDA commissioned feasibility studies, engineering designs and detailed project reports for an initial activation area under Master Plan 2045. In June 2026, CEO Sanjay Kumar Khatri said that approximately 2,500 acres around Dagarwaha, Rajapur and Bamer villages would form the first activation area, combining industrial plots with housing, education and other civic facilities.

== Proposed infrastructure and development projects ==
The authority has sought consultants, developers or operators for several proposed components of the industrial city. Its tender archive includes expressions of interest for a mixed-use city, an education city, a skill-development centre, a 600-bed multispeciality hospital and studies to identify long-term freshwater sources. These procurements and expressions of interest represent planned or preparatory work and do not by themselves establish that the facilities have been built.

At a state-government review in October 2025, proposed regional-connectivity projects included an airport, a railway station and a multimodal logistics park within the BIDA area; a link to the Bundelkhand Expressway; possible extension of the Agra–Gwalior Greenfield Expressway towards Jhansi; and additional capacity on the Delhi–Chennai railway route. The master plan also provides for internal roads, public transport, freight management, drainage, sewerage, solid-waste management, electricity distribution and digital urban-management systems.

The authority has promoted manufacturing and service sectors including food processing, textiles, defence and aerospace, engineering, automobiles and electric vehicles, electronics and semiconductors, data centres, pharmaceuticals, logistics, renewable energy, information technology, tourism and associated urban services. Reports in 2025 and 2026 referred to proposals or expressions of interest from public-sector and logistics organisations, including BEML and the Container Corporation of India, but such proposals were at differing stages and should not be treated as completed investments.

== Public response ==
The Uttar Pradesh government has presented BIDA as a means of diversifying industrial investment beyond western Uttar Pradesh and generating employment in a region affected by limited industrialisation and outward migration. Supporters have also pointed to Jhansi's position near national road and rail corridors, the Bundelkhand Expressway and the Jhansi node of the Uttar Pradesh Defence Industrial Corridor.

The project has also drawn concerns over land acquisition, compensation and the distribution of its eventual benefits. Opposition politicians have argued that compensation in Bundelkhand is lower than in western Uttar Pradesh and have sought stronger guarantees that affected residents will share in employment and development gains. The environmental-clearance framework states that existing rural settlements are to be integrated into the planned city and provided with parks, health centres, educational institutions and skill-development facilities.

== See also ==
- Noida
- Greater Noida Industrial Development Authority
- Uttar Pradesh State Industrial Development Corporation
- Uttar Pradesh Defence Industrial Corridor
- Bundelkhand Expressway
