= Palra, Jhansi =

Palra
- Village
- Location in Uttar Pradesh, India Palra (India)
- Coordinates: 25.25453°N 79.05115°E
- Country: India
- State: Uttar Pradesh
- District: Jhansi
- Tehsil: Mau Ranipur
- Block: Bangra

Population (2021)
  - Total: 4,801

Languages
  - Official: Hindi
- Time zone: UTC+5:30 (IST)
- PIN: 284205

Palra is a village of Bangra Block, Mau Ranipur Tehsil, Jhansi district, in the state of Uttar Pradesh. It is located in the Bangra block of Jhansi. Bangara is 50 km from the district headquarters, namely, Jhansi on NH-76. The village of Palra is located 3 km to the north. The predominant caste is Thakur. Kuswaha and Dhobi are the other major groups who reside here. From palra village there is famous historical temple GAIRAHA TEMPLE which is coming under ASI and good place to see.

== Demographics ==
As of the 2021 Census, the population of this village was 4801, including 2588 males and 2213 females. Palra is also a gram panchayat and nayay panchayat. Currently, Gram pradhan is Mohan kushwaha . palra is one of the biggest gram panchayat of bangara block after magarpur and it has 2 BDC seats for kheshtra panchayat bangara.

== Overview ==
Transit is available for travel from Bangara to Palra. Taxis and Autos Maruthi are available. Bangra is well connected by bus from Jhansi and Mauranipur.

There is a branch post office located in Palra. Its pincode is 284205. Punjab National Bank has a branch in the Bangra which is a block headquarters near palra. Nearest ATM is in Bangra (PNB) 3 km and in Mauranipur (SBI) 18 km
