= Khatikyana (Jhansi) =

Village in Uttar Pradesh, India

- Area
- Location in Uttar Pradesh, India Khatikyana (Jhansi) (India)
- Coordinates: 25.463898°N 78.582885°E
- Country: India
- State: Uttar Pradesh
- District: Jhansi

Government
  - Type: Panchayat raj
  - Body: Gram panchayat
- Elevation: 620 m (2,030 ft)

Population (2011)
  - Total: 25,000
- Sex ratio 1000/992 ♂/♀

Languages
  - Official: Hindi
- Time zone: UTC+5:30 (IST)

Khatikyana is a village in Jhansi district of Uttar Pradesh state, India. Popular in India for Khatikyane ki Kaali Maata. It is just 1.7 kilometers from Jhansi fort and 4.6 kilometers from Jhansi railway junction.

== Temples & events ==
Khatikyana is famous for Khatikyane Ki Kaali Maata and "The Kaali Visarjan Mahotsav" celebrated by Hindu Khatik people, which organised by "Sri Sri 1008 Mahakali Utsav Samiti, Khatik Samaj" every year on the occasion of Hindu festival Dussehra where lacs of people come across India to watch and celebrate the event.
