= List of educational institutions in Jhansi =

Jhansi is a major hub of education of Bundelkhand region of India; in the states of Uttar Pradesh and Madhya Pradesh. This article provides listing of educational institutions in Jhansi city.

== Universities ==
Bundelkhand University, based in Jhansi, was formed on 26 August 1975 in Jhansi to cater for higher education in Bundelkhand. Since then the university has become a big campus with various other affiliated colleges, and a plethora of courses available.

- Rani Laxmi Bai Central Agricultural University (founded 2013)

== Bundelkhand College Jhansi (Estb: 1949) ==
- Bundelkhand Institute of Engineering & Technology
- Maharani Laxmi Bai Medical College
- Bipin Bihari Degree College(ESTB: 1959), Jhansi
- Chandra Shekhar Azad Institute Of Science And Technology
- College of Science & Engineering, Jhansi

== Schools ==
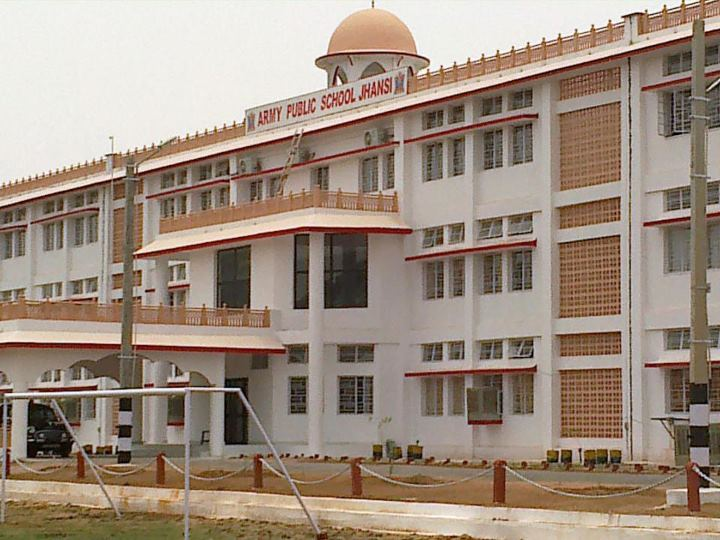
Army School, Jhansi Cantt

- Army Public School, Jhansi
- Bhani Devi Goyal Saraswati Vidhya Mandir Inter College
- Christ the King College
- Allen House School
- Blue Bells Public School, Jhansi
- Cathedral College, Jhansi
- Don Bosco, Jhansi
- DPS Jhansi
- Government Inter College, Jhansi
- Gyan Sthali Public School
- Hansraj Modern Public School
- Jai Academy
- Kendriya Vidyalaya No.2, Jhansi (Rana Pratap Marg, Jhansi Cantt, Jhansi)
- Kendriya Vidyalaya No.3, Jhansi (Near St. Martin Church, Cariappa Marg, Jhansi Cantt, Jhansi)
- Kendriya Vidyalaya No.4, Jhansi (Gulam Gaus Marg, Railway Colony(W), Jhansi)
- Margaret Leask Memorial English School, Jhansi
- Modern Public School, Jhansi
- Mount Litera Zee School, Jhansi
- RNS World School, Jhansi
- Rani Laxmibai Group of Public Schools
- Sainik School, Jhansi
- St. Mark's College, Jhansi
- St. Francis College, Jhansi
- St. Umar Inter College, Jhansi
- Sun International School, Jhansi

== See also ==
- Jhansi § Education
