= Jhansi district =

Coordinates: 25°30′N 78°30′E

- District of Uttar Pradesh
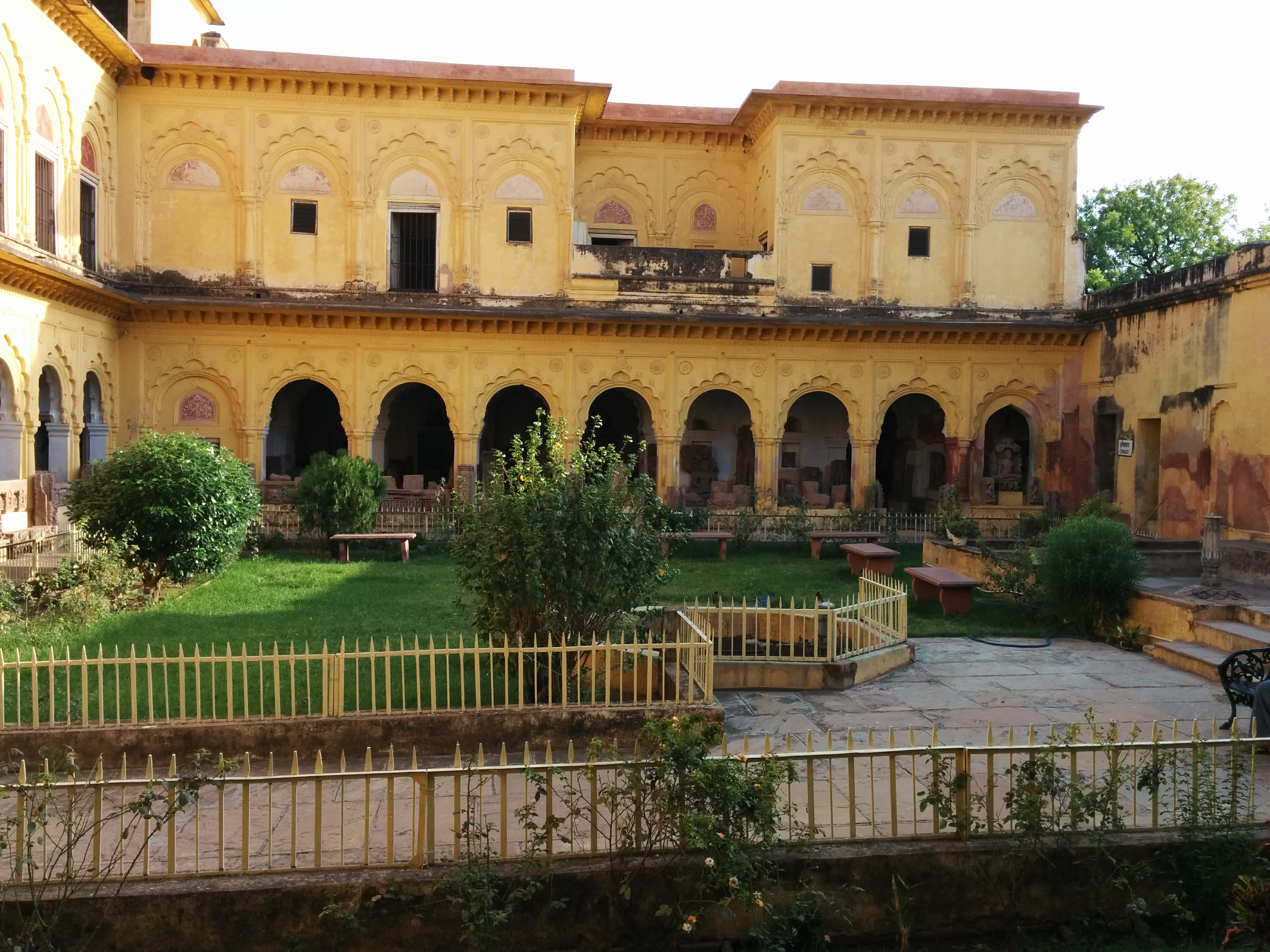
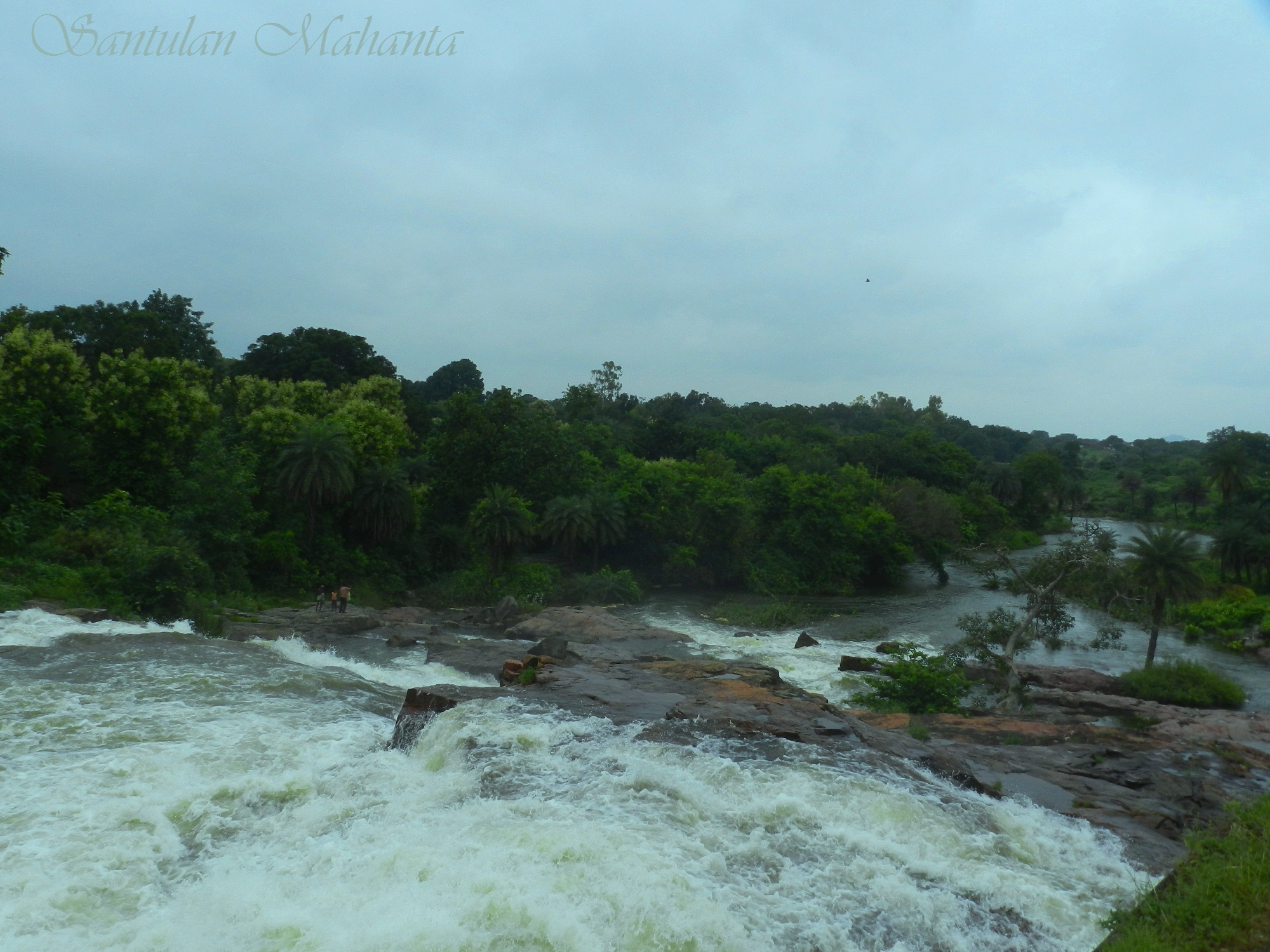
- Top: Rani Mahal in Jhansi; Bottom: Barua Sagar Tal

- Location of Jhansi district in Uttar Pradesh
- Country: India
- State: Uttar Pradesh
- Division: Jhansi
- Headquarters: Jhansi
- Tehsils: 1. Jhansi, 2. Mauranipur, 3. Moth, 4.Tehroli, 5.Garautha

Government
  - Lok Sabha constituencies: Jhansi

Area
  - Total: 5,024 km^{2} (1,940 sq mi)

Population (2011)
  - Total: 1,998,603
  - Density: 397.8/km^{2} (1,030/sq mi)
  - Urban: 833,484

Demographics
  - Literacy: 75.05%
  - Sex ratio: 890
- Time zone: UTC+05:30 (IST)
- Website: jhansi.nic.in

Jhansi district is one of the districts of Uttar Pradesh state in northern India. The city of Jhansi is the district headquarters. The district is bordered on the north by Jalaun District, to the east by Hamirpur and Mahoba districts, to the south by Tikamgarh District of Madhya Pradesh state, to the southwest by Lalitpur District, which is joined to Jhansi District by a narrow corridor, and on the east by the Datia and Bhind districts of Madhya Pradesh. Population 19,98,603 (2011 census). Lalitpur District, which extends into the hill country to the south, was added to Jhansi District in 1891, and made a separate district again in 1974.

== History ==
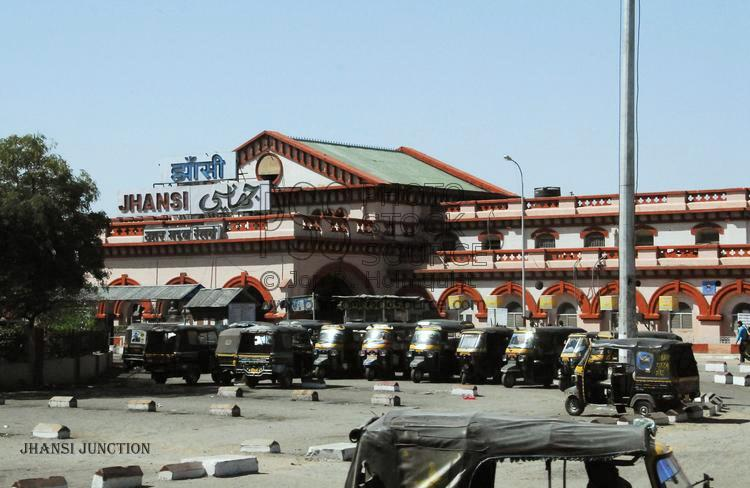
Jhansi Junction railway station

In 1861 the city of Jhansi and a dependent territory was ceded to Gwalior State and the capital of the district was moved to Jhansi-Nawabad (Jhansi Re-founded), a village without "cantonment" (military camp). Jhansi (the old city) became the capital of a "subah" (provínce) within the state of Gwalior, but in 1886 was returned to British rule as a district of the United Provinces of Agra and Oudh in exchange for the Gwalior Fort and the cantonment of Morar nearby. (It had been given to the Maharaja of Gwalior, but came under British rule in 1886 as the result of a territorial swap.) The population of Jhansi in 1901 was about 55,000 while Jhansi district's population had been about 407,000 in 1891.

Under the Mughal Empire at the time of Akbar, the area of today's Jhansi district was part of the sarkar of Erachh in Agra Subah. The area was part of the mahals of Erachh, Bhander, Bijpur, Jhansi, "Pandor" (i.e. Pandwaha), and Jhatra. Jhatra consisted of 4 mahals grouped together.

== Geography ==
Several railway lines serve the district. South of Jhansi District lies the hill country of Bundelkhand, which slopes down from the Vindhya Range. The district consists of the level plain of Bundelkhand, distinguished for its deep black soil, known as mar, and admirably adapted for the cultivation of cotton. The district is intersected or bounded by three principal rivers, the Pahuj, Betwa and Dhasan.

The main city in Jhansi district is Jhansi. Other towns are Mauranipur, Garautha, Moth, Babina, Chirgaon, Samthar, Gursarai, Erich, etc.

== Demographics ==
Historical population
Year	Pop.	±% p.a.
1901	426,875	—
1911	468,327	+0.93%
1921	421,828	−1.04%
1931	477,544	+1.25%
1941	535,878	+1.16%
1951	565,933	+0.55%
1961	714,484	+2.36%
1971	870,138	+1.99%
1981	1,137,031	+2.71%
1991	1,429,698	+2.32%
2001	1,744,931	+2.01%
2011	1,998,603	+1.37%

Religions in Jhansi district (2011)
Religion	Percent
Hinduism	91.26%
Islam	7.40%
Other or not stated	1.34%
Distribution of religions

According to the 2011 census Jhansi district has a population of 1,998,603, roughly equal to the nation of Slovenia or the US state of New Mexico. This gives it a ranking of 231st in India (out of a total of 640). The district has a population density of 398 inhabitants per square kilometre (1,030/sq mi) . Its population growth rate over the decade 2001-2011 was 14.54%. Jhansi has a sex ratio of 890 females for every 1000 males, and a literacy rate of 69.68%. 41.70% of the population lives in urban areas. Scheduled Castes and Scheduled Tribes make up 28.14% and 0.19% of the population respectively.

Languages of Jhansi district (2011)
1. Hindi (95.3%)
2. Bundeli (3.36%)
3. Others (1.29%)

At the time of the 2011 Census of India, 95.35% of the population in the district spoke Hindi and 3.36% Bundeli as their first language.

== District at a Glance ==
=== Tehsil ===
There are 5 tehsil in district Jhansi:

1. Jhansi
2. Mauranipur
3. Garautha
4. Tehroli
5. Moth

=== Development Blocks ===
There are 8 Development Blocks:

1. Babina
2. Badagaon
3. Bamaur
4. Bangra
5. Chirgaon
6. Gursarai
7. Mauranipur
8. Moth

=== Constituencies ===
There are 4 constituencies in Jhansi District:

1. 222 – Babina
2. 223 – Jhansi Nagar
3. 224 – Mauranipur
4. 225 – Garautha

== Villages ==
- Ambabai
- Bangari
- Gadiya Gaon
- Gonti
- Khatikyana
- Palra
