= Government Polytechnic Jhansi =

Coordinates: 25.4743°N 78.5572°E

The Government Polytechnic Jhansi is a college affiliated with the Uttar Pradesh Board of Technical Education, and approved by All India Council for Technical Education. Its principal is Naveen kumar, and it is situated on Gwalior road near the Kanpur barrier. There are five engineering courses at the college: Electronics Engineering, Mechanical Engineering (auto), Mechanical Engineering (pro), Civil Engineering, and Electrical Engineering.

On the 'Karam BhumiI ' of Maharani Laxmi Bai, popularly known as 'Jhansi Ki Rani' the foundation of the polytechnic was laid down in 1958. The institute is situated on the Jhansi Gwalior Road. Jhansi the head of 'Bundelkhand' region is an historical and industrial city. The institute started its academic session in the disciplines of Civil, Electrical and Mechanical Engineering. In 1971 the institute started a diploma course in Automobile Engineering, in 1972 a diploma course in Electronics Engineering and in 1993 a diploma in Computer Applications. The annual intakes are 30, 30,30,40,30 and 40 respectively.

The Diploma certificate is given by the Board of Technical Education, U.P Lucknow.

The institute has an administrative building, an academic building, hostel, N.C.C blocks, and playground.

It is situated at Gwalior Road Jhansi near Asharam Ashram. The distance from the railway station and bus stand is 5 km.
