= Jhansi Railway Settlement =

Jhansi Railway Settlement Jhansi Rly. Settlement
- Town
- Location in Uttar Pradesh, India Jhansi Railway Settlement (India)
- Coordinates: 25°26′N 78°33′E
- Country: India
- State: Uttar Pradesh
- District: Jhansi

Population (2001)
  - Total: 13,602

Language
  - Official: Hindi
  - Additional official: Urdu
- Time zone: UTC+5:30 (IST)
- Vehicle registration: UP
- Website: up.gov.in

Jhansi Rly. Settlement is a town in Jhansi district in the Indian state of Uttar Pradesh.

== Demographics ==
As of 2011 Indian Census, Jhansi Railway Settlement had a total population of 13,602, of which 7,226 were males and 6,376 were females. Population within the age group of 0 to 6 years was 1,168. The total number of literates in Jhansi Railway Settlement was 10,754, which constituted 79.1% of the population with male literacy of 84.0% and female literacy of 74.4%. The effective literacy rate of 7+ population of Jhansi Railway Settlement was 86.5%, of which male literacy rate was 92.1% and female literacy rate was 80.2%. The Scheduled Castes and Scheduled Tribes population was 3,373 and 38 respectively. Jhansi Railway Settlement had 30460 households in 2011.
