= Palra (Hamirpur) =

Village in Uttar Pradesh, India

Coordinates: 25°48′23″N 80°06′01″E

Palra is a village in Hamirpur Tehsil, Hamirpur district, Uttar Pradesh, India.

It is situated 20 km away from Hamirpur, which is both the district and sub-district headquarters of Palra. As per 2009 stats, Palra village is also a gram panchayat. The total geographical area of the village is 525.36 hectares.

According to the 2011 Census of India, Palra has a total population of 1,177; 640 are male and 537 female. The literacy rate is 72.1%, 84.39% for males and 57.85% for females. There are about 223 houses in the village. The pincode is 210341 and the location or village code is 153745.

Nearby villages include:

- Atrar
- Banda
- Bank
- Banki
- Chandauli Jar
- Ingohata
- Nadehra
- Ragaura
- Vidokhar Medni
- Vidokhar Purai
