= Garautha =

- Nagar Panchayat
- Location in Uttar Pradesh, India
- Coordinates: 25.57°N 79.3°E
- Country: India
- State: Uttar Pradesh
- District: Jhansi
- Elevation: 153 m (502 ft)

Population (2011)
  - Total: 10,807

Languages
  - Official: Hindi
- Time zone: UTC+5:30 (IST)

Garautha is a Tehsil and a Nagar Panchayat city in district of Jhansi, Uttar Pradesh. The Garautha City is divided into ten wards for which elections are held every five years. Garautha is 80 and 36 km away from Jhansi and Tahrauli. There is also tehseel headquarter. Garautha is a largest Tahseel of Jhansi District. There are some religious places near Garautha as Jharkhand dham, Hanuman mandir, lathator dham ashram.

== Geography ==
Garautha is located at 25.57°N 79.3°E. It has an average elevation of 153 metres (501 feet). The city of Garautha is situated on the banks of Lakheri River.

== Demographics ==
The Garautha Tehsil as per Census 2011 has a population of 233,688 of which 124,934 are males and 108,754 are females.

The Garautha Nagar Panchayat has population of 10,807 of which 5,682 are males while 5,125 are females as per report released by Census India 2011. Literacy rate of Garautha Nagar Panchayat is 80.67% higher than state average of 67.68%.

== Education ==
Education institute providing educations from elementary to graduate degrees are available and functioning in Garautha. The degree colleges at Garautha are affiliated to Bundelkhand University and Schools are affiliated to UP Board and CBSE Board.

=== Schools ===
1. Kanya Inter College, Garautha
2. Kher Inter College, Gursarai
3. Dr. Vijay Foundation School, Garautha
4. Akhandanand Janta Inter College School, Garautha
5. St. Mary's, Gursarai jhansi
6. Jay hind mishon inter college Garautha (Jhansi)

=== Colleges ===
1. Motibai Rajaram Mahavidyalaya (MBR College)
2. Dr Ram Manohar Lohiya Mahila Mahavidyalaya, Gursarai
3. Bhagwati Industrial Training Institute (BITI)

== Politics ==
=== Local politics view ===
In Present time (2023), Shri Arun Kumar Mishra is Chairmain of Garautha.

Garautha is a Vidhan Sabha (Legislative Assembly) Constituency.

Garautha, Jhansi, Uttar Pradesh - Vidhan Sabha Election
S.No	Year	Winner Name	Party	Runner - Up Name	Runner-Up Party
1	1951	Ram Sahai	INC	Vishwa Nath Singh	IND
2	1957	Lachman Rao Kadam	INC	Prem Narayan Tiwari	IND
3	1962	Kashi Prasad Dwedi	INC	Kanhaiya Lal	PSP
4	1967	Kanhaiya Lal	BJS	Kashi Prasad Dwedi	INC
5	1969	Atma Ram Govind Kher	INC	Bhagwan Das	BKD
6	1974	Ranjit Singh Judev	INC	Kanhaiya Lal	BJS
7	1977	Ranjit Singh Judev	INC	Vishwa Nath Singh	JNP
8	1980	Ranjit Singh Judev	INC	Kunwar Manvendra Singh	BJP
9	1985	Kunwar Manvendra Singh	BJP	Ranjit Singh Judev	INC
10	1989	Ranjit Singh Judev	INC	Kunwar Manvendra Singh	BJP
11	1991	Ranjit Singh Judev	INC	Veerendra Niranjan	BJP
12	1993	Ranjit Singh Judev	INC	Chandrapal Singh	SP
13	1996	Chandrapal Singh	SP	Ranjit Singh Judev	INC
14	2002	Brijendra Kumar Vyas	BSP	Chandrapal Singh	SP
15	2007	Deep Naryan Yadav	SP	Ranjit Singh Judev	INC
16	2012	Deep Naryan Yadav	SP	Devesh Paliwal	BSP
17	2017	Jawahar Lal Rajpoot	BJP	Deep Naryan Yadav	SP
18	2022	Jawahar Lal Rajpoot	BJP	Deep Naryan Yadav	SP

== Famous Hindu Temple ==
1. Shiv Ashram Nadi Par
2. Shri Hanuman Gadi Temple
3. Shri Giddavashni Temple
4. Shri Balaji Sarkar Temple, main bazar
5. Shri Rajgaund sarkar Temple, chhota Garautha
6. maa Bhadrakali shaktipeeth Dhaam chhota Garautha
7. Maa Gayatri Tample; Gayatri Nagar garautha
