= Dhasan River =

River in Bundelkhand

- Map of the rivers and lakes in India

- Location of the mouth in India

Location
- Country: India
- State: Madhya Pradesh
- Region: Central India Bundelkhand

Physical characteristics
- Mouth: Betwa River
  - coordinates: 25°29′N 79°14′E

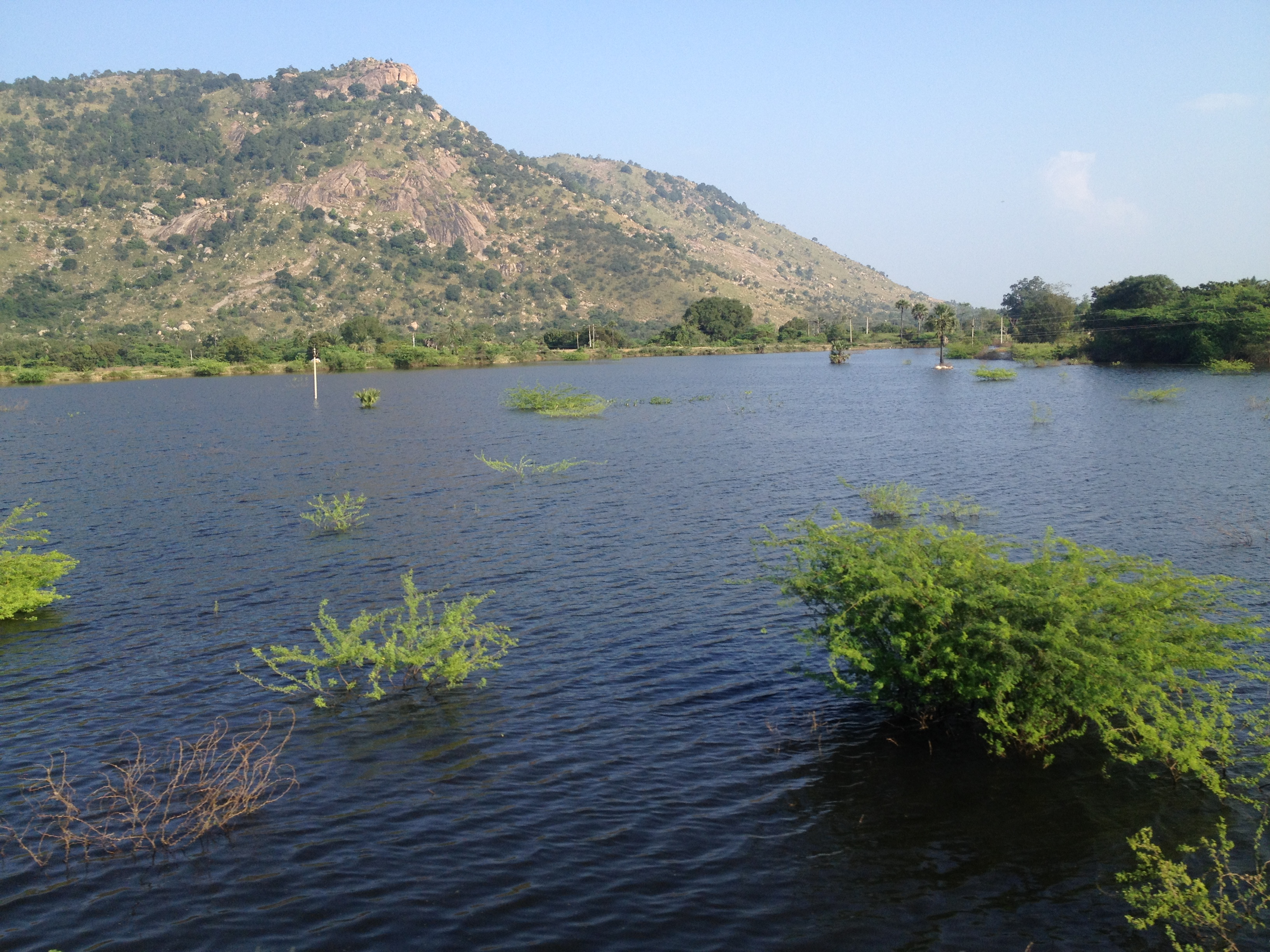
Dhasan River

The Dhasan River is a river in central India. A right bank tributary of the Betwa River. It flows in the Bundelkhand region of Madhya Pradesh and Uttar Pradesh.

== Origin and length ==
Dhasan River originates in Begumganj tehsil (Raisen district, Madhya Pradesh). And then flows in Sagar District .

The river forms the southeastern boundary of the Lalitpur District of Uttar Pradesh state. Its total length is 365km, out of which 240km lies in Madhya Pradesh, 54km common boundary between Madhya Pradesh and Uttar Pradesh, and 71km lies in Uttar Pradesh.

== Tributaries ==
Kathan, Mangrar, Bachneri, Sukhanai, and Rohni are among its tributaries.

== Human activity ==
Two dams have been built on Dhasan: one at Pahari Ban Sujara Dam and one further down at Ghat Lahchura Dam. A three-branched irrigational canal was opened in 1910, diverting some of the river's flow and providing water for the Bundelkhand region.

The river was known as the Dasharna in ancient times. Residents of nearby villages regard this river as a holy river.

== See also ==
- River basins in Madhya Pradesh
