= Jhansi =

Metropolis in Uttar Pradesh, India

- Metropolis
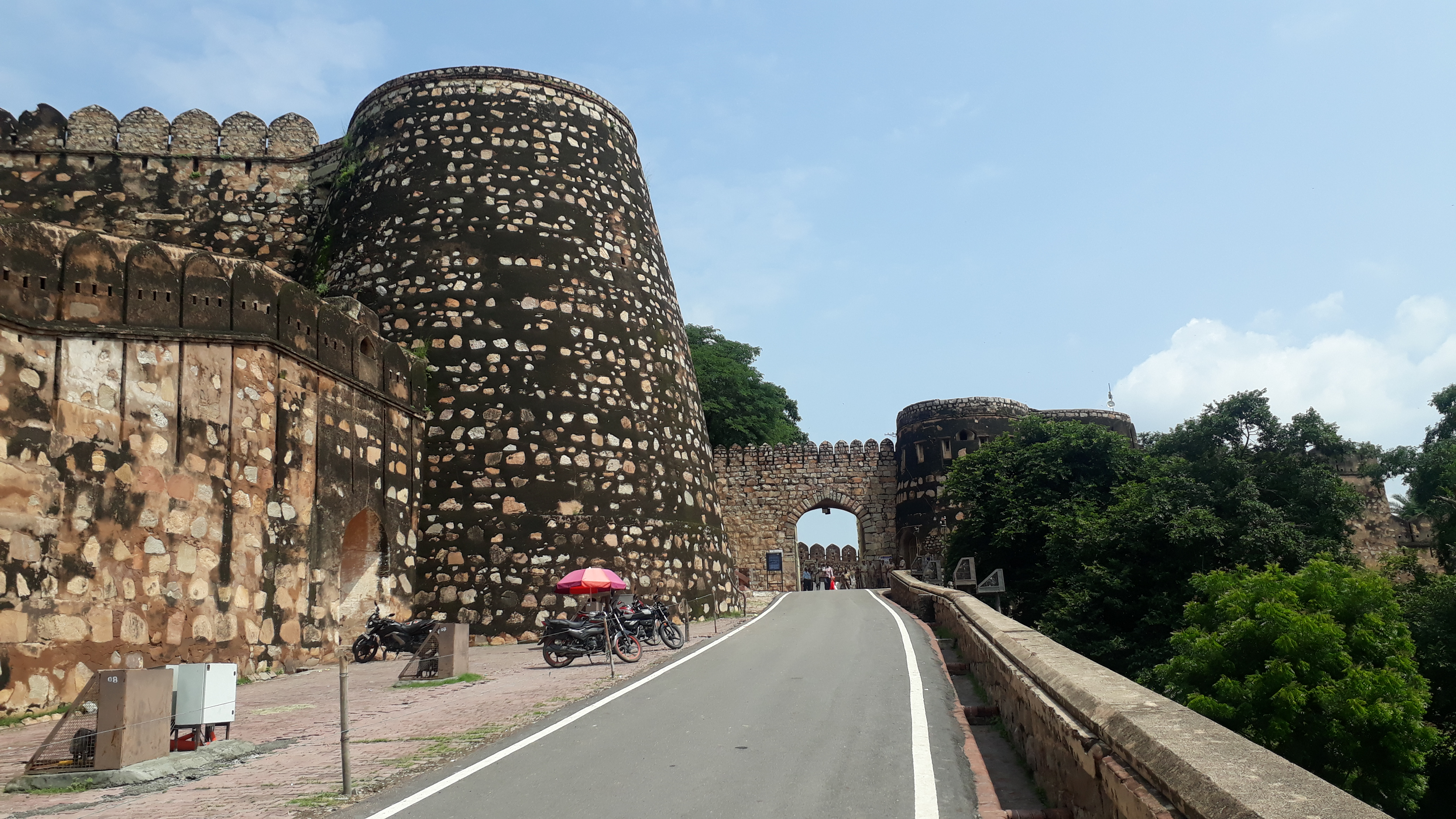
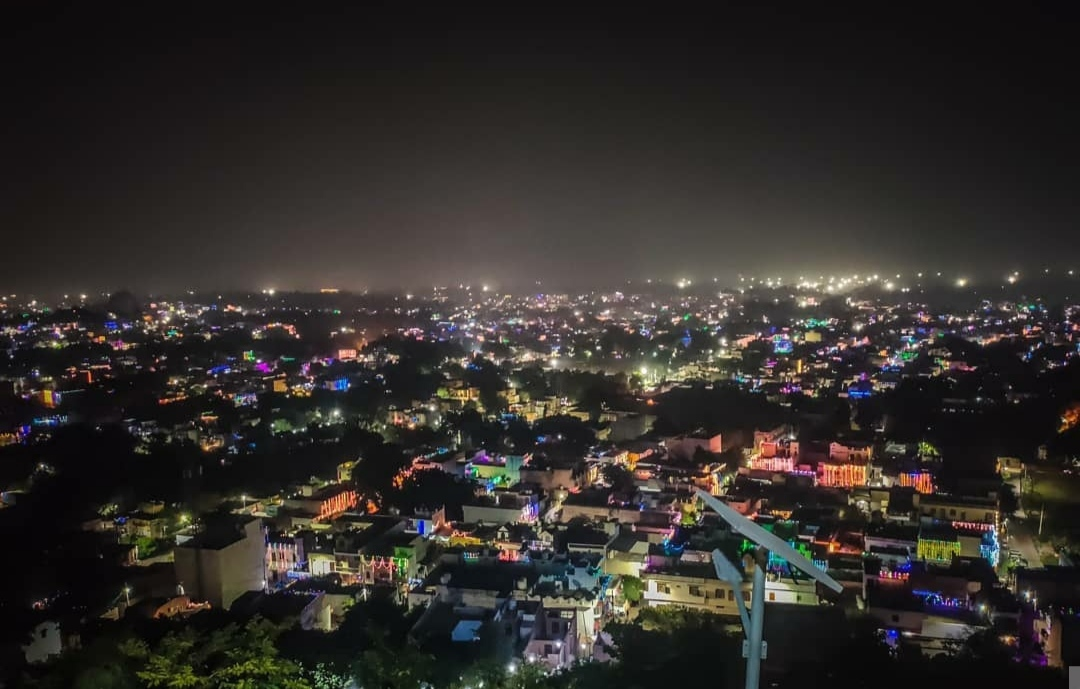
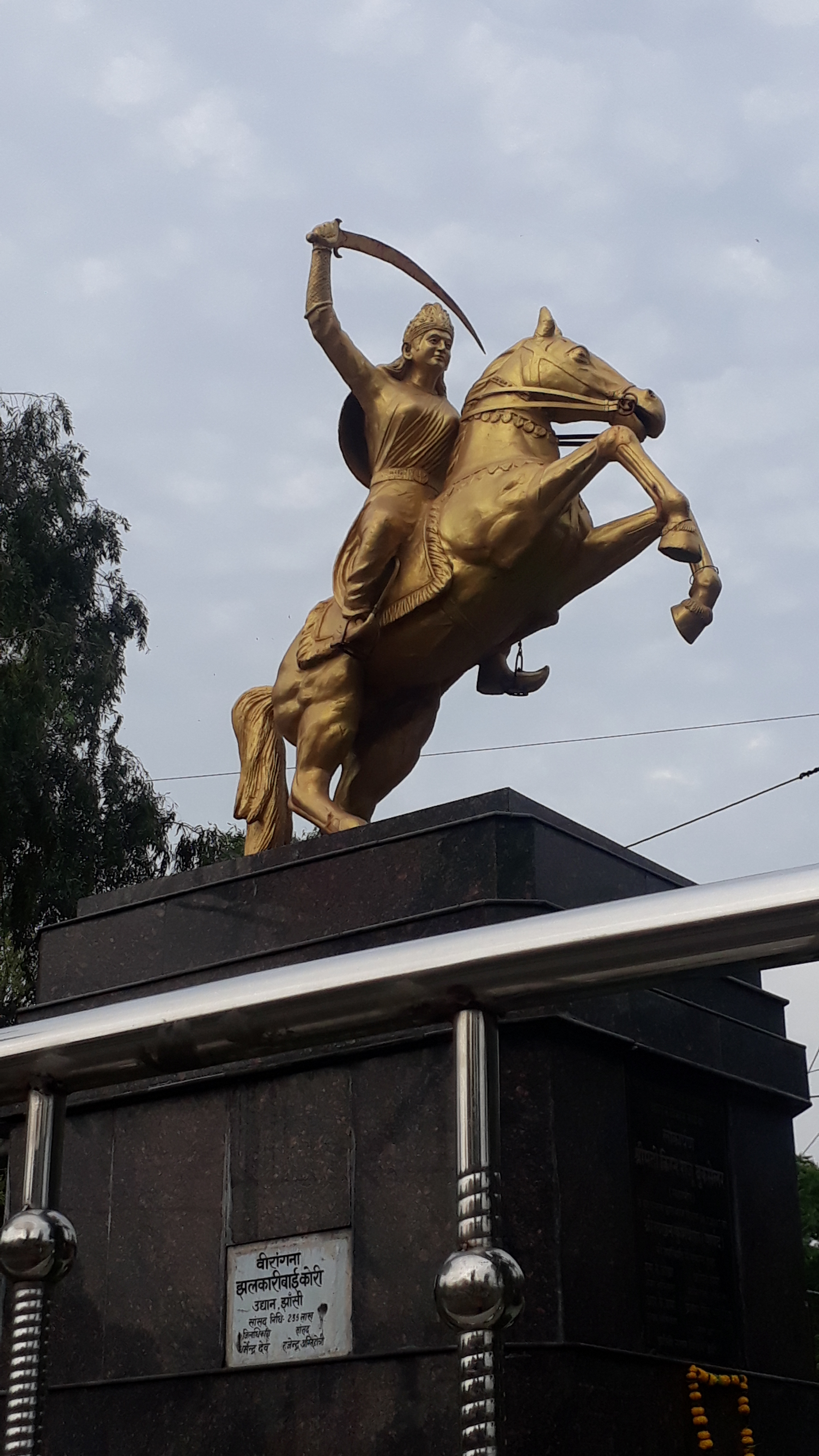
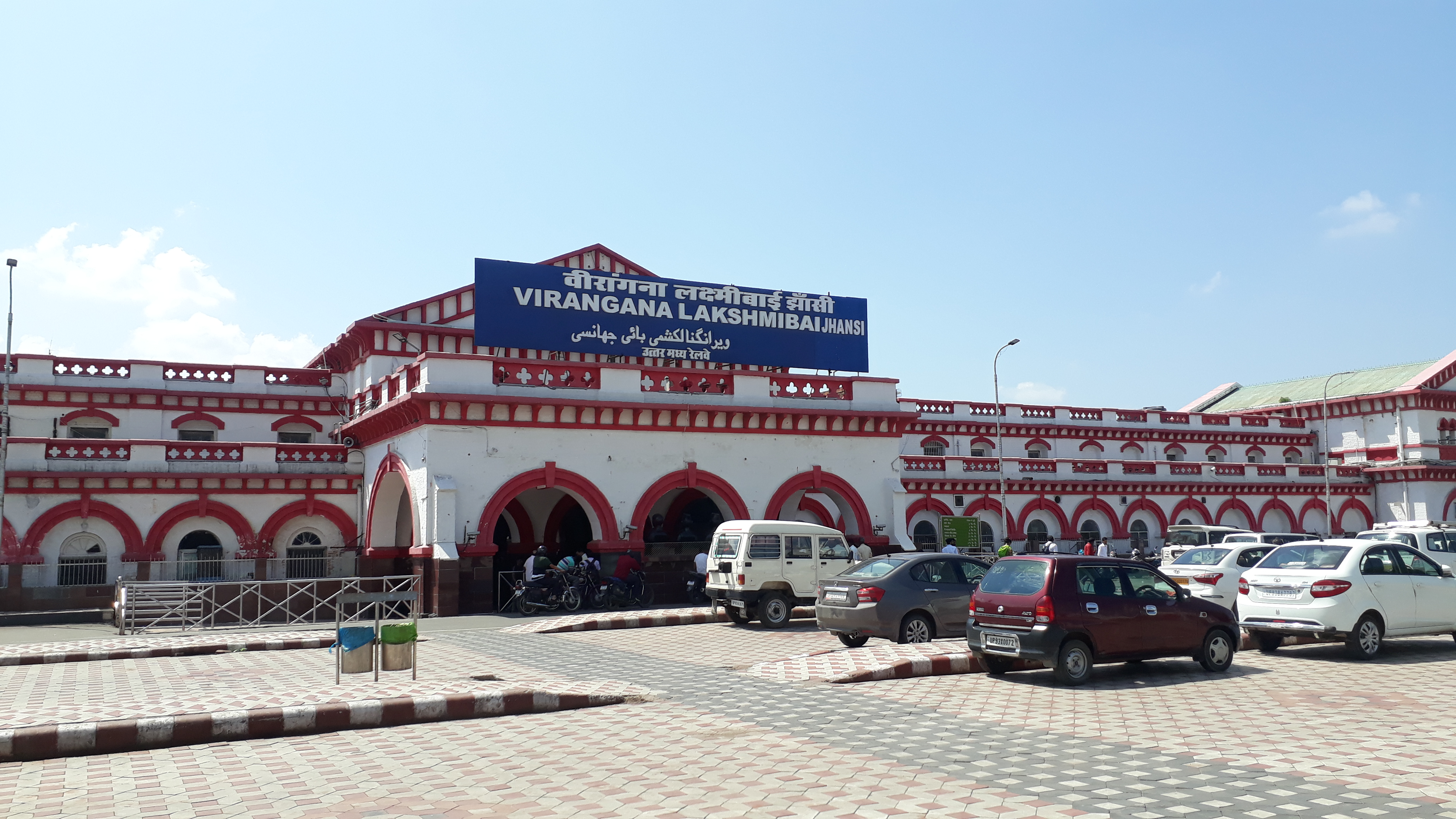
- Night view of Jhansi, Jhansi fort, Virangana Lakshmibai Railway Station, Statue of Jhalkaribai
- Nicknames: City of Rani Lakshmibai; Gateway of Bundelkhand; Crossroads of India (The Square of India): North-south corridor and East-west corridor
- Location within Uttar Pradesh Location within India
- Coordinates: 25°26′55″N 78°34′11″E
- Country: India
- State: Uttar Pradesh
- Region: Bundelkhand
- District: Jhansi
- Established: 1613
- Founder: Raja of Orchha

Government
  - Mayor: Bihari Lal Arya, (BJP)
  - District Magistrate: Avinash Kumar, IAS
  - SSP: Rajesh S, IPS

Area
  - Metropolis: 160 km^{2} (62 sq mi)
- Elevation: 285 m (935 ft)

Population (2011 census)
  - Metropolis: 505,693
  - Rank: 57
  - Density: 3,200/km^{2} (8,200/sq mi)
  - Metro: 547,638

Language
  - Official: Hindi
  - Additional official: Urdu
- Time zone: UTC+5:30 (IST)
- PIN: 284001-2-3-4
- Telephone code: 0510
- Vehicle registration: UP-93
- Sex ratio: ♂ 0.905 : ♀ 1.000
- Crude literacy: 73.90%
- Effective literacy: 83.0%
- Avg. summer temperature: 42.4 °C (108.3 °F)
- Avg. winter temperature: 4.0 °C (39.2 °F)
- Website: www.jhansi.nic.in

Jhansi (pronounced [d͡ʑʱãː.siː]) is a historic city in the Indian state of Uttar Pradesh. (Toshan) Balwant Nagar was the old name of Jhansi. It lies in the region of Bundelkhand, on the banks of the Pahuj River, in the extreme south of Uttar Pradesh. Jhansi is the administrative headquarters of Jhansi district and Jhansi division. Also called the Gateway to Bundelkhand, Jhansi is situated near and around the rivers Pahuj and Betwa at an average elevation of 285 m (935 ft). It is about 471 kilometres (293 mi) from national capital New Delhi, 109 kilometres (67.7 mi) from Gwalior, 240 kilometres (150 mi) from Kanpur and 320 kilometres (200 mi) from state capital Lucknow.

Jhansi is well connected to all other major towns in Uttar Pradesh by road and railway networks. The National Highways Development Project has supported development of the city. Jhansi is also being developed as the defence corridor by the NDA government which will boost the economy of the city and the region at the same time. The Srinagar to Kanyakumari north–south corridor passes closely to Jhansi, as does the east–west corridor; consequently there has been a sudden rush of infrastructure and real estate development in the city. Jhansi was adjudged the third cleanest city of Uttar Pradesh and the fastest moving city in the North Zone in Swachh Survekshan 2018 rankings. The development of a greenfield airport has been planned in the city. On 28 August 2011, Jhansi was selected among 98 cities for smart city initiative by the Government of India.

== Name ==
According to Paul Whalley, the name Jhānsī means "covered in bushes or undergrowth", from a variant of standard Hindi jhāṛ ("bushes, undergrowth"; ultimately from Sanskrit jhāṭa). The ending -sī represents a reduced form of the Sanskrit genitive suffix -sya.

A fanciful old folk etymology for the name Jhānsī derives the name from Hindi jhāīṁ sī, meaning "like a shadow" (or, in context, "rather indistinct"). This was supposedly said by the raja of Jaitpur, when asked by his host Bir Singh Deo if he could see the fort at Jhansi from the rooftop of his palace in Orchha. (The Jaitpur raj was only founded well after Bir Singh's death, and the entire story is probably entirely spurious.)

== History ==
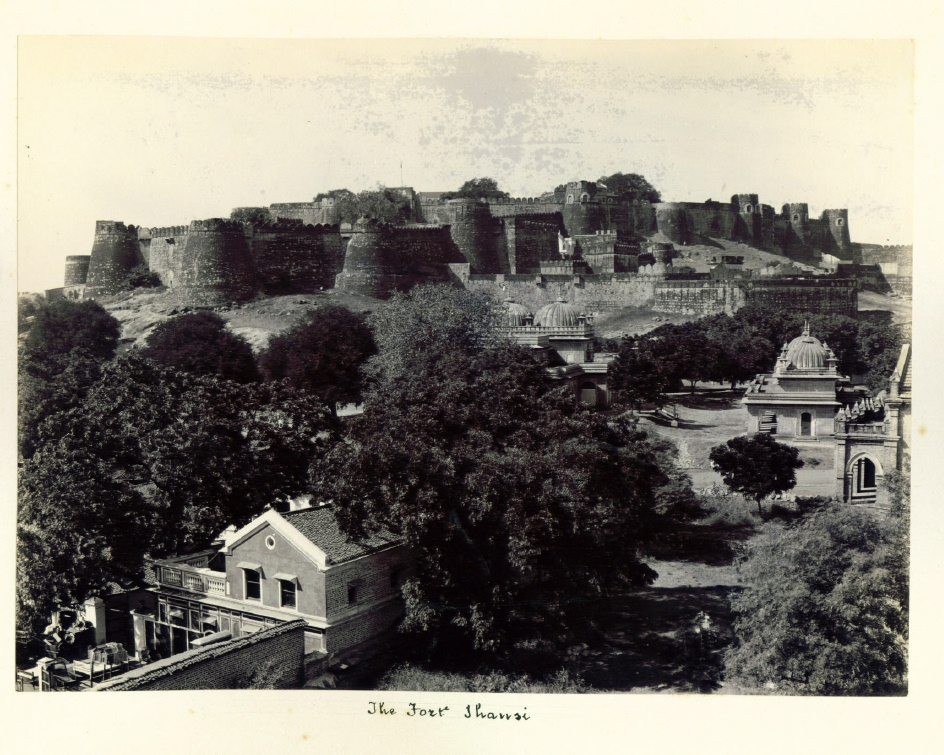
Jhansi Fort, 1900

=== Early history: Orchha and Mughal rule ===
Before the construction of Jhansi Fort on the Bangra hill in 1613, the site is said to have been covered by forest. The land then belonged to the nearby village of Lahargird, which itself belonged to the raja of Orchha's territory. Two Ahir pastoralists supposedly set up some huts at the foot of the hill to watch over their herds around 1553. The Orchha raja Bir Singh Deo later had the fort built in 1613, and a village grew up around it. The village was apparently called Balwantnagar at first; when Jhansi became the name is unknown.

After the death of Jhujhar Singh, Bir Singh's son and successor in Orchha, Jhansi came under Mughal control. Mughal troops and governors appear to have been posted here uninterrupted until the early 1700s.

=== Maratha rule ===
In 1722, Chhatrasal overran the Jhansi region as part of his new kingdom of Bundelkhand. However, in 1728, Muhammad Khan Bangash, the Nawab of Farrukhabad, drove him out and the area came back under Mughal control. Chhatrasal appealed for help to Baji Rao I, the Peshwa of the Maratha Empire, and their combined forces drove out the Mughal army. In return, Chhatrasal granted Jhansi (among other places) to Baji Rao in his will when he died in 1731. In 1735, Raja Indargir Gosain, Maratha governor of Jhansi fort, rebelled and ultimately established a small principality based at Moth to the northeast. In 1742, the Peshwa put Naru Shankar in charge of Jhansi along with miscellaneous other places.

Naru Shankar's tenure as governor was pivotal in Jhansi's history. Up until now, Jhansi had been a fairly small village below the fort, but during this period it grew to become a large town. Naru Shankar undertook construction projects in the town, including a major expansion of the fort. He also populated Jhansi with deportees from other towns, primarily Orchha. (The rajas of Orchha moved their capital to Tikamgarh around this time, and the town of Orchha itself rapidly declined.)

Naru Shankar was replaced as governor by Madho (or Madhaji) Gobind Antia in 1757. Antia constructed a reservoir known as the Antia Tal outside the city walls, on the Gwalior road. Another governor, Babu Rao Kanahi, served after Antia but before 1761, when Ganesh Shambhaji is described as "the Maratha officer in charge of Jhansi". In November 1761, Shuja-ud-Daula, the Nawab of Awadh, had begun a military campaign in Bundelkhand, and Ganesh Shambhaji decided to switch sides and join him. After what Ashirbadi Lal Srivastava describes as an "indiscriminate plunder of Jhansi" (he doesn't specify what this means), Ganesh Shambhaji jailed 52 of his Maratha colleagues and agreed to surrender Jhansi to Shuja-ud-Daula in return for a position in the Mughal service. After a detachment of Shuja-ud-Daula's captured the fortress of Moth, the Maratha governor of Jhansi (who Srivastava doesn't name) fearfully offered to submit and pay a 300,000-rupee tribute in return for being allowed to keep possession of the fort. Shuja-ud-Daula declined the offer and besieged the city. Its defenders surrendered on 1 February 1762. Shuja-ud-Daula appointed Muhammad Bashir as faujdar of the fort, and gave Ganesh Shambhaji the tax farm revenue for the district.

The Mughal rule of Jhansi only lasted for four years before Malhar Rao Holkar recaptured it for the Marathas. Naru Shankar was apparently re-appointed governor; after his death, he was succeeded by Vishwas Rao Lachman for five years.

=== Newalkar dynasty ===
The next governor was Raghunath Rao Newalkar. In late 1773, Shuja-ud-Daula sent another force south of the Yamuna, this time led by one Mir Naim, but they were defeated in a battle at Jhansi. Another Mughal-aligned force, led by Mirashgir, came to besiege Jhansi in late 1774, but the death of Shuja-ud-Daula in January 1775 resulted in the siege being abandoned. Raghunath Rao remained governor until his death in 1794; he had become practically independent by his death. He was succeeded by his brother Sheo Rao Hari, also called Sheo Rao Bhao. Sheo Rao was responsible for the construction of the city walls, which took place between 1796 and 1814. The Lachhmi Talao reservoir on the east side of town is sometimes attributed to Sheo Rao as well, although it has also been attributed to Anupgir Gosain of Moth instead.

Sheo Rao's descendants continued to rule what became known as Jhansi State until 1853. Sheo Rao himself signed the first treaty with the British in 1804, which established a military alliance between the two but still recognised Jhansi as a Maratha vassal. As part of the Treaty of Pune in 1817, overlordship was transferred from the Marathas to the British themselves.

The final ruler of Jhansi State was Gangadhar Rao, who ruled from 1842 to 1853. Gangadhar Rao was a patron of the arts and a capable administrator. His only son died in infancy, so before he died, he and his wife Lakshmi Bai adopted a five-year-old boy named Damodar Rao to serve as his successor. Although this was accepted practice in Hindu law, the British did not recognise Damodar Rao as a valid heir and, invoking the Doctrine of Lapse, declared that Jhansi State had escheated to the British government. Lakshmi Bai appealed to the British court of directors, but to no avail, and in March 1854 the British took control of Jhansi.

The newly-appointed British superintendent of Jhansi, Francis Gordon, wrote a report in 1854 documenting the state of the town at that time. He estimated that it had a population of 40,000 people. It was not an industrial centre of any kind, but he wrote that its commercial traffic was "enormous"; he estimated that 3 million rupees' worth of goods passed through Jhansi per year. Large amounts of grain, coming from farmland to the south and southwest, passed through Jhansi on its way north. Cotton was brought from the west and then transported north to Kalpi. Salt also came from the west. In exchange, the merchants from the south and west bought sugar and various kirana goods to sell back home. From 1853 to 1861, a cantonment was built on the southeast side of town.

=== Battle for independence 1857 ===
Several factors had contributed to tensions in Jhansi before the battle broke out. Besides the British annexation of Jhansi State, various other members of the landed aristocracy were upset by the British encroaching on their traditional authority. Local residents were also upset by the fact that the British had permitted cow slaughter after they took over Jhansi (it had previously been banned). Another grievance was that the British had suspended endowments to the temple of Mahalakshmi (the patron goddess of the Newalkar dynasty) which had previously come from revenue collected from certain villages.

At this point the garrison was composed entirely of Indian troops, and it consisted of five infantry companies, a cavalry force, and an artillery detachment, all commanded by British officers.

Tensions boiled over on 5 June. That afternoon, one company of the Jhansi infantry along with the artillery detachment surrounded and entered the star fort and magazine, under the pretext of an attack by dacoits. They announced their intention to garrison the star fort themselves. Most of the British civilians took shelter in the regular fort. The remaining four infantry companies along with the cavalry had not joined in at this point, and that they night slept in the barracks without incident. The next day, however, most of them rose up and attacked and killed the British officers on site. They made their way to the main fort, which the rebels encircled and besieged. This was short-lived and on the 7th the British surrendered. They were marched south to the Jokhan Bagh, just outside the city walls, and executed.

==== Lakshmi Bai's reign ====
On the 9th, there was a dispute between Lakshmi Bai and Sada Sheo Rao, a relative of her late husband, over who would rule in Jhansi, with both of them "bidding against each other" to win the support of the rebels. Lakshmi Bai offered much more and the rebels handed control of Jhansi to her. A proclamation was made saying "The people are God's, the country is the Padishah's, and the raj is Rani Lakshmi Bai's". Sada Sheo Rao assembled a force of 300 supporters, seized the fort of Karahra on 13 June, and attempted to proclaim himself ruler of Jhansi, but Lakshmi Bai sent troops after him and ultimately had him imprisoned and detained.

Her position now secure, Lakshmi Bai set up an administration in Jhansi. She set up a mint, raised an army, and strengthened the forts at Jhansi and Karahra. Attempting to stay on good terms with the British, she sent a letter to a British agent named Major Erskine saying that she had only aided the rebels under duress, disavowing the massacre of British prisoners, and presenting herself as just a caretaker until the British could reoccupy the area. Erskine responded by giving her full authorisation to rule on behalf of the British until their troops arrived and sent a proclamation that all were to obey her; he assured her that she would be treated well.

The main members of Lakshmi Bai's administration were her father, Moropant Tambe; Lalu, the paymaster; Lachman Rao, the diwan; and Kashi Nath, the tahsildar.

Meanwhile, the raja of Orchha, hoping to recover ancestral territories that had been conquered by the Marathas in the 1700s, invaded Jhansi. He presented himself to the British as a loyal ally of theirs fighting to suppress the rebellious rani of Jhansi. His troops looted the countryside and besieged Jhansi on 3 September. He lifted the siege on 22 October as reinforcements under the raja of Banpur came to assist the defenders. In early 1858, Lakshmi Bai finally drove the Orchha troops out of her territory, and had consolidated her control over all the territory that had belonged to Jhansi State before the British annexation.

As late as February 1858, Lakshmi Bai pledged loyalty to the British and sent them multiple letters promising to hand over Jhansi without a fight if they treated her honourably. However, governor-general Charles Canning had never wanted to follow through with Erskine's earlier proposition, and he considered the rani a rebel against British authority. On 11 February, Canning sent a letter to the British agent at Indore with instructions to try Lakshmi Bai before a special commission if captured. Lakhsmi Bai decided that she couldn't trust the British and her only option was to fight them. On 14 February, she issued a proclamation urging both Hindus and Muslims to take up arms against the British because "they would surely destroy the people's religion". At her disposal were 12,000 troops, including 400 cavalry and about 40 artillery pieces. She also made negotiations with rebel leaders including Tantya Tope.

==== Siege and capture by the British ====
Commanders under Lakshmi Bai had all the vegetation outside the fort burned so that advancing British troops could forage absolutely nothing for supplies. However, the rajas of Orchha and Gwalior provided plenty of supplies for the British and their horses, so it ended up being moot. British forces under Hugh Rose arrived at Jhansi on 21 March and began a siege the next day after some initial scouting. On the morning of 1 April, some 22,000 troops under Tantya Tope came to relieve the defenders of Jhansi. They engaged the British at Basoba, some ways away from Jhansi. Tantya Tope's forces successfully used a pincer formation to attack both flanks of British infantry, but a British cavalry counterattack used the same formation to envelop them, and Tantya's forces were routed.

On the morning of 3 April, the British stormed the city through a breach in the city wall. For the next two days, brutal hand-to-hand fighting took place in the streets as the British tried to advance toward the fort. During the night of 4–5 April, Lakshmi Bai escaped along with her bodyguards and followers and headed toward Kalpi. The British occupied the fort the following day. Rose's troops looted Jhansi, grabbing jewellery and other valuables and tearing down many of the houses and temples. The Sanskrit manuscript collection belonging to the royal family of Jhansi was destroyed. Rose, however, wrote to the governor-general that his troops had occupied the city peacefully and "behaved in an exemplary manner".

=== British Raj ===
After the rebellion was suppressed, the British rebuilt the cantonment of Jhansi south of the city walls. At first it was centrally located in the new district, but it went through repeated territorial flip-flopping which left the town at the extreme west of the district, effectively cut off from most of its associated territory. A treaty in 1861 transferred the town and fort of Jhansi, the parganas of Pachor and Karahra, and parts of parganas Jhansi and Bhander to Gwalior State. Jhansi was re-transferred to British rule in 1885 in exchange for the return of Gwalior, which the British had occupied after the uprising, as well as a payment of 15 lakh rupees. 58 villages were also transferred with Jhansi at the same time, making up the bulk of the Jhansi tehsil.

The railway came to Jhansi in 1889, when construction of the Indian Midland Railway was completed. Jhansi was both the headquarters of this railway as well as an important junction with lines heading to Kanpur and Agra. The railway quickly drew the bulk of the commercial traffic passing through the region, and Jhansi "sprang into sudden importance" as a commercial centre, surpassing Mau-Ranipur as the district's main trade centre.

In 1899, the Hardiganj market was opened on the site of a former royal garden. It grew to become the largest market in both the city and the district, supplying all the other markets with their own goods.

In 1886, the Indian National Congress came to Jhansi, and in 1888 Sripavati Ghosh was elected to serve as Jhansi's delegate in the Congress at Allahabad. The Congress's provincial conference was held in Jhansi in 1916, on the fort grounds and chaired by C. Y. Chintamani.

From 1926, the revolutionary Chandra Shekhar Azad was based in Jhansi, variously posing as a chauffeur and a mechanic.

=== Independent India ===
After the independence of India, Jhansi was included in the state of Uttar Pradesh.

== Geography and climate ==
Jhansi is located at 25.4333 N 78.5833 E. It has an average elevation of 284 metres (935 feet). Jhansi lies on the plateau of central India, an area dominated by rocky relief and minerals underneath the soil. The city has a natural slope in the north as it is on the south western border of the vast Tarai plains of Uttar Pradesh and the elevation rises on the south. The land is suitable for species of citrus fruit and crops include wheat, pulses, peas, and oilseeds. The region relies heavily on monsoon the rains for irrigation purposes. Under an ambitious canal project (the Rajghat canal), the government is constructing a network of canals for irrigation in Jhansi and Lalitpur and some part of Madhya Pradesh. The trade in agricultural products (including grain and oilseeds) is of great economic importance. The city is also a centre of brassware manufacture.

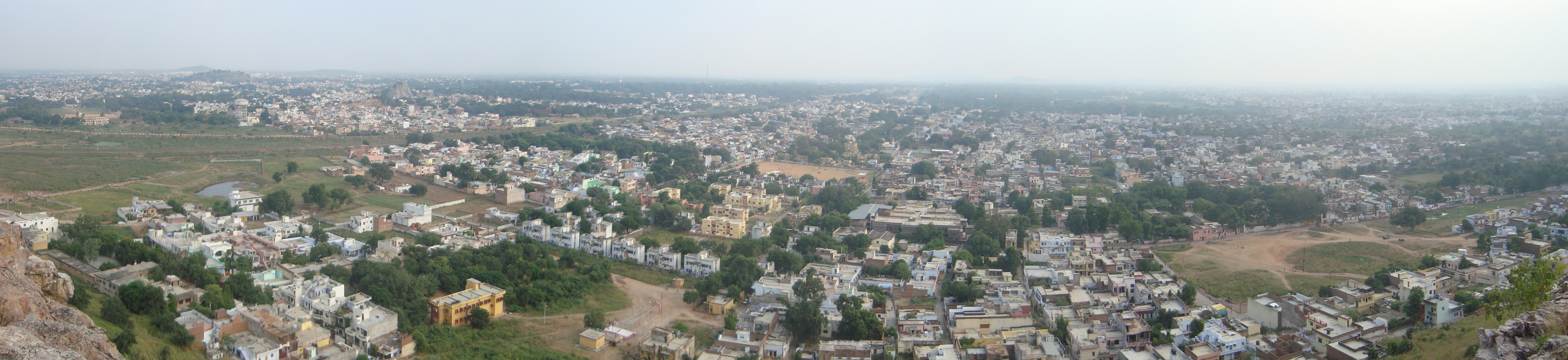
A view of Jhansi from the hill of Sipri)

=== Climate ===
Being on a rocky plateau, Jhansi experiences extreme temperatures. Winter begins in October with the retreat of the southwest monsoon (Jhansi does not experience any rainfall from the Northeast Monsoon) and peaks in mid-December. Temperatures are about 4 °C or 39.2 °F minimum and 21 °C or 69.8 °F maximum. Spring arrives by the end of February and is a short-lived phase of transition. Summer begins by April and summer temperatures can peak at 47 °C or 116.6 °F in May. The rainy season starts by the third week of June (although this is variable year to year), while the monsoon rains gradually weaken in September and end before the last week of September. In the rainy season, the average daily high temperature hovers around 36 °C or 96.8 °F with high humidity. The average rainfall for the city is about 1,150 millimetres or 45 inches per year, occurring almost entirely within the three-and-a-half months of the Southwest Monsoon. In summer Jhansi experiences temperatures as high as 45 to 49 °C (113.0 to 120.2 °F) degrees while in winter the temperatures can fall as low as 0 to 1 °C (32.0 to 33.8 °F) as recorded in winter 2011.

Climate data for Jhansi (1991–2020, extremes 1901–present)
Month	Jan	Feb	Mar	Apr	May	Jun	Jul	Aug	Sep	Oct	Nov	Dec	Year
Record high °C (°F)	33.8 (92.8)	39.4 (102.9)	43.3 (109.9)	46.2 (115.2)	49.3 (120.7)	48.1 (118.6)	45.6 (114.1)	42.2 (108.0)	40.6 (105.1)	40.6 (105.1)	38.1 (100.6)	35.5 (95.9)	49.3 (120.7)
Mean daily maximum °C (°F)	22.8 (73.0)	27.3 (81.1)	33.9 (93.0)	39.7 (103.5)	42.5 (108.5)	40.2 (104.4)	34.2 (93.6)	32.3 (90.1)	33.4 (92.1)	34.3 (93.7)	30.1 (86.2)	24.9 (76.8)	33.0 (91.4)
Mean daily minimum °C (°F)	8.6 (47.5)	11.9 (53.4)	17.3 (63.1)	23.2 (73.8)	27.4 (81.3)	27.9 (82.2)	25.6 (78.1)	24.6 (76.3)	23.9 (75.0)	20.3 (68.5)	14.8 (58.6)	10.2 (50.4)	19.7 (67.5)
Record low °C (°F)	0.5 (32.9)	0.6 (33.1)	5.3 (41.5)	10.1 (50.2)	15.1 (59.2)	18.5 (65.3)	20.3 (68.5)	18.3 (64.9)	16.7 (62.1)	6.3 (43.3)	1.1 (34.0)	0.3 (32.5)	0.3 (32.5)
Average rainfall mm (inches)	10.7 (0.42)	13.8 (0.54)	8.6 (0.34)	5.0 (0.20)	15.7 (0.62)	95.8 (3.77)	251.9 (9.92)	248.5 (9.78)	149.0 (5.87)	23.0 (0.91)	5.0 (0.20)	4.3 (0.17)	831.2 (32.72)
Average rainy days	1.0	1.1	0.8	0.6	1.6	5.7	11.9	12.4	7.1	1.3	0.4	0.4	44.3
Average relative humidity (%) (at 17:30 IST)	57	46	32	24	25	42	69	75	64	45	47	57	49
Source: India Meteorological Department

Jhansi has been ranked 3rd best “National Clean Air City” under (Category 2 3-10L Population cities) in India according to 'Swachh Vayu Survekshan 2024 Results' The city has shown a 19% improvement in air quality compared to the previous year.

== Demographics ==
Historical population
Year	Pop.	±%
1871	30,000	—
1881	33,000	+10.0%
1891	53,779	+63.0%
1901	55,724	+3.6%
1911	70,200	+26.0%
1921	66,400	−5.4%
1931	76,700	+15.5%
1941	103,300	+34.7%
1951	127,400	+23.3%
1961	140,200	+10.0%
1971	173,300	+23.6%
1981	231,300	+33.5%
1991	300,850	+30.1%
2001	426,198	+41.7%
2011	505,693	+18.7%
Source: 1871-1891 - The Imperial Gazetteer of India; 1901-1981 - Populstat.info; 1991-2011 - Citypopulation.de

Religions in Jhansi city (2011)
Religion	Percent
Hinduism	81.10%
Islam	16.51%
Christianity	0.94%
Sikhism	0.52%
Jainism	0.46%
Other or not stated	0.47%
Distribution of religions

As of 2011 Indian Census, Jhansi city had a total population of 505,693, of which 265,449 were males and 240,244 were females. Population within the age group of 0 to 6 years was 55,824. The total number of literates in Jhansi city was 373,500, which constituted 73.9% of the population with male literacy of 78.9% and female literacy of 68.3%. The effective literacy rate of 7+ population of Jhansi city was 83.0%, of which male literacy rate was 88.9% and female literacy rate was 76.6%. The Scheduled Castes and Scheduled Tribes population was 110,318 and 1,681 respectively. Jhansi city had 91,150 households in 2011.

Languages in Jhansi (2011)
1. Hindi (97.1%)
2. Urdu (1.57%)
3. Others (1.29%)

Hindi was the predominant language in the city, while Urdu was spoken by a minority.

The Jhansi urban agglomeration had a population of 547,638 which also included Jhansi Cantonment and Jhansi Railway Settlement.

=== Jhansi Cantonment ===
Jhansi Cantonment had a total population of 28,343 in 2011, of which 17,023 were males and 11,320 were females. Population within the age group of 0 to 6 years was 3,404. The total number of literates in Jhansi Cantonment was 23,354, which constituted 82.4% of the population. The effective literacy rate of 7+ population of Jhansi Cantonment was 93.6%. The Scheduled Castes and Scheduled Tribes population was 4,735 and 28 respectively. It had 30,460 households in 2011.

=== Jhansi Railway Settlement ===
Jhansi Railway Settlement had a total population of 13,602 as of 2011, of which 7,226 were males and 6,376 were females. Population within the age group of 0 to 6 years was 1,168. The total number of literates in Jhansi Railway Settlement was 10,754, which constituted 79.1%. The effective literacy rate of 7+ population of Jhansi Railway Settlement was 86.5%, of which male literacy rate was 92.1% and female literacy rate was 80.2%. The Scheduled Castes and Scheduled Tribes population was 3,373 and 38 respectively. It had 30460 households in 2011.

== Songs and Poems ==
A number of patriotic songs have been written about the Rani. The most famous composition about Rani Lakshmi Bai is the Hindi poem Jhansi ki Rani written by Subhadra Kumari Chauhan. An emotionally charged description of the life of Rani Lakshmibai, it is often taught in schools in India. A popular stanza from it reads:

बुंदेले हरबोलों के मुँह हमने सुनी कहानी थी, खूब लड़ी मर्दानी वह तो झाँसी वाली रानी थी।।

Translation: "From the bards of Bundela we have heard this story / She fought valiantly like a warrior woman, she was the queen of Jhansi."

For Marathi people there is an equally well-known ballad about the brave queen penned at the spot near Gwalior where she died in battle, by B. R. Tambe, who was a poet laureate of Maharashtra and of her clan. A couple of stanzas run like this:

रे हिंदबांधवा, थांब या स्थळीं अश्रु दोन ढाळीं /

ती पराक्रमाची ज्योत मावळे इथे झाशिवाली / ... / घोड्यावर खंद्या स्वार, हातात नंगि तर्वार / खणखणा करित ती वार / गोर्‍यांची कोंडी फोडित पाडित वीर इथे आली /

मर्दानी झाशीवाली!

Translation: "You, denizen of this land, pause here and shed a tear or two / For this is where the flame of the valorous lady of Jhansi was extinguished / … / Astride a stalwart stallion / With a naked sword in hand / She burst open the British siege / And came to rest here, the brave lady of Jhansi!"

== Education ==
=== Higher education ===
- Bundelkhand University
- Rani Lakshmi Bai Central Agricultural University

==== Medical and technical colleges ====
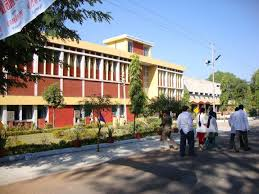
MLB Medical College

In October 2009, the Union health ministry gave approvals for setting up an institute equivalent to AIIMS, the first in Bundelkhand region and developing central agriculture university.

- Bundelkhand Institute of Engineering & Technology
- Government Polytechnic Jhansi
- Maharani Laxmi Bai Medical College, established 1968

=== Schools ===
- Christ the King College, Jhansi
- Army Public School, Jhansi

== Economy ==
Jhansi has a mixed economy, Jhansi's economy is based on agriculture, industry, mining and tourism.

- Agriculture:

A significant portion of the economy is tied to agriculture, with the district relying on monsoon rains for irrigation. primarily driven by agriculture, with crops like wheat, pulses, and oilseeds being major sources of income. The Rajghat canal project aims to improve irrigation and boost agricultural production.

- Industry:

Established industries, including BHEL Jhansi, cement factories, and a thermal power plant, play a crucial role in the district's economy. Some valuable industrial units are located in Jhansi.

- Parichha Thermal Power Station
- Electric Loco Shed, Jhansi
- BHEL Jhansi
- Diamond Cement Jhansi

In 2023, the Uttar Pradesh government announced plans to develop Jhansi as part of the Bundelkhand Industrial Development Authority. This initiative aims to create a new industrial township, potentially boosting the region's economic growth and employment opportunities.

== Municipal finance ==
According to financial data published on the CityFinance Portal of the Ministry of Housing and Urban Affairs, the Jhansi Municipal Corporation reported total revenue receipts of ₹179 crore (US$21 million) and total expenditure of ₹202 crore (US$24 million) in 2022–23. Tax revenue accounted for about 13.4% of the total revenue, while the corporation received ₹143 crore in grants during the financial year.

== Transport ==
The city is connected to other parts of India by railways and major highways.

=== Railways ===
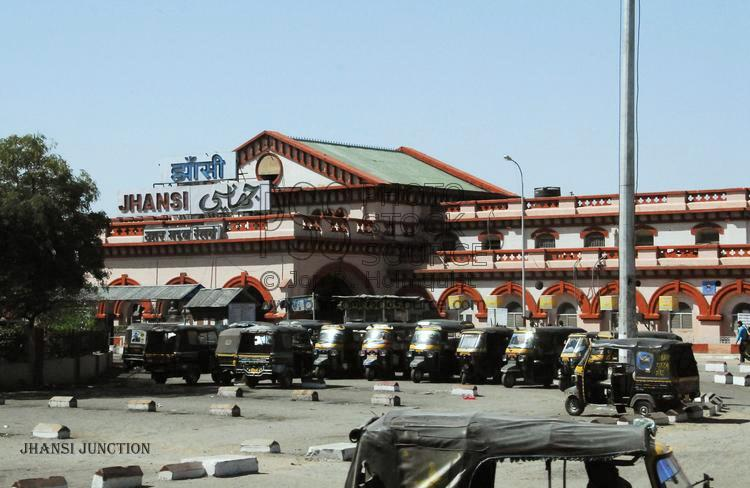
Jhansi Junction

Jhansi has its own division in the North Central Railway zone of Indian Railways. It lies on the main Delhi-Chennai and Delhi-Mumbai lines. The station code is VGLJ. Trains for every part of the country are available 24*7, The first ever Shatabdi Express commenced its journey from New Delhi to Jhansi Jn. Each and every train stops at Jhansi Jn.

=== Road transport ===
Jhansi is located at the junction of these National Highways: National Highway 27 (India) from Gujarat to Assam; National Highway 75 (India) from Gwalior to Rewa via Chhatarpur; National Highway 44 (India) from Jammu to Kanyakumari; and National Highway 39 (India). Thus, Jhansi commands a strategic position in the roadways network as highways in five different directions diverge from it.

The towns and major cities connected to it are Datia, Gwalior, Lalitpur, Agra, New Delhi, Bhopal, Prayagraj, Kanpur, Lucknow, Babina, Orchha, Banda, Shivpuri, Chhatarpur, Unnao Balaji, and Sagar.

=== Air transport ===
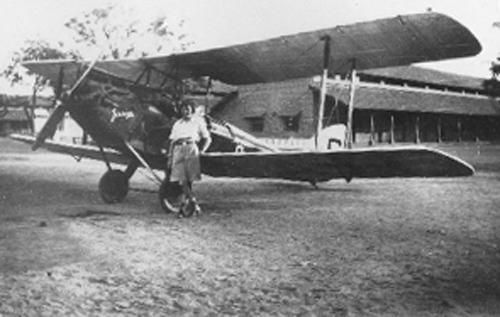
Amy Johnson at Jhansi in 1932

Jhansi Airstrip is a military aviation base built in the British era used by the Indian army and political visitors. Though there are provisions for private aircraft to land, there are no civil aviation operations. There had been a demand to make it operational for commercial purposes in the 1990s and again in the 2000s. The Uttar Pradesh government announced the construction of an all-new civil aviation base to support tourism in Bundelkhand in April 2011. As of 2020, the Kanpur Airport, located 238 km (148 mi) away, is the nearest major airport to Jhansi within the state, though Gwalior Airport in the neighbouring state of Madhya Pradesh is the nearest airport being located 116 km (72 mi) from Jhansi which has direct flights to Delhi, Mumbai, Bangalore and Hyderabad.

== Armed forces ==
The Jhansi Cantonment was the site of the accommodation for British civil and military personnel in the period of British rule in India. Jhansi district is the headquarters of the 31st Indian Armoured Division, stationed at Jhansi-Babina. There has been a joint exercise from 1 to 30 March 2012 with the Singaporean Army at Jhansi witnessed by the President of India, Pratibha Patil.

== Media ==
Amar Ujala, Dainik Jagran, Patrika, and Dainik Bhaskar are some of the newspapers with online news services.

=== Newspapers ===
Many national and local newspapers are published in Jhansi in Hindi, Urdu and English:

Newspaper	Language
Amar Ujala	Hindi
Dainik Jagran	Hindi
Dainik Royal Mail	Hindi
Dainik Vishwa Pariwar	Hindi
Patrika	Hindi
Swadesh	Hindi
Dainik Uddhog Hakikat	Hindi

=== Radio ===
Jhansi has five radio stations: Radio Mirchi 98.3 FM, 92.7 BIG FM, 103.0 AIR FM and 91.1 Red FM and 93.5 FM.

== Sport ==
Sports stadiums in Jhansi are Dhyanchand Stadium, Railway Stadium, and LVM Sports Place. Dhyanchand Stadium is the best place in Jhansi to learn sports skills. Many Sports played in Dhyanchand Stadium like Hockey, cricket, football, chess and many more.

== Notable people ==
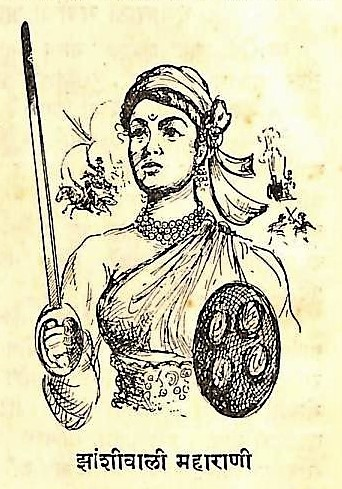
Rani Lakshmi Bai

- Pradeep Jain Aditya, is an Indian politician from Indian National Congress (INC)
- Ramesh Chandra Agarwal, media proprietor and founder-chairman of the Dainik Bhaskar group of newspapers
- Edward Angelo (born 1870), Australian politician
- Alexander Archdale, English actor in theatre and film
- Chandra Shekhar Azad, Indian freedom fighter
- Vinod Kumar Bansal, Bansal classes, Kota
- Michael Bates, English actor; Last of the Summer Wine and It Ain't Half Hot Mum
- Raja Bundela, Indian actor, producer, politician and civil activist
- Major Dhyan Chand, (Padma Bhushan), former Indian Army officer and Indian field hockey player
- Raghunath Vinayak Dhulekar MCA & Member of Parliament 1952, MLC & Speaker Vidhan Parishad 1958, notable pleader, Social leader
- Maithili Sharan Gupt, Rashtrakavi (National Poet), Member of Parliament (1952-1964), Padma Bhushan (1954) and pioneer of hindi poetry
- Hesketh Hesketh-Prichard, explorer, adventurer, big-game hunter and marksman who improved to sniping practice in the British Army in the First World War
- Indeevar, Hindi films lyricist
- Piyush Jha, film director and screenwriter and novelist of Indian origin
- Jhalkaribai, freedom fighter and advisor to Rani Lakshmi Bai
- Rani of Jhansi, queen of Jhansi (1853–58), consort of Maharaja Gangadhar Rao Newalkar of Jhansi
- Abdul Karim, an Indian attendant of Queen Victoria who served her during the final 15 years of her reign, gaining her maternal affection over that time.
- Subodh Khandekar, Olympian hockey player
- B. B. Lal, former Director General of the Archaeological Survey of India (ASI), known for his contribution on Indus Valley Civilization, Mahabharat and Ramayana sites.
- Pankaj Mishra, Indian essayist and novelist
- Joy Mukherjee, Indian actor and director
- Ram Mukherjee, Indian director
- Sashadhar Mukherjee, producer of Hindi films
- Subodh Mukherjee, director, producer, writer of Hindi cinema; hits include Paying Guest, Munimji, Love Marriage (parts were shot at Jhansi), and Junglee
- Randeep Rai, Indian television and film actor
- Gangadhar Rao, Raja of Jhansi State, 1838–53
- Raaj Shaandilyaa, Bollywood writer and director
- Anurag Sharma is a Bharatiya Janata Party politician and Member of Parliament in Lok Sabha from Jhansi-Lalitpur constituency of Uttar Pradesh
- Vishwanath Sharma, owner of Baidyanath Group, parliamentarian
- Amit Singhal, senior vice-president at Google
- Surendra Verma, Hindi author and playwright
- Vrindavan Lal Verma (9 January 1889 – 23 February 1969) was a Hindi novelist and playwright. He was honoured with Padma Bhushan for his literary works

== Jhansi in popular culture ==
=== Jhansi in literature ===
Two novels by John Masters are set in the fictional town of Bhowani. According to the author, writing in the glossary to the earlier novel, Nightrunners of Bengal, Bhowani is an "imaginary town. To get a geographical bearing on the story it should be imagined to be about where Jhansi really is - 25.27 N., 78.33 E." Nightrunners of Bengal is set during the Indian Rebellion of 1857 at "Bhowani" (the title alludes to the mysterious distribution of "chapatis" to village headmen which preceded the revolt). Bhowani Junction is set in 1946/47 the eve of independence. In each novel the main character is a British army officer named Colonel Rodney Savage, one of a succession of such men from the same family.

Christina Rossetti wrote a short poem about the fate of the Skene family at Jhansi during the Indian Mutiny. It is entitled "In the Round Tower at Jhansi - 8 June 1857". It was published in 1862 in the same volume as her more celebrated poem "Goblin Market". Some time afterward, Rossetti discovered that she had been misinformed about the husband and wife's suicide pact in the face of a murderous and implacable enemy ('The swarming howling wretches below' the tower walls) which is the poem's subject, but did not delete it from later editions. Jhansi is the centre of story in Vrindavan Lal Verma's Hindi novel 'Jhansi Ki Rani'. This novel tells the story of Jhansi ki Rani Lakshmibai, who fought bravely in 1858–59 to save Jhansi from the Britishers' attack.

== See also ==
- Barua Sagar
- List of educational institutions in Jhansi
- Matatila Dam
- Parichha
- Jhansi Ki Rani
- Jhansi Cantonment Cemetery
