= English society =

Group behaviour of the English people

English society comprises the group behaviour of the English people, and of collective social interactions, organisation and political attitudes in England. The social history of England evidences many social and societal changes over the history of England, from Anglo-Saxon England to the contemporary forces upon the Western world. These major social changes have occurred both internally and in its relationship with other nations. The themes of social history include demographic history, labour history and the working class, women's history, family, the history of education in England, rural and agricultural history, urban history and industrialisation.

== Prehistoric society ==
The distant past does not offer much information on the structures of society. However, major changes in human behaviour make it likely that society must have changed dramatically. In common with much of Europe, the switch from the hunter-gatherer lifestyle to farming around 4000 BC must have heralded an enormous shift in all aspects of human life. Nobody knows what changes may have occurred, and recent evidence of permanent buildings and habitation from 3,000 years ago means that these may still have been gradual shifts. One of the most obvious symbols of change in prehistoric society is Stonehenge. The building of such stone circles, burial mounds and monuments throughout the British Isles seems to have required a division of labour. Builders would have needed to dedicate themselves to the task of monument construction to acquire the necessary skills. Not having time to hunt and farm would make them rely on others to such an extent that specialised farmers would emerge who provided not only for themselves but also for the monument builders. There are many changes in culture seen in prehistoric and later times such as the Beaker people, the Celts, the Romans and the Anglo-Saxons.

== Romans ==
The Roman invasion of Britain in 54 BC probably did not alter society greatly at first, as it was simply a replacement of the ruling class, but numerous, at first minor, ideas would later gain footholds. Certainly, it would not have affected Ireland in the slightest. It is from the Romans, and particularly Tacitus, that we get the earliest detailed written records of Britain and its tribal society. We get fascinating glimpses of society in Britain before the Romans, although only briefly and disparagingly mentioned, particularly the importance of powerful women such as Cartimandua and Boudica. City dwelling was not new to pre-Roman Britain, but it was a lifestyle that the Romans preferred even though available to only a select few Romanised Britons. Romanisation was an important part of the Roman conquest strategy, and British rulers who willingly adopted Roman ways were rewarded as client kings; a good example of this is Togidubnus and his ultramodern Fishbourne Roman Palace. To subdue and control the country, the Romans built a major road network which not only was an important civil engineering project but formed the basis of the country's communication links. The Romans brought many other innovations and ideas such as writing and plumbing, but how many of these things were the preserve of the rich or were even lost and re-appropriated at a later date is uncertain.

== Early medieval society ==
The collapse of the Western Roman Empire in the 5th century is thought to have brought general strife and anarchy to society, but the actual events are not well understood. Archaeology certainly shows a reduction in the expensive goods found before, and the Roman cities began to be abandoned, but much of British society had never had such things. Certainly, numerous peoples took advantage of the absence of Roman power, but how they affected British society is far from clear. The hegemony of Roman rule gave way to a selection of splintered, often competing, societies, including later the heptarchy. Rather than think of themselves as a small part of a larger Roman empire, they reverted to smaller tribal allegiances.

The Anglo-Saxons' arrival is the most hotly disputed of events, and the extent to which they killed, displaced, or integrated with the existing society is still questioned. What is clear is that a separate Anglo-Saxon society, which would eventually become England with a more Germanic feel, was set up in the south east of the island. These new arrivals had not been conquered by the Romans, but their society was perhaps similar to that of Britain. The main difference was their pagan religion, which the surviving northern areas of non-Saxon rule sought to convert to Christianity. During the 7th century these northern areas, particularly Northumbria, became important sites of learning, with monasteries acting like early schools and intellectuals such as Bede being influential. In the 9th century Alfred the Great worked to promote a literate, educated people and did much to promote the English language, even writing books himself. Alfred and his successors unified and brought stability to most of the south of Britain that would eventually become England.

== Late medieval society ==
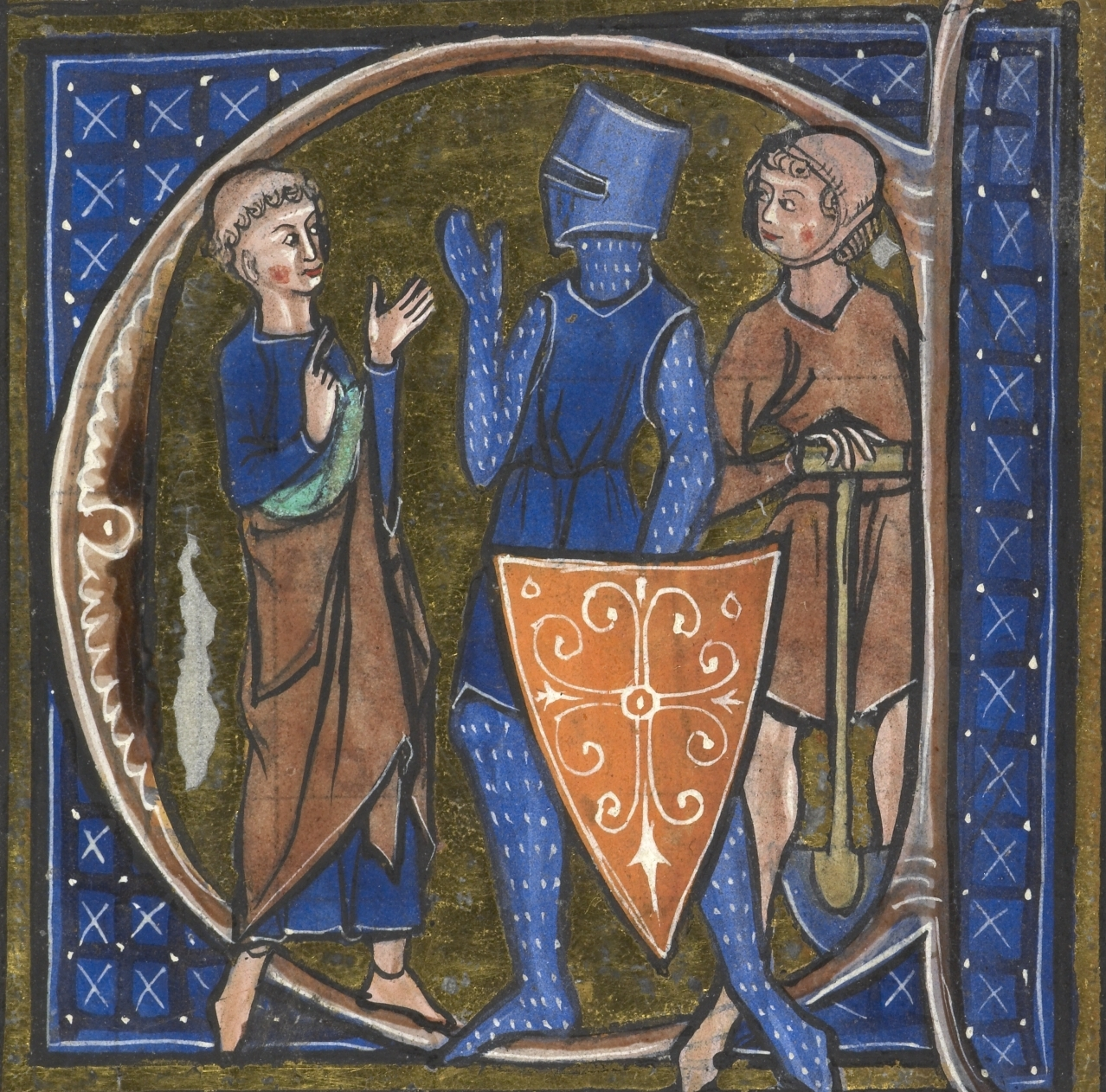
The medieval English saw their economy as comprising three groups – the clergy, who prayed; the knights, who fought; and the peasants, who worked the land. The monasteries and the nobility owned most of the land, but some rich peasants also owned land.

After the Norman Conquest of England in 1066, society seemed fixed and unchanging for several centuries, but gradual and significant changes were still taking place, the exact nature of which would not be appreciated until much later. The Norman lords spoke Norman French, and in order to work for them or gain advantage, the English had to use the Anglo-Norman language that developed in England. This became a necessary administrative and literary language (see Anglo-Norman literature), but despite this the English language was not supplanted, and after gaining much in grammar and vocabulary began in turn to replace the language of the rulers. At the same time the population of England more than doubled between Domesday and the end of the 13th century, and this growth was not checked by the almost continual foreign warfare, crusades and occasional civil anarchy.

Feudalism, although historians debate the term, is often used to describe medieval society. Basically stated, a lord owns land or a fief which he allows vassals to work in return for their military service. The vast majority of the people were peasants who would work on the vassal's fiefs. This or a similar system was the basis of later medieval society. It probably existed in some form in England before the Norman conquest, but the Normans did much to institute it, either replacing existing lords or by becoming 'overlords' above now-demoted lords. A wealth of information on these social structures can be drawn from the best early surveys of its type, the Domesday Book.

=== Church ===
The Crusades are one measure of the ever-increasing power of the church in medieval life, with some estimates suggesting that as many as 40,000 clergy were ordained during the 13th century. This is also shown by the spate of cathedral building, common throughout Europe, at the time. These great buildings would often take several generations to complete, spawning whole communities of artisans and craftsmen and offering them jobs for life. A quarter of the land was owned by the Church. Its monasteries owned large tracts of land farmed by peasants.

=== Prosperity and population growth ===
The two centuries from 1200 to 1400 (when the plague hit) were prosperous. The population grew rapidly, from about 2 million to about 5 million. England remained a mainly rural society, and many agricultural changes, such as crop rotation, kept the countryside profitable. Most people lived by farming, although there were wide variations in patterns of land ownership and the status of peasants. To meet the needs of the growing population more land had to be cultivated. Waste land was exploited and major incursions were made into forests, fen and marsh lands. "High farming" was increasingly practised, whereby the landowner took personal control of his land using hired hands rather than leasing it out. Treatises appeared on the best practices, but the growth of per-acre productivity was small. On good land one acre might produce 17 bushels of wheat (compared to 73 bushels an acre in the 1960s), or 26 of barley or 22 of oats.

After 1300 prosperity was more tenuous owing to a combination of over-population, land shortages and depleted soils. The loss of life in the Great Famine of 1315–1317 shook the English economy severely, and population growth ceased. The first outbreak of the Black Death in 1348 then killed around half the English population, but left plenty of land for the survivors. The agricultural sector shrank, with higher wages, lower prices and shrinking profits leading to the final demise of the old demesne system and the advent of the modern farming system of cash rents for lands. Wat Tyler's Peasants' Revolt of 1381 shook the older feudal order and limited the levels of royal taxation considerably for a century to come.

=== Towns ===
The increase in population led not only to denser rural areas but also to more and larger towns. Many new towns appeared but most were small. Major cities such as Lincoln, Norwich and Thetford had 4,000–5,000 population, while London grew from 10,000 to nearly 40,000 population and York approached 10,000.

The 13th century experienced a mini-industrial revolution, with the increased use of wind power and changes in the wool industry. Wool, always important to the British economy, was traditionally exported to be processed, but it was now frequently processed in England, creating a variety of extra jobs. The export of cloth continued to increase from the 14th century onwards, and after the closing of the port of Calais (which consumed much of the raw wool) by the Spanish in the late 16th century, cloth became the primary type of wool exported. Many people were finding different roles and responsibilities within English society too, with the growth of common law giving people greater access to the law and the "commons" starting to have a place in the Parliament during Edward I of England's time.

=== Black Death and population decline ===
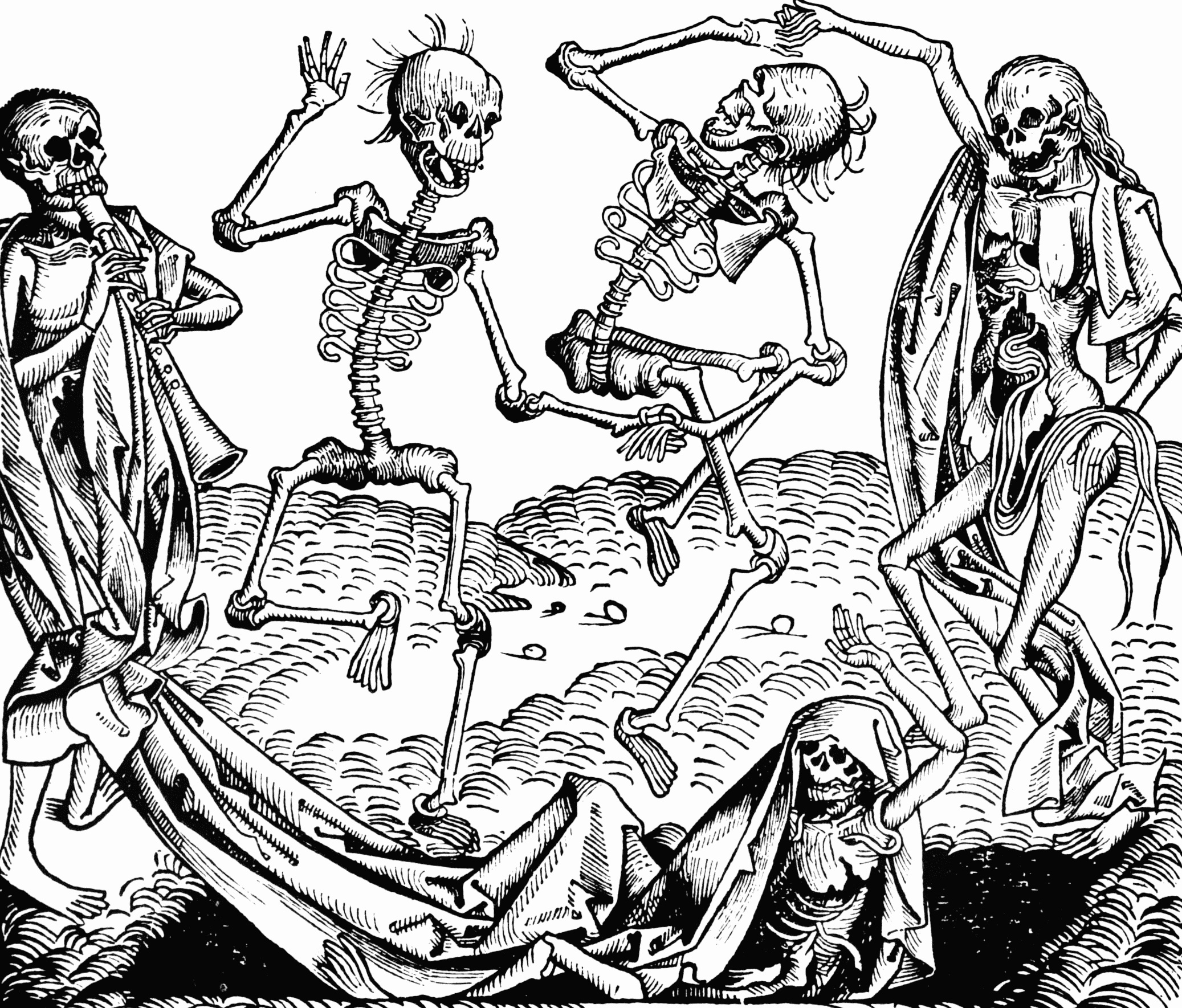
The Black Death re-shaped society; the "dance of death" was a favourite visual image; no one knew who would die and who would live.

After many years of growth and gradual change, there was one seismic event which changed British society dramatically. The Black Death in the middle of the 14th century almost halved the population. Whole villages were wiped out by the plague, but rather than destroying society it managed to reinvigorate it. Before the plague there was a large, probably excessive, workforce with not enough productive work available. Overpopulation meant that before the Black Death too many people were competing for scarce resources. Afterwards, the drop in population meant that labourers were in short supply and were paid better. Peasants who had once been confined to a landowner's estate now had an incentive to travel to areas without workers. This social mobility was combined with the fact that peasants could charge much more for their services, and this began a switch from indentured labourer to wage earner, which signalled the decline of the feudal system.

The peasants' new-found freedoms were very worrying to the authorities, who passed laws specifying the maximum that a peasant should be paid, but this had little effect on wages. The first of several sumptuary laws were also made, dictating exactly how people at every level of society should dress and what they could own, in an effort to enforce social distinctions. These new laws, plus a newly levied poll tax which had been calculated on pre-plague population figures, led directly to the Peasants' Revolt. Although quickly put down, the revolt was an early popular reform movement—a precursor to later, more successful uprisings.

=== Chaucer's vision ===
Geofrey Chaucer's Canterbury Tales give an illuminating picture of many of the different people who made up medieval society, although these portraits are limited mainly to the middle classes. The Wife of Bath is one particularly vibrant character within the Tales, and a few years later a real-world equivalent, Margery Kempe, showed in her autobiography that women had an important part in medieval society.

== Tudor society ==
In general terms, the Tudor dynasty period was seen as relatively stable compared to the previous years of almost constant warfare. However, the Reformation caused internal and external social conflict, with a considerable impact on social structure and personality.

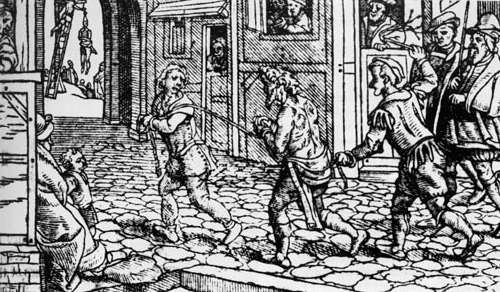
A woodcut from circa 1536 depicting a vagrant being punished in the streets in Tudor England.

Before they were broken up and sold by Henry VIII, monasteries had been one of the important parts of social welfare, giving alms and looking after the destitute, and their disappearance meant that the state would have to adopt this role, which culminated in the Poor Law of 1601. The monasteries were decrepit and no longer were the major educational or economic establishments in the country. After they had gone, many new grammar schools were founded and these, along with the earlier introduction of the printing press, helped to improve literacy.

=== Food and agriculture ===
The agricultural reforms which had begun in the 13th century accelerated in the 16th century, with enclosure altering the open-field system and denying many of the poor access to land. Large areas of land which had once been common, and whose usage had been shared between many people, were now being enclosed by the wealthy mainly for extremely profitable sheep farming.

England's food supply was plentiful throughout most of the era; there were no famines. Bad harvests caused distress, but they were usually localised. The most widespread came in 1555–57 and 1596–98. In the towns the price of staples was fixed by law; in hard times the size of the loaf of bread sold by the baker was smaller.

The poor consumed a diet largely of bread, cheese, milk, and beer, with small portions of meat, fish and vegetables, and occasionally some fruit. Potatoes were just arriving at the end of the period, and became increasingly important. The typical poor farmer sold his best products on the market, keeping the cheap food for the family. Stale bread could be used to make bread puddings, and bread crumbs served to thicken soups, stews, and sauces. At a somewhat higher social level, families ate an enormous variety of meats, especially beef, mutton, veal, lamb, and pork, as well as chickens and ducks. The holiday goose was a special treat. Many rural folk and some townspeople tended a small garden which produced vegetables such as asparagus, cucumbers, spinach, lettuce, beans, cabbage, carrots, leeks, and peas, as well as medicinal and flavoring herbs. Some raised their own apricots, grapes, berries, apples, pears, plums, currants, and cherries. Families without a garden could trade with their neighbours to obtain vegetables and fruits at low cost.

The people discovered new foods (such as the potato and tomato imported from the Americas), and developed new tastes during the era. The more prosperous enjoyed a wide variety of food and drink, including exotic new drinks such as coffee and chocolate. French and Italian chefs appeared in the country houses and palaces, bringing new standards of food preparation and taste. For example, the English developed a taste for acidic foods—such as oranges for the upper class—and started to use vinegar heavily. The gentry paid increasing attention to their gardens, with new fruits, vegetables and herbs; pasta, pastries, and dried mustard balls first appeared on the table. The apricot was a special treat at fancy banquets. Roast beef remained a staple for those who could afford it. The rest ate a great deal of bread and fish. Every class had a taste for beer and rum.

At the rich end of the scale the manor houses and palaces were awash with large, elaborately prepared meals, usually for many people and often accompanied by entertainment. Often they celebrated religious festivals, weddings, alliances and the whims of her majesty.

== 17th century ==
England was wracked by civil war over religious issues. Prosperity generally continued in both rural areas and the growing towns, as well as the great metropolis of London.

The English Civil War was far from just a conflict between two religious faiths, and indeed it had much more to do with divisions within the one Protestant religion. The austere, fundamentalist Puritanism on the one side was opposed to what it saw as the crypto-Catholic decadence of the Anglican church on the other. Divisions also formed along the lines of the common people and the gentry, and between the country and city dwellers. It was a conflict that was bound to disturb all parts of society, and a frequent slogan of the time was "the world turned upside down".

In 1660 the Restoration was a quick transition back to the high-church Stuarts. Public opinion reacted against the puritanism of the Puritans, such as the banning of traditional pastimes of gambling, cockfights, the theatre and even Christmas celebrations. The arrival of Charles II—The Merry Monarch—brought a relief from the warlike and then strict society that people had lived in for several years. The theatre returned, along with expensive fashions such as the periwig and even more expensive commodities from overseas. The British Empire grew rapidly after 1600, and along with wealth returning to the country, expensive luxury items were also appearing. Sugar and coffee from the East Indies, tea from India and slaves (brought from Africa to the sugar colonies, along with some enslaved servants in England itself) formed the backbone of imperial trade.

One in nine Englishmen lived in London near the end of the Stuart period. However, plagues were even more deadly in a crowded city—the only remedy was to move to isolated rural areas, as Isaac Newton of Cambridge University did in 1664–66 as the Great Plague of London killed as many as 100,000 Londoners. The fast-growing metropolis was the centre of politics, high society and business. As a major port and hub of trade, goods from all over were for sale. Coffee houses were becoming the centres of business and social life, and it has also been suggested that tea might have played its own part in making Britain powerful, as the antiseptic qualities of tea allowed people to live closer together, protecting them from germs, and making the Industrial Revolution possible. These products can be considered as beginning the consumer society which promoted trade and brought development and riches to society.

Newspapers were new and soon became important tools of social discourse, and the diarists of the time such as Samuel Pepys and John Evelyn are some of the best sources we have of everyday life in Restoration England. Coffee houses grew numerous and were places for middle-class men to meet, read the papers, look over new books and gossip and share opinions. Thomas Garway operated a coffee house in London from 1657 to 1722. He sold tea, tobacco, snuff, and sandwiches. Businessmen met there informally; the first furs from the Hudson's Bay Company were auctioned there.

The diet of the poor in the 1660–1750 era was largely bread, cheese, milk, and beer, with small quantities of meat and vegetables. The more prosperous enjoyed a wide variety of food and drink, including tea, coffee, and chocolate.

=== Crime and punishment ===
Historians examining the period 1300–1800 have detected a high level of continuity in their studies of crime and punishment. They have used local records, as well as literary sources, to explore how crime was defined and detected, the changes in the court system, the central importance of elite attitudes toward the poor and dangerous classes, professional criminals, and the amateur and community element in law enforcement before the establishment of police forces in the 19th century. The Black Act 1723, sponsored by Robert Walpole, strengthened the criminal code. It specified over 200 capital crimes, many with intensified punishment. Arson, for example, was expanded to include burning or the threat of burning haystacks. The legal rights of defendants were strictly limited. For example, suspects who refused to surrender within 40 days could be summarily judged guilty and sentenced to execution if apprehended. Local villages were punished if they failed to find, prosecute and convict alleged criminals.

From the left, historians such as E. P. Thompson have emphasized that crime and disorder were characteristic responses of the working and lower classes to the oppressions imposed upon them. Thompson argues that crime was defined and punished primarily as an activity that threatened the status, property and interests of the elites. England's lower classes were kept under control by large-scale execution, transportation to the colonies, and imprisonment in horrible hulks of old warships. There was no interest in reformation, the goal being to deter through extremely harsh punishment.

== Georgian society: 1714–1837 ==
Urban-rural distribution, 1600–1801
Year	Urban	Rural non-farm	Farm
1600	8%	22%	70%
1700	17%	28%	55%
1801	28%	36%	36%
Source: E.A. Wrigley, People, Cities and Wealth (1987) p 170

=== Agriculture ===
Major advances in farming made agriculture more productive and freed up people to work in industry. The British Agricultural Revolution included innovations in technology such as Jethro Tull's seed drill which allowed greater yields, while the process of enclosure, which had been altering rural society since the Middle Ages, became unstoppable. The new mechanisation needed much larger fields – the layout of the British countryside with the patchwork of fields divided by hedgerows that we see today.

=== Industrial Revolution ===
Historians typically date the coming of the Industrial Revolution to Britain in the mid-18th century. Not only did existing cities grow but small market towns such as Manchester, Sheffield and Leeds became cities simply by weight of population. These market towns were far less self sufficient than the agricultural counties, but provided a livelihood for a greater population. Between forty or fifty towns with a population between 1,800 and 5,000 were at least partly dependent on the local industry for work.

=== Middle class and stability ===
The middle class grew rapidly in the 18th century, especially in the cities. At the top of the scale, the legal profession succeeded first, establishing specialist training and associations, and was soon followed by the medical profession. The merchant class prospered with imperial trade. Wahrman (1992) argues that the new urban elites included two types: the gentlemanly capitalist, who participated in the national society, and the independent bourgeois, who was oriented toward the local community. By the 1790s a self-proclaimed middle class, with a particular sociocultural self-perception, had emerged.

Thanks to increasing national wealth, upward mobility into the middle class, urbanisation, and civic stability, Britain was relatively calm and stable, certainly compared with the revolutions and wars which were convulsing the American colonies, France and other nations at the time. The politics of the French Revolution did not translate directly into British society to spark an equally seismic revolution, nor did the loss of the American Colonies dramatically weaken or disrupt Great Britain.

=== Religion ===
Historians have emphasized the importance of religion, including the domination of the Anglican establishment. The Act of Toleration 1689 granted rights of free religious worship to the non-conformist Protestant sects which had emerged during the Civil War. Baptists, Congregationalists, Methodists, and Quakers were all allowed to pray freely. These groups took the opportunity of the expanding empire and set up in the Thirteen Colonies, where they expanded rapidly after the First Great Awakening.

In response to the religious and moral apathy of the common people, Methodist preachers set up societies divided into classes—intimate meetings where individuals were encouraged to confess their sins to one another and to build each other up. They also took part in love feasts which allowed for the sharing of testimony and mutual surveillance of moral behavior. The success of Methodist revivals in reaching the poor and working classes concentrated their attention on spiritual goals rather than political grievances.

=== Cultural history ===
Scholars have recently been moving toward cultural history rather than social history. The language and self images of people are the chief targets of cultural studies. Of special importance is the concept of an emerging consumer society. Studies of middle- and upper-class manners, tastes, and fashions have proliferated, along with studies of gender, national, and racial identities.

=== Women in Georgian Society ===
Scholars stress that in the 18th Century, nobility found importance in open handed hospitality, and that it was crucial for the maintenance and social credibility of the nobles. “A true English hospitality” became expected, making the mistress of the house an incredibly important role.

The elite hostess may sit at the head of her dining table, a tradition which reaches back to the Sixteenth Century and survived to the Nineteenth. The idea became that the home was a refuge for social interaction from the public world.

The new social world also meant women were operating with politeness, which had directly opposed their former absolutely hospitable ways of the medieval period since polite activities allowed for the social distancing between the “elite” and “poor” social classes.

Dining rooms and parlours became spaces for cultural conversations between men and women. While women were never allowed to fully participate in the conversation, having a presence in these debates at all allowed them to be refined as individuals capable of taking part in the world of conversation.

This new attitude of politeness brought some progress, it was one that extended only to those of the higher social classes, those who could be described as gentlemen and gentlewomen- which also came with expectations. Gentlewomen were expected to be calm, have graceful control, prepared to treat others (depending on their social status), be clean, have nice table manners, and be able to divert a conversation. Every woman, however, no matter their status, was expected to be modest and chaste.

== Victorian era: 1837–1901 ==
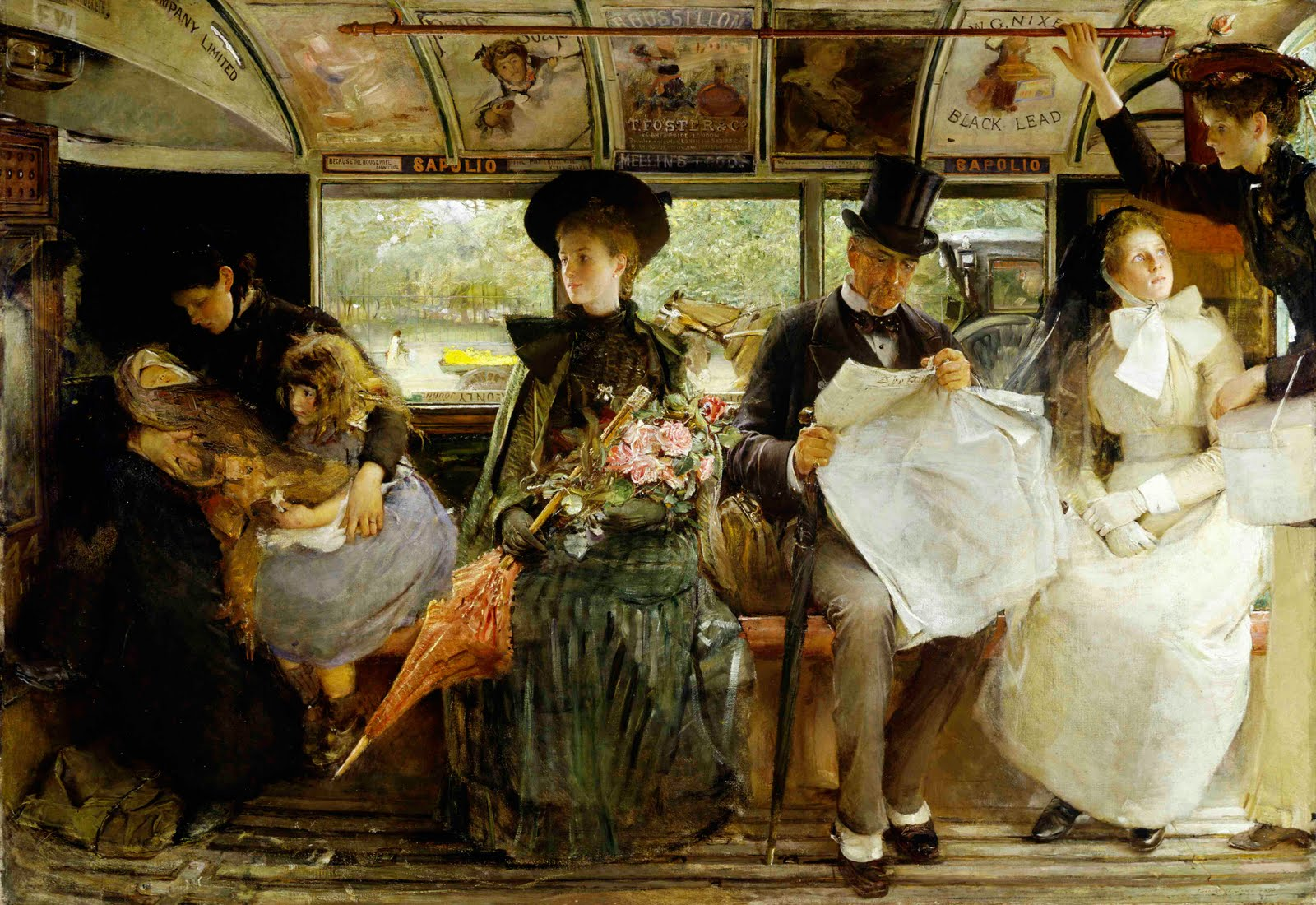
George William Joy's depiction of men and women travelling in an omnibus in the early Victorian era

The social changes during the Victorian era were wide-ranging and fundamental, leaving their mark not only upon the United Kingdom but upon much of the world which was under Britain's influence during the 19th century. It can even be argued that these changes eclipsed the massive shifts in society during the 20th century; certainly many of the developments of the 20th century have their roots in the 19th. The technology of the Industrial Revolution had a great impact on society. Inventions not only introduced new industries for employment, but the products and services produced also altered society.

Culturally there was a transition away from the rationalism of the Georgian period and toward romanticism and mysticism with regard to religion, social values, and the arts. The era is popularly associated with the "Victorian" values of social and sexual restraint.

=== Population growth and improved health ===
The population of England almost doubled from 16.8 million in 1851 to 30.5 million in 1901. Scotland's population also rose rapidly, from 2.8 million in 1851 to 4.4 million in 1901. Ireland's population decreased rapidly, from 8.2 million in 1841 to less than 4.5 million in 1901, mostly due to the Great Famine. At the same time, around 15 million emigrants left the United Kingdom in the Victorian era and settled mostly in the United States, Canada, and Australia. Not only did the rapidly expanding British Empire attract immigrants, it also attracted temporary administrators, soldiers, missionaries and businessmen who on their return talked up the Empire as a part of greater Britain.

Environmental and health standards rose throughout the Victorian era; improvements in nutrition may also have played a role, although the importance of this is debated. Sewage works were improved as was the quality of drinking water. With a healthier environment, diseases were caught less easily and did not spread as much. Technology was also improving because the population had more money to spend on medical technology (for example, techniques to prevent death in childbirth so more women and children survived), which also led to a greater number of cures for diseases. However, a cholera epidemic took place in London in 1848–49 killing 14,137, and subsequently in 1853 killing 10,738. This anomaly was attributed to the closure and replacement of cesspits by the modern sewerage systems.

=== Class identity and conflicts ===
The status of the poor is one area in which huge changes occurred. A good illustration of the differences between life in the Georgian and Victorian eras are the writings of two of England's greatest authors, Jane Austen and Charles Dickens. Both writers held a fascination for people, society and the details of everyday life but in Austen the poor are almost absent, mainly because they were still the rural poor, remote and almost absent from the minds of the middle classes. For Dickens, only a few years later, the poor were his main subject, as he had partly suffered their fate. The poor now were an unavoidable part of urban society and their existence and plight could not be ignored. Industrialisation made large profits for the entrepreneurs of the times, and their success was in contrast not only to the farm workers who were in competition with imported produce but also to the aristocracy whose landowning wealth was now becoming less significant than business wealth. The British class system created an intricate hierarchy of people which contrasted the new and old rich, the skilled and unskilled, the rural and urban and many more.

Some of the first attacks on industrialisation were the Luddites' destruction of machines, but this had less to do with factory conditions and more to do with machines mass-producing linen much quicker and cheaper than the handmade products of skilled labourers. The army was called to the areas of Luddite activity such as Lancashire and Yorkshire and for a time there were more British soldiers controlling the Luddites than fighting Napoleon in Spain. The squalid, dangerous and oppressive conditions of many of the new Victorian factories and the surrounding communities which rose to service them became important issues of discontent, and the workers began to form trade unions to get their working conditions addressed.

The first trade unions were feared and distrusted by management, and ways were devised to ban them. The most widely known case was that of the Tolpuddle Martyrs of 1834, an early attempt at a union whose members were tried on a spurious charge, found guilty and transported to Australia. The sentence was challenged and they were released shortly afterwards, but unions were still threatened. It was not until the formation of the TUC in 1868 and the passing of the Trade Union Act 1871 that union membership became reasonably legitimate. Many pieces of legislation were passed to improve working conditions, including the Ten Hours Act 1847 to reduce working hours, and these culminated in the Factory Act 1901.

=== Rural hardship ===
Many of these acts resulted from the blight of Britain's agricultural depression. Beginning in 1873 and lasting until 1896, many farmers and rural workers were hard-pressed for a stable income. With the decline in wheat prices and land productivity many countrymen were left looking for any hope of prosperity. Although the British parliament gave substantial aid to farmers and labourers, many still complained that rents were too high, wages too low, and the hours labourers were required to work were too long for their income. As a result, many workers turned to unions to have their concerns heard and, with the acts listed above as proof, were able to achieve some success.

=== Communications and travel ===
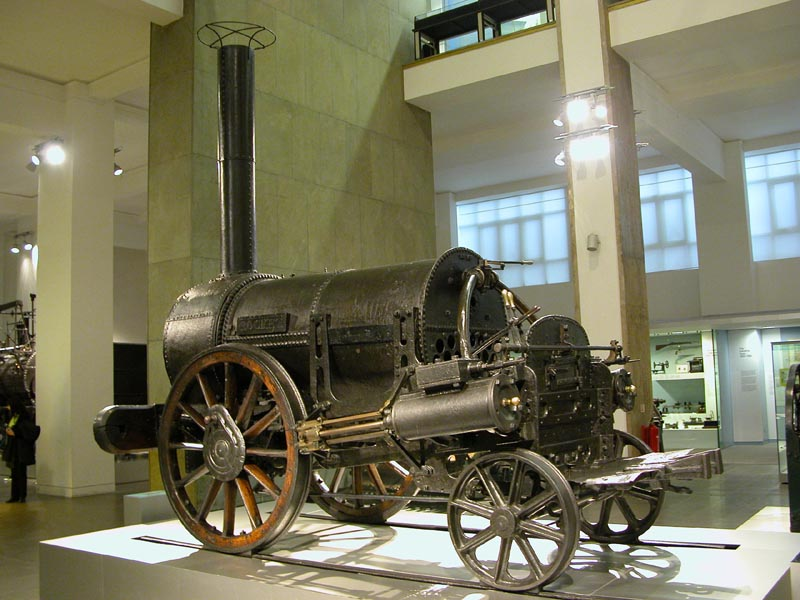
The railways changed communications and society dramatically

Communication improved rapidly. Stage coaches, canal boats, steam ships and most notably the railways all speeded up the movement of people, goods and ideas. New communication methods were very fast if not instantaneous, including the telegraph, the telephone and the trans-oceanic cable.

Trains opened up leisure destinations, especially seaside resorts. The Bank Holidays Act 1871 created a number of fixed holidays which the middle class could enjoy. Large numbers travelling to quiet fishing villages such as Worthing, Brighton, Morecambe and Scarborough began turning them into major tourist centres, and people like Thomas Cook saw arranging for domestic and foreign tourism as a viable business model. Steam ships such as the SS Great Britain and SS Great Western made international travel more common but also advanced trade, so that in Britain it was not just the luxury goods of earlier times that were imported into the country but essentials such as grain and meat from North America and Australia. One more important innovation in communications was the Penny Black, the first postage stamp, which standardised postage to a flat price regardless of distance sent.

=== Science and sanitation ===
The Victorians were impressed by science and progress, and felt that they could improve society in the same way as they were improving technology. The model town of Saltaire was founded in the 1850s, was one of several created as a planned environment with good sanitation, civic, educational and recreational facilities. It deliberately lacked a pub. Similar sanitation reforms were prompted by the Public Health Acts 1848 and 1869. Progress was made in the crowded, dirty streets of the existing cities. Soap was the main product shown in the relatively new phenomenon of advertising.

Victorians strove to improve society through many charities and relief organisations such as the Salvation Army, the RSPCA and the NSPCC. At the same time there were many people who used Florence Nightingale as a model in working to reform sanitary areas of public life.

=== Women and the family ===
Reformers organised many movements to obtain greater rights for women; voting rights did not come until the next century. The Married Women's Property Act 1882 meant that women did not lose their right to their own property when they got married and could divorce without fear of poverty, although divorce was frowned upon and very rare during the 19th century. It is too much to claim that the Victorians "invented childhood," but they deemed it the most significant phase of life. The trend was towards smaller families, probably because of the rise of modern inner-directed families, coupled with lower infant mortality rates and longer life spans. Legislation reduced the working hours of children while raising the minimum working age, and the passing of the Elementary Education Act 1870 set the basis for universal primary education.

In local government elections, unmarried women ratepayers received the right to vote in the Municipal Franchise Act 1869. This right was confirmed in the Local Government Act 1894 and extended to include some married women. By 1900, more than 1 million women were registered to vote in local government elections in England.

==== Divorce ====
In Britain before 1857 wives were under the economic and legal control of their husbands, and divorce was almost impossible. It required a very expensive private act of Parliament costing perhaps £200, of the sort only the richest could possibly afford. It was very difficult to secure divorce on the grounds of adultery, desertion, or cruelty. The first key legislative victory came with the Matrimonial Causes Act 1857, which passed over the strenuous opposition of the highly traditional Church of England. The new law made divorce a civil affair of the courts, rather than a Church matter, with a new civil court in London handling all cases. The process was still quite expensive, at about £40, but now became feasible for the middle class. A woman who obtained a judicial separation took the status of a feme sole, with full control of her own civil rights. Additional amendments came in 1878, which allowed for separations handled by local justices of the peace. The Church of England blocked further reforms until the final breakthrough came with the Matrimonial Causes Act 1973.

=== Religion ===
==== Church of England expanded roles ====
During the 19th century, the established Church of England expanded greatly at home and abroad. It enrolled about half the population, especially in rural areas where the local gentry dominated religious affairs. However it was much weaker in the fast-growing industrial cities. It lost its established status in Ireland. Its funding came largely from voluntary contributions. In England and Wales it doubled the number of active clergyman, and built or enlarged several thousand churches. Around mid-century it was consecrating seven new or rebuilt churches every month. It proudly took primary responsibility for a rapid expansion of elementary education, with parish-based schools, and diocesan-based colleges to train the necessary teachers. In the 1870s, the national government assume part of the funding; in 1880 the Church was educating 73% of all students. In addition there was a vigorous home mission, with many clergy, scripture readers, visitors, deaconesses and Anglican sisters in the rapidly growing cities. Overseas the Church kept up with the expanding Empire. It sponsored extensive missionary work, supporting 90 new bishoprics and thousands of missionaries across the globe.

In addition to local endowments and pew rentals, Church financing came from a few government grants, and especially from voluntary contributions. The result was that some old rural parishes were well funded, and most of the rapidly growing urban parishes were underfunded.

==== Evangelican and Nonconformist Protestantism ====
The start of the 19th century saw an increase in missionary work and many of the major missionary societies were founded around this time (see Timeline of Christian missions). Both the Evangelical and high church movements sponsored missionaries.

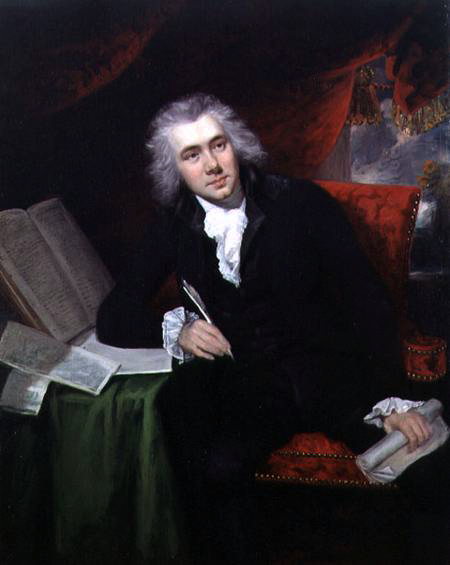
William Wilberforce was a politician, philanthropist and an evangelical Anglican, who led the British movement to abolish the slave trade.

In addition to stressing the traditional Wesleyan combination of "Bible, cross, conversion, and activism", the revivalist movement sought a universal appeal, designed to reach rich and poor, urban and rural, and men and women. They added work to keep the children their parents brought and to generate literature to spread God's message. The first evangelical megachurch, the Metropolitan Tabernacle with its 6000-seat auditorium, was launched in 1861 in London by Charles Spurgeon, a Baptist.

"Christian conscience" was the target chosen by the British Evangelical movement to promote social activism. Evangelicals believed activism in government and the social sphere was an essential method in reaching the goal of eliminating sin in a world drenched in wickedness. The Evangelicals in the Clapham Sect included figures such as William Wilberforce who successfully campaigned for the abolition of slavery.

John Nelson Darby (1800–1882) of the Plymouth Brethren was an Irish Anglican minister who devised modern dispensationalism, an innovative Protestant theological interpretation of the Bible that was incorporated in the development of modern Evangelicalism. According to scholar Mark S. Sweetnam, dispensationalism can be defined in terms of its Evangelicalism, its insistence on the literal interpretation of Scripture, its recognition of stages in God's dealings with humanity, its expectation of the imminent return of Christ to rapture His saints, and its focus on both apocalypticism and premillennialism.

==== Anti-Catholicism ====
Anti-Catholic attitudes persisted throughout the 19th century, particularly following the sudden massive Irish Catholic migration to England during the Great Famine.

The forces of anti-Catholicism were defeated by the unexpected mass mobilization of Catholic activists in Ireland, led by Daniel O'Connell. The Catholics had long been passive but now there was a clear threat of insurrection that troubled Prime Minister Wellington and his aide Robert Peel. The passage of Catholic emancipation in 1829, which allowed Catholics to sit in Parliament, opened the way for a large Irish Catholic contingent. Lord Shaftesbury (1801–1885), a prominent philanthropist, was a pre-millennial evangelical Anglican who believed in the imminent second coming of Christ, and became a leader in anti-Catholicism. He strongly opposed the Oxford Movement in the Church of England, fearful of its high church Catholics features. In 1845, he denounced the Maynooth Grant which funded the Catholic seminary in Ireland that would train many priests.

The re-establishment of the Roman Catholic ecclesiastical hierarchy in England in 1850 by Pope Pius IX, was followed by a frenzy of anti-Catholic feeling, often stoked by newspapers. Examples include an effigy of Cardinal Wiseman, the new head of the restored hierarchy, being paraded through the streets and burned on Bethnal Green, and graffiti proclaiming 'No popery!' being chalked on walls. Charles Kingsley wrote a vigorously anti-Catholic book Hypatia (1853). The novel was mainly aimed at the embattled Catholic minority in England, who had recently emerged from a half-illegal status.

New Catholic episcopates, which ran parallel to the established Anglican episcopates, and a Catholic conversion drive awakened fears of 'papal aggression' and relations between the Catholic Church and the establishment remained frosty. At the end of the nineteenth century one contemporary wrote that "the prevailing opinion of the religious people I knew and loved was that Roman Catholic worship is idolatry, and that it was better to be an Atheist than a Papist".

The Liberal party leader William Ewart Gladstone had a complex ambivalence about Catholicism. He was attracted by its international success in majestic traditions. More important, he was strongly opposed to the authoritarianism of its pope and bishops, its profound public opposition to liberalism, and its refusal to distinguish between secular allegiance on the one hand and spiritual obedience on the other. The danger came when the pope or bishops attempted to exert temporal power, as in the Vatican decrees of 1870 as the climax of the papal attempt to control churches in different nations, despite their independent nationalism. His polemical pamphlet against the infallibility declaration of the Catholic Church sold 150,000 copies in 1874. He urged Catholics to obey the crown and disobey the pope when there was disagreement. on the other hand, when religion ritualistic practices in the Church of England came under attack as too ritualistic and too much akin to Catholicism, Gladstone strongly opposed passage of the Public Worship Regulation Bill in 1874.

== Edwardian Era, 1901–1914 ==
The Edwardian Era of economic and social prosperity, and political reform, spanned the short reign of Edward VII from 1901 to 1910 as well as early reign of King George V until the start of World War I. The new king had long been the leader of the fashionable elite that set a style influenced by the art and fashions of continental Europe. Samuel Hynes described the Edwardian era as a "leisurely time when women wore picture hats and did not vote, when the rich were not ashamed to live conspicuously, and the sun never set on the British flag."

The Liberals returned to power in the 1906 landslide and made significant reforms. The era was marked by significant shifts in politics among sections of society that had largely been excluded from power, such as labourers, servants, and the industrial working class. Women started to play more of a role in politics.

=== Social change and improved health ===
Mortality declined steadily in urban England and Wales 1870–1917. Robert Millward and Frances N. Bell looked statistically at those factors in the physical environment (especially population density and overcrowding) that raised death rates directly, as well as indirect factors such as price and income movements that affected expenditures on sewers, water supplies, food, and medical staff. The statistical data show that increases in the incomes of households and increases in town tax revenues helped cause the decline of mortality.

Higher incomes on average permitted higher spending on food, and also on a wide range of health-enhancing goods and services such as medical care. The major improvement in the physical environment was the quality of the housing stock, which rose faster than the population; its quality was increasingly regulated by central and local government. Infant mortality fell faster in England and Wales than in Scotland. Clive Lee argues that one factor was the continued overcrowding in Scotland's housing.

==== Status of middle-class women ====
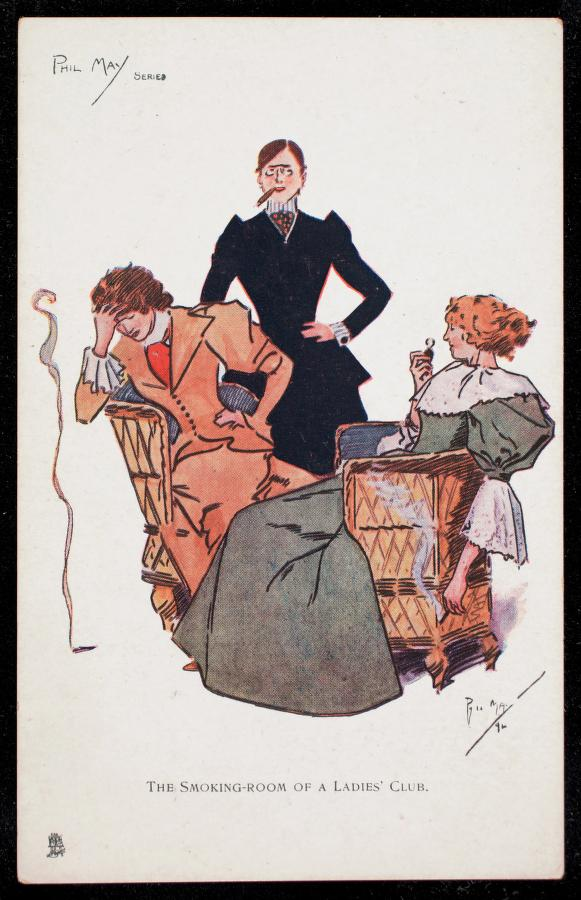
Oilette postcard with art by Phil May, published by Raphael Tuck & Sons, c. 1910s

For middle class housewives, sewing machines enabled the production of ready-made clothing and made it easier for women to sew their own clothes. More generally, argues Barbara Burman, "home dressmaking was sustained as an important aid for women negotiating wider social shifts and tensions in their lives." Increased literacy gave women wider access to information and ideas. Numerous new magazines appealed to her tastes and helped define femininity.

By 1900 Gender roles shifted as better educated young women made use of the new technology to upgrade their lifestyle and their career opportunities. The inventions of the typewriter, telephone, and new filing systems dramatically increased white collar employment opportunities. So too did the rapid expansion of the school system, and the rapid growth of the new profession of nursing. Education and status led to demands for female roles in the rapidly expanding world of sports.

Women were very active in church affairs, including attendance at services, Sunday school teaching, fund raising, pastoral care, social work and support for international missionary activities. They were almost completely excluded from leadership roles.

===== Women's suffrage =====
As middle-class women rose in status, they increasingly supported demands for a political voice.

There were numerous organisations which did their work quietly. After 1897, they were increasingly linked together by the National Union of Women's Suffrage Societies (NUWSS) led by Millicent Fawcett. However, front page publicity was seized by the Women's Social and Political Union (WSPU). Founded in 1903, it was tightly controlled by the three Pankhursts, Emmeline Pankhurst (1858–1928), and her daughters Christabel Pankhurst (1880–1958) and Sylvia Pankhurst (1882–1960).

It specialised in highly visible publicity campaigns such as large parades. This had the effect of energising all dimensions of the suffrage movement. While there was a majority of support for suffrage in Parliament, the ruling Liberal Party refused to allow a vote on the issue; the result of which was an escalation in the suffragette campaign. The WSPU, in dramatic contrast to its allies, embarked on a campaign of violence to publicise the issue, even to the detriment of its own aims.

==== Status of working-class women ====
===== Birth control and abortion =====
Although abortion was illegal, it was nevertheless a widespread form of birth control. Used predominantly by working-class women, the procedure was used not only as a means of terminating pregnancy, but also to prevent poverty and unemployment. Abortion did not need any prior planning and was less expensive. Newspaper advertisements were used to promote and sell abortifacients indirectly. Not all of society was accepting of contraceptives or abortion, and the opposition viewed both as part of one and the same sin.

===== Single mothers =====
Single mothers were the poorest sector in society, disadvantaged for at least four reasons. First, women lived longer, often leaving them widowed with children. Second, women had fewer opportunities to work, and when they did find it, their wages were lower than male workers' wages. Thirdly, women were often less likely to marry or remarry after being widowed, leaving them as the main providers for the remaining family members. Finally, poor women had deficient diets, because their husbands and children received disproportionately large shares of food. Many women were malnourished and had limited access to health care.

===== Female servants =====
Edwardian Britain had large numbers of male and female domestic servants, in both urban and rural areas. Middle- and upper-class women relied on servants to run their homes smoothly. Servants were provided with food, clothing, housing, and a small wage, and lived in a self-enclosed social system within their employer's house. However, the number of domestic servants fell in the Edwardian era due to fewer young people willing to be employed in this capacity.

=== Fashion ===
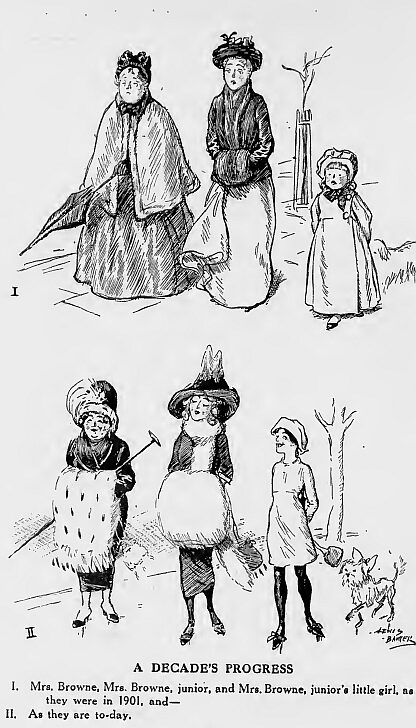
A cartoon in Punch (1911) compares changes in fashion between 1901 and 1911. "The dowdy voluminous clothes of the earlier date, making the grandmother an old lady and the mother seem plain, had been replaced by much simpler looser wear producing a sense of release for all three females."

The upper classes embraced leisure sports, which resulted in rapid developments in fashion, as more mobile and flexible clothing styles were needed. During the Edwardian era, women wore a very tight corset, or bodice, and dressed in long skirts. The Edwardian era was the last time women wore corsets in everyday life. According to Arthur Marwick, the most striking change of all the developments that occurred during the Great War was the modification in women's dress, "for, however far politicians were to put the clocks back in other steeples in the years after the war, no one ever put the lost inches back on the hems of women's skirts".

Fabrics were usually sweet pea shades in chiffon, mousse line de sore, tulle with feather boas and lace. 'High and boned collars for the day; plunging off shoulder décolleté for the evening'. The tea gown's cut was relatively loose compared to the more formal evening gown, and was worn without a corset. The silhouette was flowing, and was usually decorated with lace or with the cheaper Irish crochet.

Long kid gloves, trimmed hats, and parasols were often used as accessories. Parasols are different from umbrellas; they are used for protection from the sun, rather from the rain, though they were often used as ornamentation rather than for function. By the end of the Edwardian era, the hat grew bigger in size, a trend that would continue in the 1910s.

The Edwardians developed new styles in clothing design. The Edwardian Era saw a decrease in the trend for voluminous, heavy skirts:

- The two-piece dress came into vogue. At the start of the decade, skirts were trumpet-shaped.
- Skirts in 1901 often had decorated hems with ruffles of fabric and lace.
- Some dresses and skirts featured trains.
- Tailored jackets, first introduced in 1880, increased in popularity and by 1900, tailored suits known as tailormades became popular.
- In 1905, skirts fell in soft folds that curved in, then flared out near the hemlines.
- From 1905 – 1907, waistlines rose.
- In 1911, the hobble skirt was introduced; a tight fitting skirt that restricted a woman's stride.
- Lingerie dresses, or tea gowns made of soft fabrics, festooned with ruffles and lace were worn indoors.
- Around 1913 women's dresses acquired a lower and sometimes V-shaped neckline in contrast to the high collars a generation before. This was considered scandalous by some, and caused outrage among clergy throughout Europe.

=== Newspapers ===
The turn of the century saw the rise of popular journalism aimed at the lower middle class and tending to deemphasise highly detailed political and international news, which remain the focus of a handful of low-circulation prestige newspapers which reached a small elite. The new press, on the other hand, reached vastly larger audiences by emphasis on sports, crime, sensationalism, and gossip about famous personalities. Alfred Harmsworth, 1st Viscount Northcliffe used his Daily Mail and Daily Mirror to transform the media along the American model of "Yellow Journalism". P. P. Catterall and Colin Seymour-Ure conclude that:

More than anyone [Northcliffe] ... shaped the modern press. Developments he introduced or harnessed remain central: broad contents, exploitation of advertising revenue to subsidize prices, aggressive marketing, subordinate regional markets, independence from party control.

== Two world wars ==
=== First World War ===
What really changed all ranks of English society was the Great War. The army was traditionally a small employer; the regular army stood at only 247,000 at the start of the war. By 1918 there were five million men in the army and the fledgling Royal Air Force, newly formed from the RNAS and the RFC, was about the same size of the pre-war army. The almost three million casualties were known as the "lost generation", and such numbers inevitably left society scarred; but even so, some people felt their sacrifice was little regarded in Britain, with poems like Siegfried Sassoon's Blighters criticising the ill-informed jingoism of the home front. Conscription brought people of many different classes, and also people from all over the empire, together and this mixing was seen as a great leveller which would only accelerate social change after the war. During the World War, infant mortality fell sharply across the country. J. M. Winter attributes this to the full employment and higher wages paid to war workers.

=== 1920s ===
The social reforms of the previous century continued into the twentieth with the Labour Party being formed in 1900, but this did not achieve major success until the 1922 general election. Lloyd George said after the World War that "the nation was now in a molten state", and his Housing, Town Planning, &c. Act 1919 would lead to affordable council housing which allowed people to move out of Victorian inner-city slums. The slums, though, remained for several more years, with trams being electrified long before many houses. The Representation of the People Act 1918 gave women householders the vote, and in 1928 full equal suffrage was achieved.

After the War, many new food products became available to the typical household, with branded foods advertised for their convenience. The shortage of servants was felt in the kitchen, but now instead of an experience cook spending hours on difficult custards and puddings the ordinary housewife working alone could purchase instant foods in jars, or powders that could be quickly mixed. Breakfast porridge from branded, more finely milled, oats could now be cooked in two minutes, not 20. American-style dry cereals began to challenge the porridge and bacon and eggs of the middle classes, and the bread and margarine of the poor. Street vendors were fewer. Shops were upgraded; the flies were gone as were the open barrels of biscuits and pickles. Groceries and butcher shops carried more bottled and canned goods as well as fresher meat, fish and vegetables. Whereas wartime shipping shortages had sharply narrowed choices, the 1920s saw many new kinds of foods—especially fruits—imported from around the world, along with better quality, packaging, and hygiene. Middle classes households now had ice boxes or electric refrigerators, which made for better storage and the convenience of buying in larger quantities.

=== Great Depression ===
The relatively prosperous 1920s gave way by 1930 to a depression that was part of a worldwide crisis.

Particularly hardest hit were the north of England and Wales, where unemployment reached 70% in some areas. The General Strike was called during 1926 in support of the miners and their falling wages, but it failed. The strike marked the start of the slow decline of the British coal industry. In 1936 two hundred unemployed men walked from Jarrow to London in a bid to show the plight of the industrial poor, but the Jarrow March, had little impact and it was not until 1940 that industrial prospects improved. George Orwell's book The Road to Wigan Pier gives a bleak overview of the hardships of the time.

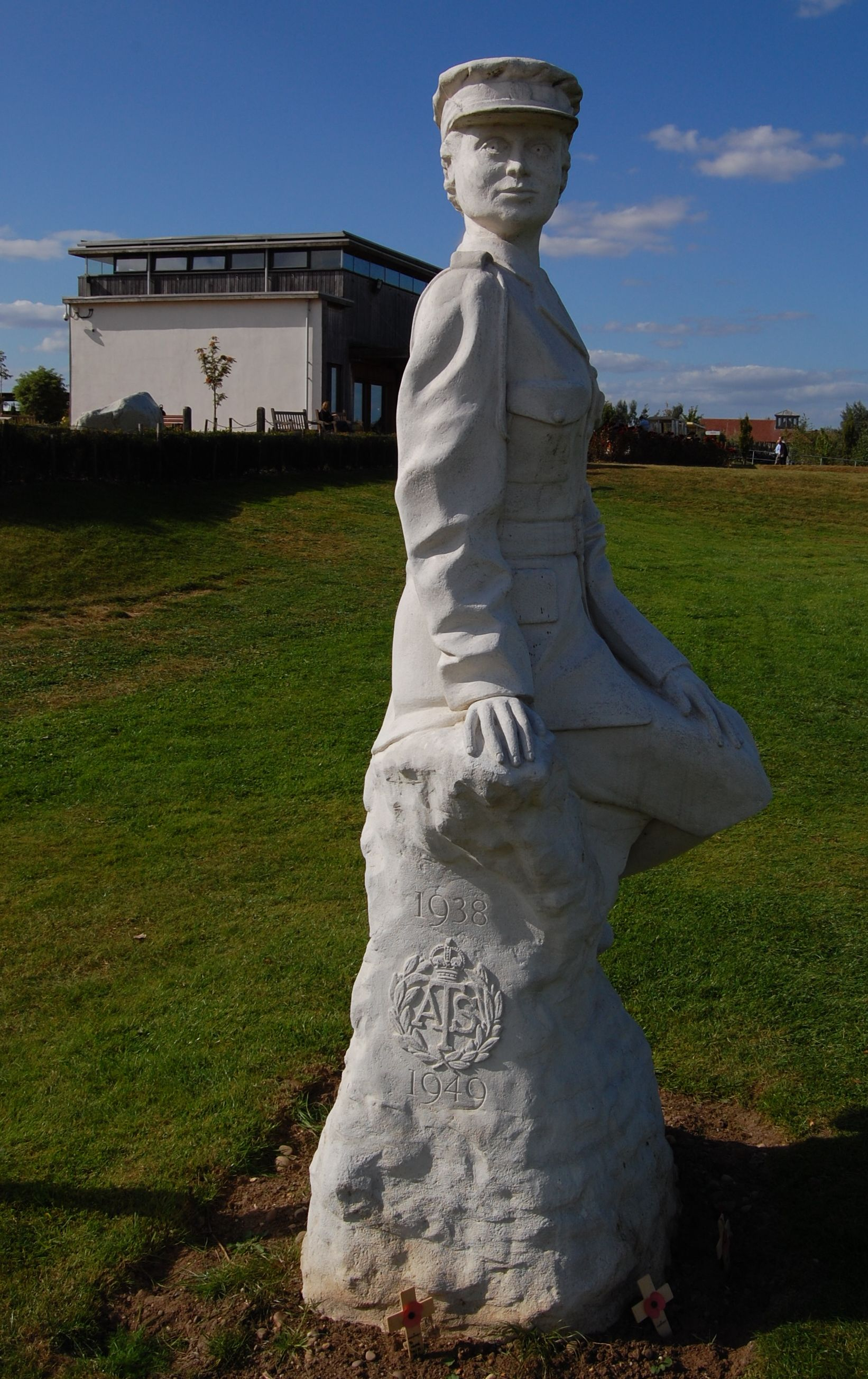
An ATS memorial at the National Memorial Arboretum.

=== People's War: 1939–1945 ===
The war was a "people's war" that enlisted every party, class and every region and every interest, with strikingly little dissent. It was started with a "phony war" with little fighting. Fear of bombing led to women and children were moved from London and other cities liable to air raids and evacuated to the country. Most returned some months later and remained in the cities until the end of the war. There were half the number of military casualties in this war than the last, but the improvements in aerial warfare meant that there were many more civilian casualties and a foreign war seemed much closer to home. The early years of the war in which Britain "stood alone" and the Blitz spirit which developed as Britain suffered under aerial bombardment helped pull the nation together after the divisions of the previous decade, and campaigns such as "Dig for Victory" helped give the nation a common purpose. The focus on agriculture to feed the nation gave some people their first introduction to the countryside, and women played an important part in the war effort as the Land Girls.

A half a million women served in the armed forces, led by Princess Elizabeth, the future queen, who donned the ATS soldier's uniform as a lorry driver.

== Since 1945 ==
=== Austerity: 1945–1951 ===
The Labour Party victory in 1945 represented pent-up frustrations. The strong sense that all Britons had joined in a "People's War" and all deserved a reward animated voters. But the Treasury was near bankruptcy and Labour's nationalization programs were expensive. Prewar levels of prosperity did not return until the 1950s. It was called the Age of Austerity. The most important reform was the founding of the National Health Service on 5 July 1948. It promised to give cradle to grave care for everyone in the country, regardless of income.

Wartime rationing continued, and was extended to bread. In the war the government banned ice cream and rationed sweets, such as chocolates and confections; sweets were rationed until 1954. Most people grumbled, but for the poorest, rationing was beneficial, because their rationed diet was of greater nutritional value than their pre-war diet. Housewives organized to oppose the austerity. The Conservatives saw their opening and rebuilt their fortunes by attacking socialism, austerity, rationing, and economic controls, and were back in power by 1951.

=== Prosperous 1950s ===
As prosperity returned after 1950, Britons became more family centred. Leisure activities became more accessible to more people after the war. Holiday camps, which had first opened in the 1930s, became popular holiday destinations in the 1950s – and people increasingly had money to pursue their personal hobbies. The BBC's early television service was given a major boost in 1953 with the coronation of Elizabeth II, attracting an estimated audience of twenty million, proving an impetus for middle-class people to buy televisions. In 1950 1% owned television sets; by 1965 75% did. As austerity receded after 1950 and consumer demand kept growing, the Labour Party hurt itself by shunning consumerism as the antithesis of the socialism it demanded.

Small neighbourhood stores were increasingly replaced by chain stores and shopping centres, with their wide variety of goods, smart-advertising, and frequent sales. Cars were becoming a significant part of British life, with city-centre congestion and ribbon developments springing up along many of the major roads. These problems led to the idea of the green belt to protect the countryside, which was at risk from development of new housing units.

=== 1960s ===
The 1960s saw dramatic shifts in attitudes and values led by youth. It was a worldwide phenomenon, in which British rock musicians, especially The Beatles, played an international role. The generations divided sharply regarding the new sexual freedom demanded by youth who listened to bands like The Rolling Stones.

Sexual morals shifted towards greater acceptance of sexual behaviors and identities that had been considered taboo or immoral. One notable event was the publication of D. H. Lawrence's Lady Chatterley's Lover by Penguin Books in 1960. Although first printed in 1928, the release in 1960 of an inexpensive mass-market paperback version prompted a court case. The prosecuting council's question, "Would you want your wife or servants to read this book?" highlighted how far society had changed, and how little some people had noticed. The book was seen as one of the first events in a general relaxation of sexual attitudes. Other elements of the sexual revolution included the development of The Pill, Mary Quant's miniskirt and the 1967 legalisation of homosexuality. There was a rise in the incidence of divorce and abortion, and a resurgence of the women's liberation movement, whose campaigning helped secure the Equal Pay Act and the Sex Discrimination Act in 1975.

The 1960s were a time of greater disregard for the establishment, with a satire boom led by people who were willing to attack their elders. Pop music became a dominant form of expression for the young, and bands like the Beatles and the Rolling Stones were seen as leaders of youth culture. Youth-based subcultures such as the mods, rockers, hippies and skinheads became more visible.

Reforms in education led to the effective elimination of the grammar school. The rise of the comprehensive school was aimed at producing a more egalitarian educational system, and there were ever-increasing numbers of people going into higher education.

In the 1950s and 1960s, immigration of people to the United Kingdom, mainly from former British colonies in the Caribbean, India and Pakistan, began to escalate, leading to racism. Dire predictions were made about the effect of these new arrivals on British society (most famously Enoch Powell's Rivers of Blood speech), and tension led to a few race riots. In the longer term, many people with differing cultures have successfully integrated into the country, and some have risen to high positions.

=== 1980s ===
One important change during the 1980s was the opportunity given to many to buy their council houses, which resulted in many more people becoming property owners in a stakeholder society. At the same time, Conservative Margaret Thatcher weakened her bitter enemy, the trade unions.

The environmentalism movements of the 1980s reduced the emphasis on intensive farming, and promoted organic farming and conservation of the countryside.

Religious observance declined notably in Britain during the second half of the 20th century, even with the growth of non-Christian religions due to immigration and travel (see Islam in the UK). Church of England attendance has particularly dropped, although charismatic churches like Elim and AOG are growing. The movement to Keep Sunday Special seemed to have lost at the beginning of the 21st century.

=== 1990s and the new millennium ===
Following on from the resurgence of economic liberalism in the 1980s, the last decade of the 20th century was noted for a greater embrace of social liberalism within British society, largely attributed to the greater influence of the generation born in the socially transformative 1960s. In 1990, 69% of Britons surveyed believed homosexuality was morally wrong; by the end of the decade this had fallen to below half, and the legal age of consent for homosexual sexual activity had been lowered to 16, in line with heterosexual sex.

The death of Diana, Princess of Wales in 1997 was also observed to have demonstrated the way in which social attitudes towards mourning had changed, with the unprecedented mass public outpourings of grief that characterised the days after her death being remarked upon as reflecting a change in the national psyche.

Growing disparity in the relative affluence of those who have benefitted and those 'left behind' from the deindustrialisation and globalisation of the economy was attributed as one of the primary factors behind the surprise victory of the 'leave' campaign in the 2016 European Union membership referendum, and began wider discourse on the emergence of 'two countries' within England that represented greatly differing social attitudes and outlooks.

== Historiography ==
The social history of the medieval period was primarily developed by Eileen Power, H. S. Bennett, Ambrose Raftis, Rodney Hilton, and Sylvia Thrupp before the rise of the New Social History in the 1960s.

Burchardt (2007) evaluates the state of English rural history and focuses on an "orthodox" school dealing chiefly with the economic history of agriculture. The orthodox historians made "impressive progress" in quantifying and explaining the growth of output and productivity since the agricultural revolution. A challenge came from a dissident tradition that looked chiefly at the negative social costs of agricultural progress, especially enclosure. In the late 20th century there arose a new school, associated with the journal Rural History. Led by Alun Howkins, it links rural Britain to a wider social history. Burchardt calls for a new countryside history, paying more attention to the cultural and representational aspects that shaped 20th-century rural life.

== See also ==
- Economic history of the United Kingdom, after 1700
- History of women in the United Kingdom
- History of the United Kingdom (1945–present)
