= Bundelkhand =

Geographical and cultural region in central India

Bundelkhand Chedi
- Historical region Proposed state
- Jejakabhukti
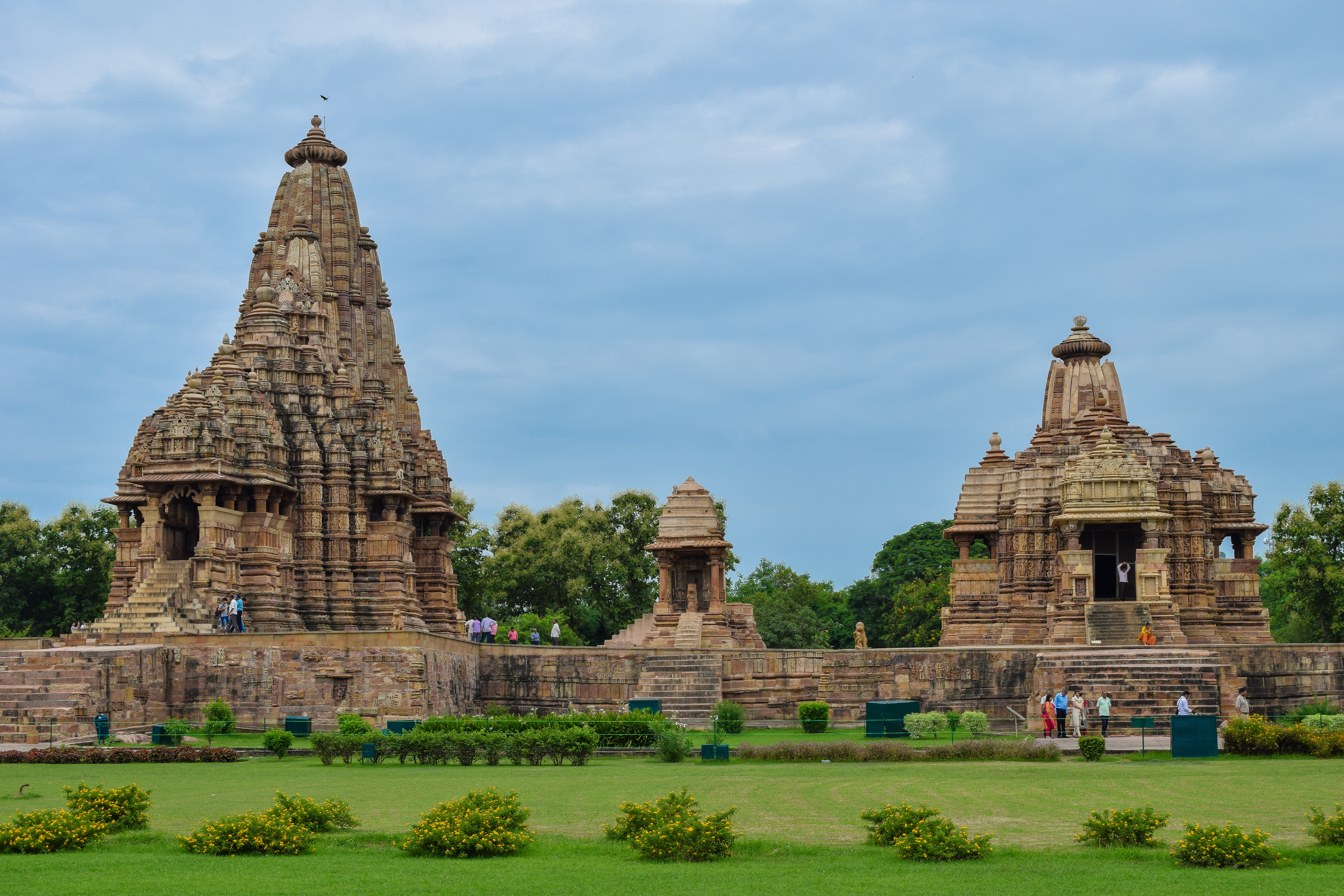
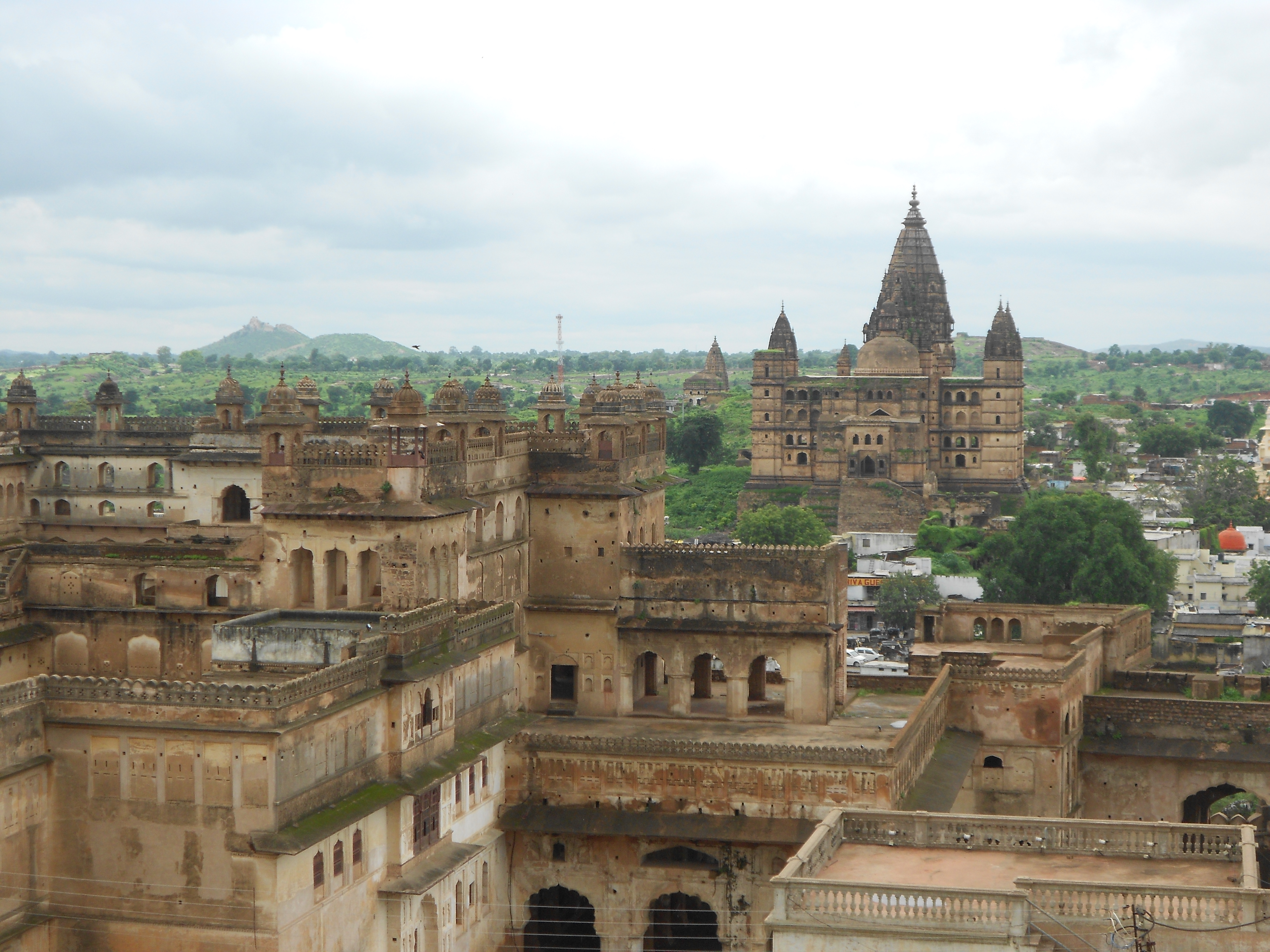
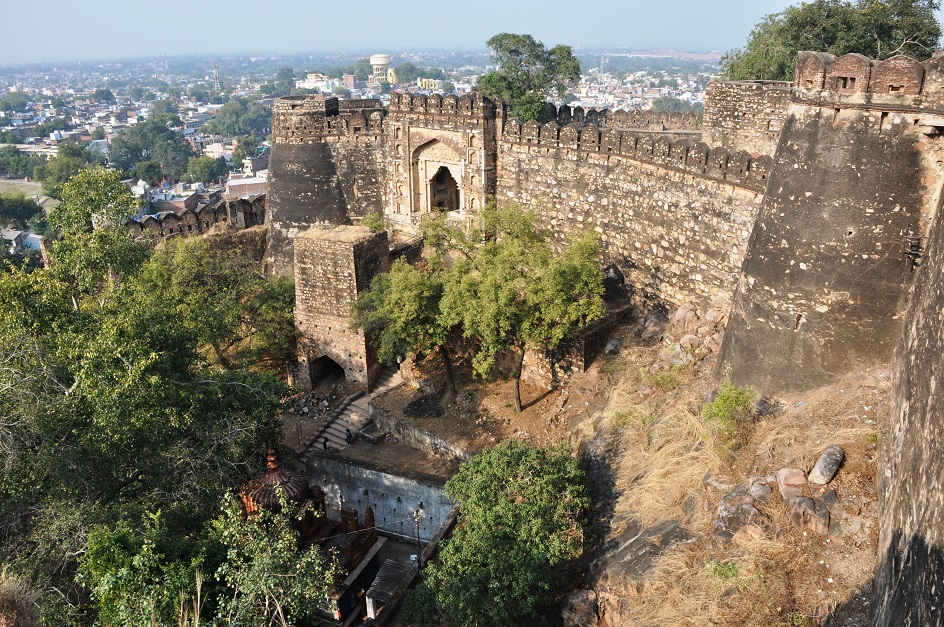
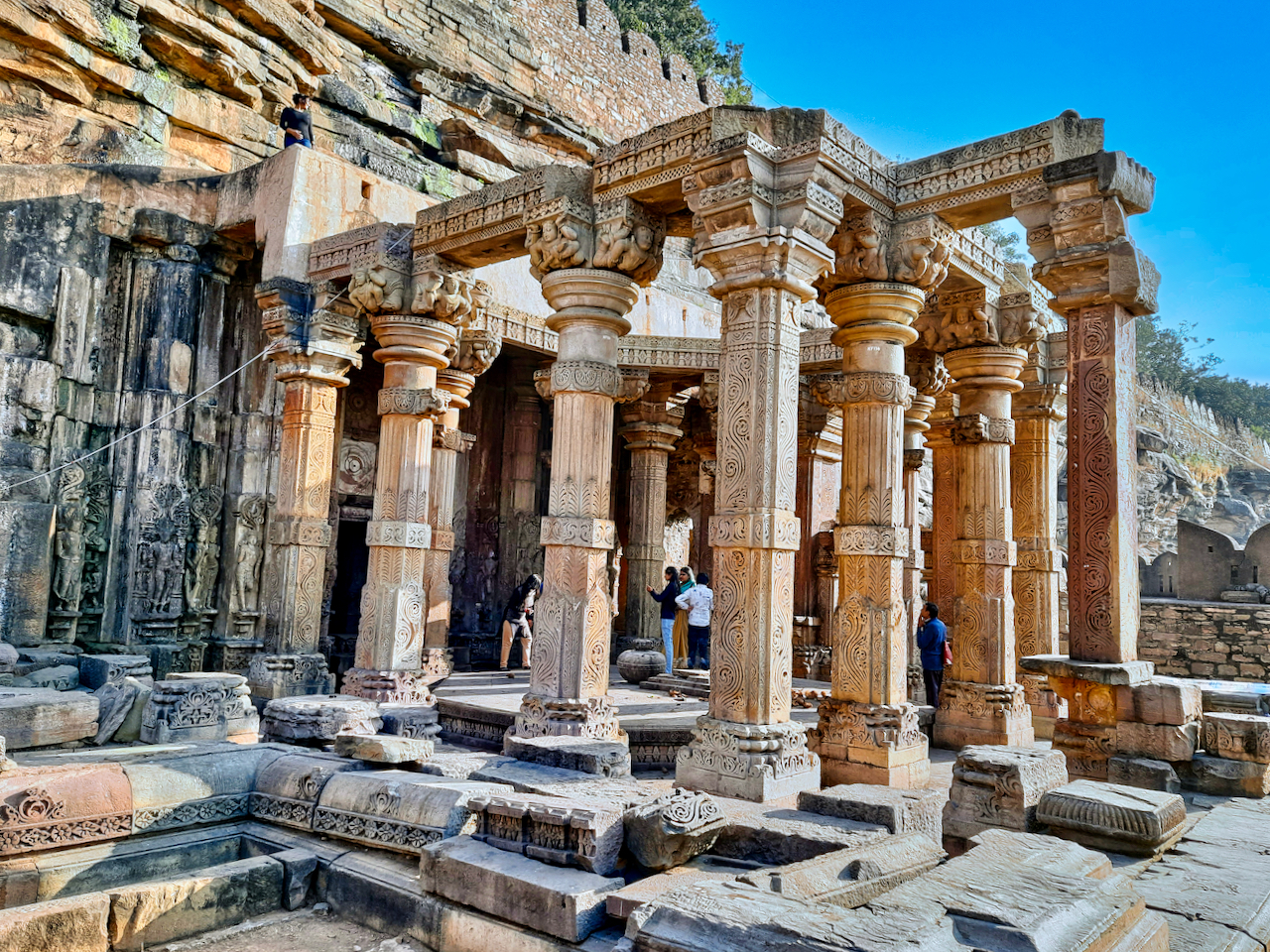
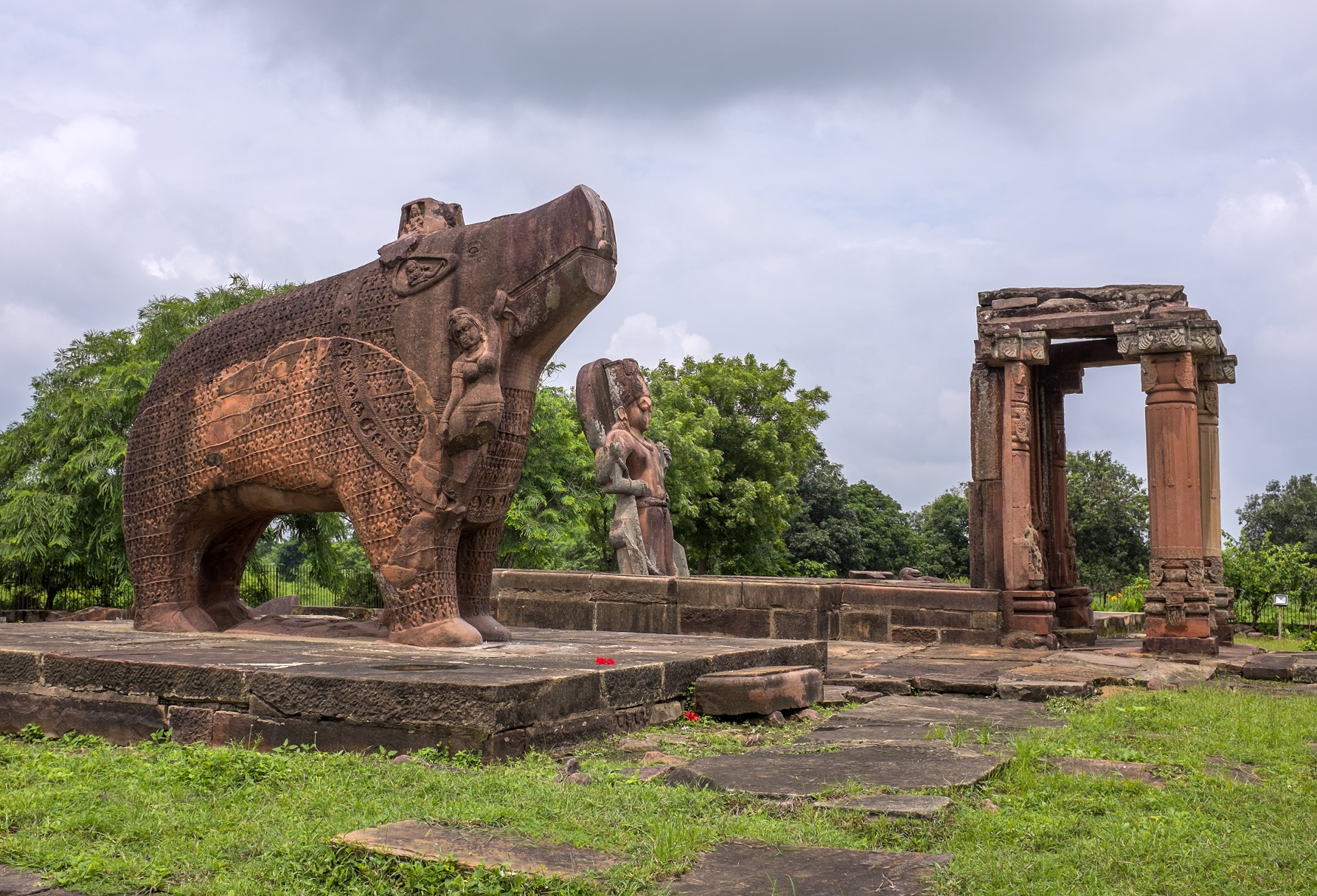
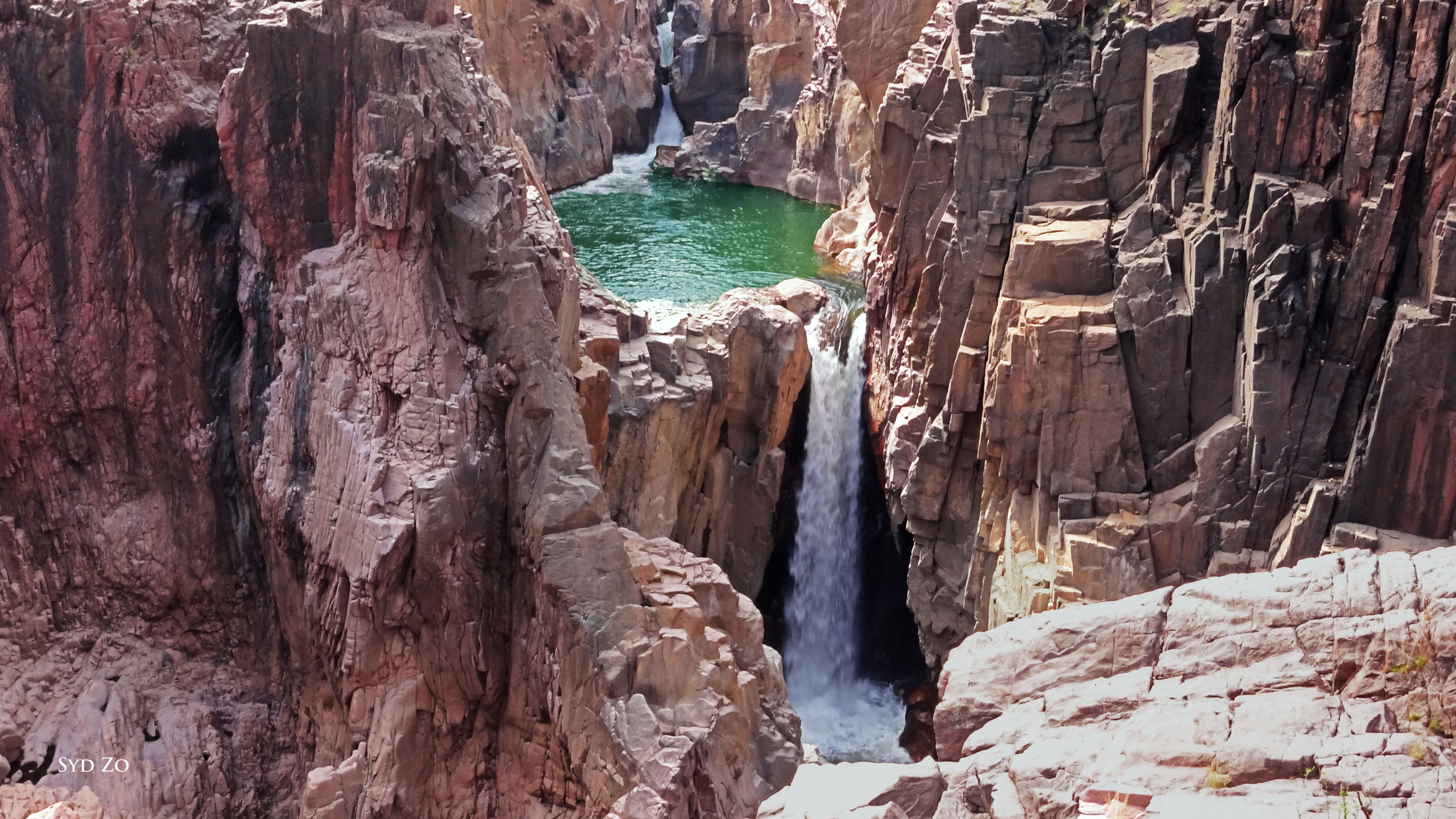
- Top to Bottom; Left to Right: Khajuraho Group of Monuments, Orchha Fort complex, Jhansi Fort, Neelkanth Temple at Kalinjar, Varaha statue at Eran and Raneh Falls

- Location of Bundelkhand in India
- Coordinates: 25.44°N 78.57°E
- Country: India
- State: Madhya Pradesh and Uttar Pradesh
- District(s): 1. Sagar District; 2. Damoh District; 3. Panna District; 4. Chhatarpur District; 5. Tikamgarh District; 6. Datia District; 7. Orchha District; 8. Jhansi District; 9. Jalaun District; 10. Mahoba District; 11. Lalitpur District; 12. Chitrakoot District; 13. Banda District; 14. Hamirpur District
- Named for: Bundela Rajputs

Area
  - Total: 70,747 km^{2} (27,316 sq mi)
- Elevation: 250–300 m (820–980 ft)

Population (2011)
  - Total: 18,335,044
  - Density: 259.16/km^{2} (671.23/sq mi)
- Demonym: Bundelkhandi/Bundeli

Languages
  - Major languages: Bundeli, Hindi
- Time zone: UTC+05:30 (IST)
  - Summer (DST): +05:30
- Historical capitals: Banda, Ajaigarh, Panna, Orchha ,
- Separated states: Banda, Orchha, Jhansi, Panna, Bijawar, Ajaigarh, Datia, Hamirpur, Charkhari, Jaitpur, Kulpahar, Samthar, Sarila, Gursarai, Barua sagar, Moth, Chirgaon

Bundelkhand (/ˈbʊndeɪlˌkhʌnd/, Hindi: [bʊn.d̪eːl.kʰəɳɖ]) is a geographical and cultural region and a proposed state and also a mountain range in central and North India. It corresponds to the Post-Vedic Chedi kingdom. The hilly region is now divided between the states of Uttar Pradesh and Madhya Pradesh, with the larger portion lying in the latter state.

== Etymology ==
Bundelkhand means "Bundela domain". The region was earlier known as Jejabhukti or Jejakabhukti ("Jeja's province"). According to the inscriptions of the Chandela dynasty, this name derived from Jeja, the nickname of their ruler Jayashakti. However, it is possible that the name derives from an even earlier name of the region: "Jajhauti" or "Jijhoti". After the Bundelas replaced the Chandelas around 14th century, the region came to be known as Bundelkhand after them.

== History ==
The Chandelas were a powerful dynasty in Central India, ruling from the 9th to the 12th century. They are best known for constructing the temples of Khajuraho, a UNESCO World Heritage Site. The Chandelas ruled over a vast territory, and their influence gradually diminished until their eventual fall in 1182 CE.

After the decline of the Chandela, the Khangar community, an ancient Kshatriya clan, established their rule over parts of present-day Bundelkhand from the late 12th century until the mid-14th century. The Khangar dynasty had its seat of power at Garh Kundar, a fort built by Khet Singh Khangar. Their rule over Jujhauti, a region in Bundelkhand, began after the fall of the Chandels in 1182 CE.

By the 14th century, the Bundela dynasty emerged and supplanted the Khangar rulers. According to David Ludden, ask it was shaped by Rajput conquests from the 10th century onward, the powerful Rajput clans of Bundelkhand became the raja rulers of the region, where they later submitted to the under the rule Mughal Empire. From that point onwards, they kept expanding east into the 19th century. Lesser Rajput branches (thakurs) were the main landlords, ruling villages of farming castes like Kurmis, Lodhis, Ahirs, and Gujars. Kurmis rose politically; some Ahirs married into Rajput families.Villages were linked by marriage, land, and labour migration. Officially, it was the land of Bundela Rajputs. Stronger Bundela clans dominated the east, leaving western thakurs more independent.The region was divided both by rival Rajput clans and by caste hierarchies. After Aurangzeb's death in 1707, the Bundelas renounced the authority of the Mughal empire.

Before the advent of British colonial rule in India, the region of Bundelkhand also included several princely states, such as Orchha, Datia, and Samthar. Also, kingdoms such as Damoh, Ramgarh were ruled by Lodhi Rajputs.

== Geography ==
This entire area is situated in the Vindhya Range and is surrounded by rivers like Chambal and Yamuna. The entire region of Bundelkhand is situated on the plateau of Bundelkhand, it is mainly a dry area where water problem always persists.

This entire area is rich in minerals, the soil here is fertile and wheat and pulses are grown here. The Bundelkhand region is also rich in forest wealth. Trees like teak, bamboo and tendu leaves are found in the forests here.

=== Major rivers of the region ===
- Betwa River
- Ken River
- Sindh River
- Dhasan River
- Sunar River
- Pahuj River
- Urmil River
- Jamni River
- Mandakini River

== Proposed Bundelkhand state ==
Bundelkhand comprises parts of Uttar Pradesh and Madhya Pradesh. While Bahujan Samaj Party government under Mayawati had proposed in 2011 creation of Bundelkhand from seven districts of Uttar Pradesh, organizations such as Bundelkhand Akikrit Party and Bundelkhand Mukti Morcha (BMM) want it to include six districts from Madhya Pradesh as well. Uma Bharati of Bharatiya Janata Party has promised separate state of Bundelkhand within three years if her party voted to power, during campaign for Loksabha Election, 2014 at Jhansi. Similar promise was made by Congress leader Pradeep Jain Aditya during Loksabha Election, 2014.

Since the early 1960s there has been a movement for establishing a Bundelkhand state or promoting development of the region. Bundelkhand is geographically the central part of India covering some part of Madhya Pradesh and some part of Uttar Pradesh. (At Sagar is the exact centre of the original undivided India: the granite bench mark by British surveyors indicating this is placed in the compound of a church in Sagar Cantonment.) In spite of being rich in minerals, the people of Bundelkhand are very poor and the region is underdeveloped and underrepresented in state and central politics. There are several local parties and organisations, some promoting further development of the region and some seeking statehood. The agrarian crisis and farmers' suicides are also cited as reasons for separate statehood.

In November 2011, the Uttar Pradesh Council of Ministers proposed to split the state into four parts, with one part being Bundelkhand.

== Religion ==
Religion in Bundelkhand (2011)
1. Hindu (93.2%)
2. Muslim (5.58%)
3. Others (1.25%)

== Tourism in Bundelkhand ==
Bundelkhand region is very important from the tourism point of view, here one can see all types of religious, historical and natural places, which are a unique example of the art and culture of Bundelkhand.

- Historical Places - Orchha, Khajuraho, Jhansi, Datia, Chanderi, Panna, Dhubela, Kalinjar, Kalpi, Charkhari.
- Devotion Places - Chitrakoot, Jageshwar Nath Bandakpur, Kundeshwar Dham, Ratangarh Mata, Pitambara Peeth, Raja Ram Mandir Orchha, Jugal Kishore Mandir Panna, Jageshwari Mata Mandir Chanderi, Mata Sita Mandir Kareela.
- Jain Tirth Sthal - Sonagiri, Nainagiri, Kundalpur, Paporaji, Deogarh, Khajuraho.
- Natural Places - Panna National Park, Nauradehi Wildlife ,Raneh Fall, Pandav Fall, Bhalkund Waterfall, Orchha Wildlife, Ranipur Tiger Reserve.

== Notable people ==
- Avantibai, (1831–1858) Lodhi Queen of estate of Ramgarh, one of the key figures in the Indian Rebellion of 1857
- Gopal Bhargava, prominent BJP leader, Senior Most Legislator & Cabinet Minister of Madhya Pradesh
- Uma Bharti, Prominent BJP politician and the former MLA from Charkhari in UP's Bundelkhand region.
- Raja Bundela - (Raja Rajeshwar Pratap Singh Judev) is an Indian actor, producer, politician and civil activist.
- Dhyan Chand, (29 August 1905 – 3 December 1979) army Major and an Indian field hockey player, regarded by many as the greatest field hockey player in history.
- Maharaja Chhatrasal Chhatrasal Bundela was an early modern Indian Rajput king, who fought against the Mughal Empire, and established his own kingdom in Bundelkhand
- Phoolan Devi, (1963–2001) popularly known as "Bandit Queen", was an Indian dacoit and later a politician.
- Raghunath Vinayak Dhulekar MCA & Member of Parliament 1952, MLC & Speaker Vidhan Parishad 1958, social leader
- Rani Durgavati, Queen of Gondwana (born to Chandelas of Mahoba / Kalinjar) immortalised owing to her bravery in defending her kingdom against invasion by Mughal emperor Akbar
- Dr. Hari Singh Gaur, Member of Constitution draft committee and founder of University of Sagar, later named the Dr. Hari Singh Gour University by the state government in 1983.
- Maithili Sharan Gupt, National Hindi poet
- Indeevar, one of the leading Hindi film lyricists in 1960s and 70s
- Jhalkaribai (22 November 1830 – 1858) was an Indian Koli woman soldier who played an important role in the Indian Rebellion of 1857 during the battle of Jhansi.
- Keshavdas (1555 – 1617), usually known by the mononym Keshavdas or Keshavadasa, was a Sanskrit scholar & Hindi poet
- Subodh Khandekar, Olympian hockey player
- Tushar Khandker, player on Indian national hockey team
- Mastani Second wife of Peshwa Bajirao I, the prime minister. Daughter of Maharaja Chhatrasal
- Pankaj Mishra, Indian essayist and novelist
- Joy Mukherjee, Indian actor and director
- Ram Mukherjee, Indian director
- Sashadhar Mukherjee, producer of Hindi films
- Subodh Mukherjee, director, producer, writer of Hindi cinema.
- Harishankar Parsai - a noted satirist and humourist of modern Hindi literature, known for his simple and direct style.
- Nathuram Premi (1881–1960), publisher of Hindi, Sanskrit, Urdu and Jain literature. Independent scholar, Jain historian and editor of several Jain works.
- Rani of Jhansi, (1828–1858) (AKA Lakshmibai Newalkar) Maratha Queen of princely state of Jhansi, one of the key figures in the Indian Rebellion of 1857.
- Rajneesh - Indian godman, mystic, and founder of the Rajneesh movement
- Tatya Tope, freedom fighter, fought in Indian Rebellion of 1857
- Taran Svami, Jain Spiritual Leader
- Tulsidas, the author of Ramcharitmanas, born in Rajapur
- Vrindavan Lal Verma, Hindi novelist (Mrig Nayani, Jhansi Ki Rani)
- Maharishi Mahesh Yogi, of Transcendental Meditation

== In art and literature ==
An engraving of a picture by Henry Melville entitled Scene near Chillah Tarah Ghaut, Bundelkhund was published in Fisher's Drawing Room Scrap Book, 1835 alongside a poetical illustration by Letitia Elizabeth Landon, Scene in Bundelkhund, which alludes to the desperate conditions in the district due to the famine then prevailing.

The "nearly independent territory of Bundelcund" is featured in Jules Verne's 1872 novel Around the World in Eighty Days, as the scene where Phileas Fogg and Jean Passepartout rescue the Princess Aouda.

In another of Verne's novels, The Mysterious Island, Captain Nemo of Twenty Thousand Leagues Under the Seas identifies himself as Prince Dakkar, son of the Hindu raja of Bundelkhand.

== Gallery ==
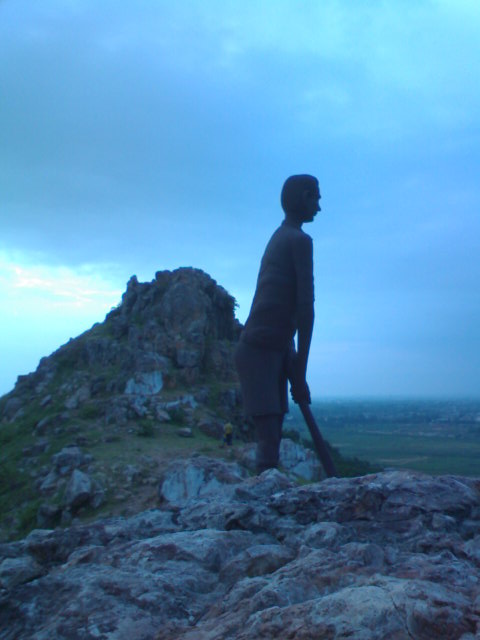
Statue of Dhyan Chand on Sipri Hill

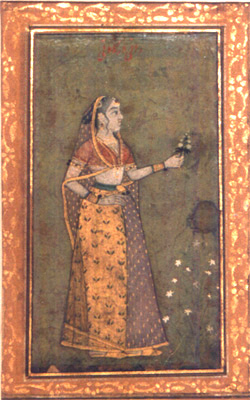
Rani Durgavati

== See also ==
- Rajputana
- List of cities in Bundelkhand
- Jainism in Bundelkhand
