= Subodh =

Subodh may refer to

- Subodh Bhave, Marathi actor
- Subodh Banarjee, Indian politician
- Subodh Chandra Mallik, Indian industrialist
- Subodh College, a college in Jaipur
- Subodh Das (politician), Indian politician
- Subodh Das, Indian scientist
- Subodh Ghosh, Indian journalist
- Subodh Gupta, Indian artist
- Subodh Kant Sahay, Indian politician
- Subodh Khandekar, Indian hockey player
- Subodh Mitra, Indian doctor
- Subodh Patnaik, Indian scriptwriter
- Subodh Patnaik (theatre director), Indian theatre director and playwright
- Subodh Roy, Indian freedom fighter
- Subodh Sarkar, Bengali poet
- Subodh Sen, Indian politician
- Subodh Srivastava, Indian costume designer
- Subodh Oraon, Indian politician
- Subodh Markandeya, Indian lawyer
- Subodh Roy (politician), Indian politician
- Subodh, fictional character in the 2001 Indian film Dil Chahta Hai
