= Histoire & Sociétés Rurales =

- Discipline: History
- Language: French

Publication details
- History: 1994-present
- Publisher: Association d'Histoire des Sociétés Rurales (France)
- Frequency: Biannually

Standard abbreviations
- ISO 4: Hist. Soc. Rural.

Indexing
- ISSN: 1254-728X (print); 1950-666X (web)
- LCCN: 95641993
- OCLC no.: 183200844

Links
- Journal homepage; Online access; Alternative access

Histoire & Sociétés Rurales (History and Rural Societies) is an academic journal dedicated to rural history from prehistory to the present day. It was established in 1994 and is published biannually by the Association d'Histoire des Sociétés Rurales.
