= Rural history =

Field of historiographical study

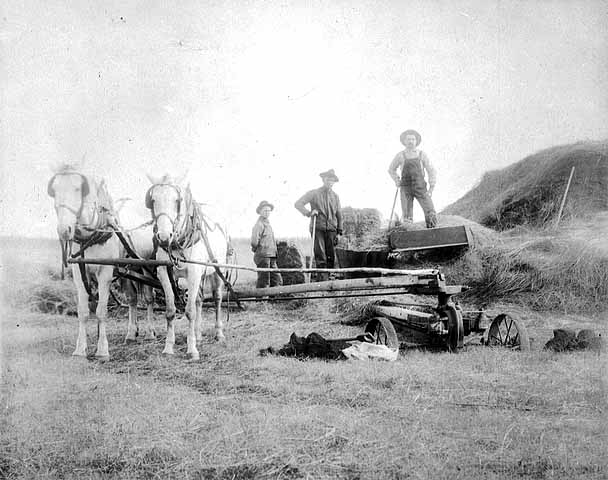
Baling straw, ca. 1900

In historiography, rural history is a field of study focusing on the history of societies in rural areas. At its inception, the field was based on the economic history of agriculture. Since the 1980s it has become increasingly influenced by social history and has diverged from the economic and technological focuses of "agricultural history". It is a counterpart to urban history.

A number of academic journals and learned societies exist to promote rural history.

== History ==
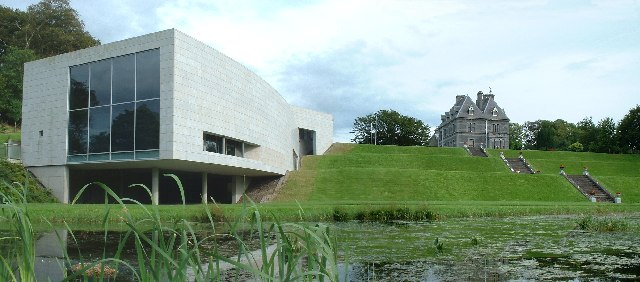
National Museum of Ireland – Country Life, Ireland

Rural history emerged as a distinct discipline from agricultural history in the 1980s and was inspired by the French Annales school which favoured integrating economic, social and political history. Initially focused predominantly on the social history of rural life and later became increasingly interested in cultural history.

In Europe, the study of rural history is supported by the European Rural History Organisation (ERHO).

== National studies ==
=== Britain ===
Burchardt (2007) evaluates the state of English rural history and focuses on an "orthodox" school dealing chiefly with the economic history of agriculture. The orthodox historians made "impressive progress" in quantifying and explaining the growth of output and productivity since the agricultural revolution. A challenge came from a dissident tradition that looked chiefly at the negative social costs of agricultural progress, especially enclosure. In the late 20th century there arose a new school, associated with the journal Rural History. Led by Alun Howkins, it links rural Britain to a wider social history. Burchardt calls for a new countryside history, paying more attention to the cultural and representational aspects that shaped 20th-century rural life.

=== United States ===
In the U.S. most rural history has focused on the South—overwhelmingly rural until the 1950s—but there is a "new rural history" of the North as well. Instead of becoming agrarian capitalists, farmers held onto preindustrial capitalist values emphasizing family and community. Rural areas maintained population stability; kinship ties determined rural immigrant settlement and community structures; and the defeminization of farm work encouraged the rural version of the "women's sphere." These findings strongly contrast with those in the old frontier history as well as those found in the new urban history.

Modernization came in the 20th century, with the arrival of mechanization, the model T, better roads, and the agricultural agent—as well as electricity, and radio.

=== France ===
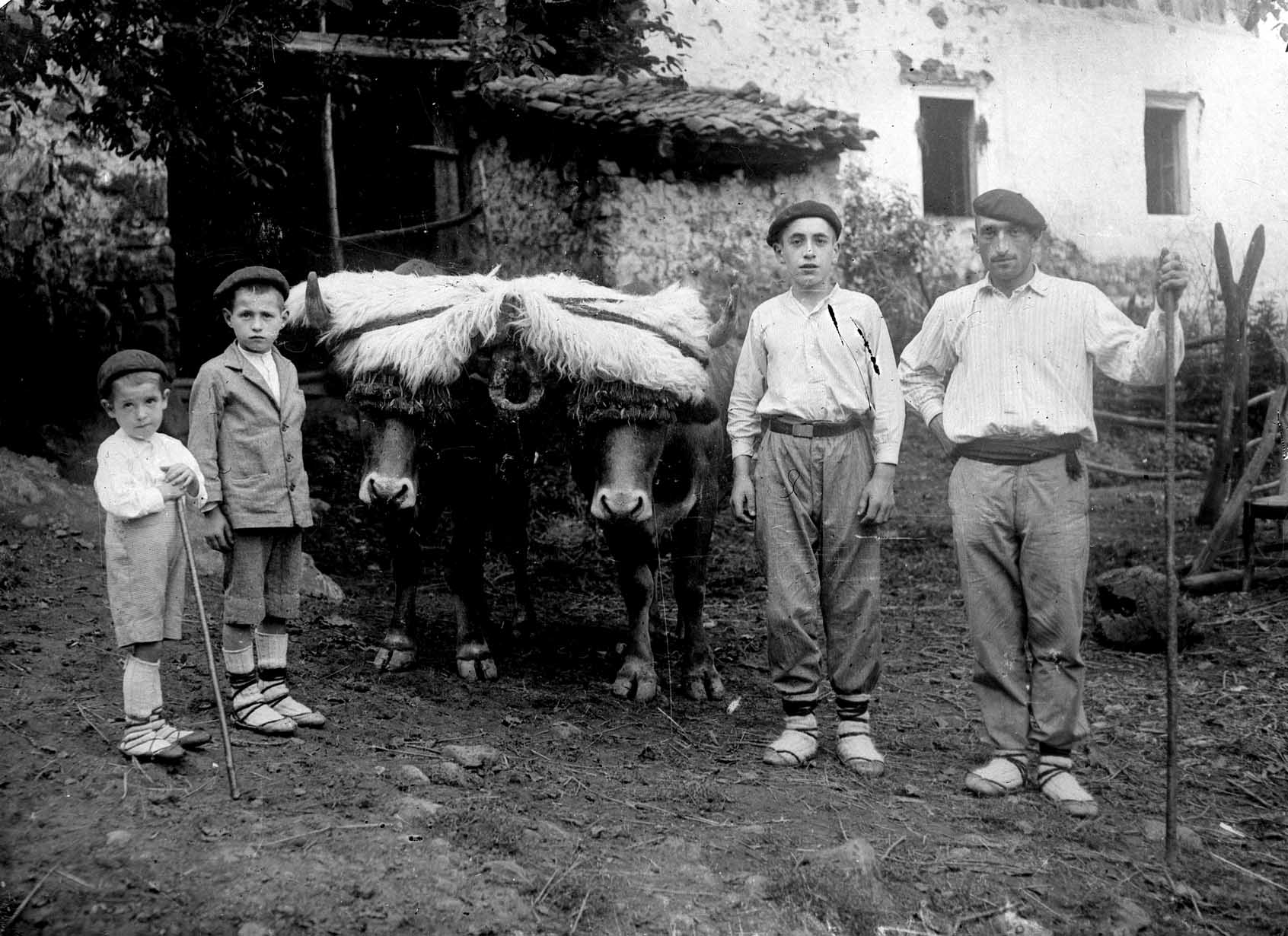
Farmers from the Basque Country

Rural history has been a major specialty of French scholars since the 1920s, thanks especially to the central role of the Annales School. Its journal Annales focuses attention on the synthesizing of historical patterns identified from social, economic, and cultural history, statistics, medical reports, family studies, and even psychoanalysis.

== Specialised journals ==
A number of academic journals exist with a specific focus on rural history. These include:

- Agricultural History (1927–). United States.
- Agricultural History Review. A Journal of Agricultural and Rural History (1953–). United Kingdom.
- Histoire & Sociétés Rurales (1990–). France.
- Rural History. Economy, Society, Culture (1990–). United Kingdom.

== See also ==
- Local history
- Rural American history
- Rural sociology
- Environmental history
- Landscape history
- One-place study

== Bibliography ==
- Bloch, Mark. French Rural History: An Essay on Its Basic Characteristics (1966) excerpt and text search
- Blum, Jerome. The End of the Old Order in Rural Europe (1978) 505pp
- Brenner, Robert. "Agrarian Class Structure and Economic Development in Pre-industrial Europe". Past and Present 70 (1976), pp. 30–74, influential statement of the controversial "Brenner thesis" that smallholding peasants had strong property rights and had little incentive to give up traditional technology or go beyond local markets, and thus no incentive toward capitalism
- Cipolla, C. M. Before the Industrial Revolution. European Society and Economy, 1000-1700 (2nd ed. 1976)
- Federico, Giovanni. Feeding the World: An Economic History of World Agriculture, 1800-2000. (2005). 388 pp. excerpt and text search
- Forster, R., and O. Ranum, eds. Rural Society in France. Selections from the Annales Economies, Sociétés, Civilisations (1977).
- Goody, Jack, Joan Thirsk, and E. P. Thompson, eds. Family and Inheritance: Rural Society in Western Europe, 1200-1800 (1976).
- Gras, Norman. A history of agriculture in Europe and America, (1925). online edition
- Herr, Richard, ed. Themes in Rural History of the Western World (1993) (Henry A Wallace Series on Agricultural History and Rural Studies) excerpt and text search
- Hoffmann, Richard C. Land, Liberties, and Lordship in a Late Medieval Countryside: Agrarian Structures and Change in the Duchy of Wroclaw (1989), Medieval Poland
- LeRoy Ladurie, E. The Peasants of Languedoc (1974), Medieval France
- Ludden, David. An Agrarian History of South Asia (1999)
- Vinje, Victor Condorcet. The Versatile Farmers of the North; The Struggle of Norwegian Yeomen for Economic Reforms and Political Power, 1750-1814 (2014) Nisus Publications.

=== British ===
- Butlin, R. A. The Transformation of Rural England, c. 1580-1800: A Study in Historical Geography (1982)
- Hanawalt, Barbara A. The Ties That Bound. Peasant Families in Medieval England (1986)
- Hilton, R. H. The English Peasantry in the Later Middle Ages (1975).
- Howkins, Alun. Reshaping Rural England 1850-1925 (1992)
- Howkins, Alun. The Death of Rural England: A Social History of the Countryside since 1900 (2003)
- Keith, William. The Rural Tradition: A Study of the Non-Fiction Prose Writers of the English Countryside (U Toronto Press, 1974)
- Kussmaul, Anne. Servants in Husbandry in Early Modern England (1981)
- Mingay, G. E., ed. The Victorian Countryside (2 vol 1981)
- Spufford, Margaret. Figures in the landscape : rural society in England, 1500-1700 (2000) online
- Taylor, Christopher. Village and Farmstead. A History of Rural Settlement in England (1983).
- Thirsk, Joan, editor. The Agrarian History of England and Wales (8 vol 1967-2011), a monumental scholarly history, from prehistory to 1939. online volumes
- Verdon, Nicola. "‘The modern countrywoman’: farm women, domesticity and social change in interwar Britain." History Workshop Journal 70#1 (2010). online

=== United States ===
- Cyclopedia of American agriculture; a popular survey of agricultural conditions, ed by L. H. Bailey, 4 vol 1907-1909. online edition highly useful compendium
- Barron, Hal S. Mixed Harvest: The Second Great Transformation in the Rural North, 1870-1930 (1997)
- Bowers, William L. The Country Life Movement in America, 1900-1920 (1974).
- Brunner, Edmund de Schweinitz. Rural social trends (1933) online edition
- Danbom, David B. Born in the Country: A History of Rural America (1995)
- Gjerde, Jon. The Minds of the West: Ethnocultural Evolution in the Rural Middle West, 1830-1917 (1997)
- Goreham, Gary A. Encyclopedia of Rural America (2 vol 1997); 438pp; 232 essays by experts on arts, business, community development, economics, education, environmental issues, family, labor, quality of life, recreation, and sports.
- Hurt, R. Douglas, ed. The Rural South Since World War II (1998)
- Kirby, Jack Temple. Rural Worlds Lost: The American South 1920-1960 (1987)
- Kulikoff, Allan. From British Peasants to Colonial American Farmers (2000)
- Lauck, Jon. "'The Silent Artillery of Time': Understanding Social Change in the Rural Midwest," Great Plains Quarterly 19 (Fall 1999)
- Schafer, Joseph. The social history of American agriculture (1936) online edition
- Weeden, William Babcock. Economic and Social History of New England, 1620-1789 (1891) 964 pages; online edition
- Wyman, Andrea. Rural women teachers in the United States (1997) online

=== Netherlands and Belgium ===
Curtis, Daniel R., "Trends in rural social and economic history of the pre-industrial Low Countries: recent themes and ideas in journals and books of the past five years (2007-2013)", review essay in BMGN: Low Countries Historical Review 128.3 (2013) 60-95.

=== Historiography ===
- Alfonso, Isabel, ed. The Rural History of Medieval European Societies. Trends and Perspectives, Turnhout: Brepols (The Medieval Countryside, 1), 2007.
- Atack, Jeremy. "A Nineteenth-century Resource for Agricultural History Research in the Twenty-first Century." Agricultural History 2004 78(4): 389-412. ISSN 0002-1482 Fulltext: in University of California Journals and Ebsco. On a large computerized database of individual American farmers from manuscript census.
- Barron, Hal S. "Rediscovering the Majority: The New Rural History of the Nineteenth-Century North," Historical Methods, Fall 1986, Vol. 19 Issue 4, pp 141–152
- Blanke, David. “Consumer Choice, Agency, and New Directions in Rural History,” Agricultural History 81#2 (Spring 2007), 182-203.
- Bogue, Allan G. "Tilling Agricultural History with Paul Wallace Gates and James C. Malin." Agricultural History 2006 80(4): 436-460. ISSN 0002-1482 Fulltext: in Ebsco
- Burchardt, Jeremy (2007). "Agricultural History, Rural History, or Countryside History?". Historical Journal. 50 (2): 465–481. doi:10.1017/S0018246X07006152. ISSN 0018-246X.
- Burton, Vernon O. "Reaping What We Sow: Community and Rural History," Agricultural History, Fall 2002, Vol. 76 Issue 4, pp 630–58 in JSTOR
- Dyer, C. "The Past, the Present and the Future in Medieval Rural History". Rural History: Economy, Society, Culture 1:1 (1990), pp. 37–49.
- Swierenga, Robert P. "Theoretical Perspectives on the New Rural History: From Environmentalism to Modernization,” Agricultural History 56#3 (July 1982): 495-502, focus on United States.

=== Primary sources ===
- Phillips, Ulrich B. ed. Plantation and Frontier Documents, 1649–1863; Illustrative of Industrial History in the Colonial and Antebellum South: Collected from MSS. and Other Rare Sources. 2 Volumes. (1909). online vol 1 and online vol 2
- Rasmussen, Wayne, ed. Agriculture in the United States: A Documentary History (4 large vol 1975) 2800 pages of primary sources.
- Schmidt, Louis Bernard, ed. Readings in the economic history of American agriculture (1925) online
- Sorokin, Pitirim, et al., eds. A Systematic Sourcebook in Rural Sociology (3 vol. 1930-1932), 2000 pages of primary sources and commentary; worldwide coverage; vol 1 online; also see vol 2 online; also see vol 3 online
