= Subodh Srivastava =

Indian costume designer

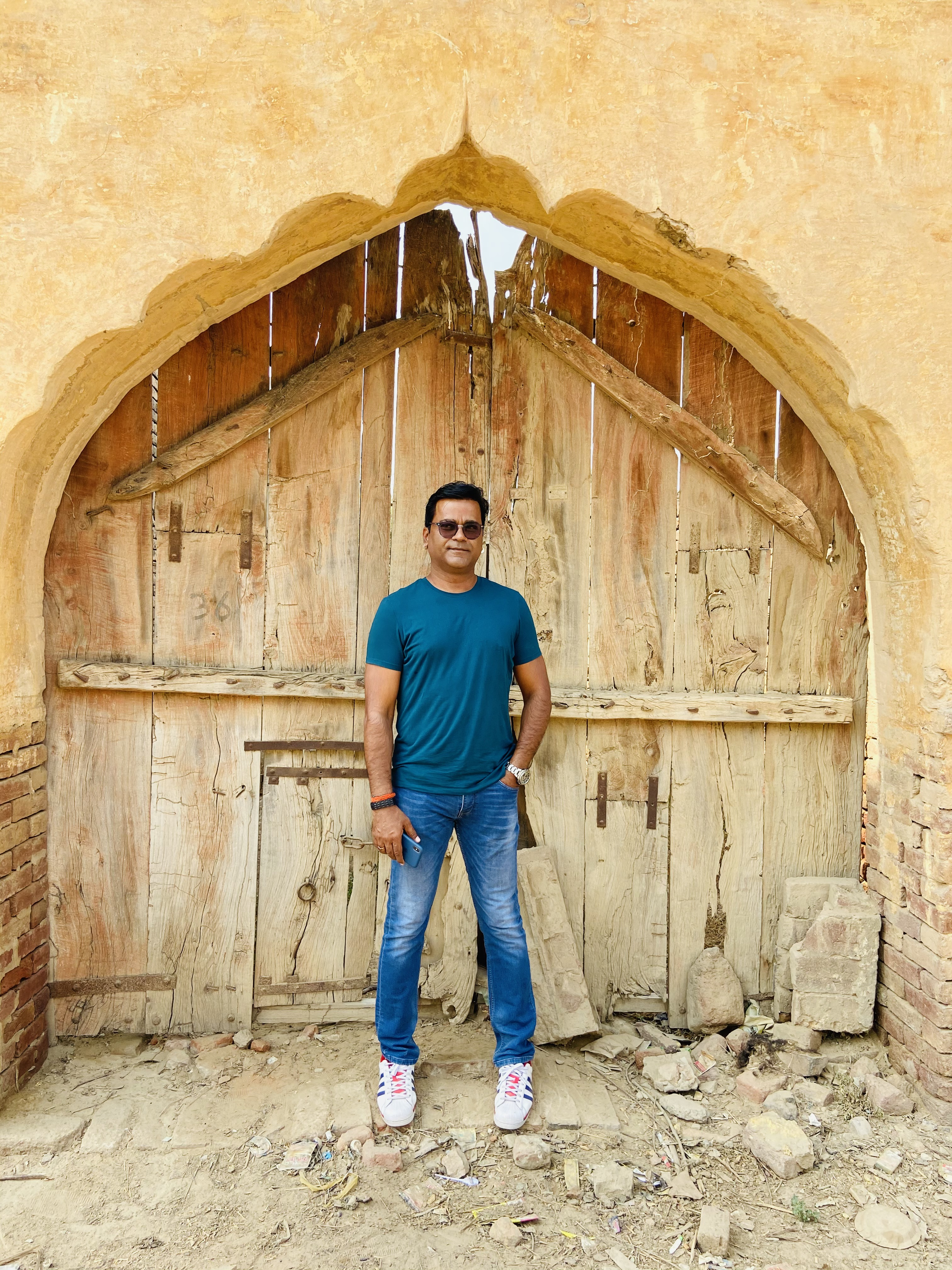
- Born: 16/10/1979; Varanasi, Uttar Pradesh
- Occupation: Fashion designer
- Years active: 2010 - present
- Awards: Screen Award (2013)

Subodh Srivastava is an Indian costume designer.

Subodh was praised for his work in Gangs of Wasseypur – Part 1 and Gangs of Wasseypur – Part 2, as he was the only designer for such a huge and ensemble cast. His work in Gangs of Wasseypur earned him his first nomination in Screen Awards in the category of Best Costume Designer.

== Filmography ==
- Semshook (2010
- No Problem (2010)
- Thank You (2011 film) (2011)
- Jaana Pehchana (2011)
- Chillar Party (2011)
- Gangs of Wasseypur – Part 1 (2012)
- Gangs of Wasseypur – Part 2 (2012)
- Saheb, Biwi Aur Gangster Returns (2013)
- Mastram (2014)
- Welcome Back (2014)
- Jazbaa (2015)
- Lahoriye (2017)
- Vodka Diaries (2017)
- Super 30 (2019)
- Marshal (2011)
- Rangbaaz (web series)(2019)
- Final Call (2019)
- Taanashah (2020)
- The Girl on the Train (film)(2021)
- Noise of Silence (2021)
- Bawri Chhori (2021)
- Dhindora (2021)
- Teeja Punjab (2021)
- Two Sister And A Husband (2022)
- Nazar Andaaz (2022)
- Inspector Avinash (2023)
- Blue Gold (2023)
- Joram (film) (2023)
- Luv Ki Arrange Marriage (2024)
- Match Fixing (film) (2024)
- Yeh Kaali Kaali Ankhein (2024)
- Roti Kapda aur Internet (2025)
- Inspector Avinash - season 2 (web series) (2025)
- Bhoochal (2025)
- Impression (2025)
- Dhara Ka Dhara Rah Gaya (2025)
- Bhabiji Ghar Par Hain - The Movie (2025)
