= Alun Howkins =

English social historian (1947–2018)

Alun Howkins (8 August 1947 – 12 July 2018) was an English social historian, specialising in the history of English rural society. Regarded as a leading historian of the English countryside and its working class, Howkins was a professor of history at the University of Sussex and co-founder of the journal Rural History.

== Early life ==
=== Background ===
Howkins was born in Bicester on 8 August 1947 into a working-class family; his father, a Communist Party supporter, was a mechanic but a head injury sustained in World War II led him to take up less skilled work as a store man later in life; Howkins' mother worked night-shifts in a hospital. After failing the eleven-plus examination, he attended Bicester Highfield Secondary Modern School; he later moved to a technical college in Banbury, but after he was expelled aged 15 he became an apprentice farm labourer.

=== Work, trade unionism and Ruskin College ===
Within a year and a half he had taken up a job at the ordnance depot in Bicester and in 1964 joined Pergamon Press as a copyeditor. Howkins had become involved with trade unionism while working as a farm labourer and at Pergamon he established a branch of the Clerical and Administrative Workers Union. He was introduced to the world of folk music at the same time, and through that the Communist Party. He was fired from his job at Pergamon in 1966 and worked for Blackwell's in Oxford for two years before enrolling at Ruskin College in Oxford, where he was taught by Raphael Samuel and became heavily involved in the History Workshop Movement.

== Academic career ==
Howkins spent two years at Ruskin College, before completing an undergraduate degree at the University of Oxford; history and English were his chosen subjects. In 1973, he moved to the University of Essex to begin doctoral studies; three years later, he started working at the University of Sussex, and only picked up his PhD studies again in the early 1980s, largely re-writing his thesis; the PhD was awarded by Essex in 1982 for "'The great momentous time': Radicalism and the Norfolk farm labourer 1872–1923". At Sussex, he became a professor of history and director of the School of Humanities' Graduate Centre before retiring in 2010 (whereupon he was appointed an emeritus professor).

Outside of university, Howkins was co-founder of the journal Rural History, was an inaugural editor of the History Workshop Journal, and wrote and presented the 1999 BBC television series Fruitful Earth, alongside the series Edwardian Farm and Mud, Sweat and Tractors: The Story of Agriculture. Howkins' interest in rural history reflected his political views. He supported trade union activism and the Labour Party. He was also a fond follower of folk music, performing in some of his lectures and classes, as well as outside university in several bands. In retirement, he moved to Norfolk. He died, aged 70, on 12 July 2018.

== Research ==
When he died, The Daily Telegraph called Howkins a "leading" historian of English rural society, especially farm labourers, the rural poor and rural folklore of the 19th and early 20th centuries. Influenced by History Workshop, Howkins' research emphasised the long history of class conflict in the countryside and he explored the emergence of a distinctive class culture among the rural working class. But he was also keen to demonstrate the changing nature of rural England, as it became a place of leisure in the 20th century, and as it was influenced by the mechanisation of agriculture and environmental concerns.

=== Books ===
- Poor Labouring Men: Rural Radicalism in Norfolk, 1872–1923 (Routledge & Kegan Paul, 1985).
- Reshaping Rural England: A Social History, 1850–1925 (HarperCollins, 1991).
- The Death of Rural England: A Social History of the Countryside since 1900 (Routledge, 2003).
