= David Ludden =

American historian

- Born: 15 March 1948 (age 78); United States
- Occupations: Author, Academic
- Known for: writing historical books

Academic work
- Discipline: History
- Website: dludden.com

David Ludden (born 15 March 1948) is an American historian, academic, author and university professor. He has served as the Professor Emeritus of History and South Asian Studies at the University of Pennsylvania and Professor of History at New York University.

== Life ==
He was born on 15 March 1948.

== Education ==
He started his studies at Yale University from 1966 to 1970.

Ludden got his PhD at the University of Pennsylvania in 1978 and became a faculty member there in 1981.

== Career ==
In 2008, he became a professor of history at New York University.

He has also served as a Visiting Professor of Development Research at BRAC University in Dhaka.

== Bibliography ==
He is the author of a number of notable books:

- Peasant history in South India
- India and South Asia : a short history
- An agrarian history of South Asia
