= Subodh Khandekar =

Indian field hockey player

Subodh Khandekar is a former international hockey player. He was born on 5 October 1964 in Jhansi, Uttar Pradesh, India and has represented India in various international tournaments. His father V B Khandekar also represented Services in National hockey; he is a product of the Uttar Pradesh Sports Hostel, Meerut. The first time he represented his state Uttar Pradesh was in the Jr. National hockey championship at Jabalpur.

He made his international debut in junior international hockey vs the Netherlands in Kenya tour 1983. He represented India in the Junior World Cup held at Vancouver in 1985. He has awarded best player in the Four Nations tournament held at Madrid in 1989. Khandekar had played 90 international hockey matches during the period between 1983 and 1993, scoring more than 50 goals. After retiring from international hockey he played in the Singapore hockey league and has coached national teams including the Joint Universities and Railways. His nephew Tushar Khandekar is also a current international hockey player.
