= Nathan Catucci =

American film director

- Born: Nathan Anthony Catucci; Rochester, New York, U.S.
- Citizenship: United States
- Education: New York University Tisch School of the Arts
- Occupation: Film director
- Notable work: Impossible Monsters
- Website: nathancatucci.com

Nathan Anthony Catucci is an American film director who is known for directing the award-winning feature film Impossible Monsters that was released in 2020.

Catucci's other projects in development are The Beltlands and Cabbage.

== Early life and education ==
Catucci was born in Rochester, New York. He holds a Bachelor of Fine Arts (BFA) in film and TV from New York University Tisch School of the Arts, where he graduated with honors in 2006.

== Career ==
Catucci wrote, directed and produced his debut feature film, Impossible Monsters. The movie starred Tony Award-winner Santino Fontana, Natalie Knepp, Devika Bhise, Donall O Healai, Chris Henry Coffey, Geoffrey Owens, Dennis Boutsikaris, and Laila Robins.

The film premiered at the 2019 Cinequest Film & Creativity Festival. The film subsequently screened at the New York Latino Film Festival presented by HBO, won Best Feature Narrative at the Arizona Underground Film Festival and received an honorable mention at the New Jersey Film Festival. The film had its UK premiere at Cine-Excess on November 7, 2019.

On February 14, 2020, the picture premiered in New York and Los Angeles theaters and Gravitas Ventures distributed it globally on March 3, 2020. For the production, Catucci received the Panavision New Filmmaker Grant.

== Filmography ==
Year	Title	Role
2006	So It Goes	Editor, director, producer, and writer
2008	Crusher	Writer and director
2011	I Want You	Director, editor, and cinematographer
2013	We Stole the Show: Brooklyn's Finest	Director, editor, and cinematographer
2019	Impossible Monsters	Editor, producer, writer, and director
Development	The Beltlands	Director, writer, and producer
Development	Cabbage	Director, writer, and producer

== Awards and recognition ==
- 2016: Panavision New Filmmaker Grant Recipient for Impossible Monsters
- 2019: Winner, Best Narrative Feature, Arizona Underground Film Festival for Impossible Monsters
- 2019: Honorable Mention, Best Feature Film, New Jersey International Film Festival for Impossible Monsters

== Personal life ==
Catucci currently lives in New York City on the Upper West Side of Manhattan with his wife, Meghan Catucci.
