= Auroshikha Dey =

Indian film actress

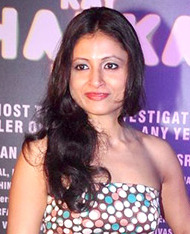
- Auroshikha Dey at the screening of Charlie Kay Chakkar Mein
- Born: Tezpur, Assam
- Occupations: Actress; Model
- Years active: 2011–present

Auroshikha Dey is an Indian actress who primarily works in Hindi cinema. She is best known for playing Jhalkari Bai in the British period drama The Warrior Queen of Jhansi (2019).

== Early life ==
Auroshikha Dey was born to a Bengali family in Tezpur, Assam, and settled in Bangalore. She moved to Bangalore during her high school years, as her father was in the army and therefore moved to many cities in India. She studied at Mount College, Bangalore, Karnataka. She learned Kathak at an early age and when in college, also took part in theatric plays. She then joined the Film and Television Institute of India, Pune.

== Career ==
During her time at the Film and Television Institute of India, Pune, Chandraprakash Dwivedi selected her for the TV series Upanishad Ganga. She played different characters in the 25-episode series. She then auditioned for Nagesh Kukunoor's Yeh Hausla. The film found no production houses for its release, has been lying in cans for years.

She appeared in the critically acclaimed drama Haat – The Weekly Bazaar (2011) directed by Seema Kapoor, along with Divya Dutta and Meenal Kapoor, which has been screened at several film festivals in India and abroad. Her independent film, Handover (2011), was screened at film festivals but didn't get a theatrical release. The film was streamed on the MX Player OTT, nine years later. Her first theatrically released film was Myoho (2012). She then appeared in Charlie Kay Chakkar Mein (2015) and NH-8: Road to Nidhivan (2015).

Her most significant role came in 2019 with the release of The Warrior Queen of Jhansi, directed by Swati Bhise. She played the role of Jhalkari Bai, with Devika Bhise, who played the titular role, receiving mixed reviews. The film was screened at the British Film Festival and won the Impact Award at the Vancouver International Women in Film Festival 2019. The film was also a recipient of the ReFrame stamp for gender parity. She learned Sword fighting, archery, and horse riding to portray her role.

She starred in Pragya Kapoor's Maali – the gardener (2022), which was screened at the Chicago South Asian Film Festival 2022. She appeared in Lomad (2023), touted to be the world's first one shot black and white feature film, winning accolades across the globe at various film festivals. She will be next seen in Gajendra Ahire's Hindi Marathi bilingual Bidi Bakda (2023), and Konstantin Bojanov's The Shameless (2023).

== Filmography ==
| Year | Title | Role | Language | Notes | Ref |
|---|---|---|---|---|---|
| 2010 | De Nova – The Road Less Trodden | Zainab | Malayalam | | |
| 2011 | Haat – The Weekly Bazaar | Ambalika | Hindi, Rajasthani | | |
| 2011 | Handover | | Hindi, Magahi | | |
| 2012-2013 | Upanishad Ganga | | Hindi | TV series | |
| 2012 | Myoho | Nandita | Hindi | | |
| 2012 | Prem Mayee | Megha | Hindi | | |
| 2014 | Myth of Kleopatra | | Hindi, English | | |
| 2014 | Points of Origin | Anjali | English | Short | |
| 2014 | Salaam : An ode to friendship | The girl | Hindi | | |
| 2015 | Charlie Kay Chakkar Mein | Sameera | Hindi | | |
| 2015 | NH-8: Road to Nidhivan | Radha | Hindi | | |
| 2016 | Darr Sabko Lagta Hai | | Hindi | TV series | |
| 2018-2019 | Damaged | Pallavi | Hindi | Web series | |
| 2019 | The Warrior Queen of Jhansi | Jhalkari Bai | English | | |
| 2019 | Trial Of Satyam Kaushik | Sara Rizvi | Hindi | TV movie | |
| 2019 | Surajya Sanhita | Draupadi | Hindi | TV series | |
| 2020 | Flesh | Manda | Hindi | Web series | |
| 2022 | Maali – the gardener | | Hindi | | |
| 2023 | Chatrapathi | | Hindi | | |
| 2023 | Lomad | | Hindi | | |
| TBA | Bidi Bakda | | Hindi, Marathi | | |
| TBA | Rongpencil – The colour of Innocence | | Bengali | | |
| TBA | The Shameless | | English | | |
