= Naomi Ekperigin =

American comedian

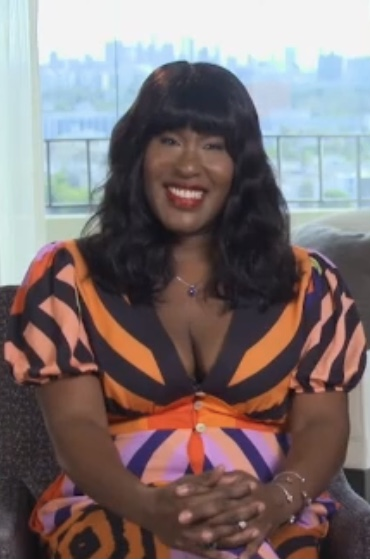
- Ekperigin in 2022
- Born: Harlem, New York, U.S.
- Education: Wesleyan University
- Occupations: Comedian, actress, writer
- Years active: 2010–present
- Spouse: Andy Beckerman

Naomi Ekperigin is an American stand-up comedian, podcaster, actress, writer, and producer. She wrote for the Comedy Central sitcom Broad City from 2015–2016, the NBC sitcom Great News from 2017–2018, and the Apple TV+ series Mythic Quest from 2020–2025 and Peacock's St. Denis Medical. She has had guest spots voicing roles in the animated series Bob's Burgers, Family Guy, American Dad, Tuca & Bertie, and Central Park. Ekperigin co-hosts the Couples Therapy podcast with her husband, Andy Beckerman.

== Early life and education ==
Ekperigin was born and raised in Harlem, with a father from Nigeria and a mother from Detroit. She attended the Dalton School and graduated from Wesleyan University in 2005. In college, Ekperigin began performing comedy and doing improv.

== Career ==
After graduating from college, Ekperigin spent a year touring with the National Theatre for the Deaf, and she returned to New York in 2007 where she got a start doing stand-up while working a day job at an art magazine. When that magazine folded in 2013, Ekperigin found a position working as a writer's assistant for Broad City. She was promoted to staff writer in the show's second season and served as a writer on season 3 as well.

In 2015, Ekperigin was a nominee, with the Broad City writing staff, for the Writers Guild of America Award for Television: Comedy Series. Splitsider praised her work as "savvy, smart, funny and politically active" and Essence named her to its list of "8 Black Comediennes Who are 'Ready' for SNL."

In May 2016, Comedy Central announced that Ekperigin would create a half-hour special for the network, taped in New Orleans in June 2016. September 29, 2016, she made her late-night debut on Late Night with Seth Meyers. Her half-hour special premiered on Comedy Central just two weeks later, October 14 at midnight. Ekperigin also co-wrote a television pilot for Comedy Central with former Daily Show correspondent Jessica Williams. Ekperigin has also written for Difficult People and written for and appeared on Totally Biased with W. Kamau Bell.

She was a regular performer on the WNYC podcast 2 Dope Queens. Other projects include a pilot for TruTV called Inside Caucasia, developed with Ekperigin's partner, comedian Andy Beckerman.

In June 2017, she joined the writing staff of the NBC sitcom Great News, starring Briga Heelan, Andrea Martin, and John Michael Higgins. She then went on to write for season 2 of the CBS All Access show No Activity and the HBO limited series Mrs. Fletcher, starring Kathryn Hahn.

She has a recurring role in the Apple TV+ show Mythic Quest as Carol, the beleaguered HR person at a video game company. She was promoted to a main role in season 3.

Ekperigin is a writer and co-executive producer on St. Denis Medical, which premiered on Peacock in 2024. It has been renewed for a second season.

== Filmography ==
=== Film ===
| Year | Title | Role | Notes | Ref. |
|---|---|---|---|---|
| 2019 | Blush | Irritated Angel Committee Member | | |
| 2021 | Yes Day | Miss Hoffling | | |
| 2022 | Me Time | Jill | | |
| 2023 | Family Switch | Naomi | | |

=== Television ===
| Year | Title | Role | Notes | Ref. |
|---|---|---|---|---|
| 2011 | The Denial Show | —N/a | Writer; 2 episodes | |
| 2013–2014 | Above Average Presents | Mom #1 / Dragon | 3 episodes | |
| 2015 | Adam Ruins Everything | Shaina | Episode: "Adam Ruins Work" | |
| 2015–2016 | Broad City | —N/a | Staff writer; 20 episodes | |
| 2017–2018 | Great News | —N/a | Story editor; 13 episodes | |
| 2018 | Alone Together | Samantha | Episode: "Nurse Esther" | |
| 2018–2019 | Single Parents | Miss Adams | 3 episodes | |
| 2019 | Bob's Burgers | Maya | Voice; Episode: "Land of the Loft" | |
| 2019 | Mrs. Fletcher | —N/a | Co-producer; 7 episodes | |
| 2020 | Corporate | Devin | Episode: "Fuck You Money" | |
| 2020–2022 | Family Guy | Therapist / Hoda Kotb | Voice; 2 episodes | |
| 2020–2025 | Mythic Quest | Carol | 21 episodes / Writer (1 episode) also supervising producer (10 episodes) | |
| 2021 | Cinema Toast | Sophia | Voice; Episode: "Warehouse Friends" | |
| 2021 | Tuca & Bertie | Performer | Voice; Episode: "Bird Mechanics" | |
| 2021–2022 | Central Park | Jogger #3 / Salesperson / Jan | Voice; 8 episodes | |
| 2022 | Search Party | Dr. Pigeon | Episode: "Song of Songs" | |
| 2022 | The Glue Factory | Whoopi Trotberg / Lady Showdiva | Voice; 2 episodes | |
| 2023 | Strange Planet | Straight Forward Ref. / Being #1 | Voice; Episode: "Family, Fandom, Footorb" | |
| 2023 | American Dad | Orderly | Voice; Episode: "Productive Panic" | |
| 2024 | Hacks | Naomi Ekperigin | Episode: "The Roast of Debra Vance" | |
| 2025 | St. Denis Medical | —N/a | Writer; 3 episodes | |
