= Devika Bhise =

American actress (born 1991)

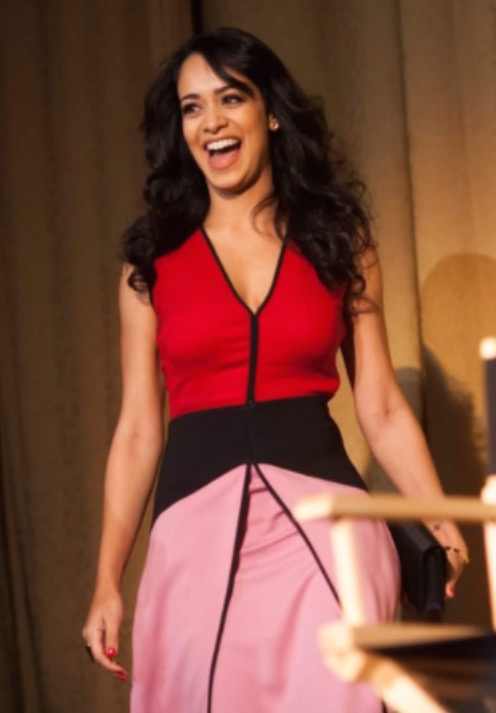
- Devika Bhise at SFFF 2016
- Born: Manhattan, New York, US
- Education: Johns Hopkins University; The Brearley School
- Occupation: Actress
- Spouse: Nicholas Gilson (m. 2020)
- Children: 2
- Mother: Swati Bhise

Devika Bhise is an American actress, best known for her performance in The Man Who Knew Infinity, and for her role as Antoinette Benneteau in The Rookie: Feds.

== Early life ==
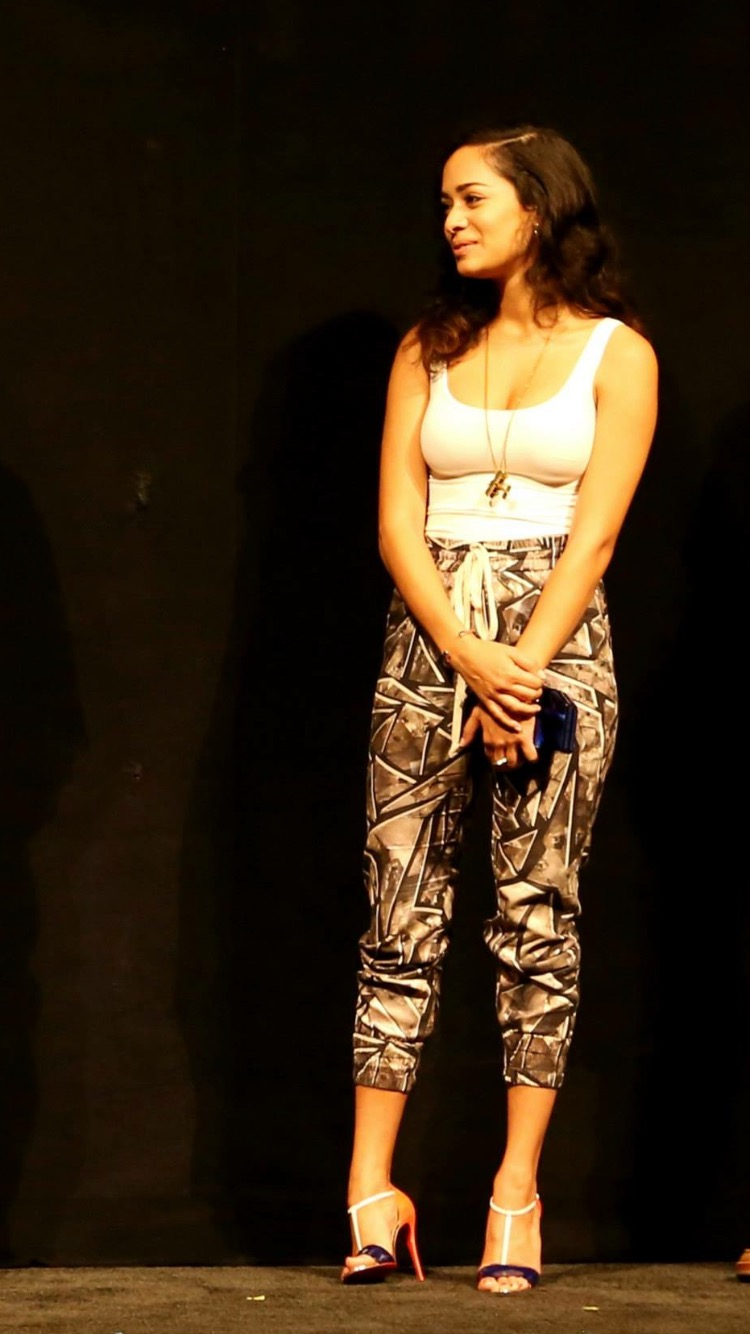
Devika Bhise at a Q&A at TIFF in 2015

Bhise was born and raised in Manhattan's Upper East Side in New York City, and is of Marathi descent. She attended The Brearley School, an all-girl private school in Manhattan, and Johns Hopkins University, where she won the Hodson Trust Scholarship and was a Woodrow Wilson Fellow under the mentorship of John Astin. While at Johns Hopkins University, she acted in Ira Hauptman's play, The Partition, based on the life of Ramanujan, which contributed to her being cast in the film years later.

== Career ==
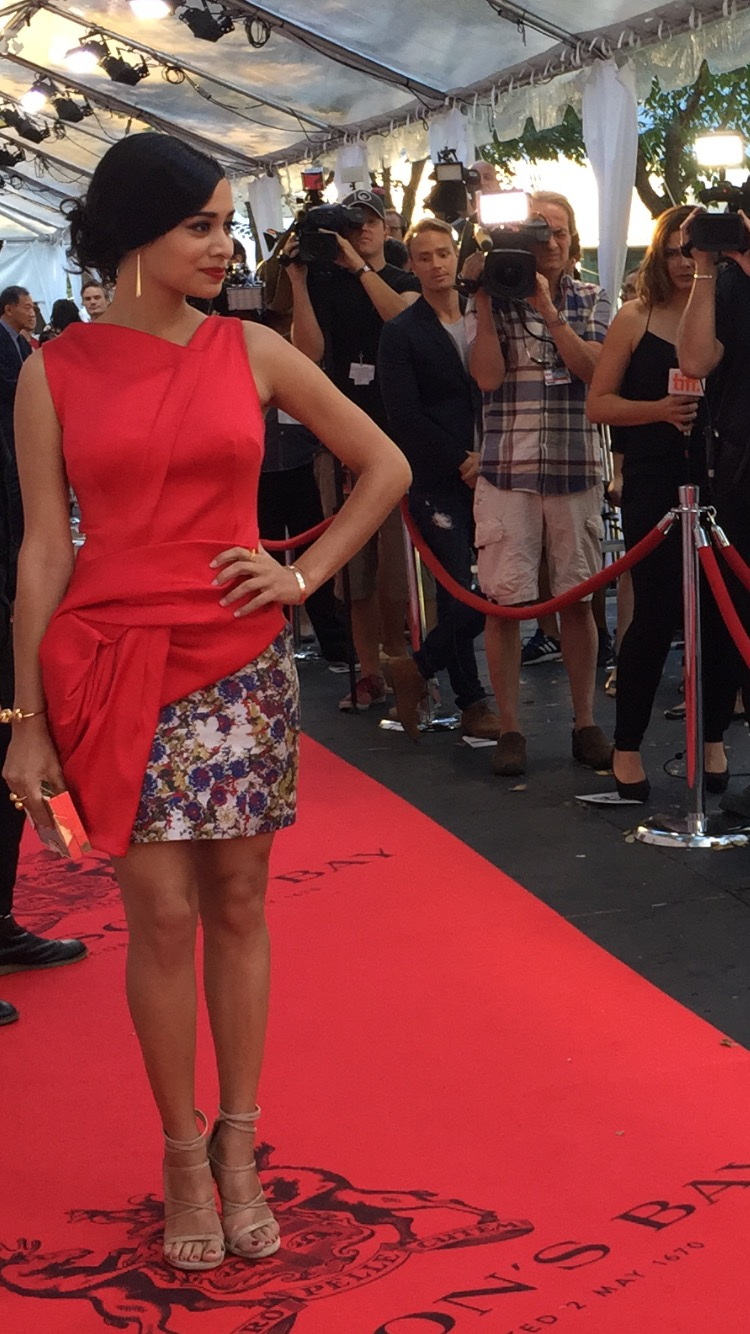
Devika Bhise at the global premiere of The Man Who Knew Infinity at Roy Thompson Hall at TIFF

Bhise was cast in her first film, The Accidental Husband, directed by Griffin Dunne, in tenth grade. While in high school, she also directed a documentary film Hijras: The Third Gender, which won the award for Best Social Documentary at the New York Independent Film Festival in 2009. After graduating from Johns Hopkins, Bhise appeared in multiple plays Off-Broadway, including Partial Comfort's production of And Miles To Go, a play written by Chad Beckim and directed by Hal Brooks. She starred in television series such as Elementary and One Bad Choice until she was cast in The Man Who Knew Infinity with Dev Patel and Jeremy Irons. She also performed in 'Impossible Monsters' which also starred Chris Henry Coffey and Geofrey Owens in 2020 as a university student being part of a study on sleep paralysis. She was seen next as the lead role in The Warrior Queen of Jhansi, the biopic on Indian queen Rani Lakshmibai, acting opposite Derek Jacobi and Rupert Everett. Bhise also co-wrote the script. Bhise has guest starred in many television shows, including Chicago Med on NBC, Extrapolations on Apple TV+, Fantasy Island (2021 TV series) on Fox Broadcasting Company, and 11 episodes of The Rookie: Feds on ABC, playing Antoinette Benneteau, a French laboratory technician for the FBI and love interest of Brendon Acres, played by Kevin Zegers.

== Social activism ==
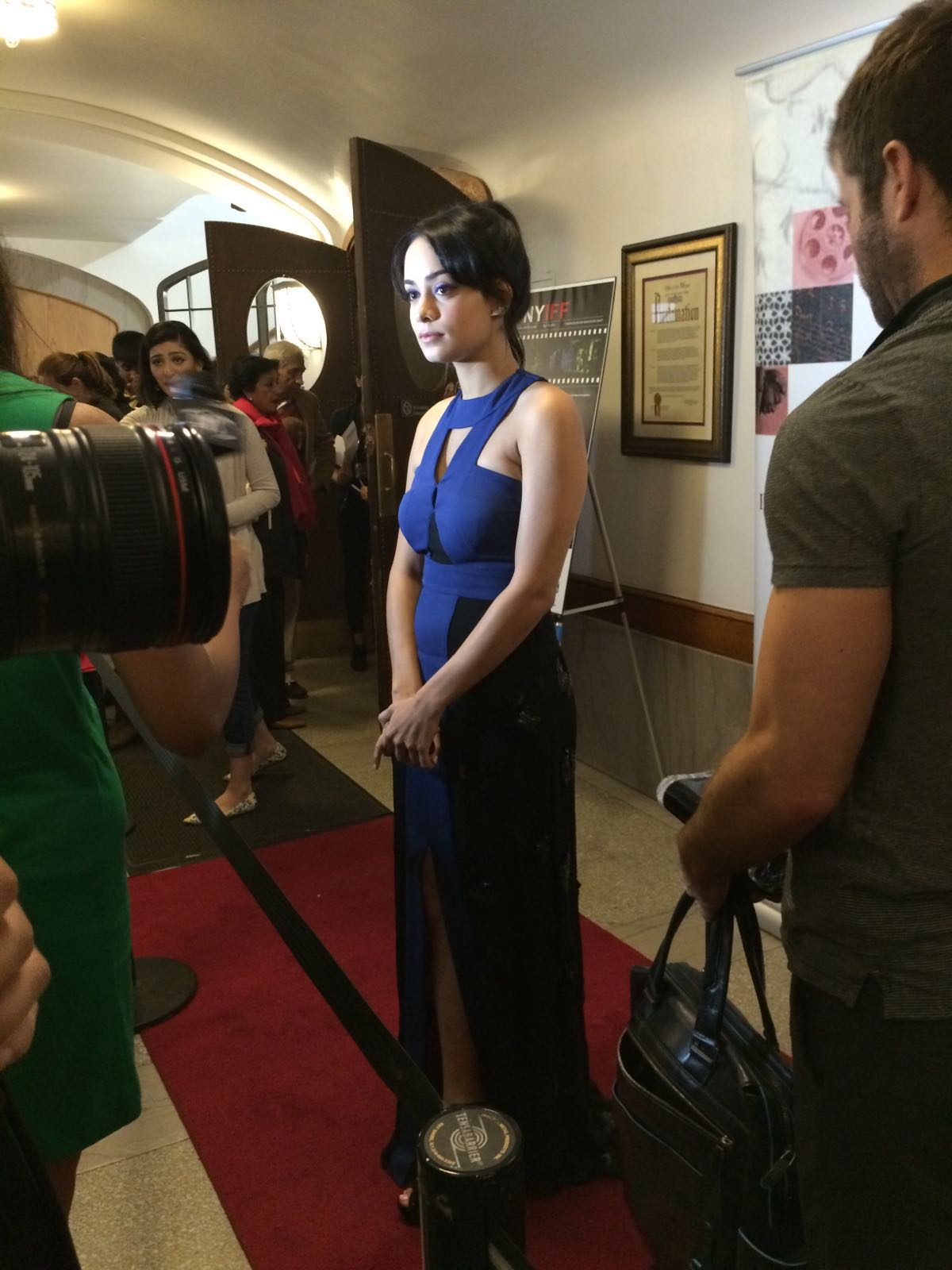
Devika Bhise at the Indo-American Film Festival in 2016

Bhise is part of New York's New Abolitionists, a group of New Yorkers "united by our commitment to ending human trafficking, in New York State and globally", alongside Christie Brinkley, Michael Bloomberg, Tina Fey, Seth Meyers, Lee Daniels, Preet Bharara, Diane von Furstenberg, Gloria Steinem, Meryl Streep, and others. She has also been honored by Asia Society as a leader in "socio-cultural developments that have long-term impact on the presentation and response to Asian-American culture" and has been an ongoing contributor to The Asia Foundation.

She serves on the board of directors of Sing For Hope alongside Jon Batiste, Andrea Bocelli, Eva Haller, Muhammad Yunus, and others.

== Personal life ==
She is the daughter of dancer and director Swati Bhise. In 2020, Bhise married Nicholas Gilson, Founder and CEO of Gilson Snow.

== Filmography ==
=== Film ===
Year	Film	Role	Notes
2008	The Accidental Husband	Chandini	
2013	Queensbee	Ganesha Girl	Short film
2015	The Bench	Erica	Short film
2015	The Man Who Knew Infinity	Janaki	
2017	Impossible Monsters	Jo	
2017	Mosaic	Clarice	
2018	The Rest of Us	Reina	
2019	The Warrior Queen of Jhansi	Rani Lakshmibai	

=== Television ===
Year	Title	Role	Notes
2015	One Bad Choice	Stephanie	Episode: "Michelle Gopaul"
2015	Elementary	Minerva	2 episodes: "Hemlock" and "The Past is Parent"
2022	Chicago Med	Varsha Patel	Episode: "May Your Choices Reflect Hope, Not Fear"
2022–2023	The Rookie: Feds	Antoinette Benneteau	Recurring role
2023	Extrapolations	Lola	Episode: "Lola"
2023	Fantasy Island	Natalie Rose	Episode: "War of the Roses (and the Hutchinsons)"
2024	The Rookie	Antoinette Benneteau	Recurring role (season 7)
2025	The Recruit	Juno Marsh	Recurring role (season 2)
