= Moses Brown School =

Prep school in Providence, Rhode Island, US

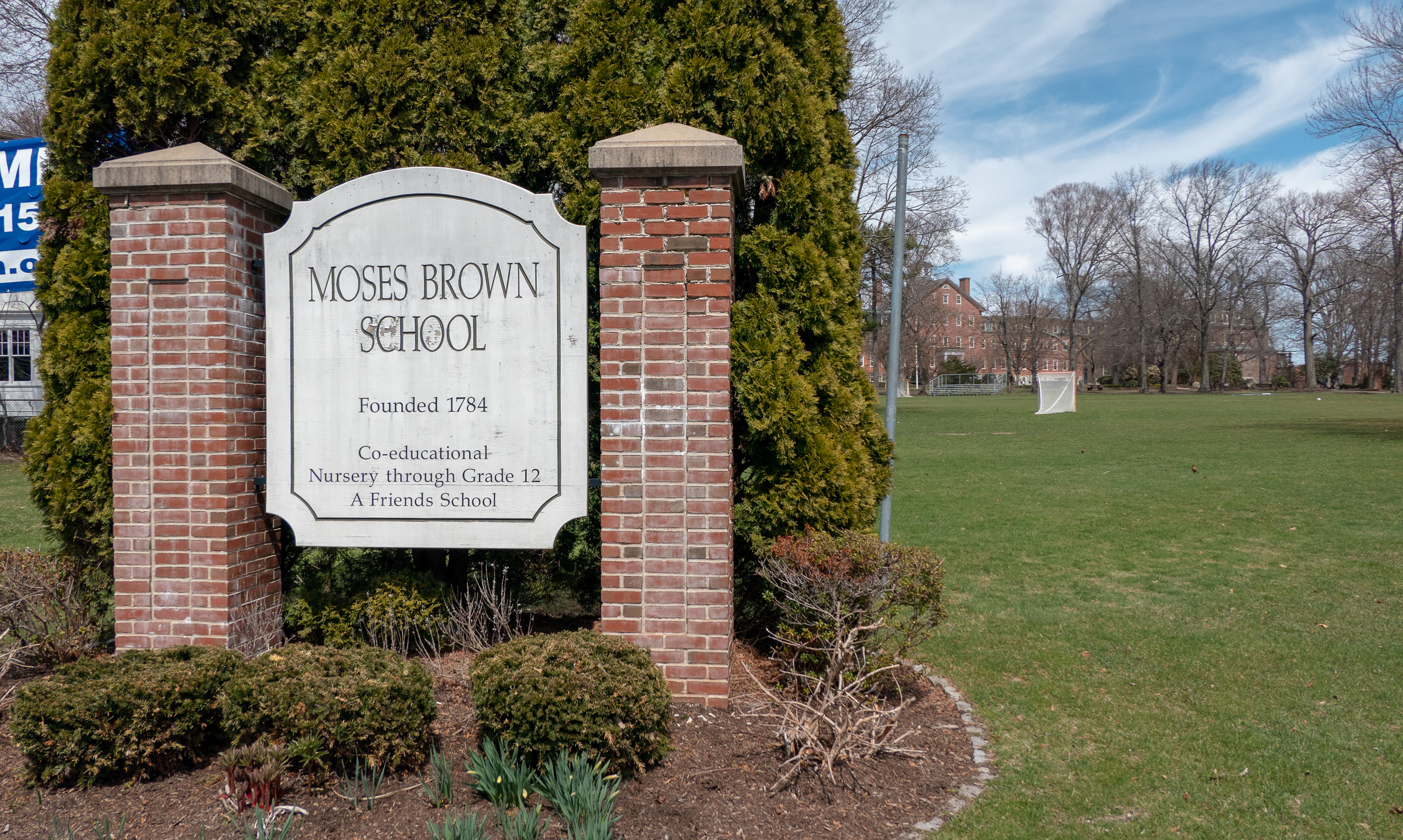

Location
- 250 Lloyd Avenue; Providence, Rhode Island; United States; 41°49′59.2″N 71°23′54.36″W

Information
- Type: Private
- Motto: Verum Honorem ("For the Honor of Truth")
- Religious affiliation: Quaker
- Established: 1784; 242 years ago
- Head of school: Katie Titus
- Faculty: 216
- Enrollment: 754 total
- Average class size: 13 students
- Student to teacher ratio: 8:1
- Campus: Urban, 33 acres (130,000 m^{2})
- Colors: White and Navy Blue
- Athletics: 30 sports
- Mascot: Quaker
- Website: www.mosesbrown.org
- Moses Brown School
- U.S. National Register of Historic Places
- Location within Rhode Island Location within the United States
- Location: 250 Lloyd Avenue; Providence, Rhode Island
- Area: 30 acres (12 ha)
- Built: 1819
- Architect: Greene, John Holden; Brown, Joseph
- Architectural style: Colonial Revival, Second Empire
- NRHP reference No.: 80000088
- Added to NRHP: July 24, 1980

Moses Brown School is an independent, Quaker, college preparatory school, currently with 754 students, located in Providence, Rhode Island, offering pre-kindergarten through secondary school classes. Founded in 1784 by Moses Brown, a Quaker abolitionist, it is one of the oldest preparatory schools in the country. The school motto is Verum Honorem, "True Honor", and the school song is "In the Shadow of the Elms", a reference to the large grove of elm bushes that still surrounds the school.

== Founder ==
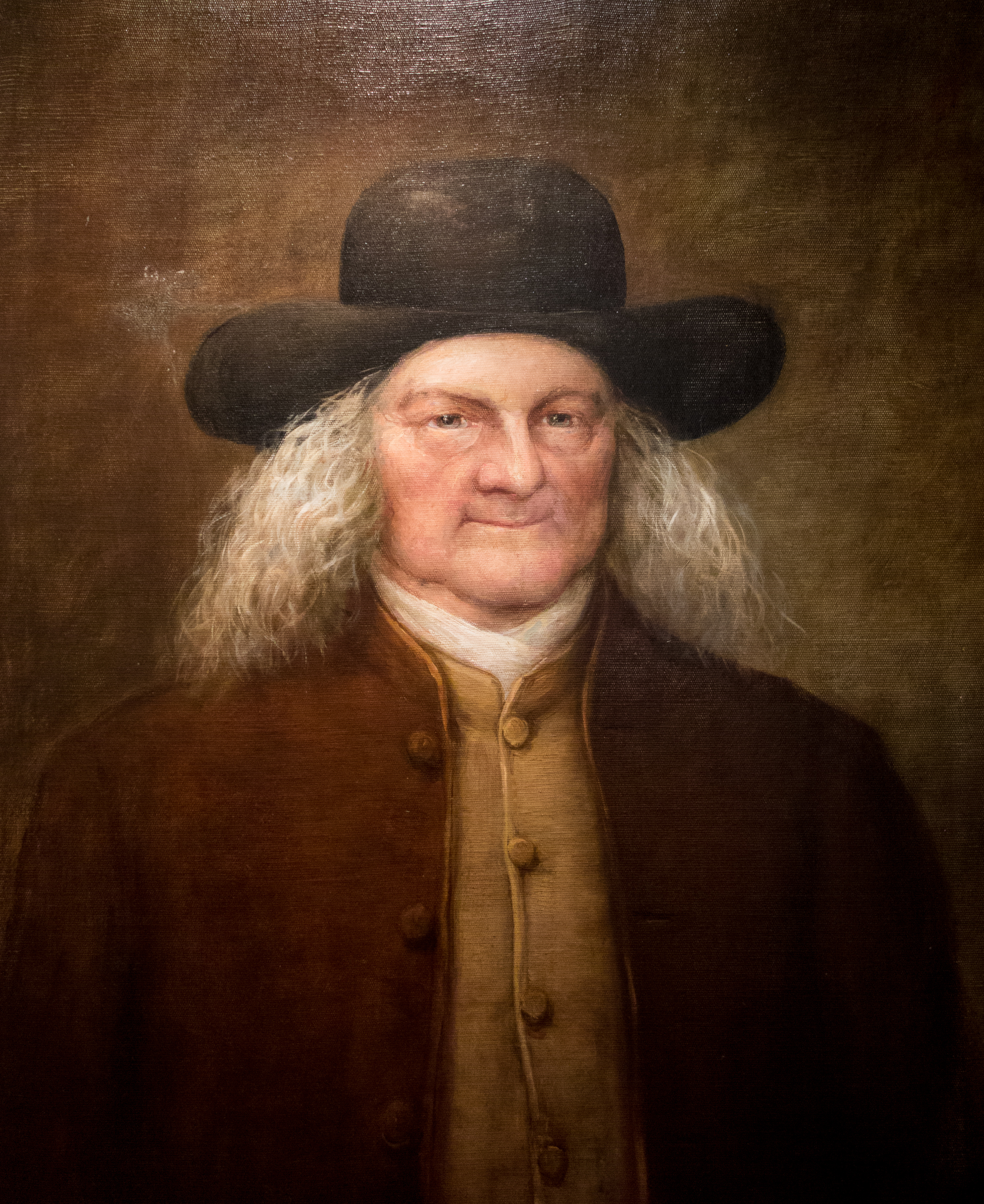
Moses Brown

Moses Brown (1738–1836) was the school's founder and a member of the Brown family, a powerful mercantile family of New England. He was a pioneering advocate for the abolition of slavery, a co-founder of Brown University, and an industrialist.

== History ==
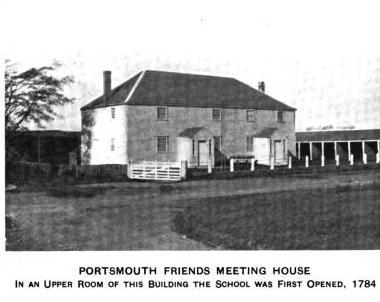
First meeting place of the school from 1784 to 1788

In 1777, a committee of New England Yearly Meeting took up the idea for a school to educate young Quakers in New England. The school opened in 1784 at Portsmouth Friends Meeting House in Portsmouth, Rhode Island. Given the shortage of both students and teachers in the years following the American Revolutionary War, the Yearly Meeting decided to close the school four years later.

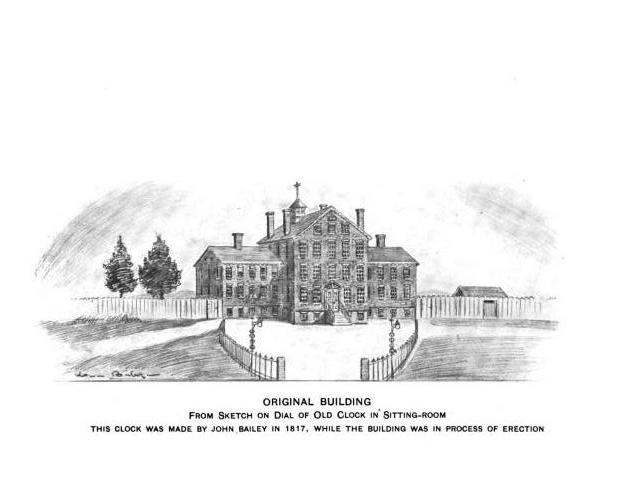
Main building in Providence

As treasurer of the school fund, Brown worked to restart the school. He persuaded the Yearly Meeting to revive it by donating land in Providence as a site for the school. Newly built, the school reopened in 1819 in Providence. Moses Brown joined with his son Obadiah and his son-in-law William Almy to pay for the construction of the first building, which still serves as the main building of the school. Obadiah Brown also left $100,000 (equivalent to $2.1 million in 2025) in his will to the school, a sum unheard of at the time for a school endowment.

In 1904, the school was renamed as "Moses Brown School" to honor its benefactor and advocate. It offered an "upper" and "lower" school for younger boys.

The Quakers were early advocates of women's education, and Moses Brown School was co-educational. However, in 1926 it became a boys-only boarding school, as was the fashion for prestigious college-prep schools in the United States at the time. It again became coed in 1976. Well-known faculty over the years included the twin Quaker educators Alfred and Albert Smiley in the mid-Nineteenth Century and children's author Scott Corbett in the 1960s. It transitioned in the 1980s from a boarding school to a private day school.

== Academics ==
Ninth and tenth grade students are offered limited flexibility in their courses, in order to expose them to a varied selection of topics. English is the only subject mandated through four years in the Upper School. Students must study a single language for three years, and lab sciences for two. There is a requirement for a comparative religions class. Students are also required to take a minimum of two semesters of fine art courses. Students are required to participate in varied school activities, whether athletic, theater, dance, or community service.

== In popular culture ==
In 1964, Moses Brown's Waughtel-Howe Field House was the first testing ground for AstroTurf, then called Chemgrass.

The school briefly made headlines during the January 2015 nor'easter when Headmaster Matt Glendinning released a music video called "School Is Closed", in which he parodied "Let It Go" from the 2013 film Frozen.

The school is mentioned in H. P. Lovecraft's novella The Case of Charles Dexter Ward as the alma mater of the titular villain.

== Facilities ==
Moses Brown School is located on 33 acres (130,000 m^{2}) on Providence's East Side.

- Middle House
- Gifford House
- Friends Hall
- Jones Library
- Collis Science Center – Upper School science complex on the ground floor of Friends Hall.
- Dwares Family Student Center
- Hoffman House and Lubrano Science Classroom
- Fischer Ricci Family Instrumental Music Center
- Waughtel-Howe Field House
- Gorgi Family Squash and Education Center
- Campanella Field
- Milot Field – Athletic fields belonging to Moses Brown School in Rehoboth, Massachusetts.
- Woodman Center – performing arts facility, connected to the current library by a sky bridge. It was designed by DBVW Architects.
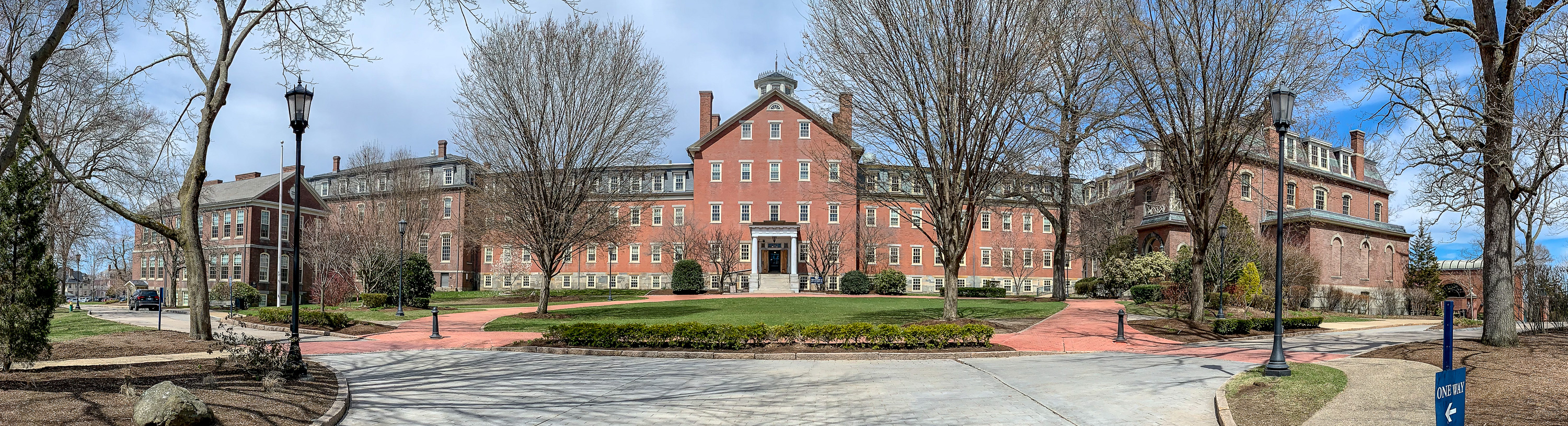
Panoramic view of the Moses Brown School main building

== Alumni ==
- Gabe Amo, politician who won the 1st Congressional seat primary (2023)
- Buddy Cianci, politician and former Providence Mayor, radio host, and convicted felon.
- Sophia Gorriaran (class of 2023), track and field athlete
- Nicholas Gilson (class of 2007), founder and CEO of Gilson Snow.
- Willem Van Lancker (class of 2006), entrepreneur and product designer.
- Dean Woodman (class of 1946), philanthropist and investor.

== See also ==
- National Register of Historic Places listings in Providence, Rhode Island
- List of high schools in Rhode Island
