= A Merry Little Ex-Mas =

2025 film by Steve Carr

- Release poster
- Directed by: Steve Carr
- Written by: Holly Hester
- Produced by: Paula Hart; Melissa Joan Hart
- Starring: Alicia Silverstone; Oliver Hudson; Jameela Jamil; Pierson Fodé; Linda Kash; Melissa Joan Hart
- Cinematography: Adam Santelli
- Edited by: Craig Herring
- Music by: Jeff Cardoni
- Production company: Hartbreak Films
- Distributed by: Netflix
- Release date: November 12, 2025
- Running time: 91 minutes
- Country: United States
- Language: English

A Merry Little Ex-Mas is a 2025 American Christmas romantic comedy film directed by Steve Carr and written by Holly Hester. It stars Alicia Silverstone, Oliver Hudson, Jameela Jamil and Pierson Fodé. It was released on Netflix on November 12, 2025.

== Plot ==
After falling in love, Kate abandoned her career ambitions to move to Everett's small home town (Winterlight), where he became a doctor. Over the years, the two grew apart as they resented each other's faults- Kate's commitment to environmentalism and Everett's dedication to his job. Now that the kids are older, Kate and Everett decide to get divorced, but agree to celebrate one last Christmas in their home with their kids, Sienna and Gabriel.

Sienna comes home from college for the holiday, bringing her Harry Potter-obsessed boyfriend Nigel. During dinner, Nigel accidentally reveals to Kate that Everett is dating a new woman, which everyone else knows about. When she confronts Everett about the news, he admits he could not find the words to tell her. He then introduces his new girlfriend Tess to the family, and suggests dinner at his place.

Kate struggles with Gabriel's reluctance to go to college and Sienna's decision to date someone with no career ambitions. The added stress of Tess makes Kate act out; she attempts to establish new traditions with her children by taking them Christmas tree shopping without Everett. The children are not interested, but while selecting a tree Kate meets Chet, a much younger man.

Everett and Tess take the kids sledding, so Kate brings Chet to crash the party. While sledding together, Kate hurts herself, and shares an intimate moment with Everett as he examines her injuries. After, Tess confronts Kate about her relationship with Everett and asks her how she let him get away; Kate explains her grievances about Everett's commitment to his work, which led him to neglect their family. Chet poses same question to Everett, who replies that Kate cared more about her environmental concerns than their marriage. Tess and Chet both agree that someone else's loss is their gain.

A few days before Christmas, the family meets for their annual gingerbread making contest. Everett apologizes to Kate for spending too much time at work. He explains that being the son of gay dads made him feel he had something to prove, turning him into a workaholic. Initially moved, Kate is upset when Everett then says he will take what he learned from Kate to his next marriage and potential new kids. Irate, Kate snaps in front of everyone and reveals that she plans to sell the house and move to Boston, upsetting everyone.

On Christmas Eve, Kate gifts Everett a new indoor grill, and he surprises her with her favorite perfume that he handmade from scratch. Tess is visibly upset by the difference between Everett's gift to her and Everett's gift to his ex-wife. Everyone decides to leave to avoid the awkwardness.

A fire suddenly breaks out, so Chet strips and attempts to put out the fire with his clothes. Gabriel saves the day when he locates a fire extinguisher and puts out the fire. Tess sees the whole event as a red flag and storms out. Kate thanks Chet for his kindness but ultimately rejects him.

That night, Kate and her kids are cuddling on the couch together when Everett arrives. He reveals that he closed the clinic for the night so he could be with them all on Christmas Eve. Together, the four of them read the family scrapbook as Everett and Kate's feet touch.

Overnight, a snowstorm wipes out the power in Winterlight; Kate and the kids do not notice because she has set up her house to run on solar energy. At Everett's, Tess departs with her suitcase and is picked up by Chet. Realizing Kate's house is the only one with light and heat, the family brings everyone from town there to celebrate the holiday. During the celebration, Kate makes amends with her children and accepts them.

Later that night, Kate finds Everett outside on the balcony. There, Everett declares that he does not want to get divorced and is willing to quit being a doctor to be with her. Kate admits she does not want to move to Boston. They throw away the divorce papers and kiss.

A year later, the whole family comes together to celebrate yet another Christmas.

== Cast ==
- Alicia Silverstone as Kate Holden
- Oliver Hudson as Dr. Everett Holden
- Jameela Jamil as Tess Wiley
- Pierson Fodé as Chet Moore
- Linda Kash as Doris
- Melissa Joan Hart as April
- Geoffrey Owens as Daryl
- Wilder Hudson as Gabriel Holden
- Emily Hall as Sienna Holden
- Timothy Innes as Nigel
- Derek McGrath as Mike
- Tymika Tafari as Christina

== Production ==
The film is directed by Steve Carr and written by Holly Hester. An ensemble cast features Alicia Silverstone, Melissa Joan Hart and Jameela Jamil. Paula Hart and Melissa Joan Hart are producers for Hartbreak Films.

Principal photography began in Toronto on 3 February 2025, with filming lasting into March 2025.

== Release ==
In January 2025, the film was included on Netflix slate of films for 2025. In August 2025, it was announced that the film would be released on November 12, 2025.

== Reception ==
On the review aggregator website Rotten Tomatoes, 56% of 18 critics' reviews are positive.
