= Natalie Knepp =

American actress (born–)

Natalie Knepp is an American actress who has appeared in films and TV series.

== Life ==
A native of Aurora, Ohio, Knepp's mother Roseann Canfora was "a veteran of Northeast Ohio theater" who encouraged Knepp to pursue acting. Knepp attended Aurora High School, during which time she was cast as Juliet in a production of Romeo and Juliet at Weathervane Playhouse.

He television roles include Eugenia Bankhead in Z: The Beginning of Everything, Sophie in Think Tank, and Katie Dunhill in the 2009–2010 TV series Old Friends. She starred in the Nicholas Brooks romantic comedy Sam, and appeared in Orange Is the New Black and Gossip Girl. She also appeared in Blue Bloods, Season 1, Episode 22 as Laura Peck.

In 2017, she had a starring role in the TV movie, A Joyous Christmas.

In 2021, she was part of the ensemble cast of the comedy, Making the Day, and appeared in the TV miniseries Chronicles of a BLEEP Year Old Woman.

== Filmography ==
- Bridge and Tunnel (2014) as Lina
- Alto (2015) as Nicolette Bellafusco
- Sam (2016)
- A Joyous Christmas (2017)
- Impossible Monsters (2019) as Leigh
