= Jessie Ennis =

American actor

- Born: Boston, Massachusetts, USA
- Occupations: Actress, director, writer
- Years active: 2005–present
- Known for: Mythic Quest, Better Call Saul
- Father: John Ennis

Jessie Ennis is an American actress, director, and writer.

== Personal life ==
Ennis was born in Boston but moved to Los Angeles at the age of 2. She is the daughter of American actor and comedian John Ennis. She graduated from Sarah Lawrence College.

== Career ==
Ennis began her acting career in the early 2010s with roles in sitcoms such as Veep and Married. During this time she also had roles in comedy films such as G.B.F. (2013) with Natasha Lyonne and Megan Mullally, and Hits with Meredith Hagner and Matt Walsh.

In 2012 she released a short film entitled The Arm, which she co-wrote and co-directed with friends Brie Larson and Sarah Ramos.

Ennis continued her work in film and television with her role as Debbie in Life of the Party starring Melissa McCarthy and Maya Rudolph. She also played the role of Rachel in The House starring Will Ferrell and Amy Poehler. She also played Erin Brill in Better Call Saul starring Bob Odenkirk and Rhea Seehorn. She gained wider recognition starring as Jo, a power-hungry and ruthless assistant, in the comedy series Mythic Quest on Apple TV+. She had a recurring role as Jenny in season 2 of The Flight Attendant, a thriller series on HBO Max with Kaley Cuoco and Rosie Perez.

In 2021 Ennis co-hosted a podcast with Brie Larson titled Learning Lots. The podcast explored topics such as regret, reflection, and flow.

== Filmography ==
=== Television ===
Television work by Jessie Ennis
Year	Title	Role	Notes
2014	Married	Gillian	1 episode
2014	Red Band Society	Water Girl	3 episodes
2015	Veep	Leigh Patterson	4 episodes
2015	W/ Bob & David	Jess Tavis	1 episode
2016	Drunk History	Ella Cherry	1 episode
2017–2018	Love	Stella Emmett	4 episodes
2016–2022	Better Call Saul	Erin Brill	10 episodes
2022	The Flight Attendant	Jenny	6 episodes
2020–2025	Mythic Quest	Jo	Main role
2023–2025	Ghosts	Kelsey	2 episodes

=== Film ===
Film acting work by Jessie Ennis
Year	Title	Role	Notes
2005	Shards	Jenna	
2013	G.B.F	Viola	
2014	Hits	Juli	
2014	Helicopter Mom	Hannah	
2016	Slash	Martine	
2016	Dumb Prince	Princess Jana	TV movie
2017	Fun Mom Dinner	Francesca	
2017	Men	Bree	Short film
2017	The House	Rachel	
2017	The Disaster Artist	Receptionist	
2018	Irreplaceable You	Melanie	
2018	Family	Erin	
2018	Life of the Party	Debbie	
2018	25	Becca	TV movie
2020	Valley Girl	Stacey	
2020	Superintelligence	Pedestrian	

Filmmaking work by Jessie Ennis
Year	Title	Director	Writer	Notes
2012	The Arm	Yes	Yes	Short film
2013	The Way I Loved You	Yes	Yes	Short film

== Accolades ==
Ennis received a Special Jury Award for Comedic Storytelling at the 2012 Sundance Film Festival for her short film The Arm. She accepted this award with fellow co-writers and co-directors Brie Larson and Sarah Ramos.
