= Amit Sial =

Indian actor from Kanpur, Uttar Pradesh (born 1975)

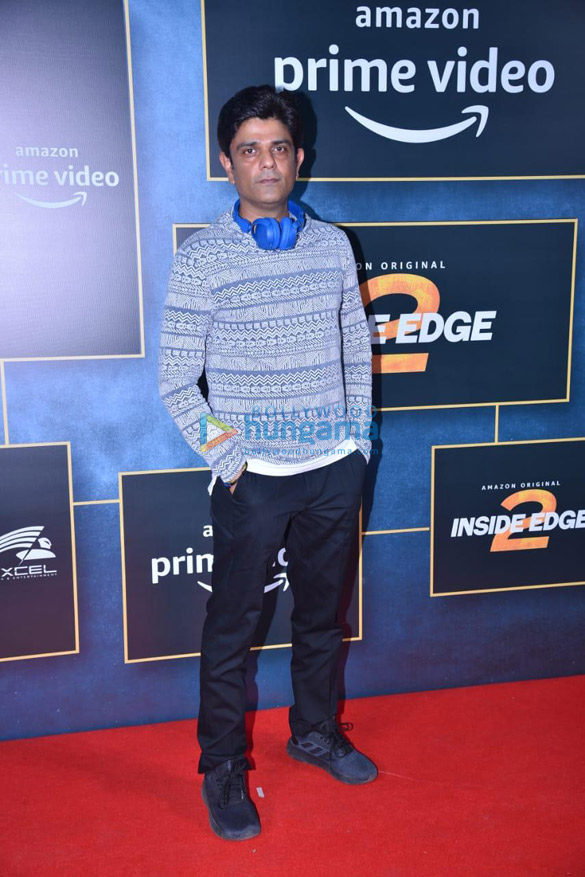
- Sial at the special screening of web series Inside Edge season 2
- Born: 1 July 1975 (age 50); Kanpur, Uttar Pradesh, India
- Occupation: Actor
- Years active: 2004–present
- Spouse: Aanchal Sial
- Children: 1

Amit Sial (born 1 July 1975) is an Indian actor known for his works in Hindi cinema and television. He is best known for his work in the television series Mirzapur, Maharani, Jamtara, Kathmandu Connection and Inside Edge.

== Early and personal life ==
Sial was born on 1 July 1975 in Kanpur, Uttar Pradesh, India in a Punjabi family.

He went to Swinburne University to pursue PG Diploma in International Business in Melbourne, Australia. He did odd jobs such as working in restaurants and driving taxis to support his life in Australia. It was in Australia that he met fellow aspiring actor Randeep Hooda, with whom he bonded over shared ambitions in acting, reportedly working as cab drivers together while envisioning future careers in the Indian film industry.

== Acting career ==
He moved to Delhi in late 2002, and later to Mumbai to pursue a career in Bollywood in 2004. He has since appeared in the film Love Sex Aur Dhokha (2010) and the web series Maharani (2021).

He has also appeared in Charlie Kay Chakkar Mein (2015), which he co-wrote and co-produced.

== Selected filmography ==
Key
†	Denotes films that have not yet been released

=== Films ===
Year	Film	Role	Notes
2006	Hope and a Little Sugar	Ali Siddiqui	
2010	Phas Gaye Re Obama	Supporting	
2010	Love Sex aur Dhokha	Prabhat	
2010	Peter Gaya Kaam Se		
2013	Issaq	Murari	
2013	Coffin Maker	Murli	
2014	Kuku Mathur Ki Jhand Ho Gayi	Prabhakar Sala	
2015	Guddu Rangeela	Police Inspector Ajay Singh	
2015	Charlie Kay Chakkar Mein	Sam	
2015	Titli	Pradeep	
2018	Raid	Lallan Sudheer	
2019	Sonchiriya		
2019	Bombairiya	Inspector D'Souza	
2021	Aafat-E-Ishq	Prem Gunjan	ZEE5 film
2023	Qala	Music Director	
2024	Jo Tera Hai Woh Mera Hai	Mitesh Meghani	
2024	Tikdam	Prakash	
2024	Swatantrya Veer Savarkar	Ganesh Damodar Savarkar	
2025	Kesari Chapter 2	Tirath Singh	
2025	Raid 2	Lallan Sudheer	
2026	Rahu Ketu	Deepak Sharma	

=== Television ===
Year	Title	Role	Network	Notes	Ref.
2017–present	Inside Edge	Devender Mishra	Amazon Prime Video		
2018–present	Mirzapur	IPS Ram Sharan Maurya	Amazon Prime Video		
2018	Damaged	Abhay Singh Parihar	Hungama Play		
2018	Smoke	Pushkar	Eros Now		
2019–present	Hostages	Peter	JioHotstar		
2019	Rangbaaz Phirse	Balram	Zee5		
2020	Jamtara – Sabka Number Ayega	Brajesh Bhan	Netflix		
2020	A Simple Murder	Santosh	Sony Liv		
2021–present	Maharani	Chief Minister of Bihar Navin Kumar	Sony Liv		
2021	Kathmandu Connection	Samarth Kaushik	Sony Liv		
2023	Commando	Jaffer Hassan	JioHotstar		
2023	Inspector Avinash	Azimuddin Ghulam Sheikh	JioHotstar		
2025	The Hunt: The Rajiv Gandhi Assassination Case	D.R. Kaarthikeyan	SonyLIV		
