= A Dark Quiet Death =

- Mythic Quest episode
- Doc and Bean pitch their game to a publisher
- Episode no.: Season 1 Episode 5
- Directed by: Rob McElhenney
- Written by: Katie McElhenney
- Original release date: February 7, 2020

Guest appearances
- Jake Johnson as Michael / "Doc"; Cristin Milioti as Bean; Geoffrey Owens as Tom

Episode chronology
← Previous "The Convention"	Next → "Non-Player Character"

"A Dark Quiet Death" is the fifth episode of the first season of the American comedy television series Mythic Quest. It is a stand-alone episode. It was written by Katie McElhenney and directed by series co-creator Rob McElhenney. It was released on Apple TV+ on February 7, 2020.

The episode follows the lifecycle of a fictional game titled Dark Quiet Death from its inception to demise.

The episode received widespread critical acclaim.

== Plot ==
Doc (Jake Johnson), a video game producer, and Bean (Cristin Milioti), a passionate gamer, meet and bond over their shared love of gaming, nicknaming each other after the Sega game Dr. Robotnik's Mean Bean Machine. They fall in love and collaborate on their dream project, Dark Quiet Death, an experimental survival horror game. With funding from a Montreal-based publisher, the game becomes a surprise hit, leading them to establish their own studio.

As the franchise grows, publisher pressure forces changes that clash with Bean's creative vision. Doc embraces the compromises for financial success, while Bean resists, leading to tensions that ultimately end their marriage. Over time, Doc remarries and marketing influences reshape Dark Quiet Death into something unrecognizable, culminating in the introduction of a child-friendly mascot. This proves too much for Doc, who issues an ultimatum and eventually leaves the company.

Years later, Doc, now no longer in the industry, runs into Bean at a video game store. Their conversation mirrors their first meeting, but their lives have diverged—Bean is remarried with a child, while Doc, now divorced again, remains nostalgic for their past. As Bean leaves, Doc lingers, reflecting on the original game they created together before quietly exiting the store.

At the end, Ian (Rob McElhenney) is seen introducing Mythic Quest to the same Montreal-based publisher that funded Dark Quiet Death.

== Production ==
=== Development ===
The episode was directed by series creator Rob McElhenney. It was written by Katie McElhenney.

McElhenney reached out to Milioti and Johnson asking if they'd like to be in an episode, which they both agreed.

=== Writing ===
While the episode was written by Katie McElhenney, Johnson praised her for her writing in an interview, but that he and Milioti were allowed to add "themselves" to the dialogue to feel more natural.

=== Filming ===
The dancing scene after they received funding was choreographed, according to Milioti.

== Critical reviews ==
"A Dark Quiet Death" received critical acclaim.

Adam Rosenburg of Mashable praised the episode, writing the episode "is a genuinely moving and heartfelt piece of storytelling that's worth your time." Kayla Cobb of Decider described the episode as "a masterclass in storytelling," and Angela Tricarico called it "a stunning episode of television."

On TechCrunch's podcast Original Content, the episode was praised and stated its only criticism is that "the rest of the show feels silly in comparison." Jake Kleinman of Inverse called the episode the best of the series, and stated the episode is "proof that the team behind Mythic Quest is capable of greatness."

Dalton Cooper of GameRant called the episode "the most compelling so far," and praised Johnson and Milioti's performances. He additionally compared the treatment of the Dark Quiet Death franchise to the Resident Evil franchise.

Kathryn VanArendonk of Vulture commented on the episode when comparing it to a similar stand-alone episode of High Fidelity about how it fit in to the show, stating the episode justified its existence and praised the risk it took showing brand new characters to tell the story.

=== Accolades ===
In February 2025, Leon Miller of The Escapist awarded the episode the "Best Video Game Show Episode Ever," and respected the risk it took for being unexpected and experimental, but stated it "stuck the landing," and that it made the rest of the series more satisfying.
