= Charlie Kay Chakkar Mein =

- Directed by: Manish Srivastav
- Written by: Amit Sial; Manish Srivastav
- Produced by: Karan Arora
- Starring: Naseeruddin Shah; Anand Tiwari; Manasi Rachh; Amit Sial
- Cinematography: S V Visheshwar
- Edited by: Archit D Rastogi; Ashmith Kunder
- Music by: Rohit Kulkarni; Harry Anand; Vishal Mishra; Arfaaz (BGM); Anurag (BGM)
- Production company: Picture Thoughts Production
- Distributed by: Custard Apple Pictures
- Release date: 6 November 2015
- Running time: 102 minutes
- Country: India
- Language: Hindi

Charlie Kay Chakkar Mein (transl. In Charlie's trap) is a 2015 Bollywood neo-noir crime thriller film written and directed by Manish Srivastav.

== Cast ==
- Naseeruddin Shah as Sanket Pujari
- Anand Tiwari as Deepak Kumar
- Manasi Rachh as Nina
- Amit Sial as Sam
- Subrat Dutta as Sohail
- Vikas Anand as Hussaini (guest appearance)
- Sanam Singh as Rahil
- Siraj Mustafa as Jabbar
- Auroshikha Dey as Sameera the cop
- Disha Arora as Hera (Debut)
- Nishant Lal (Debut)
- Aanchal Nandrajog
- Sandeep Vasudevan
- Shweta Sharma (sizzling appearance in "I am Single")
- Elena Fernandes (sizzling appearance in "Let's Playboy")

== Plot ==
Four youngsters addicted to drugs get involved in an accident concerning a gangster.

== Production ==
This film has been shot in Mumbai, Maharashtra (India).

== Soundtrack ==
Film's soundtrack was composed, sung and written by Harry Anand, Rohit Kulkarni, Vishal Mishra, Gurinder Seagal.

No.	Title	Writer(s)	Singer(s)	Length
1.	"I am Single"	Harry Anand, Rohit Kulkarni, Vishal Mishra, Gurinder Seagal	Harry Anand	4:10
2.	"Charlie Kay Chakkar Mein"	Harry Anand, Rohit Kulkarni, Vishal Mishra, Gurinder Seagal	Neha Kakkar	3:12
3.	"Charlie Kay Chakkar Mein (Opening Track)"	Harry Anand, Rohit Kulkarni, Vishal Mishra, Gurinder Seagal	Nisha Mascarence	4:51
4.	"Saali Bhand"	Harry Anand, Rohit Kulkarni, Vishal Mishra, Gurinder Seagal	Amit Sial	3:46
5.	"Let's Playboy"
Total length:				15:59

== Release ==
This film has released in India on 6 November 2015 to mixed reviews.

== See also ==
- False confession
