= NH-8: Road to Nidhivan =

- Directed by: Munindra Gupta
- Written by: Munindra Gupta
- Produced by: Sunil Goel; Niharika Jha
- Starring: Auroshikha Dey; Ravneet Kaur; Satyakaam Anand; Arjun Fauzdar; Tarun Foujdar; Swaroopa Ghosh
- Cinematography: Mailesan Rangaswamy
- Edited by: Prakash Jha
- Music by: Debprito Saha
- Distributed by: Sunny Khanna
- Release date: 17 April 2015
- Running time: 100 minutes
- Country: India
- Language: Hindi

NH-8: Road to Nidhivan is an Indian psychological thriller film directed by Munindra Gupta and produced by Sunil Goel and Niharika Jha. The film was released on 17 April 2015.

== Plot ==
The film is inspired by stories of the mysterious conception of Nidhivan, a place near Mathura. The film is set against the backdrop of a road trip of four friends from Mumbai to Nidhivan.

== Cast ==
- Auroshikha Dey
- Ravneet Kaur
- Satyakaam Anand
- Arjun Fauzdar
- Swaroopa Ghosh
- Jatin Sarna
