= Mythic Quest =

American comedy television series

- Season 1 title card
- Also known as: Mythic Quest: Raven's Banquet (season 1)
- Genre: Comedy
- Created by: Charlie Day; Megan Ganz; Rob McElhenney
- Starring: Rob McElhenney; Ashly Burch; Jessie Ennis; Imani Hakim; David Hornsby; Charlotte Nicdao; Danny Pudi; F. Murray Abraham; Naomi Ekperigin
- Composer: Takeshi Furukawa
- Country of origin: United States
- Original language: English
- No. of seasons: 4
- No. of episodes: 40

Production
- Executive producers: Charlie Day; Megan Ganz; David Hornsby; Rob McElhenney; David Gordon Green; Nicholas Frenkel; Michael Rotenberg; Jason Altman; Danielle Kreinik; Gérard Guillemot
- Producers: Chris Smirnoff; Jeff Luini
- Cinematography: Mike Berlucchi
- Editors: Trevor Penna; Josh Drisko; Steve Welch
- Running time: 22–37 minutes
- Production companies: RCG Productions; 3 Arts Entertainment; Ubisoft Film & Television; Lionsgate Television

Original release
- Network: Apple TV+
- Release: February 7, 2020 – March 26, 2025

Related
- Side Quest

Mythic Quest (known as Mythic Quest: Raven's Banquet for its first season) is an American comedy television series created by Charlie Day, Megan Ganz, and Rob McElhenney for Apple TV+. The series premiered on February 7, 2020, and follows a fictional video game studio that produces a popular MMORPG called Mythic Quest.

In January 2020, ahead of its first season premiere, the series was renewed for a second season. A special episode, "Quarantine", was released in May 2020, and a second special episode, "Everlight", was released in April 2021. The second season premiered in May 2021. In October 2021, the series was renewed for a third and fourth season, which premiered in November 2022 and January 2025 respectively. In April 2025, the series was canceled after four seasons, and the fourth season finale received an updated ending.

A spinoff series, Side Quest, premiered in March 2025.

== Premise ==
The series follows a fictional video game studio that produces Mythic Quest, a popular MMORPG, run by the game's creator and creative director Ian Grimm (Rob McElhenney). At the start of the series, the studio is about to release a major expansion pack to the game, Raven's Banquet. Ian argues with lead engineer Poppy Li (Charlotte Nicdao); executive producer David Brittlesbee (David Hornsby) and head of monetization Brad Bakshi (Danny Pudi) about aspects of developing the game.

== Cast and characters ==
=== Main ===
- Rob McElhenney as Ian Grimm (/ˈaɪən/ EYE-ən), the creator and creative director of Mythic Quest and later GrimPop
  - Judah Prehn portrays a young Ian Grimm ("Sarian")
- Ashly Burch as Rachel Meyee, a game tester and later the head of monetization for Mythic Quest
- Jessie Ennis as Jo, the executive assistant for David, later Brad and then Dana
- Imani Hakim as Dana Bryant, a game tester and later a game designer for Mythic Quest
- David Hornsby as David Brittlesbee, the executive producer of Mythic Quest
- Charlotte Nicdao as Poppy Li, the lead engineer and later co-creative director of Mythic Quest and later GrimPop
  - Isla Rose Hall portrays a young Poppy Liwanag ("Sarian")
- Danny Pudi as Brad Bakshi, the head of monetization, later a janitor and then a financial advisor for Mythic Quest
- F. Murray Abraham as C.W. Longbottom (seasons 1–2), the head writer of Mythic Quest
  - Josh Brener portrays a young Carl Longbottom ("Backstory!")
- Naomi Ekperigin as Carol (seasons 3–4; recurring seasons 1–2), the head of human resources and later the head of diversity and inclusion for Mythic Quest

=== Recurring ===
- Caitlin McGee as Sue Gorgon (seasons 1–2; guest seasons 3–4), the community manager for Mythic Quest
- Elisha Henig as Brendan / "Pootie_Shoe" (season 1; guest season 4), a popular livestreamer who plays Mythic Quest
- Aparna Nancherla as Michelle (season 1), a programmer on Poppy's team working on Mythic Quest
- John DiMaggio as Dan Williams (season 1; guest season 4), the executive producer of Cold Alliance, Mythic Quest's main competitor
- Craig Mazin as Lou (season 1), a replacement game tester for Mythic Quest
  - Mazin also portrays Sol Green ("Backstory!")
- Humphrey Ker as Paul (season 1; guest season 2), an exceptionally tall developer for Mythic Quest
- Derek Waters as Phil Birch (seasons 2–3), the head of the art department for Mythic Quest
- Mort Burke as Anthony (seasons 2–3; guest season 4), a bespectacled programmer working on Mythic Quest
- Ben Stillwell as Kai (season 3), part of a pair of young game testers for Mythic Quest who replace Rachel and Dana
- Austin Zajur as Travor (season 3), the other young tester
- Andrew Friedman as Andy (seasons 3–4), part of a pair of middle-aged game testers for Mythic Quest who are diversity, equity, and inclusion (DEI) hires
- Michael Naughton as Mikey (seasons 3–4), the other middle-aged tester
- Alanna Ubach as Shannon (season 4; guest seasons 1, 3), Ian's ex-girlfriend and Brendan's mother
- Chase Yi as Storm (season 4), an artist and Poppy's boyfriend
- Karolina Szymczak as Anna Nowak (season 4), the head of monetization for Sea of Destiny (a competitor to Dana's game Cozy Galaxy) and an ex-lover of Brad

=== Guest ===
- Sean Philip Glasgow ("The Convention") and Tyler Lawrence Gray ("Rebrand") as "LOL_Trevor"
- Jake Johnson as Michael / "Doc" ("A Dark Quiet Death"), a video game developer and Bean's partner on the Dark Quiet Death video game (Note: Johnson and Milioti are credited among the main cast for the single episode in which they appear.)
- Cristin Milioti as Bean ("A Dark Quiet Death"), a video game developer and Doc's partner on the Dark Quiet Death video game
- Geoffrey Owens as Tom ("A Dark Quiet Death")
- Anthony Hopkins as the Narrator ("Everlight") (Note: Credited as "Special Guest Star".)
- Jason Fuchs as Strauss ("#YumYum")
- Parvesh Cheena as Zack Bakshi ("Breaking Brad" & "TBD")
- Snoop Dogg as himself ("Breaking Brad")
- Shelley Hennig as A. E. Goldsmith ("Backstory!")
  - Hennig also portrays Ginny Cromwell ("Peter")
- William Hurt as Peter Cromwell ("Peter")
  - Michael Cassidy portrays a young Peter Cromwell ("Backstory!")
- Joe Manganiello as himself ("The Two Joes" & "The Year of Phil")
- Lindsey Kraft as Sarah Grimm ("Sarian")
- Hayley Magnus as Olivia Liwanag ("Sarian")
- Casey Sander as Grandpop Joe ("Sarian")
- Dionysio Basco as Benito Liwanag ("Sarian")
- Sam Witwer as Ian Grimm Sr. ("Sarian")
- Robert Picardo as Principal Taggart ("Sarian")
- Brittany Ross as Jackie ("1000%")
- Sophia Adele Saux as Yara ("Second Skeleton")
- Natasha Liu Bordizzo as Tracy Liwanag ("The Fish and the Whale")
  - Alyssa Aure portrays a young Tracy Liwanag ("Sarian")
- Travis Schuldt as Louis ("The Fish and the Whale")
- Donald Cerrone as himself ("Rebrand")
- Charlie Day as Spencer ("Rebrand")
- Andy LeBuhn as Jean-Georges ("Heaven and Hell")

== Episodes ==
Season	Episodes	Originally released	
Season	Episodes	First released	Last released
1	9	February 7, 2020	
Specials	2	May 22, 2020	April 16, 2021
2	9	May 7, 2021	June 25, 2021
3	10	November 11, 2022	January 6, 2023
4	10	January 29, 2025	March 26, 2025

=== Season 1: Raven's Banquet (2020) ===
No. overall	No. in season	Title	Directed by	Written by	Original release date
1	1	"Pilot"	David Gordon Green	Charlie Day & Megan Ganz & Rob McElhenney	February 7, 2020
David hires Jo, his new assistant, who immediately begins siding with Ian's opinions, often against David's wishes. In the newest expansion of the game, Raven's Banquet, Poppy creates an in-game item, a shovel, despite Ian's protests. Poppy leaks the shovel to Pootie Shoe, a popular game streamer, who criticizes it. Ian agrees to leave the shovel in the game as long as it can be used as a weapon in addition to Poppy's intended use of in-game digging.
2	2	"The Casino"	Todd Biermann & David Gordon Green	David Hornsby	February 7, 2020
Pootie Shoe draws attention to the Masked Man, a non-player character with a hidden identity. Ian has claimed since its release that there is a backstory behind the character but reveals that he is still trying to create it. Brad attempts to use the Masked Man to introduce an in-game casino concept to increase profits, but Poppy immediately insults him and tells him that he is not an important member of the team. Brad revolts by leaving the office and makes all in-game items free for purchase. David and Poppy admit they need Brad, as monetizing the game is the only way to support it. Ian and CW decide to create a second character, The White Knight, who is the Masked Man's son. Despite the similarities to the plot of Star Wars, the team decides to proceed with this plot line.
3	3	"Dinner Party"	Todd Biermann	Megan Ganz	February 7, 2020
The Mythic Quest team learns that their game has become an online hangout for Nazis, and attempts to fix their public relations issue. Ian resists an outright ban of Nazis, while Brad, C.W., and David try to determine what types of people should be removed from the game. Poppy releases a new part of the game called Dinner Party, which allows like-minded users to meet and talk. During an in-game anti-Nazi rally, the Nazis use Dinner Party to meet one another and destroy the rally. Poppy and Ian realize that Dinner Party allowed them to see every player who identifies as a Nazi, and move them to an isolated server.
4	4	"The Convention"	David Gordon Green	John Howell Harris	February 7, 2020
Pootie Shoe announces that he will no longer be playing Mythic Quest. Ian, Brad, Poppy, and Dana attend a gaming convention to find a new person to stream their game. When there are no successful picks, Poppy realizes that Dana would be an ideal candidate to stream the game online. A Girls Who Code group shows up at the office for a tour, and is disappointed when David is only able to find a few women to speak with them.
5	5	"A Dark Quiet Death"	Rob McElhenney	Katie McElhenney	February 7, 2020
The complete lifecycle from birth to bargain bin of the game Dark Quiet Death. In a mid-credits scene, Ian is shown pitching his game in the same way Doc and Beans did.
6	6	"Non-Player Character"	LP	David Hornsby	February 7, 2020
Poppy takes a tour of Cold Alliance Games and sees what the other side looks like while Ian feels threatened by Paul, a new programmer. Dana starts her new job as a streamer. David deals with a glitch in the game, that is later determined to be caused by an outsider hacking the program. Lou replaces Dana as a tester working with Rachel.
7	7	"Permadeath"	Todd Biermann	Aparna Nancherla & Ashly Burch	February 7, 2020
Ian challenges the hacker to an in-game showdown. Poppy helps Ian prepare for it. Ian ends up beating the Masked Man, who turns out to be Pootie Shoe.
8	8	"Brendan"	Pete Chatmon	Megan Ganz	February 7, 2020
Ian takes Poppy with him to a mysterious meeting, which turns out to be with Pootie Shoe, who is secretly Ian's son, and who is living with his mother. Poppy feels loyal to Ian and leaves a message declining the new job from Cold Alliance Games. She later changes her mind, but after calling back, is told that the job is no longer there for her. Dana gets outed that she is actually a company employee, rather than an independent streamer.
9	9	"Blood Ocean"	Catriona McKenzie	Megan Ganz & Rob McElhenney	February 7, 2020
The workers at Mythic Quest want to be paid for their overtime work. David calls up corporate to support them but is fired. Poppy and Ian argue, and Ian calls Montreal and gets David rehired and overtime pay for all. Ian promotes Poppy to be Co-Creative Director with him.

=== Specials (2020–21) ===
No. overall	Title	Directed by	Written by	Original release date
10	"Quarantine"	Rob McElhenney	Rob McElhenney & Megan Ganz & David Hornsby	May 22, 2020
The staff deals with virtual meetings amid the pandemic. Brad and David have Street Fighter contests to decide whether or not the company will make a charity donation. Ian visits a distraught Poppy where she lives.
11	"Everlight"	Rob McElhenney	Ashly Burch	April 16, 2021
The team returns to the office for their annual Everlight party. Poppy and Ian try to rig a LARP tournament in favor of Dana, but Brad ends up winning the tournament instead, and with his win, he forces Poppy and Ian to cancel future Everlight parties. Poppy and Ian then challenge Brad and end up defeating him, which means Everlight parties can continue in the future.

=== Season 2 (2021) ===
No. overall	No. in season	Title	Directed by	Written by	Original release date
12	1	"Titans' Rift"	Pete Chatmon	Megan Ganz & David Hornsby & Rob McElhenney	May 7, 2021
Ian goes on sabbatical and leaves Poppy to work on the new expansion and its name. Dana and Rachel kiss for the first time and express their true feelings for each other. Jo is no longer David's assistant and is now working for Brad. Poppy has sex dreams about Ian, which leads her to the name of the new expansion: Titans' Rift.
13	2	"Grouchy Goat"	Pete Chatmon	Megan Ganz & David Hornsby & Rob McElhenney	May 7, 2021
Rachel and Dana are unsure how to tell the office that they are now dating. Brad assigns them to design a profitable mobile game, with Jo acting as producer. Ian and Poppy work with the design team for the new expansion, but Poppy has trouble being inspirational. To help her be an effective leader, Ian has Poppy speak at a Women in Gaming conference. After hearing Rachel and Dana explain their new mobile game, Brad ends up scrapping it.
14	3	"#YumYum"	Angela Barnes	John Howell Harris	May 14, 2021
Ian and Poppy work separately on the expansion, Jo helps C.W. deal with his publisher, and Brad sets out to find a romantic partner for David.
15	4	"Breaking Brad"	Angela Barnes	Keyonna Taylor	May 21, 2021
Brad's brother Zack visits the office, which Brad interprets as a sign that he will try to break up the company. Poppy receives a Porsche from corporate headquarters due to the success of Battle Royale. Rachel helps Ian drive Poppy's car back to the office, as Ian is unable to drive stick. Ian mentors Rachel to decide what she wants to do at the company.
16	5	"Please Sign Here"	Megan Ganz	Katie McElhenney	May 28, 2021
Carol tries to wrangle Mythic Quest employees as they refuse to sign the results of a simple workplace assessment. Poppy and Ian get into an argument. Ian tries to open up to her but - trying to present strength - she is dismissive, as a result, Ian insults Poppy about her needing to rely on him to be successful.
17	6	"Backstory!"	Rob McElhenney	Craig Mazin	June 4, 2021
A flashback episode detailing a young Carl Longbottom's journey to become one of the world's greatest science fiction writers.
18	7	"Peter"	Todd Biermann	Humphrey Ker	June 11, 2021
Rachel accompanies C.W. on a visit to Peter's home, his former colleague who married Anne, who C.W. was in love with more than 40 years ago. Peter is dying, so Ginny, Peter's daughter, secretly sets up a meeting to see if they can hash things out and become friends again.
19	8	"Juice Box"	Todd Biermann	Megan Ganz & David Hornsby & Rob McElhenney	June 18, 2021
After Ian presents his half of the expansion, he ends up in the hospital with an apparent heart attack. Poppy's expansion is well-received but is later discovered to be impossible to implement. Jo is duped by Zack to buy shares of the company, as Brad tells her she can be arrested for insider trading.
20	9	"TBD"	Todd Biermann	Randall Valdez-Castillo	June 25, 2021
Rachel and Dana tender their resignations to David, but then have second thoughts after Dana is rejected from Berkeley. When Dana pleads for her job back to Ian and Poppy, they unexpectedly tell her that they will pay for her to go to school to learn how to program. Ian and Poppy realize that they cannot take Mythic Quest any further, so they resign and form a new company. Brad wants to be arrested by the Feds for insider trading to improve his "street cred."

=== Season 3 (2022–23) ===
No. overall	No. in season	Title	Directed by	Written by	Original release date
21	1	"Across the Universe"	Rob McElhenney	Megan Ganz & David Hornsby & Rob McElhenney	November 11, 2022
22	2	"Partners"	Rob McElhenney	Megan Ganz & David Hornsby & Rob McElhenney	November 11, 2022
23	3	"Crushing It"	Steve Welch	Naomi Ekperigin	November 18, 2022
24	4	"The Two Joes"	Nina Pedrad	John Howell Harris	November 23, 2022
25	5	"Playpen"	Danny Pudi	Kyle Mack	December 2, 2022
Ian is obsessing over the upcoming Mythic Quest movie and he decides to talk to David and Jo about getting a bigger role in its production. Dana persuades Poppy to play some VR games that were created using the Playpen program Poppy made to distract her. Realizing those games are more fun and appealing to players than the project she's been working on for a year, Poppy falls into despair, before Dana helps her see that Playpen is what she should focus her energy on. David reprimands Rachel, Brad, and Carol for adding a new monetization tool into Mythic Quest without consulting him. The Montreal higher-ups end up promoting Carol for the stunt, while Brad cajoles Rachel into accepting the job as Head of Monetization at the company.
26	6	"The 12 Hours of Christmas"	David Hornsby	Humphrey Ker	December 9, 2022
David is keeping the staff in the office for Christmas, and tries and fails to infuse some holiday cheer. Poppy and Ian try to help by throwing a party for the Mythic Quest staff at GrimPop, but David gets angry at them for stealing his holiday plans and forces the staff back to work. Meanwhile, Rachel launches her first monetization tool, and garners a million dollars in profit in one day. Rachel, Brad, Dana, Poppy and Ian work together to give the staff bonuses from the monetization and turn the MQ office into a winter wonderland.
27	7	"Sarian"	Megan Ganz & Todd Biermann	Katie McElhenney	December 16, 2022
In 1987, Ian is a young boy who'd rather spend his time inventing a new world, named Sarian than do his actual school assignments. His divorced mother supports him in this while exhibiting signs of bipolar disorder. After he mentions to his principal that his mother is having a "bed day", his father is notified and takes Ian into his custody. In 2001, Poppy is a young girl obsessed with playing video games and frustrated at a lack of Internet access. Her Filipino father convinces her to treat an upcoming piano recital like a final boss in a video game, and she then requests a bicycle as her reward. Upon getting the bicycle, she immediately goes to the library and accesses the Internet, where she gets access to a trove of user-created games, including one called Sarian. In 2009, Poppy is in a class at MIT on video game design listening to Ian talk about creating video games. When she mentions that playing Sarian inspired her to write her own games, he starts telling her about a new idea he's had for an MMORPG, which he's calling "Grimquest".
28	8	"To Catch a Mouse"	Ashly Burch	Emma DePaulo Reid	December 23, 2022
29	9	"The Year of Phil"	Todd Biermann	Ashly Burch	December 30, 2022
30	10	"Buffalo Chicken Pizza"	Heath Cullens	Davis Kop	January 6, 2023
Poppy is depressed after no venture capital firms agree to fund Playpen, so Ian tries to fix their relationship issues by bringing her a buffalo chicken pizza from the gas station. She agrees, but only if he "meets her halfway" by eating the pizza himself. With the Mythic Quest movie being canceled and gamers leaving the game, David tries to gather new expansion ideas from the staff. Dana decides to form her own company and brings aboard both Jo and Brad, who are looking for new opportunities. She takes over the GrimPop space, while Poppy and Ian return to Mythic Quest to add user-generated Playpen content as a new expansion.

=== Season 4 (2025) ===
No. overall	No. in season	Title	Directed by	Written by	Original release date
31	1	"Boundaries"	Todd Biermann	Megan Ganz & David Hornsby	January 29, 2025
Ian wakes up in the middle of the night, having been inspired to make a new expansion, called Elysium. He goes to Poppy's house, tells her the idea, and is promptly kicked out, before Poppy heads back to bed with her new boyfriend, Storm. Dana has been working on the top game on Playpen and David, who has grown his hair out, is too preoccupied with her to care about Ian and Poppy's pitch. Dana doesn't care about the trophy David wanted to give her, instead asking Brad to get her out of her contract to MQ, as it was stopping her from profiting off of her Playpen game. Rachel and Dana talk about boundaries they should set in place, now that they work on opposite sides of the company (Rachel being management and Dana being creative). After Poppy leaves for a date at Storm's art show, David attempts to help Ian and Poppy patch the rift in their relationship by tricking Ian into going to the art show as well.
32	2	"1000%"	Charlotte Nicdao	David Hornsby	January 29, 2025
Sue and her sister inform David that players on Playpen have been creating sex games. In order to solve this, he organizes a second ethics committee meeting to figure out how to train AI moderation to automatically ban these games. Brad proposes "Playpennies" (a concept similar to the "Robux" in Roblox) as an in-game currency so that Dana can receive a form of compensation for her game. Poppy has created AI versions of herself and Ian, proposing that they work with themselves to see how difficult they can both be.
33	3	"Breakthrough"	Todd Biermann	John Howell Harris	February 5, 2025
Ian, David, and Jo embark on a day of self-discovery. Brad teaches Dana and Rachel about financial responsibility.
34	4	"The Villain's Feast"	Megan Ganz	Megan Ganz & Humphrey Ker	February 12, 2025
The Mythic Quest team is invited by a mysterious host to a remote island mansion for a party, where they play a game similar to Mafia (AKA Werewolf).
35	5	"Second Skeleton"	Ashly Burch	Ashly Burch	February 19, 2025
Poppy has found out that she is pregnant and Ian attempts to help her navigate this through Playpen games. When Ian gives up, Poppy leaves to speak to Ian's ex-wife to gain some knowledge regarding motherhood. David and Rachel speak about monetizing Mythic Quest, ending in Rachel finally deciding that David should kill Elysium. Meanwhile, Dana, Brad, and Jo attend an award ceremony for Playpen games, where Dana meets Yara, a 17-year-old game developer who was inspired by Dana's speech in Season 1, and Brad meets Anna, his ex-girlfriend, with whom he briefly leaves the ceremony to have sex with. It is revealed that Anna has been working with Yara as her head of monetization. When Poppy returns from discussing the news of her pregnancy with Storm, Ian breaks the news that David killed the expansion. Poppy decides that they should build it anyway and make it so good that David won't be able to kill it.
36	6	"The Fish and the Whale"	Heath Cullens	Brian Keith Etheridge	February 26, 2025
Through Brad's narration, we learn that Dana has been working on a new game as a way to get back at Yara, but in order for this game to belong to her, Brad needs to get her out of her contract. Brad forms a plan to get David to void it, by mousing his way into David's home poker games, which he hosts for his friends (a group of Republican first-responders). In order to get Ian, an essential part of his plan, away from Poppy, he tells Jo to host a baby shower for her. David makes the mistake of inviting Poppy's sister, Tracy, to the baby shower as well.
37	7	"The Room Where It Happens"	Imani Hakim	Amelie Gillette	March 5, 2025
David and Rachel face scrutiny over Playpen. Dana makes a difficult decision. Ian's attempt to help Poppy doesn't go as planned.
38	8	"Rebrand"	Todd Biermann	Elisha Henig	March 12, 2025
Pootie_Shoe attempts to rebrand himself by challenging a rival to an MMA fight.
39	9	"Telephone"	Danny Pudi	Asmita Paranjape	March 19, 2025
As Poppy considers a major life change, David scrambles to keep MQ afloat.
40	10	"Heaven and Hell"	Ashly Burch	Javier Scott	March 26, 2025 (Note: Following the cancellation of the series, "Heaven and Hell" received an updated ending scene on April 17, 2025.)
An unexpected visitor from Montreal evaluates MQ. Ian and Poppy face a pivotal decision.

== Production ==
=== Development ===
On August 9, 2018, it was announced that Apple had given a series order to a new half-hour comedy series written by Rob McElhenney, Megan Ganz, and Charlie Day, all of whom also serve as executive producers alongside Michael Rotenberg, Nicholas Frenkel, Gérard Guillemot, Jason Altman, and Danielle Kreinik. Production companies involved with the series consist of RCG Productions, 3 Arts Entertainment, and Ubisoft Film & Television.

McElhenney said the concept of the show resulted from a discussion video game developer Ubisoft had with him about producing a television show around video games. McElhenney had been invited to Ubisoft Montreal to discuss the project, and though he was initially hesitant, as he toured the studio, he saw the potential vision for the show. Since then, Ubisoft has assisted in designing the video game characters and game world, as well as providing other art assets for the show. Ubisoft also helped the writers with details of video game development to stay authentic to industry approaches.

The series was renewed for a second season ahead of the first season premiere. In October 2021, the series was renewed for a third and fourth season.

On April 11, 2025, the series was canceled after four seasons and the fourth season finale received an updated ending the following week, on April 17.

=== Casting ===
Rob McElhenney was confirmed to star in the series at the time of the initial series announcement, and F. Murray Abraham, Imani Hakim, David Hornsby, Danny Pudi, Ashly Burch, Charlotte Nicdao and Jessie Ennis subsequently joined the cast. Anthony Hopkins played the narrator in the special "Everlight". Humphrey Ker, Snoop Dogg, and Derek Waters guest starred in the second season. In April 2022, it was announced that Abraham had exited the series and would not return for the third season. Abraham had previously been warned after an allegation of sexual misconduct on the show's set, and was let go from the show after a second allegation against him was brought to McElhenney. Abraham issued a public apology for making jokes that offended his former colleagues. The third season saw Joe Manganiello appear in a guest role.

=== Filming ===
Filming of the first season concluded by March 2019. A special, titled Mythic Quest: Quarantine, was written, shot, and edited in just three weeks, all remotely during the COVID-19 pandemic, using products supplied by Apple, such as iPhones.

The second season suspended production in November 2020 after positive COVID-19 tests of production team members. The following month it was further reported that while McElhenney claimed "to date there remains ZERO evidence of any transmission at work", at least 12 members of the production staff that worked in close contact with one another had contracted COVID-19, marking the second cluster of COVID-19 cases linked to the Mythic Quest production, and prompting another production suspension.

During a Mythic Quest panel at the Television Critics Association's Winter Press Tour in February 2021, McElhenney stated that he "did not want to be known as the person who got F. Murray Abraham very, very ill", elaborating that Abraham's character was continuing to work remotely for the first few episodes, and did not actually shoot in person until episode seven of the second season, where COVID testing occurred "as many times as five days a week," and Abraham's scenes only included "very small amounts of people on camera". By March 2021, a total of 26 crew members of Mythic Quest came down with COVID-19, making it "the worst outbreak of any show in Los Angeles".

The fourth season started production in March 2024, after having been delayed because of the SAG-AFTRA and WGA strike and wrapped on May 4, 2024.

== Release ==
On June 10, 2019, a trailer for the series was presented by McElhenney at Ubisoft's E3 2019 press conference, where he announced that Mythic Quest would premiere in the fall of 2019. On December 18, 2019, it was announced that the series would premiere on February 7, 2020.

The first season consisting of nine episodes was released on February 7, 2020. A special episode ("Quarantine") focusing on the ongoing COVID-19 pandemic was released on May 22, 2020. A second special ("Everlight") was released on April 16, 2021, prior to the second season premiere. The second season premiered on May 7, 2021, with episodes released weekly.

The third season premiered on November 11, 2022, with an expanded episode order of ten episodes. The fourth season premiered on January 29, 2025.

== Reception ==
=== Critical response ===
Critical response of Mythic Quest
Season	Rotten Tomatoes	Metacritic
1	90% (39 reviews)	73 (12 reviews)
2	100% (32 reviews)	73 (9 reviews)
3	95% (21 reviews)	—N/a
4	95% (21 reviews)	83 (6 reviews)

==== Season 1 ====
The review aggregation website Rotten Tomatoes reported a 90% approval rating, based on 39 reviews, with an average rating of 7.7/10. The website's critical consensus reads, "While it relies too heavily on the workplace comedy formula, Mythic Quest: Raven's Banquet is nonetheless hilarious and stands out for exploring the gaming industry with intelligence, thoughtfulness, and sincerity." Metacritic, which uses a weighted average, assigned a score of 73 out of 100 based on reviews from 12 critics, indicating "generally favorable reviews".

==== Season 2 ====
The second season received positive reviews. On Rotten Tomatoes, it has an approval rating of 100% based on 32 reviews with an average rating of 8.2/10. The website's critical consensus reads, "Smartly written, sharply performed, and sentimental without losing its sense of humor, Mythic Quest's stellar second season solidifies its place as one of TV's best workplace comedies." On Metacritic, it has a score of 73 out of 100 based on 9 reviews, indicating "generally favorable reviews".

==== Season 3 ====
On Rotten Tomatoes, it has an approval rating of 95% based on 21 reviews with an average rating of 7.7/10. The website's critical consensus reads, "The core characters have gone their separate ways but Mythic Quest remains thematically cohesive as an acidic sendup of the gaming industry that never compromises its essence as a warm-hearted workplace comedy."

==== Season 4 ====
On Rotten Tomatoes, it has an approval rating of 95% based on 21 reviews with an average rating of 7.8/10. The website's critical consensus reads, "Much like a good RPG, Mythic Quest keeps expanding its world in clever ways while allowing its hapless characters to grow in surprising directions." On Metacritic, it has a score of 83 out of 100 based on 6 reviews, indicating "universal acclaim".

=== Accolades ===
Award	Year	Category	Nominee(s)	Result	Ref.
American Society of Cinematographers	2021	Outstanding Achievement in Cinematography in an Episode of a Half-Hour Television Series	Michael Berlucchi and Marc Carter (for "Backstory!")	Won	
Art Directors Guild	2021	Excellence in Production Design for a Half Hour Single-Camera Television Series	Mark Worthington (for "Pilot")	Nominated	
Hollywood Critics Association TV Awards	2021	Best Streaming Series, Comedy	Mythic Quest	Nominated	
Hollywood Critics Association TV Awards	2021	Best Actor in a Streaming Series, Comedy	Rob McElhenney	Nominated	
Hollywood Critics Association TV Awards	2021	Best Supporting Actor in a Streaming Series, Comedy	Danny Pudi	Nominated	
MPSE Golden Reel Awards	2022	Outstanding Achievement in Sound Editing – Half Hour – Comedy or Drama	Matthew E. Taylor, Pete Nichols, Matthew Wilson, Sean Heissinger, David Jobe, Elizabeth Rainey, Jody Holwadel Thomas, and Joe Deveau (for "Everlight")	Nominated	
Primetime Creative Arts Emmy Awards	2021	Outstanding Narrator	Anthony Hopkins (for "Everlight")	Nominated	
Primetime Creative Arts Emmy Awards	2021	Outstanding Sound Editing for a Comedy or Drama Series (Half-Hour) and Animation	Matthew E. Taylor, Sean Heissinger, Pete Nichols, Matthew Wilson, David Jobe, Joe Deveau, Jody Holwadel Thomas and Elizabeth Rainey (for "Everlight")	Nominated	
TCA Awards	2021	Outstanding Achievement in Comedy	Mythic Quest	Nominated	
TCA Awards	2021	Individual Achievement in Comedy	Charlotte Nicdao	Nominated	

The series was recognized with The ReFrame Stamp for hiring people of underrepresented gender identities, and of color.

== Other media ==
Inspired by the short story mentioned in the episode "Backstory!", Tears of the Anaren was released in June 2021 on Apple Books as an ebook and an audiobook, which is narrated by C.W. Longbottom (F. Murray Abraham) and Ian Grimm (Rob McElhenney).

== Spin-off ==
In December 2022, Apple TV+ ordered Mere Mortals, an eight-episode companion series created and written by Ashly Burch, John Howell Harris and Katie McElhenney. It focuses on new characters who are employees, players, and fans of the game Mythic Quest, and has been compared to the stand-alone episodes "A Dark Quiet Death" and "Backstory!". The series was later renamed to Side Quest, and released all four episodes on March 26, 2025.
