= The Warrior Queen of Jhansi =

2019 British period drama film

- Theatrical release poster
- Directed by: Swati Bhise
- Written by: Swati Bhise; Devika Bhise
- Produced by: Swati Bhise; Charles Salmon
- Starring: Devika Bhise; Rupert Everett; Derek Jacobi
- Cinematography: Seamus Deasy
- Edited by: Oral Norrie Ottay
- Music by: Tuomas Kantelinen
- Distributed by: PVR Pictures; Roadside Attractions (United States)
- Release dates: 10 March 2019 (Vancouver); 15 November 2019
- Running time: 104 minutes
- Country: United Kingdom
- Language: English
- Box office: $174,102

The Warrior Queen of Jhansi is a 2019 British period drama film on the 1857 Indian Rebellion against the British East India Company. The film was co-written, produced and directed by Swati Bhise, with Charles Salmon as co-producer. The film was originally titled Swords and Sceptres: The Rani of Jhansi. Devika Bhise, who also co-wrote the script, plays the lead role of Rani Lakshmibai. In November 2017, Rupert Everett and Derek Jacobi joined the cast. Principal photography was completed in December 2017.

== Synopsis ==
The film is a historical story of the Rani of Jhansi, a feminist icon in India and a fearless freedom fighter. She earned a reputation as the Joan of Arc of the East when in 1857 India, as a 24-year old general, she led her people into battle against the British Empire. Her insurrection shifted the balance of power in the region and set in motion the demise of the British East India Company and the beginning of the resistance against the ensuing British Raj under Queen Victoria.

== Cast ==
- Devika Bhise as Rani Lakshmi Bai
- Rupert Everett as General Sir Hugh Rose
- Ben Lamb as Major Robert Ellis
- Derek Jacobi as Lord Palmerston
- Jodhi May as Queen Victoria
- Nathaniel Parker as Sir Robert Hamilton
- Glenn Webster as Lord
- Terry Bamber as British Medical Officer
- Milind Gunaji as Gangadhar Rao
- Yatin Karyekar as Moropant
- Arif Zakaria as Gaus Khan
- Auroshikha Dey as Jhalkari Bai
- Mangap Sanap as Sundar
- Siyaa Patil as Mundar
- R. Bhakti Klein as Walrus Moustache
- Nagesh Bhonsle as Bakshish Ali
- Ajinkya Deo as Tatya Tope

== Release ==
In June 2019, Roadside Attractions acquired the US distribution rights and slated the film for a Fall 2019 release. The official trailer of the film was launched by RoadsideFlix on 17 September 2019.

The film was released theatrically in Canada 15 November 2019 and in the United Kingdom on 6 December 2019. Lionsgate later released the film on Starz after which it was available for streaming on Amazon Prime and Hulu.

== Critical reception ==
The film was screened at the British Film Festival and won the Impact Award at the Vancouver International Women in Film Festival 2019. The film was also a recipient of the ReFrame stamp for gender parity.

On review aggregator Rotten Tomatoes the film has an approval rating of 27% based on reviews from 37 critics, with an average rating of 4.4/10, . The website's critical consensus reads, "The Warrior Queen of Jhansi has a fascinating real-life character at its center, but her story is ill-served by this heavy-handed adaptation." On Metacritic, the film had a weighted average score of 27 out of 100, based on 9 reviews, indicating "generally unfavourable reviews".

Leslie Felperin of The Guardian gave the film 3 out of 5 stars, calling it an "impressive drama" where "Bhise brings an undeniable charisma to the central role" and a "rousing, passionate bit of film-making on a reasonably epic scale, with a cast of hundreds deployed for some big dusty battle scenes, which are duly impressive."

Rachit Gupta of The Times of India gave the film 2.5 out of 5 stars, stating that "with its heavy dialogue approach and constant attempt to showcase the characters as righteous, the film plays out like a costume drama." He did, however, praise the film's production value, particularly the casting. Joe Leydon of Variety lamented that "Unfortunately, despite some impressively executed battle sequences and a few aggressively colorful supporting performances, The Warrior Queen of Jhansi is too tepidly sincere to consistently excite or amuse." Jeannette Catsoulis, writing in The New York Times, said that "[the movie] is so dedicated to lionization and so declamatory in tone that it almost repels engagement," but praised "the gifted Devika Bhise" and that "the movie's costumes, though, are exquisite and its star swings a sword like a champ."

Film reviewers noted anachronisms in the scenario. For example, the character of Saleem Khan who advises Queen Victoria is based on Mohammed Abdul Karim, who did not become her advisor until 30 years later.
