= Myth of Kleopatra =

- Directed by: M Adeyapartha Rajan
- Written by: M Adeyapartha Rajan
- Produced by: Tom Alter; M Adeyapartha Rajan
- Starring: Tom Alter; Auroshikha Dey; Anil George
- Cinematography: Atul Dubey
- Release date: 2014
- Country: India
- Languages: English; Hindi

Myth of Kleopatra is a 2014 Hindi-English feature film by Adeyapartha Rajan. The film was premiered at International Film Festival of Kerala.

== Plot ==
The film is a collage of three stories that depicts the journey of three women who share the name Kleopatra and their lives come into a shocking twist of fate replete with crime, compassion and punishment.

== Film festivals ==
- Premiered at International Film Festival of Kerala 2015
- Ladakh International Film Festival 2015
