= Lisa Matassa =

American singer-songwriter

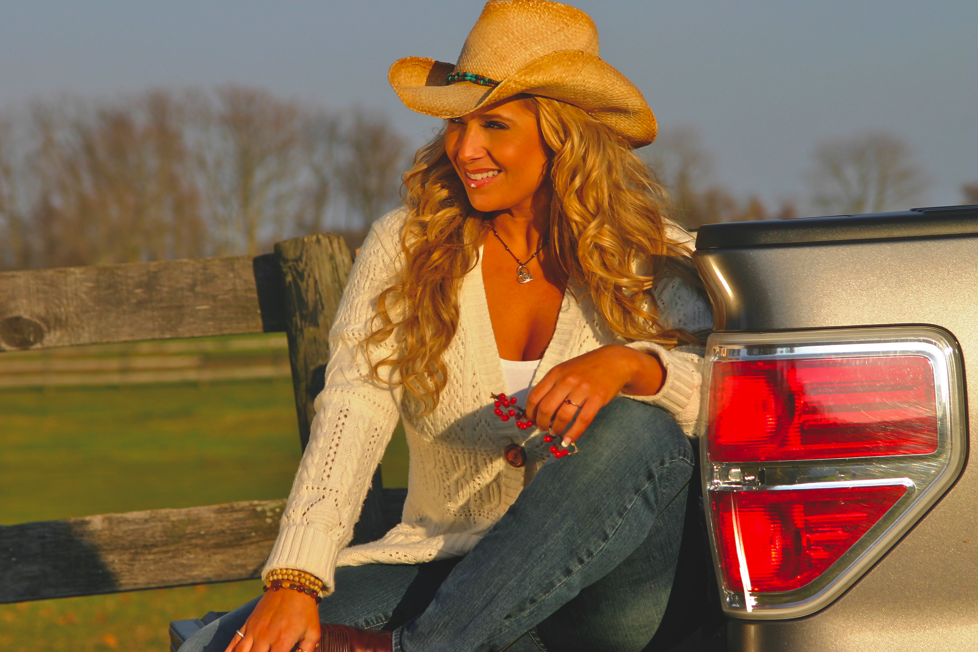
- Matassa in 2011

Background information
- Also known as: Lysa Lynn
- Origin: Long Island, New York, U.S.
- Genres: Country, rock
- Occupation: Singer-songwriter
- Instrument: Vocals
- Years active: 1987–1988; 2010–present
- Labels: CPR Music Group; It Is What It Is Records; Emergency Records
- Website: www.LisaMatassa.com

Lisa Matassa is an American country singer and singer-songwriter. In the 1980s she had two pop hits reach the top ten on the Dance Music Charts, including 1987's "I've Got the Hots for You" and 1988's "Rock Me Baby", both credited to Lysa Lynn. She released a debut country EP on March 31, 2011 titled Me Time.

== Early life ==
Lisa Matassa was born and initially raised on Long Island, New York. She comes from a musical family; her mother used to sing in a doo-wop group, and her grandmother was an opera singer. As a child she often listened to artists such as Loretta Lynn and Elvis Presley. When Matassa was seven years old her family moved to Fort Lauderdale, Florida, where they remained for eight years. Matassa began studying opera with an alumna of the Metropolitan Opera when she was about nine, continuing until age 14, when she branched into pop and rock. Her family moved back to Franklin Square, New York when she was in tenth grade.

== Career ==
=== Early career ===
In 1987, recently out of high school, Matassa was overheard by a dance producer while she was performing with a local Long Island band named Recovery. She promptly signed a recording contract with the independent label Emergency Records under the stage name Lysa Lynn. The label specialized in producing dance-pop, such as recording artist Shannon's dance anthem "Let the Music Play."

Matassa recorded two hit singles, 1987's "I've Got the Hots for You" and 1988's "Rock Me Baby", both of which gained national and international airplay and reached the top ten on the Dance Music Charts. She performed numerous shows alongside artists such as Taylor Dayne, Brenda K. Starr, Judy Torres, and TKA among others. Her song "Stay With Me Tonight" was in the 1988 Carrie Fisher movie She's Back.

Matassa soon gained an inclination to record songs she had written herself, with a more rock edge, but Emergency Records dissolved several months after the release of her last single.

In 1992, Matassa married and settled down to raise a family in Plainview, Long Island. She continued to perform in Long Island and Manhattan clubs, and also did commercial voice-over work. During this time of focusing on her family life, Matassa also was the band leader of a successful club band for 20 years.

=== Production ===
In 2010, Matassa headed to Nashville to write and record Me Time, a new EP of country music. Other participants in the album's creation were Bobby Graziose, producer Joey Sykes and songwriting collaborations with country music writer Don Rollins, songwriter Jody Gray, and producer Tony Bruno. The EP is a stylistic blend of Southern Rock, New Country, and Pop.

=== Release ===
The EP was released on It Is What It Is Records on March 31, 2011. Nine North Records from Nashville has handled a portion of the promotion. The release concert took place on March 31, with her supporting band consisting of Tony Bruno, Greg Smith, Jules Radino, Joey Sykes, Colin Smith, Mike Dimeo, Bobby Guy Graziose, and Simi Stone.

Matassa has been a Featured Artist on ReverbNation.com, after ReverbNation co-founder Lou Plaia read her story in the Plainview Old Bethpage Herald.

Her music has received airplay on WJVC 96.1 FM, Long Island's local country station. She has been interviewed on Fox News in California and New York, 1010 WINS, and a number of other radio stations. Matassa performed the national anthem and was the opening act for Freedomfest 2011 on July 2, 2011, the first country music festival to be held at Ducks Stadium on Long Island. "Me Time", the title track from her EP, has been formally added into rotations on more than a dozen radio station play lists. In Spring of 2011 Matassa embarked on a north east radio promotion tour and will follow it up with a national radio promotion tour through summer of 2011.

In 2016, Matassa released "Make America Great Again".

== Style ==
Matassa has dubbed her style of music "Long Island Country", which she describes as a combination of New York rock and roll mixed with new country. On March 31, 2011, Nassau County Executive Ed Mangano awarded Matassa a citation as Long Island's first country music recording artist, and the pioneer of the genre Long Island Country genre. Beyond traditional country influences she has stated she is influenced by musicians such as Bonnie Raitt, Barbra Streisand, Linda Ronstadt, Patsy Cline, Loretta Lynn, Elvis, The Beatles, Heart, and Lynyrd Skynyrd.

== Personal life ==
Matassa continues to live in Plainview, Long Island with her husband. In addition to volunteering at her local church, she volunteers and supports the Last Hope Animal Shelter, the Breath Believe Foundation for cystic fibrosis, and the Sidewalk Angels Foundation, a non-profit that helps fund research for autism.

== Discography ==
=== Singles ===
- "I've Got the Hots for You" (1987)
- "Rock Me Baby" (1988)
- "Me Time" (2011)
- "The Christmas Song" (2011)
- "Wouldn't You Like to Know" (2012)
- "Somebody's Baby" (2012)
- "I Won't Ask" (2013)
- "Make America Great Again" (2016)

=== Studio albums ===
- Me Time EP (2011)
- Sunrise Highway LP (2012)
- Somebody's Baby EP (2012)
- Why I'm Here – Legendary Duets (2015)

=== Music videos ===
Year	Video	Director
2011	"I Don't Feel Anything"	LMA Productions
2011	"The Christmas Song"	Traci Goudie
2012	"Me Time"	Traci Goudie
2012	"Wouldn't You Like to Know"	Traci Goudie
2012	"I Will Always Love You"	Traci Goudie
2012	"Somebody's Baby"	Traci Goudie
2013	"I Won't Ask"	Traci Goudie
