= Jhalkaribai =

Indian soldier and historical figure

Jhalkari Bai
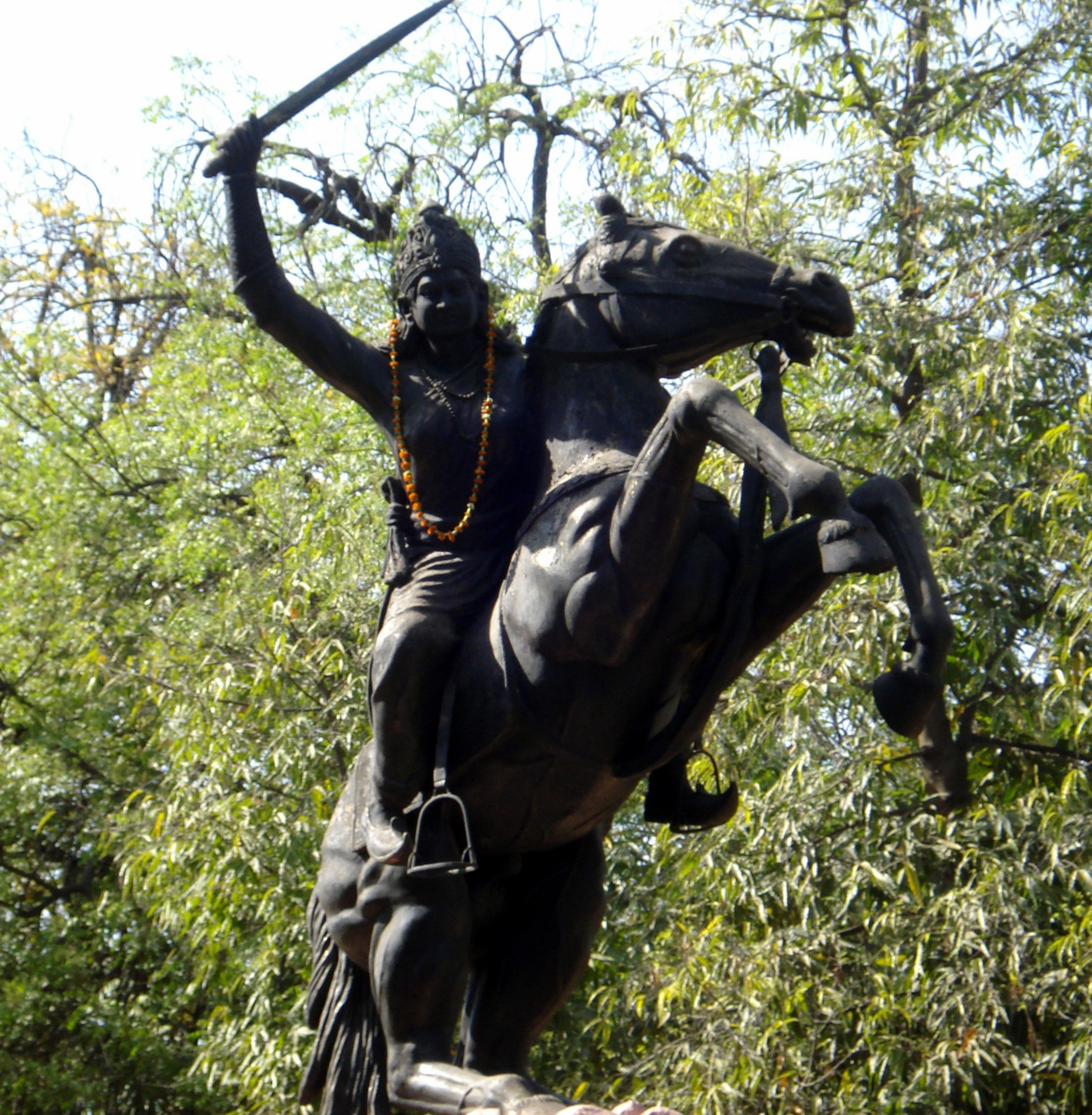
- Statue of Jhalkaribai in Gwalior
- Born: 22 November 1830; Jhansi state Bundelkhand
- Died: April 4, 1858 (aged 27); Jhansi, Jhansi state
- Cause of death: Battle of Jhansi
- Occupation: Warrior/Army personnel
- Known for: Being the most prominent advisor to Rani Lakshmibai
- Movement: Indian Rebellion of 1857
- Spouse: Puran Singh (an artilleryman from the artillery unit of Rani Lakshmibai)
- Parents: Sadowar Singh (father); Jamuna Devi (mother)
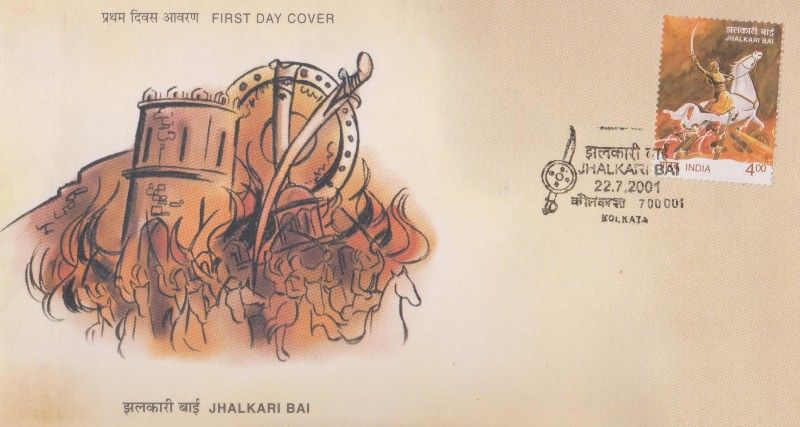
- Honours: Jhalkari Bai Postal Stamp

Jhalkaribai (22 November 1830 – 4 April 1858) was a legendary woman soldier who is said to have played an important role in the Indian Rebellion of 1857. As per folk narrative, she served in the women's army of Rani Lakshmibai of Jhansi. She eventually rose to a position of a prominent advisor to the queen, Rani of Jhansi. At the height of the Siege of Jhansi, she disguised herself as the queen and fought on her behalf, on the front, allowing the queen to escape safely out of the fort. She is however not mentioned in most contemporary records, with first written account of her coming from the 1907 Marathi language work Majha Pravas by Vishnu Rao Godse where he she is only mentioned as Lakshmibai's maid.

== Personal life ==
Jhalkaribai was born to Sadova Singh, a farmer, and his wife Jamunadevi on 22 November 1830 in Bhojla village, near Jhansi. It has been claimed that in her youth she stood her ground when attacked by a tiger and killed it with an axe. She reportedly once killed a leopard in the forest with a stick she used to herd cattle.

Jhalkaribai bore an uncanny resemblance to Laxmibai and because of this she was inducted into the women's regiment of the Jhansi army.

== Military service ==
In the queen's army, she quickly rose in the ranks and began commanding her own army. During the Rebellion of 1857, General Hugh Rose attacked Jhansi with a large army. The queen faced the army with 14,000 of her troops. She waited for relief from Peshwa Nana Sahib's army camping at Kalpi that did not come because Tantia Tope had already been defeated by General Rose. Meanwhile, Dulhaji, in charge of one of the gates of the fort, had made a pact with the assailants and opened the doors of Jhansi for the British forces. When the British rushed the fort, Laxmibai, on advice of her courtier, escaped through Bhanderi gate with her son and attendants to Kalpi. Upon hearing of Laxmibai's escape, Jhalkaribai set out for General Rose's camp in disguise and declared herself to be the queen. This led to a confusion that continued for a whole day and gave the Rani's army renewed advantage.

In addition, she was a close confidante and advisor to the queen playing a key role in the analysis of the battle, alongside Laxmibai.

== Legacy ==
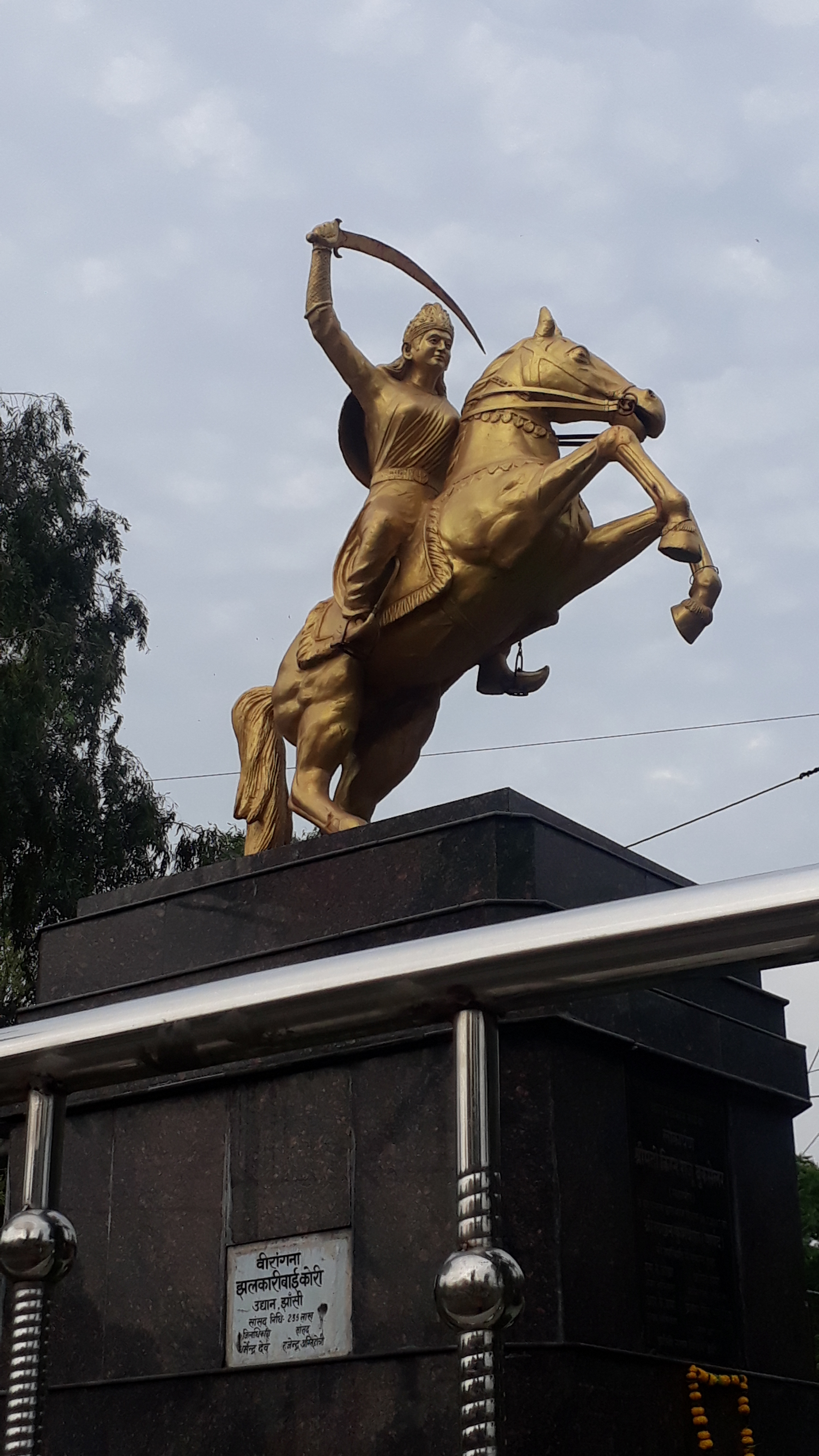
Statue of Jhalkaribai in Jhansi

The death anniversary of Jhalkaribai is celebrated as Shahid Diwas (Martyr Day) by various Koli/Kori organizations. The movement to establish Bundelkhand as a separate state has also used the legend of Jhalkaribai to create the Bundeli identity. The Government of India's Post and Telegraph department has issued a postal stamp depicting Jhalkaribai.

The Archaeological Survey of India is setting up a museum at Panch Mahal, a five-storey building located inside the Jhansi Fort in remembrance of Jhalkaribai.

She is referred to in the novel Jhansi ki Rani written in 1951 by B. L. Varma, who created a subplot in his novel about Jhalkaribai. He addressed Jhalkaribai as Korin and an extraordinary soldier in Laxmibai's army. Ram Chandra Heran Bundeli novel Maati, published in the same year, depicted her as "chivalrous and a valiant martyr". The first biography of Jhalkaribai was written in 1964 by Bhawani Shankar Visharad, with the help of Varma's novel and his research from the oral narratives of Kori communities living in the vicinity of Jhansi.

Writers narrating the story of Jhalkaribai. Efforts have been made to place Jhalkaribai at an equal footing of Laxmibai. Since the 1990s, the story of Jhalkaribai has begun to model a fierce form of Koli womanhood, has acquired a political dimension, and her image is being reconstructed with the demands of social situation.

President Ramnath Kovind unveiled the statue of Jhalkari Bai at Guru Tegh Bahadur Complex in Bhopal on 10 November 2017.

=== Depiction in film ===
Manikarnika (2019), a Hindi film starring Ankita Lokhande as Jhalkaribai has been made.

Auroshikha Dey played Jhalkaribai in the British period drama The Warrior Queen of Jhansi (2019).

== See also ==
- Tanaji Malusare
- Rooplo Kolhi
- Uda Devi

== Sources ==
- Sarala, Srikrishna (1999). Indian Revolutionaries: a comprehensive study, 1757–1961. Vol. I. Prabhat Prakashan. ISBN 978-81-87100-16-4.
- Narayan, Badri (2006). Women Heroes and Dalit Assertion in North India: culture, identity and politics. Sage. ISBN 978-0-7619-3537-7.
- Varma, Vrindavanlala; Sahaya, Amita (2001). Lakshmi Bai, the rani of Jhansi. Prabhat Prakashan. ISBN 978-81-87100-54-6.
- Sauquet, Michel (2004). L'idiot du village mondial: Les citoyens de la planète face à l'explosion des outils de communication : subir ou maîtriser (in French). ECLM. ISBN 978-2-84377-094-4.
- Majumdar, RC; Raychaudhuri, HC; Datta, Kalikinkar (1990). An Advanced History of India. MacMillan India Limited. ISBN 0-333-90298-X.
- Thakur, Harinarayan (2009). Dalit Sahitya Ka Samajshastra (in Hindi). Bhartiya Jnanpith. ISBN 978-81-263-1734-9.
- "Bhojla ki beti" Bundeli mahakavya (Dalchand Anuragi, Rajendra Nagar, ORAI) (2010)
