= Alto (film) =

- Theatrical release poster
- Directed by: Mikki del Monico
- Written by: Mikki del Monico
- Produced by: Toni D'Antonio
- Starring: Diana DeGarmo; Natalie Knepp; David Valcin; Ward Horton; Lin Tucci; Jake Robards; Billy Wirth; Annabella Sciorra
- Cinematography: Valentina Caniglia
- Edited by: Mikki del Monico
- Music by: Thom Rotella
- Production company: Shake the Tree Productions
- Distributed by: Cinema Libre Studio
- Release dates: April 26, 2015 (Miami Gay & Lesbian Film Festival); August 1, 2015 (United States)
- Running time: 101 minutes
- Country: United States
- Language: English

Alto is a 2015 American romantic comedy crime film written and directed by Mikki del Monico. It stars Diana DeGarmo and Natalie Knepp as two Italian-American women who develop an unlikely friendship considering one is a mob boss's daughter and the other is a singer in a band. Nicolette develops feelings for Frankie but all Frankie can do is run away from her emotions. The film is light-hearted while showing the struggles of coming out to the family.

== Plot ==
Frankie is an Italian American pursuing a career as a singer-songwriter with her band while balancing her relationship with a man whose dream is to start a frozen food label. Frankie's life becomes interesting when she discovers a dead body in her rental car and turns it over to the police. Frankie lives with her sister Heather who is obsessed with the mob lifestyle. Heather convinces Frankie to go with her to the real-life mob boss's funeral. At the funeral Frankie meets Nicolette, a charming, confident, beautiful woman who, unbeknownst to Frankie, is the new mob boss's daughter. Heather invites Nicolette to come to watch Frankie perform. Nicolette wants to help Frankie and her band make it big by getting her to perform on the hit TV show Mob Hit. Nicolette and Frankie begin to spend more time together. Nicolette is into Frankie but Frankie is trying to process what kind of feelings she has for Nicolette, while being engaged to her longtime boyfriend. Meanwhile, a whole plot is slowly being uncovered on who tried to take out Nicolette's father and suspicions turn toward Frankie because she unknowingly knows people who are in the mob. Eventually it is revealed that Frankie's own father is a bookmaker for the mob boss, leaving Frankie feeling betrayed. However, Frankie is cleared of her association, and Nicolette and Frankie's romance is noticed by their families and Frankie's fiancé. At the end of the movie Frankie calls off her engagement to pursue her feelings for Nicolette and both women slowly try to gain the support of their parents.

== Cast ==
- Diana DeGarmo as Frankie Del Vecchio
- Natalie Knepp as Nicolette Bellafusco
- David Valcin as Mike Del Vecchio
- Ward Horton as FBI Agent Laughlin
- Lin Tucci as Mrs. Lina Cappelletti
- Jake Robards as Tony Cappelletti
- Billy Wirth as Caesar Bellafusco
- Annabella Sciorra as Sofia Del Vecchio

== Awards ==
- Best First-Time Director, Downtown Film Festival Los Angeles 2015
- Audience Favorite Feature, New York VisionFest 2015
- Production Design, New York VisionFest 2015
- Best Women's Feature, North Carolina Gay and Lesbian Film Festival 2015

== Film festivals ==
- Miami Gay & Lesbian Film Festival – April 26, 2015
- Vision Fest – May 15, 2015
- Hoboken International Film Festival – May 30, 2015
- San Francisco International LGBT Film Festival – June 23, 2015
