= Impossible Monsters (film) =

American film

- Theatrical poster
- Directed by: Nathan Catucci
- Written by: Nathan Catucci
- Produced by: Dorottya Mathe; Jonathan Burkhart; Nathan Catucci
- Starring: Santino Fontana; Natalie Knepp; Devika Bhise; Dónall Ó Héalaí; Chris Henry Coffey; Geoffrey Owens; Mercer Boffey; Dennis Boutsikaris; Laila Robins
- Cinematography: Behnood Dadfar
- Edited by: Nathan Catucci; Nahuel Attar
- Music by: Michael MacAllister
- Distributed by: Gravitas Ventures
- Release dates: March 9, 2019 (Cinequest); February 14, 2020 (U.S.)
- Running time: 83 minutes
- Country: United States
- Language: English

Impossible Monsters is a 2019 American psychological thriller film written and directed by Nathan Catucci and starring Santino Fontana, Natalie Knepp, Devika Bhise and Dónall Ó Héalaí. The film had its world premiere at the Cinequest Film Festival on March 9, 2019, and was released in selected theaters on February 14, 2020.

== Plot ==
Psychology professor Rich Freeman studies sleep phenomena at a university in New York. After losing a prestigious award to his academic rival, Freeman is pressured by the university dean to push forward a study on dreams, nightmares and sleep paralysis. The reward for conducting the study is a large grant being offered by a pharmaceutical company.

The study involves a tortured artist named Otis, a sex worker named Jo, and a third participant named Leigh – all of whom are haunted by horrific nightmares and sleep paralysis. As the study progresses, Freeman becomes romantically involved with Leigh.

After one of the participants in the study is murdered, an investigation is launched into the mysterious circumstances of the death, as the distinction between reality and dreams becomes increasingly blurred for those involved.

== Cast ==
- Santino Fontana as Dr. Rich Freeman
- Natalie Knepp as Leigh
- Devika Bhise as Jo
- Dónall Ó Héalaí as Otis
- Chris Henry Coffey as Charlie
- Geoffrey Owens as Jacobs
- Mercer Boffey as Costello
- Dennis Boutsikaris as Steven
- Laila Robins as Dean Gaslow

== Production ==
The title of the film is taken from a quote by the Spanish painter Francisco Goya. The film was the debut feature of Nathan Catucci, who wrote and directed the film. Catucci won the Panavision New Filmmaker grant, which allowed him to begin production on the film. He has stated that the film was inspired by his experience with sleep paralysis as a teenager, saying:

It wasn’t until college that I discovered what sleep paralysis was, and began exploring the science of dreams through art, mainly Henry Fuseli’s painting “The Nightmare” and Francisco de Goya’s etching “The Sleep of Reason.” This would eventually become the seed for “Impossible Monsters".

The film was shot over the course of 18 days at 35 locations in New York City, with some scenes shot in New Jersey and the Hudson Valley. Parts of the film take place at an unspecified university where Dr. Freeman works, and were shot on location at City College of New York. Original art for the film was produced by Gwen A.P., a Wisconsin-based artist.

== Release ==
Impossible Monsters premiered at the Cinequest Film Festival on March 9, 2019. The film was subsequently screened at the New York Latino Film Festival, the New Jersey International Film Festival, and the Arizona Underground Film Festival. The film had its UK premiere at Cine-Excess on November 7, 2019. On January 16, 2020, it was announced that Gravitas Ventures had acquired exclusive distribution rights to the film, which was to be released worldwide on Vimeo, and on various video on demand platforms in North America, the UK and Australia on March 3, 2020. The film had a limited theatrical release in New York and Los Angeles on February 14, 2020.

== Reception ==
Impossible Monsters has an average score of 50% on Rotten Tomatoes, and received mixed reviews from critics. Frank Scheck of The Hollywood Reporter praised the film's cast, use of practical effects and visual atmosphere, while criticizing its final act for losing focus. He wrote that "it's an admirably ambitious and accomplished debut for its tyro filmmaker who should easily move on to bigger things."

Despite praising the visual aesthetic of the film, Michael Rechtshaffen of Los Angeles Times was more critical, writing that "Ultimately, just as the events tread a fine line between fantasy and reality, so does the film teeter precipitously between promise and pretense."

Dylan Andresen of Film Threat gave the film a 7 out of 10 score, writing that "Ultimately Impossible Monsters is a perfectly adequate film with good production values and quite a few engaging twists and turns. If you are interested in the psychology of dreams and nightmares, or the thrill of a murder mystery, then this film is worth a watch."

== Accolades ==
Award	Category	Result
New Jersey International Festival	Narrative Feature	Won (Honorable Mention)
New Jersey International Festival	Best Feature Film	Won (Honorable Mention)
Arizona Underground Film Festival	Best Narrative Feature	Won
