= Tikdam =

- Official release poster
- Directed by: Vivek Anchalia
- Written by: Pankaj Nihalani; Vivek Anchalia
- Story by: Animesh Verma
- Produced by: Jyoti Deshpande; Parth Gajjar; Poonam Shroff; Savio Shenoy; Shweta Sharma Anchalia
- Starring: Amit Sial; Arisht Jain; Aarohi Saud; Divyansh Dwivedi; Nayan Bhatt
- Cinematography: Parth Sayani
- Edited by: Satya Sharma
- Music by: Daniel B. George
- Production company: Jio Studios
- Distributed by: JioCinema
- Release date: 23 August 2024
- Running time: 118 minutes
- Country: India
- Language: Hindi

Tikdam (transl. Trickeries) is a 2024 Indian Hindi-language film directed by Vivek Anchalia. Produced by Jio Studios, it stars Amit Sial, Arisht Jain, Aarohi Saud, Divyansh Dwivedi and Nayan Bhatt.

== Cast ==
- Amit Sial as Prakash
- Divyansh Dwivedi as Bhanu
- Aarohi Saud as Cheeni
- Arisht Jain as Samay
- Nayan Bhatt as Daadi
- Ajit Sarwotam Kelkar as Dadu
- Jeniffer Piccinato as Rose

== Production ==
The film was announced on JioCinema. The filming took place in Ramnagar, Nainital, Uttarakhand.

== Release ==
The film was screened at the Indian Film Festival of Houston on 24 February, 2023. It premiered on JioCinema on 23 August 2024.

== Music ==
Tikdam

Soundtrack album by Daniel B. George
- Released: August 10, 2024
- Genre: Feature film soundtrack
- Length: 19:05
- Language: Hindi
- Label: Times Music

Track listing
No.	Title	Singer(s)	Length
1.	"Zindagi Hai Yeh"	Swanand Kirkire	01:12
2.	"Teen Tigada"	Brijesh Shandilya	03:05
3.	"Gubbare"	Mohit Chauhan	02:45
4.	"Jhundh"	Brijesh Shandilya	02:46
5.	"Jee Na Sake Hum Jiske Bina"	Mohit Chauhan	03:14
6.	"Lori"	Ujjwal Kashyap	03:57
7.	"Gubbare (Slow Version)"	Mohit Chauhan	02:06
Total length:			19:05

== Reception ==
Zinia Bandyopadhyay of India Today awarded the film 3.5/5 stars. Mimansa Shekhar of Times Now rated the film 3.5 out of 5 stars. Abhishek Srivastava of The Times of India gave the film 4/5 stars.
