= Hodson Trust Scholarship =

Four-year scholarship at Johns Hopkins University

The Hodson Trust Scholarship is the most prestigious four-year merit-based scholarship at Johns Hopkins University. It is offered to roughly 20 incoming freshmen each year from a pool of over 45,000 applicants.

The scholarship is given for "academic and personal achievement, leadership, and contribution" and provides $42,000 per year for four years if the recipient keeps a GPA of 3.0 or above for a total award of $168,000. Students who receive the scholarship are automatically chosen from the entire applicant pool – no outside application is needed.

The scholarship is funded by the Hodson Trust, which also heavily donates to Johns Hopkins University and funds scholarships for other Maryland schools. The Hodson Trust has given the university nearly $90 million since 1958.

Describing the value of the Trust, Bill Conley, the Dean of Enrollment and Services for Johns Hopkins University, has said:

“The Hodson Trust enables us to look at the cream of admitted students and encourage their enrollment. Our pool of candidates is as strong as any pool at any school. These scholarships give us an opportunity to shape the class, and are a tremendous inducement for the students to choose Hopkins...The fact of the matter is that we have a very low scholarship endowment relative to our peers, and what scholarship dollars we have are a critical tool in the recruitment and retention of students.”
