= Geoffrey Owens =

American actor

- Born: Geoffrey Louis Owens; March 18, 1961 (age 65); New York City, New York, U.S.
- Education: Yale University
- Occupation: Actor
- Years active: 1985–present
- Spouse: Josette Owens (m. 1995)
- Children: 2
- Parent(s): Major Owens; Ethel Werfel
- Website: geoffreyowens.com

Geoffrey Louis Owens (born March 18, 1961) is an American actor known for his role as Elvin Tibideaux on The Cosby Show (1985–1992). He is the son of the United States Congressman Major Owens.

== Early life and education ==
Owens was born in Brooklyn, New York, to Ethel (née Werfel), a music and literature teacher, and Major Owens, a librarian who later went on to serve in the New York State Senate and the United States House of Representatives. He has two brothers and two half-siblings from his father's second marriage. Owens attended the High School of Performing Arts for a year and graduated cum laude from Yale University in 1983.

== Career ==
One of Owens's earliest roles was in an Arcata High School theater performance where he played the title role in a performance of Peter Pan. This initial outing was what galvanized him to become an actor later in life.

In 1985, Owens made his television debut on the second season of the NBC sitcom The Cosby Show as Sondra Huxtable's boyfriend Elvin Tibideaux. Tibideaux married Sondra and became a regular character in 1987 and appeared on the series until it ended in 1992. In 1994, he made his film debut as Lou in Ron Howard's film The Paper.

Starting in 2007, Owens appeared as himself on the FX sitcom It's Always Sunny in Philadelphia. In the season 3 episode "The Gang Gets Invincible" he appears at the Philadelphia Eagles' public tryouts as an actor pretending to be Donovan McNabb doing a plug for McDonald's but the gang recognize him as "that guy from The Cosby Show" who played "Sondra's husband ... Alvin [sic]". In the season 7 episode "Frank's Pretty Woman" he plays the same character, this time pretending to be Tiger Woods. Dee, however, recognizes him and calls him out as the guy who pretended to be McNabb at the Eagles' tryouts. He then admits he is not Tiger Woods but then claims to be actor Don Cheadle. That same year, he guest-starred as Eddie's father in the That's So Raven episode "The Way We Were", and appeared on the season premiere of NBC's Las Vegas. In the second episode of Season 15, "The Gang Makes Lethal Weapon 7", he appears as the same character, but is given the role to play as Roger Murtaugh in the gang’s Lethal Weapon 7 movie.

In 2009, he appeared alongside Paul Campbell, Andy Griffith, Doris Roberts, Liz Sheridan, Marla Sokoloff and Juliette Jeffers in the romantic comedy Play The Game. In 2010, he appeared on ABC Family's The Secret Life of the American Teenager as a court-appointed mediator. He also appeared on the ABC show FlashForward in the episode "The Garden of Forking Paths", playing a researcher.

In 2011, Owens portrayed the role of Casca at the Shakespeare Theatre Company in its Free-For-All production of Julius Caesar. In 2015, he acted in an episode of the NBC drama series The Slap. In 2017, he portrayed an assistant dean on the FOX drama series Lucifer, in an episode entitled "Deceptive Little Parasite".

In 2018, he appeared as a lawyer on season 6 episode 1 of Elementary. That same year, photos of Owens working in a Trader Joe's were published by The Daily Mail, which many characterized as "job shaming." Owens agreed with the "job shaming" characterization, eventually quitting due to the unwanted attention. The story led producer Tyler Perry to offer Owens a ten-episode role in The Haves and the Have Nots. Owens also booked a guest-starring role on NCIS: New Orleans and supporting roles in the films Fatale (2020) and Hide and Seek (2021). In 2024, Owens revealed ongoing career and financial challenges.

In 2019, he starred in the film Impossible Monsters, where he played a police detective. "I’m usually cast as dads, lawyers, doctors, teachers, and so to play a detective it was really fun," he said. In 2020, he played a supporting role in Power Book II: Ghost. In 2025, Owens played the role of Daryl in the Netflix holiday movie A Merry Little Ex-Mas.

=== Teaching ===
Owens is the founder and artistic director of The Brooklyn Shakespeare Company. He has taught acting and Shakespeare at Columbia University, Yale, Stella Adler Studio of Acting, the Adult School of Montclair and Pace University. In addition to developing his own private Shakespeare workshop, he has been a guest teacher at universities, theaters, studios, and middle and high schools in the New York metropolitan area. He has also served as a judge for the National Shakespeare Competition semi-finals at Lincoln Center for at least 25 years.

== Personal life ==
In 1995, Owens married his wife, Josette. Together they have one son.

== Filmography ==
=== Film ===
Year	Title	Role	Notes
1994	The Paper	Lou	
2009	Play the Game	Rob Marcus	
2011	Wilde Salomé	Tigellinus	
2014	Romeo and Juliet	Prince Escalus	
2016	Youth in Oregon	Dr. Roma	
2019	Impossible Monsters	Jacobs	
2020	Fatale	Bill Cranepool	
2021	Hide and Seek	Lyle	
2022	Somewhere in Queens	Scotty	
2022	Susie Searches	President Andrews	
2023	Ezra	Robert Segal	
2025	Nonnas	Phil	
2025	A Merry Little Ex-Mas	Daryl	

=== Television ===
Year	Title	Role	Notes
1985–92	The Cosby Show	Elvin Tibideaux	Recurring Cast: Season 2-3, Main Cast: Season 4-8
1990	ABC Afterschool Special	Mr. Singer	Episode: "Stood Up!"
1997	Built to Last	Robert Watkins	Main Cast
1999	Law & Order	Langer	Episode: "Refuge: Part 2"
2002	Law & Order: Special Victims Unit	Dr. Constantino	Episode: "Dolls"
2007	That's So Raven	Michael Thomas	Episode: "The Way They Were"
2007	The Wedding Bells	Dr. Harris	Episode: "The Most Beautiful Girl"
2007	Boston Legal	Dr. Mitch Morris	Episode: "Beauty and the Beast"
2007	Las Vegas	Dr. Eric Haber	Episode: "Shrink Rap"
2007	The Journeyman	Matthew Tarbell	Episode: "The Year of the Rabbit"
2007–21	It's Always Sunny in Philadelphia	Various Roles	Guest Cast: Season 3 & 7 & 15
2008	Medium	Unemployment Evaluator	Recurring Cast: Season 4
2008	I Didn't Know I Was Pregnant	Hospital Staff	Episode: "Special #1"
2008	Without a Trace	Jay Costas	Episode: "Live to Regret"
2010	FlashForward	Dr. Julian Ebbing	Episode: "The Garden of Forking Paths"
2010–11	The Secret Life of the American Teenager	Mediator/Judge	Guest Cast: Season 2-3
2014	The Leftovers	Kind Man	Episode: "The Prodigal Son Returns"
2014	The Affair	Victor	Episode: "Episode #1.10"
2015	The Slap	Dr. Fletcher	Episode: "Richie"
2015	Deadbeat	Arthur	Episode: "Table for Sue"
2016	Divorce	Gerald	Recurring Cast: Season 1
2017	Blue Bloods	Sergeant Weller	Episode: "Love Lost"
2017	Lucifer	Assistant Dean	Episode: "Deceptive Little Parasite"
2017	The Blacklist	Dresner	Episode: "The Endling (No. 44)"
2018	Elementary	Vernon Fisk	Episode: "An Infinite Capacity for Taking Pains"
2018	NCIS: New Orleans	Commander Calvin Atkins	Episode: "Pound of Flesh"
2019	Billions	Abington	Episode: "Maximum Recreational Depth"
2019	On Becoming a God in Central Florida	Pastor Steve	Recurring Cast
2020	Mythic Quest: Raven's Banquet	Tom	Episode: "A Dark Quiet Death"
2020	Power	Daniel Warren	Recurring Cast: Season 6
2020	Bless This Mess	Pastor Paul	Recurring Cast: Season 2
2020–21	The Haves and the Have Nots	Conley	Recurring Cast: Season 7-8
2020–22	Power Book II: Ghost	Daniel Warren	Guest: Season 1, Recurring Cast: Season 2
2021	That Damn Michael Che	Thurgood Carver	Recurring Cast: Season 1
2021	The Good Fight	Daniel	Recurring Cast: Season 5
2022	New Amsterdam	Chris/Santa	Episode: "Talkin' Bout a Revolution"
2022	The Rookie	Graham Scott	Episode: "Coding"
2022	Bull	Judge Westlake	Episode: "Opening Up"
2022–23	All Rise	Carl Brewer	Recurring Cast: Season 3
2024	Ghosts	Gene	Episode: “The Polterguest”
2024	Poppa's House	J. J. Fulton	Recurring Cast
2024	QueenDom PI	Bruno	Episode: "Do You Speak Bulgarian?"
2025	The Night Agent	Patrick Knox	Episode: "A Good Agent"
2026	The Pitt	Dr. Clay Barrett	Episode: "7:00 P.M."
2026	Abbott Elementary	Interim Superintendent Derek Collins	Episode: "Miami"
