= Me Time =

EP by Lisa Matassa
- Released: May 31, 2011
- Recorded: 2010–2011
- Genre: Country, rock, pop
- Label: It Is What It Is Records
- Producer: Bobby Graziose

Me Time is the debut EP by country singer Lisa Matassa, released on March 31, 2011.

== Production ==
Much of the EP was originally composed and written in Nashville at Jim "Moose" Brown's studio, though some of the final tracks were recorded at Richi Cannata's Cove City Sound Studios in Glen Cove, New York.

Participants in the album's creation were two-time Grammy nominee Bobby Graziose, who served as co-executive producer, and producer Tony Bruno, who also works with Rihanna and Enrique Iglesias. Producer Joey Sykes, who previously worked for bands such as Third Eye Blind, also collaborated on the project. Country songwriter Don Rollins and Jody Gray assisted as co-writers along with Matassa on one of the tracks. The EP is a stylistic blend of Rock, New Country, and Pop.

=== Release ===
The EP was released on It Is What It Is Records on March 31, 2011. Nine North Records from Nashville has handled a portion of the promotion. The EP release concert took place on March 31, with Matassa's supporting band including Tony Bruno, Greg Smith, Jules Radino, Joey Sykes, Colin Smith, Mike Dimeo, Bobby Guy Graziose, and Simi Stone.

== Track listing ==
1. "I Don't Feel Anything" - 3:18
2. "Wouldn't You Like to Know" - 3:32
3. "Me Time" - 3:00
4. "Kiss Me Quiet" - 3:50
5. "Transparent" - 3:36

== Personnel ==
- Lisa Matassa - Vocals, Co-Writer
- Bobby Graziose - Executive Producer
- Tony Bruno - Co-Writer / Producer
- Joey Sykes - Co-Writer / Producer
- Don Rollins - Co-Writer
- Jody Gray - Co-Writer
- Kelly Archer - Co-Writer
- Angie Broberg - Co-Writer
- Marjorie Maye - Co-Writer
- Shelly Peiken - Co-Writer
