= Gilson Snow =

American manufacturing company

- Type: Private
- Industry: Sporting goods
- Founded: 2013
- Headquarters: Winfield, Pennsylvania
- Key people: Nick Gilson, Founder and CEO, Austin Royer, COO
- Products: Snowboard equipment, apparel, accessories
- Website: www.gilsonsnow.com

Gilson Snow is an American snowboard and ski manufacturer based in Winfield, Pennsylvania. Gilson is the largest producer of custom snowboards and skis (custom artwork).

The company locally sources its hardwoods from sustainably harvested Pennsylvania poplar and states a commitment to responsible manufacturing.

== History ==
Gilson Snow was founded in 2013 out of the classroom by Nick Gilson (CEO) and Austin Royer (COO) in Nashville, Tennessee. Both Gilson and Royer were working as middle school science teachers, (Gilson through Teach For America) when they created year-long "curiosity projects" with their students. Gilson and Royer led an example project, out of which the first Gilson prototype was born. They relocated to a donkey and horse stable in Winfield, Pennsylvania later that year to build the company with limited resources. During this time, the early Gilson team lived in a cabin in the woods with no running water or electricity, hiking out each day to their makeshift factory in the stable. A year later, the growing team moved their headquarters down the road to the 17-acre farm that now holds their current manufacturing facility. This is also where they host their annual "Summer Snow Day", a free summer festival with music, food and beverage trucks, games, and snowboarding.

== Technology ==
Gilson skis and snowboards are known for their proprietary fluid dynamics-inspired design and their notable collaboration artwork.

Nick Gilson created the "soft edge" after observing that all objects moving through a fluid, e.g. boats and planes, are curved to maximize efficiency. Gilson grew up surfing and sailing which inspired his initial design. Their signature Pow Channel (raised central region) design was influenced by the advantages of the catamaran over mono-hulled boats, and reduces contact with the snow's surface, in turn reducing drag. The soft edge allows for a 'floating' feeling on top of the snow and minimizes hang-ups or edge-to-feature contact while the SuperFlex makes it easier to lock down presses and snap on or off rails.

== Notable custom builds and collaborations ==
- AC/DC
- Roman Atwood
- Major League Baseball
- Michael Bay
- Anheuser-Busch for Bud Light
- DogFish Head Brewery
- Keith Carlos
- Royal Australian Air Force
- Pink Floyd
- Joel Freeman
- Colorado Army National Guard - High-Altitude Army National Guard Aviation Training Site
- Hasbro
- National Hockey League
- Mario Lemieux
- Monopoly
- My Little Pony
- Phil Smage of Smage Brothers Riding Shows
- Rawlings (company)
- Sesame Street
- Superdry
- Transformers
- Tröegs
- Woodstock

== Awards and recognition ==
Gilson Snow has appeared in mainstream media including Outside, Bloomberg Businessweek, PBS, The Price Is Right, and NPR.

Ranked in Outside's Favorite Brands Born in America"

Ranked #1 Snowboard Brand by ReddyYeti

Young Entrepreneur of the Year, 2018 - Small Business Administration - Philadelphia & Eastern PA

Ranked in "The Best Boutique American-Made Skis and Snowboards" by Outside

Product Innovation Award for "the company that best demonstrates the commercialization of a unique, innovative, product that creatively and effectively meets a market need" from Ben Franklin Technology Partners

Innovation in New Product Development Award, 2015, from the Bucknell University Small Business Development Center (SBDC).
