= Swati Bhise =

Indian dancer

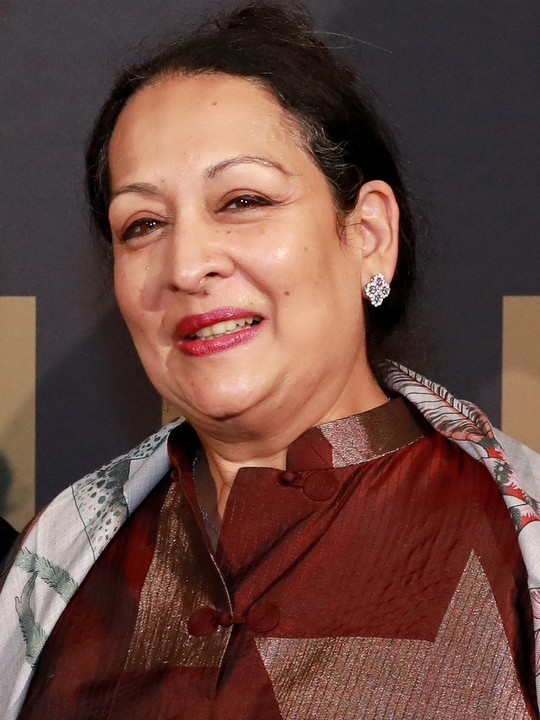
- Born: 21 October 1959 (age 66); Bombay, Bombay State, India
- Occupations: Bharatanatyam dancer, educator, producer, writer, director and promoter of the arts

Swati Bhise (née Gupte; born 21 October 1959) is an Indian Bharatanatyam dancer, choreographer, educator, producer, director, writer and promoter of the arts.

== Dance career ==
Swati is the first disciple of Sonal Mansingh, a Padma Vibhushan awardee. Since her debut performance at the Center of Indian Classical Dances in New Delhi, she has performed extensively around the world at venues including the National Centre for the Performing Arts (India), Lincoln Center, Asia Society, Symphony Space, Metropolitan Museum of Art, SPIC MACAY, and the House of Soviet Culture, among others. Some of her more notable performances have been for the 40th anniversary of the United Nations General assembly, the unveiling of Elsa Peretti and Paloma Picasso's new mesh designs for Tiffany & Co, and The Metropolitan Museum of Art for the opening of the South Asian Sculpture Wing. Swati also worked on the Indian choreography for Thomas Mann’s The Transposed Heads, adapted by Sidney Goldfarb and Julie Taymor. Swati was featured in a CBS documentary called 'Sacred Arts', as one of the foremost performers in her field.

== Educator ==
Swati served as an artist in residence at the Brearley School, New York City, from 1991 to 2006 and founded the non-profit Sanskriti Center for Indian arts in education for children and adolescents. She continues to teach for The Curriculum in Arts Program at Symphony Space and has been a Lincoln Center Institute repertory artist since 1996. She has also performed at hundreds of public and private schools, colleges, and universities across The United States including Columbia University, New York University, University of Texas at Austin, St. Mark's School of Texas, The Dalton School, The Brearley School, The Chapin School, Brooklyn College, and Wesleyan University. On March 13, 2023, Swati Bhise was one of the presenting speakers at UN's NGO CSW67 Forum on Right to an Inclusive, Safe and Secure Digital Existence for Women and Girls.

== Theater and film production ==
In 2012, Swati founded The Sadir Theater Festival, a three- day festival that takes place annually in Goa, India.

Swati also brought the UNESCO heritage art form Kunqu opera, one of the oldest styles of Chinese theatre, to India for the first time with performances at The National Centre for the Performing Arts, Mumbai, and at Siri Fort Auditorium in New Delhi.

In 2014, Swati founded a film production company called Cayenne Pepper Productions after serving as Executive Producer and Indian cultural consultant on The Man Who Knew Infinity, an Edward R Pressman film starring Dev Patel and Jeremy Irons. The film premiered at the Toronto International Film Festival in September 2015.

Swati directed a British / Indian self-written period drama set in 19th century India. The film The Warrior Queen of Jhansi released in theatres in November 2019 in the US, Canada and India.'
