= Baron Sandhurst =

Barony in the Peerage of the United Kingdom

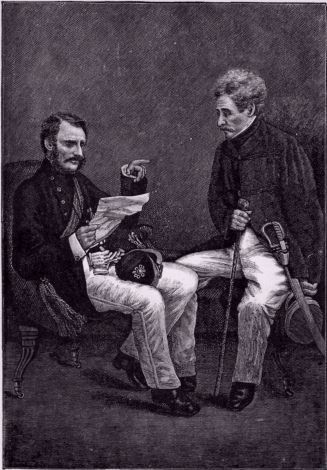
William Mansfield, 1st Viscount Sandhurst (left) with Colin Campbell, 1st Baron Clyde

Baron Sandhurst, of Sandhurst in the County of Berkshire, is a title in the Peerage of the United Kingdom. It was created on 28 March 1871 for the soldier Sir William Mansfield, Commander-in-Chief of India between 1865 and 1870 and Commander-in-Chief of Ireland between 1870 and 1875. He was the grandson of Sir James Mansfield, Solicitor-General and Chief Justice of the Common Pleas. Lord Sandhurst's eldest son, the second Baron, was a Liberal politician and also served as Governor of Bombay. On 1 January 1917 he was created Viscount Sandhurst, of Sandhurst in the County of Berkshire, in the Peerage of the United Kingdom. However, he had no surviving male issue and on his death in 1921 the viscountcy became extinct. He was succeeded in the barony by his younger brother, the third Baron. As of 2021 the title is held by the latter's great-grandson, the sixth Baron, who succeeded his father in 2002. He is a barrister and judge and was elected to a hereditary-peers' seat in the House of Lords in 2021.

== Barons Sandhurst (1871) ==
- William Rose Mansfield, 1st Baron Sandhurst (1819–1876)
- William Mansfield, 2nd Baron Sandhurst (1855–1921) (created Viscount Sandhurst in 1917)

== Viscounts Sandhurst (1917) ==
- William Mansfield, 1st Viscount Sandhurst, 2nd Baron Sandhurst (1855–1921)

== Barons Sandhurst (1871; Reverted) ==
- John William Mansfield, 3rd Baron Sandhurst (1857–1933)
- Ralph Sheldon Mansfield, 4th Baron Sandhurst (1892–1964)
- John Edward Terence Mansfield, 5th Baron Sandhurst (1920–2002)
- Guy Rhys John Mansfield, 6th Baron Sandhurst (b. 1949)

The heir apparent is the present holder's only son, Hon. Edward James Mansfield (b. 1982)

== Arms ==
Coat of arms of Baron Sandhurst
Crest Out of an Eastern crown Argent a gryphon’s head Sable beaked Or between two branches of laurel Proper. Escutcheon Argent on a chevron embattled Azure between three maunches Sable an Eastern crown Or on a chief engrailed of the third a lion of the fourth combatant with a tiger cowed Proper. Motto Steadfast

== See also ==
- Charles Edward Mansfield, army officer and diplomat, brother of the first baron
- Sir James Mansfield
- James Mansfield, cricketer and fourth son of the first baron
