= Margaret Mansfield, Baroness Sandhurst =

British suffragist and spiritualist

The Right Honourable The Lady Sandhurst
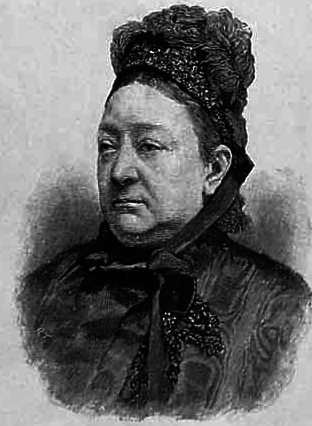
- Portrait of Margaret, Lady Sandhurst

Personal details
- Born: Margaret Fellowes ca. 1828 Norfolk
- Died: 7 January 1892 London
- Party: Liberal Party
- Spouse: William Mansfield, Baron Sandhurst
- Children: William Mansfield, Viscount Sandhurst (1855-1921); John William Mansfield, 3rd Baron Sandhurst (1857–1933); Henry William Mansfield (1860-1933); James William Mansfield (1862-1932); Margaret Louisa Mansfield (1864-1931)

Margaret Mansfield, Baroness Sandhurst (née Fellowes, ca. 1828 - 7 January 1892) was a suffragist who was one of the first women elected to a city council in the United Kingdom. She was also a prominent spiritualist.

== Personal life ==
Sandhurst was the youngest of the seven children of Robert Fellowes (1779–1869) of Shotesham Park, Norfolk, and his second wife, Jane Louisa Sheldon (d. 1871). In 1854, Sandhurst married Sir William Mansfield, an administrator in the British Raj, who was later made the first Baron Sandhurst. They had four sons and a daughter. After her husband's death in 1876 Lady Sandhurst became increasingly involved in both spiritualism and Liberal politics.

== Political activities ==
She was an active member of the Women's Liberal Association, and later of the Women's Liberal Federation, and was head of the order's Marylebone branch. An active philanthropist, Sandhurst ran her own home for sick children in the Marylebone Road.

In January 1889, Lady Sandhurst was elected to the London County Council at the head of the poll. However, because she was a woman, one of the defeated candidates, the Conservative Beresford Hope, petitioned against her election, and both the Court of Queen's Bench and the Court of Appeal ruled against her. Sandhurst's seat was given to Beresford Hope in May 1889, and Sandhurst was fined £5 for every vote she had given during her tenure on the council. In recognition of her sympathy towards Ireland, in September 1889, Sandhurst was awarded the Freedom of the City of Dublin.

That same year, she was also a council member of the Women's Franchise League, and supported the formation of the Women's Trade Union Association. From 1889, she was also a member of the executive committee of the Central National Society for Women's Suffrage. In 1890, she was elected president of the Society for Promoting the Return of Women as County Councillors, later (1893) renamed the Women's Local Government Society.

== Later life ==
Sandhurst wrote at least two pamphlets on her political interests, one of which, Conversations on Political Principles, was published by the Women's Liberal Federation. Lady Sandhurst died suddenly in London on 7 January 1892, at her home, 29 Park Road, Regent's Park, and was buried with her husband at Digswell, Hertfordshire.

Her descendants include the later Lord Sandhursts and the present Earl of Macclesfield
