= Baron Napier of Magdala =

Barony in the Peerage of the United Kingdom

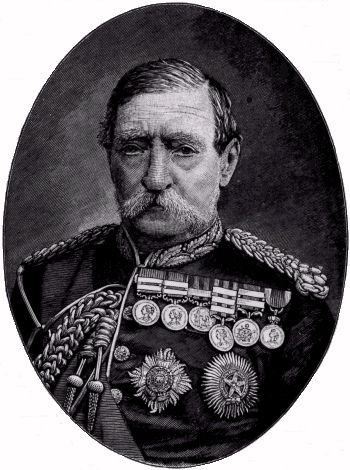
Robert Napier, 1st Baron Napier of Magdala

Baron Napier of Magdala, in Abyssinia and of Caryngton in the County Palatine of Chester, is a title in the Peerage of the United Kingdom. It was created in 1868 for the military commander Sir Robert Napier, in recognition of his part in the 1868 Expedition to Abyssinia when the town of Magdala was captured. Napier was later Commander-in-Chief in India and Governor of Gibraltar and was made a Field Marshal in 1882. He was succeeded by his eldest son, the second Baron. He served as Aide-de-Camp to his father. On his death, the title passed to his younger brother, the third Baron. He was a Colonel in the British Army. He was succeeded by his half-brother, the fourth Baron. He worked for the Indian State Railways. His son, the fifth Baron, was a Brigadier in the Royal Engineers. As of 2010, the title is held by the latter's son, the sixth Baron, who succeeded in 1987.

== Barons Napier of Magdala (1868) ==
- Robert George Cornelis Napier, 1st Baron Napier of Magdala (1810–1890)
- Robert William Napier, 2nd Baron Napier of Magdala (1845–1921)
- James Pearse Napier, 3rd Baron Napier of Magdala (1849–1935)
- Edward Herbert Scott Napier, 4th Baron Napier of Magdala (1861–1948)
- (Robert) John Napier, 5th Baron Napier of Magdala (1904–1987)
- Robert Alan Napier, 6th Baron Napier of Magdala (b. 1940)

The heir presumptive is the present holder's younger brother, the Hon Andrew Perceval Napier (b. 1947).

== Arms ==
Coat of arms of Baron Napier of Magdala
Crest On a mount Vert a lion passant Or gorged with a collar Gules and a broken chain reflexed over the back Gold supporting with the dexter forepaw a flagstaff in bend sinister Proper therefrom flowing a banner Argent charged with a cross couped Gules. Escutcheon Gules on a saltire between two mural crowns in pale and as many lions passant in fess Or a rose of the field. Supporters Dexter a soldier of the royal engineers; sinister a Sikh sirdar; both habited and each holding in his exterior hand a musket; all Proper. Motto Tu Vincula Frange
