= Hugh Rose, 1st Baron Strathnairn =

British field marshal (1801–1885)

Field Marshal The Right Honourable The Lord Strathnairn GCB GCSI PC (Ire)
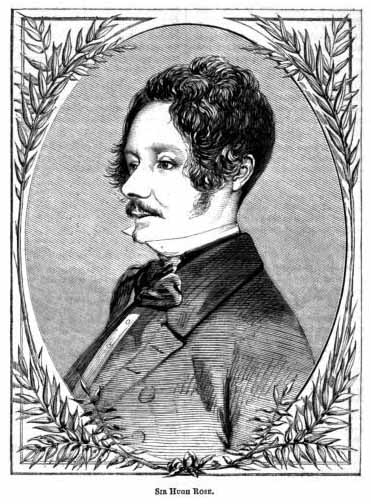
- Portrait of a younger Henry Rose, c.1831
- Born: 6 April 1801; Berlin, Germany
- Died: 16 October 1885 (aged 84); Paris, France
- Burial place: Christchurch, Hampshire
- Military career
- Allegiance: United Kingdom
- Branch: British Army; Bombay Army
- Service years: 1820–1870
- Rank: Field Marshal
- Commands: Royal Horse Guards; Bombay Army; India; Ireland
- Conflicts: Egyptian–Ottoman War; Crimean War • Battle of Inkerman • Battle of Alma • Battle of Mamelon; Indian Rebellion
- Awards: Knight Grand Cross of the Order of the Bath; Knight Grand Cross of the Order of the Star of India

Field Marshal Hugh Henry Rose, 1st Baron Strathnairn, GCB, GCSI, PC (Ire) (6 April 1801 – 16 October 1885) was a senior British Army officer. He served as a military adviser to the Ottoman Army who were seeking to secure the expulsion of the forces of Mehemet Ali from Syria during the Egyptian–Ottoman War. He then fought with the French Army at the Battle of Alma, the Battle of Inkerman and at the Battle of Mamelon during the Crimean War. During the Indian Rebellion of 1857 Rose was given command of the Central Indian Field Force and was successful at the battle of Jhansi in April 1858, at Lahar in May 1858 and at Gwalior in June 1858. He went on to be Commander of the Bombay Army, Commander-in-Chief, India and then Commander-in-Chief, Ireland.

== Early life ==
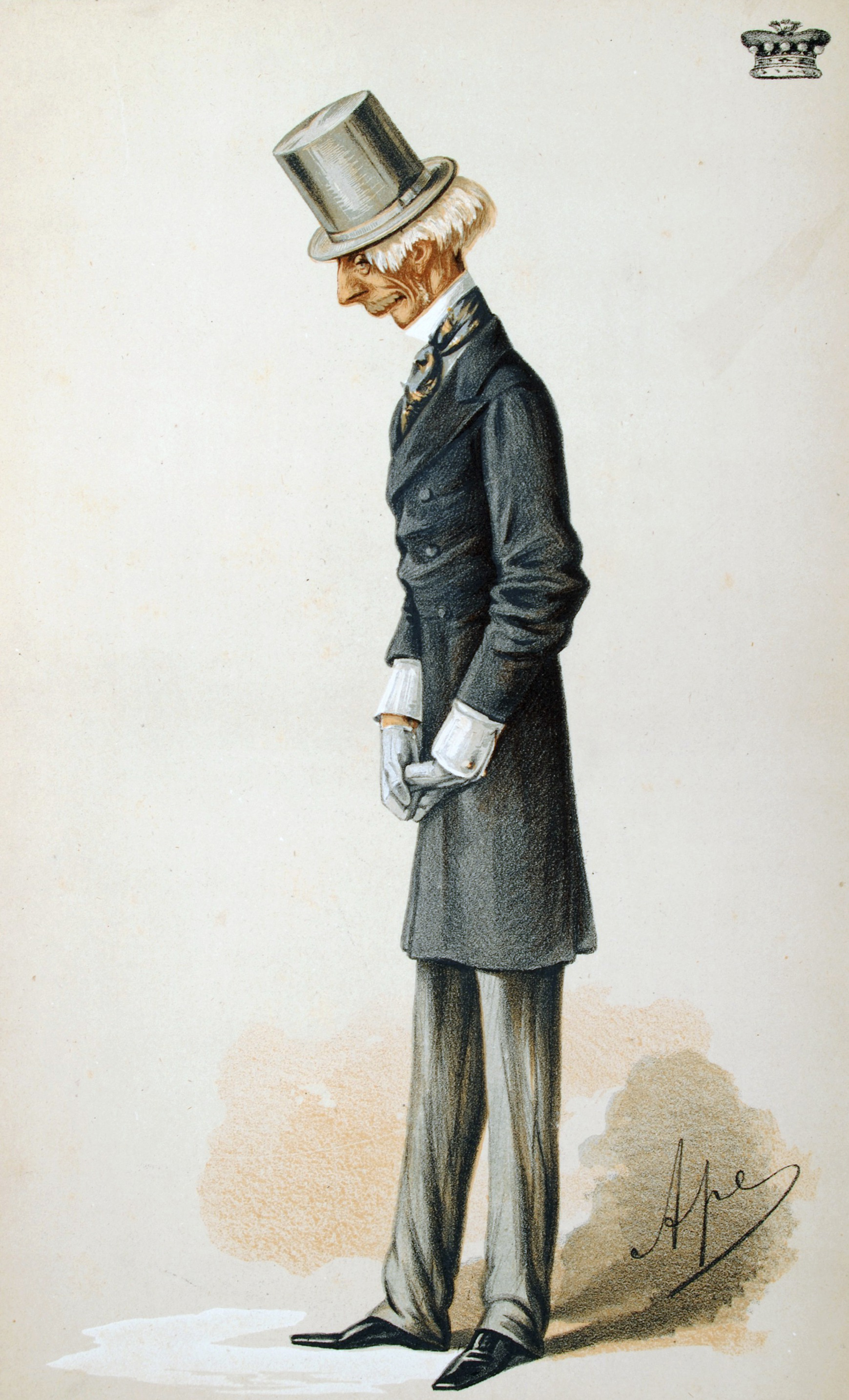
Caricature of Lord Strathnairn by Carlo Pellegrini for Vanity Fair, 1870

Born the third son of Sir George Rose of Sandhills in Christchurch (minister plenipotentiary at the Prussian court) and Frances Rose (née Duncombe), Rose was educated by officers of the Prussian Army in Berlin, where he had been born. He went up to St John's College, Cambridge in 1819 and was commissioned into the 93rd Sutherland Highlanders as an ensign on 8 June 1820. He was sent to Ireland to help preserve order following the "Ribbon" outrages and joined the 19th Regiment of Foot there on 20 July 1820. He was promoted to lieutenant on 24 October 1821, to captain on 22 July 1824 and to major in an unattached company on 30 December 1826. He joined the 92nd Highlanders as a company commander on 19 February 1829 and became equerry to the Duke of Cambridge in July 1830. He returned to the 92nd Highlanders again in July 1832 and served with them in Tipperary, Gibraltar and Malta. In Malta, he visited every one of his troops infected by cholera and enthused them with his cheerful manner. He was promoted to lieutenant-colonel on 17 September 1839.

== Syria ==
In November 1840 Rose was sent, as one of a group of British military advisers, to Syria with the local rank of colonel to assist General Omar Pasha, commander of the Ottoman Army, who was seeking to secure the expulsion of the forces of Mehemet Ali from Syria during the Egyptian–Ottoman War. Rose served as deputy adjutant-general on Pasha's staff at the Battle of El Mesden in January 1841 and then became senior British officer on Pasha's staff later that year. He became British consul-general for Syria and Lebanon in August 1841 and found himself preventing feuds between the Maronites and Druzes. On one occasion in 1841, he rode between them at imminent risk to his life and by the sheer force of a stronger will stopped the conflict. On another occasion he rescued 700 American missionaries from Mount Lebanon and took them to Beirut walking himself all the way so that his horse could be available to old women. He transferred to the diplomatic service in January 1848 and Lord Palmerston appointed him secretary of the embassy at Constantinople in January 1851. He became chargé d'affaires in the absence of Sir Stratford Canning during a diplomatic crisis over Russian demands that they be allowed to give protection over all Christians in Turkey. He so strengthened the hands of the Ottoman Porte that the Russian attempt to force a secret treaty upon Turkey was foiled. He was promoted to brevet colonel on 11 November 1851.

== Crimean War ==
Promoted to the substantive rank of colonel on 11 June 1852, Rose became the British commissioner at the headquarters of the French Army at the outset of the Crimean War in October 1853. Promoted to the local rank of brigadier-general on 8 April 1854, he succeeded in putting out a fire which threatened the French small-arm ammunition stores for which he was awarded the French Legion of Honour. He fought with the 1st Zouaves at the Battle of Alma in September 1854, where he was wounded, at the Battle of Inkerman in November 1854 and at the Battle of Mamelon in June 1855. He was promoted to major-general on 12 December 1854.

== Indian Rebellion of 1857 ==
Following the outbreak of the Indian Rebellion of 1857 Rose was given command of the Poona division. He arrived in September 1857, and shortly after took command of the newly created Central Indian Field Force made up mostly of sepoys and elements of the army maintained by the Nizam of Hyderabad. He marched from Mhow in January 1858, captured Rahatgarh after a short siege, defeated the Raja of Banapur near Baroda, relieved the City of Saugor, captured the fortress at Garhakota and then defeated the rebels in the Madanpur pass.

Rose arrived at Jhansi on 21 March 1858 and during the siege defeated a relieving force under Tatya Tope at the Betwa on 1 April 1858. Most of Rose's force was locked up in the siege and so he could only field 1,540 men against Tatya Tope's army of 20,000 troops and 28 guns. With the advantage of Punjabi-Afghan sepoys he was able to rout the enemy, inflicting a total loss of 1,500 men and all of their stores. Jhansi was stormed and the city taken on 4 April 1858. However the Queen, Rani Lakshmibai, who had defended the fort, made an escape to Kalpi. Rose went on to capture Lahar, Konch and Kalpi in May 1858.

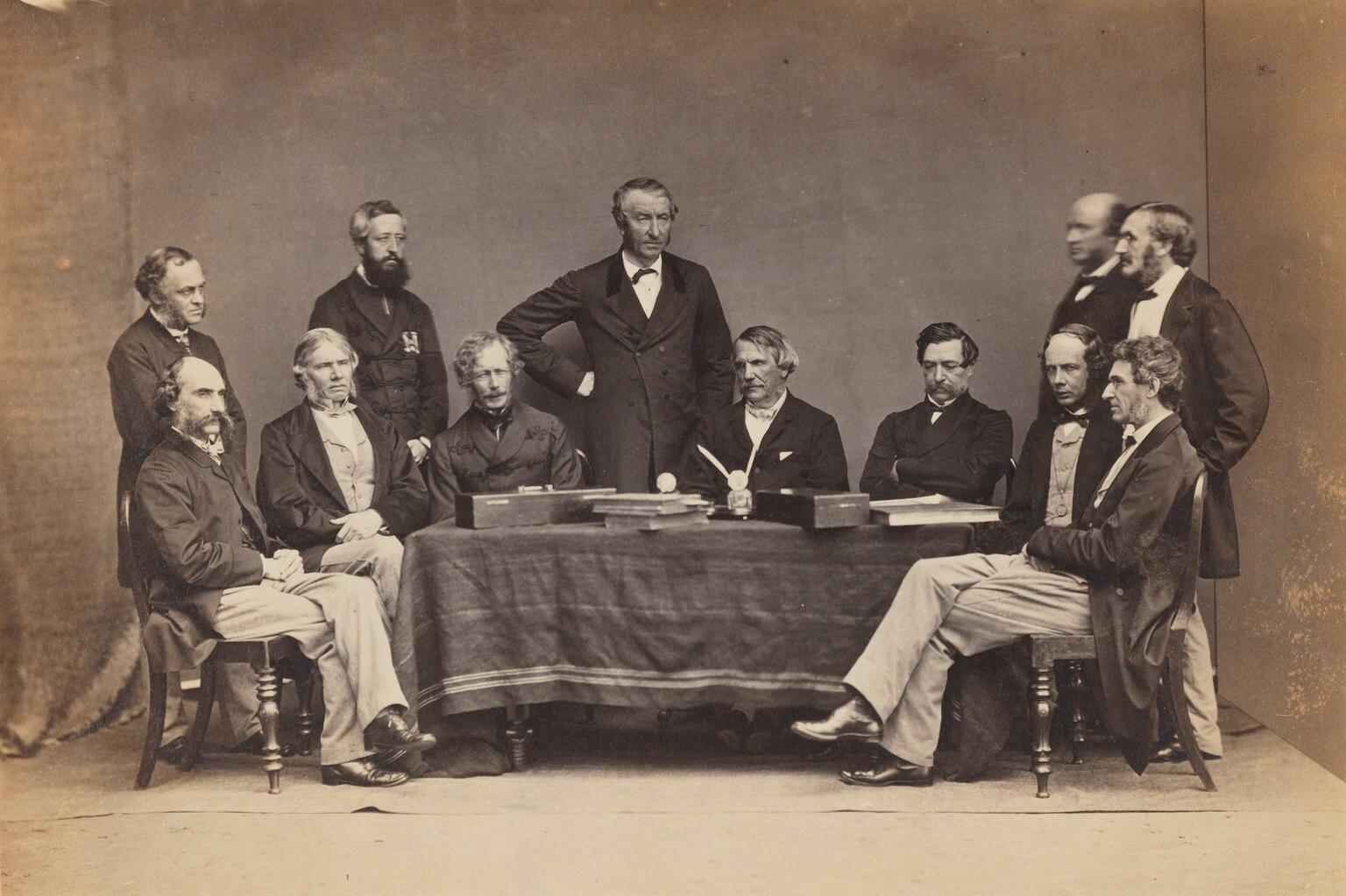
Hugh Rose, sitting third from left, with John Lawrence, Viceroy of India and other council members. c. 1864

Rose then obtained sick leave and Sir Robert Napier was appointed to succeed him. However, before Napier could arrive the forces of the Maharaja of Gwalior joined the rebellion. Rose at once resumed command and moved on Gwalior, capturing the city in June 1858. Rose was promoted to lieutenant-general for his "eminent services" on 28 February 1860 and the next month was appointed commander-in-chief of the Bombay Army. He was promoted to the local rank of general on 18 May 1860 and on the departure of Lord Clyde from India in November 1860 Rose succeeded him as Commander-in-Chief, India.

== Later life and legacy ==
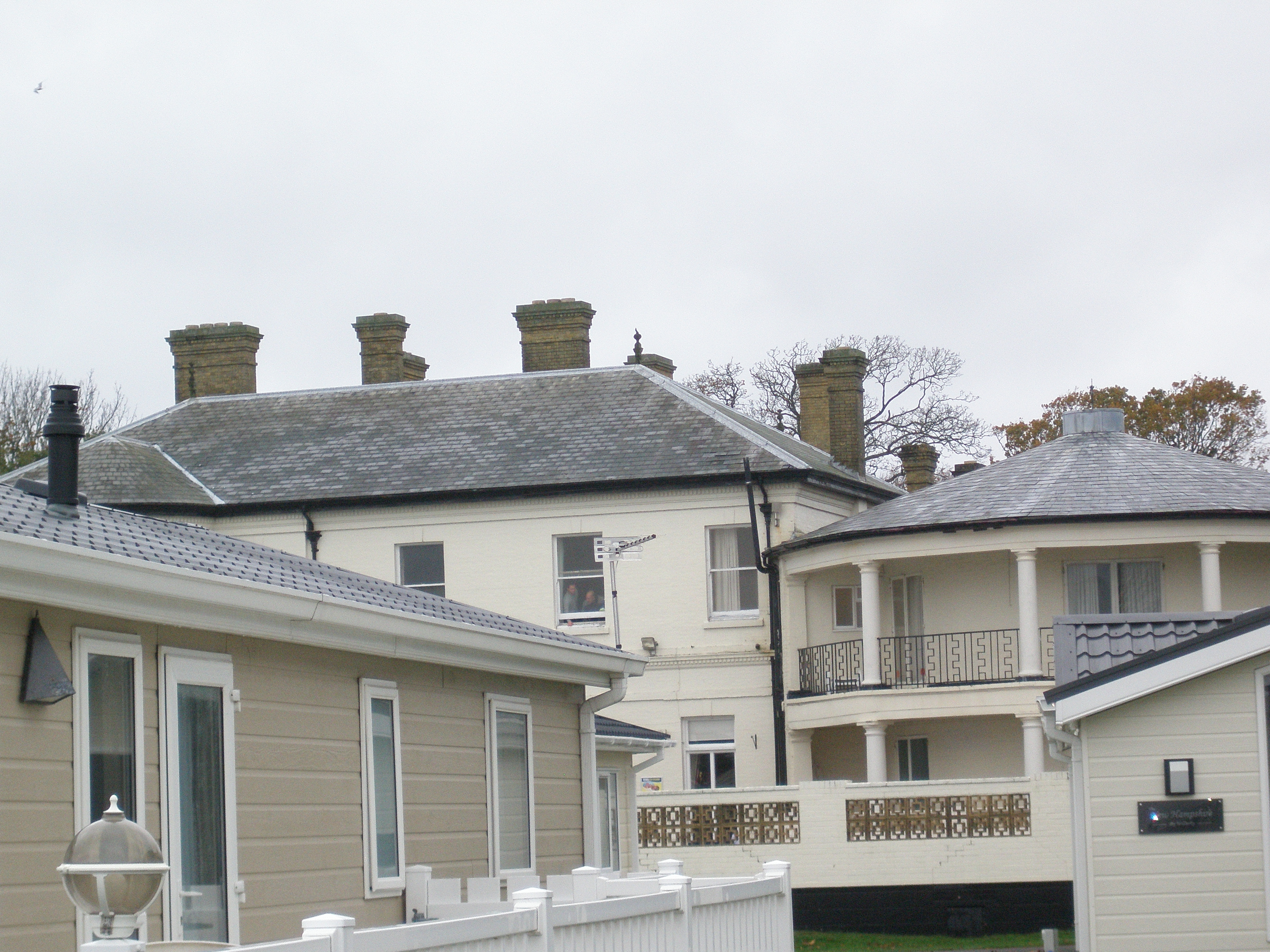
Sandhills, Christchurch, Dorset, Rose's summer residence

Rose was made an honorary DCL of the University of Oxford in 1865. He became Commander-in-Chief, Ireland with the local rank of general in July 1865, in which role he assisted the Irish government to deal with the Fenian conspiracy, and was raised to the peerage as Baron Strathnairn, of Strathnairn in the County of Nairn and of Jhansi in the India on 28 July 1866. He was promoted to the substantive rank of full general on 4 February 1867 and was made an honorary LL.D. of Trinity College, Dublin when he retired from the Irish Command in 1870. Back in England he lived in retirement at Newsells Park in Hertfordshire. Rose was keen on horses and had an obelisk erected there in memory of his favourite charger which he had ridden during the Indian Rebellion.

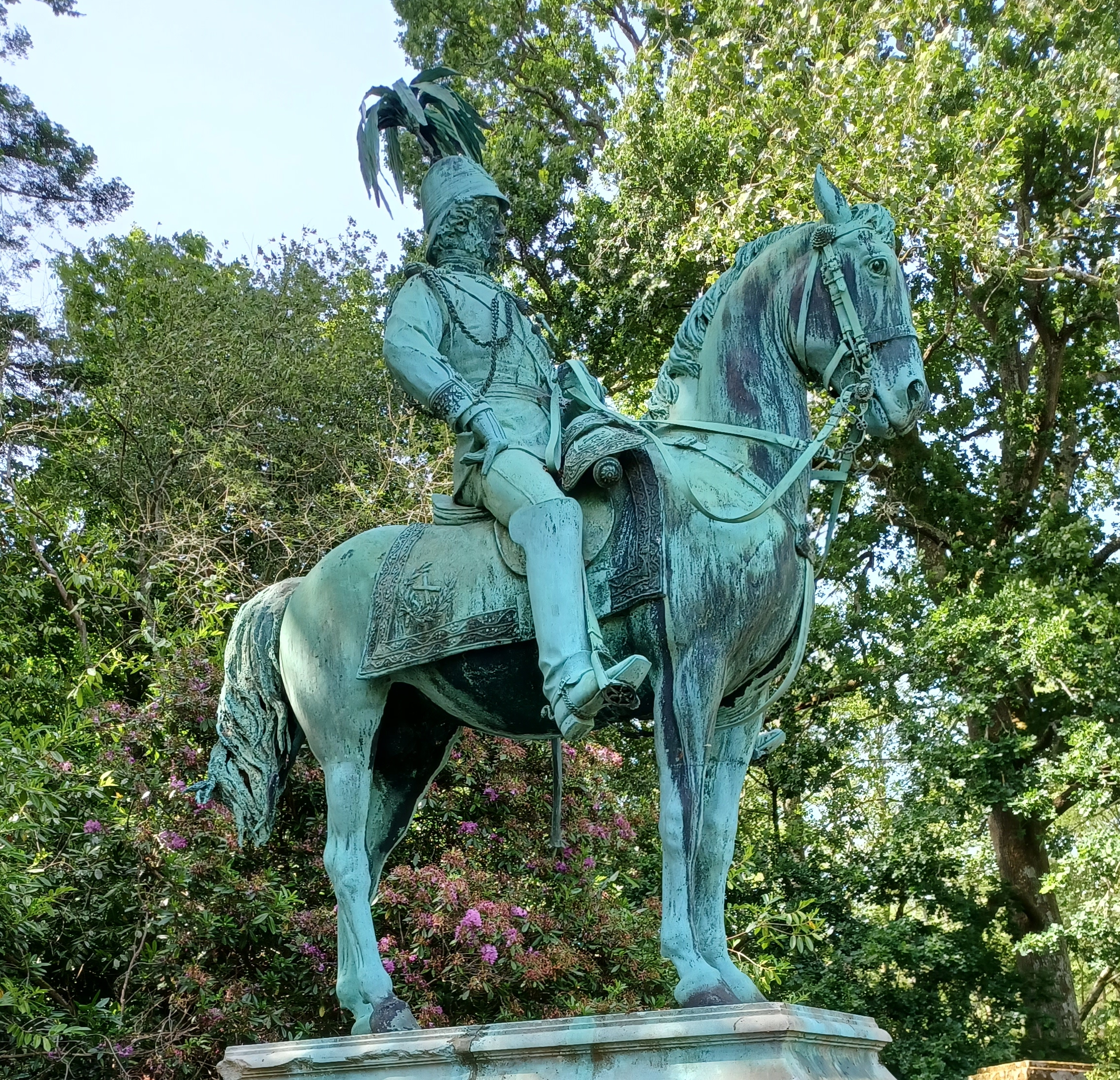
Statue of Hugh Rose, 1st Baron Strathnairn at Griggs Green (originally positioned in Knightsbridge)

Rose also served as colonel of the 45th Regiment of Foot (1858–66), of the 26th Middlesex Rifle Volunteer Corps, of the 92nd (Gordon Highlanders) Regiment of Foot (1866–69) and then of the Royal Horse Guards (1869–85).

He was promoted to field marshal on 2 June 1877 and died in Paris on 16 October 1885. He was buried in the graveyard of the Priory Church, Christchurch in Hampshire. An equestrian bronze statue, by E. Onslow Ford, RA, was erected to his memory at Knightsbridge, London; it was removed and put in storage in 1931. In 1964 it was privately purchased and is now located at Griggs Green in Hampshire. There is also a memorial to him in St Paul's Cathedral.

== Family ==
Rose was brother to Sir William Rose and the Countess of Morton. He never married and never had any children.

== Honours ==
Rose's honours included:

1. Knight Grand Cross of the Order of the Bath (GCB) – 6 July 1858 (KCB – 16 October 1855; CB – 23 February 1842)
2. Knight Grand Cross of the Order of the Star of India (GCSI) (KSI – 25 June 1861)
3. Prussian Order of Saint John of Jerusalem (Prussia) – 6 March 1849
4. Legion of Honour, 3rd Class (France) – 2 August 1856
5. Order of the Medjidie, 3rd Class (Ottoman Empire) – 2 March 1858

== Ancestry ==
Ancestors of Hugh Rose, 1st Baron Strathnairn

8. Rev. David Rose of Lethnot
4. George Rose
9. Margaret Rose of Wester Clune
2. Sir George Henry Rose
10. John Duer of Fulham, Middlesex and Antigua
5. Theodora Duer
11. Frances Frye
1. Field Marshal Hugh Henry Rose, 1st Baron Strathnairn
12. Thomas Duncombe
6. Thomas Duncombe
13. Mary Slingsby
3. Frances Duncombe
14. Sir Philip Jennings-Clerke, 1st Baronet
7. Anne Jennings
15. Anne Thompson

== Sources ==
- David, Saul (2003). The Indian Mutiny: 1857. Penguin. ISBN 978-0141005546.
- Gilliat, Edward (1914). Heroes of the Indian Mutiny. Seeley, Service & Co.
- Heathcote, Tony (1999). The British Field Marshals, 1736–1997: A Biographical Dictionary. Barnsley: Leo Cooper. ISBN 0-85052-696-5.
- Jerosch, Rainer (2007). Rani of Jhansi: Rebel Against Will. Aakar Books. ISBN 978-8189833152.
- Robson, Brian, ed. (2000). Sir Hugh Rose and the Central India Campaign 1858. Army Records Society. Sutton. ISBN 978-0750925419.

== Military Offices ==
Military offices
Preceded by Sir Henry Somerset	C-in-C, Bombay Army; 1860	Succeeded by Sir William Mansfield
Preceded by The Lord Clyde	Commander-in-Chief, India; 1861–1865	Succeeded by The Lord Sandhurst
Preceded by Sir George Brown	Commander-in-Chief, Ireland; 1865–1870	Succeeded by The Lord Sandhurst
Preceded by The Viscount Gough	Colonel of the Royal Horse Guards; 1869–1885	Succeeded by Sir Patrick Grant
Preceded by Sir John MacDonald	Colonel of the 92nd (Gordon Highlanders) Regiment of Foot; 1866–1869	Succeeded by John Campbell
Preceded by Sir Thomas Brabazon Aylmer	Colonel of the 45th (the Nottinghamshire) Regiment of Foot; 1858–1866	Succeeded by Thomas Armstrong Drought
Peerage of the United Kingdom
New creation	Baron Strathnairn; 1866–1885	Extinct
