= Second Battle of Cawnpore =

Battle during Indian Rebellion of 1857 at Kanpur

Coordinates: 26.449923°N 80.331874°E

- Part of the Indian Rebellion of 1857
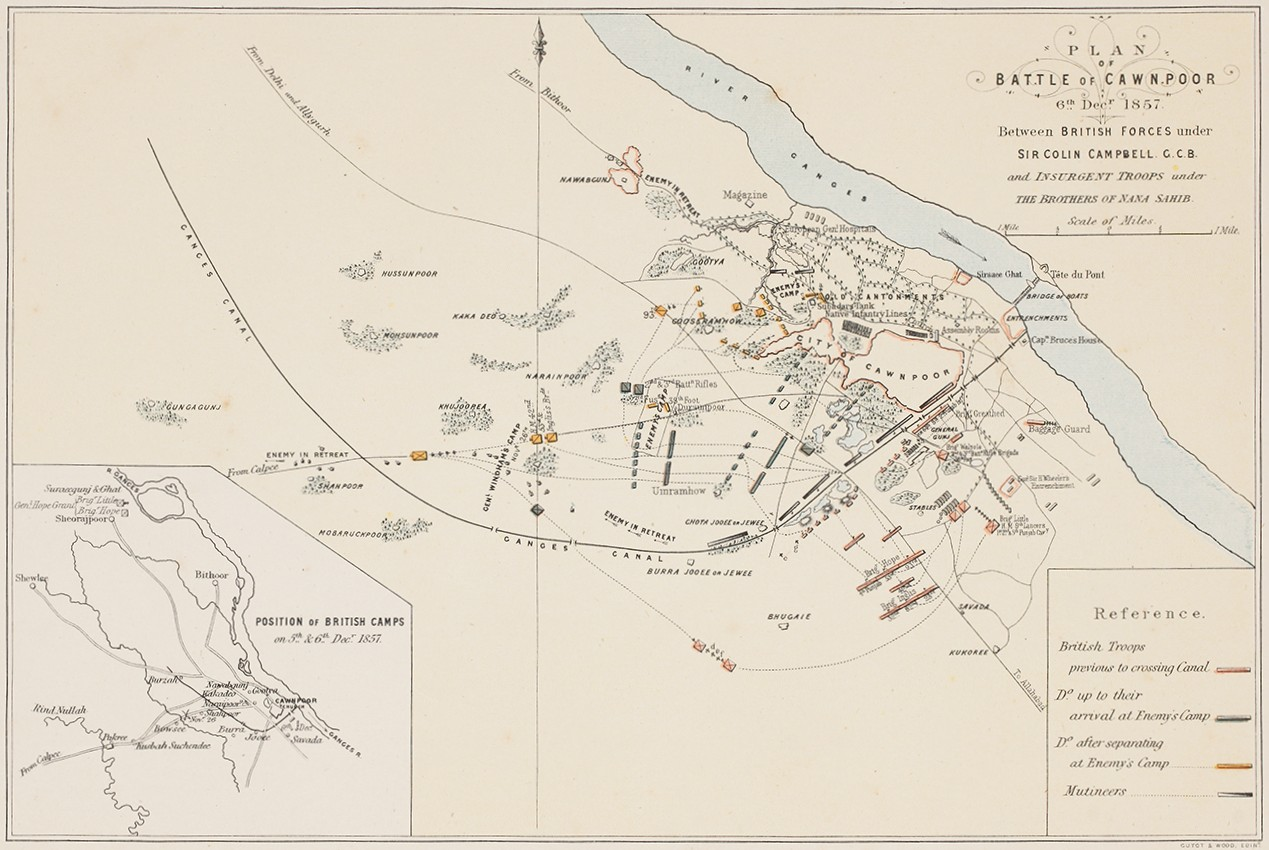
- Plan of Battle of Cawnpoor, 6 December 1857 (Guyot & Wood, c. 1858)
Date	19 November – 6 December 1857
Location	Cawnpore, India
Result	British–EIC victory

Belligerents
(United Kingdom) British Empire; East India Company	Rebel Company sepoys

Commanders and leaders
(United Kingdom) Sir Colin Campbell	Tatya Tope; Rao Sahib

Strength
10,000 men 65 guns	14,000 men 40 guns

Casualties and losses
99 killed and wounded	Unknown; but heavy 32 guns captured

The Second Battle of Cawnpore was a battle of Indian Rebellion of 1857 that was decisive by thwarting the rebels' last chance to regain the initiative and to recapture the cities of Cawnpore (now Kanpur) and Lucknow.

== Background ==
During the 1857 uprising against the East India Company, Kanpur (then spelled Cawnpore) had fallen to the rebel leader Nana Sahib. The Company forces led by Major General Henry Havelock recaptured the town on 17 July 1857. Soon after he arrived at Cawnpore, Havelock received news that Henry Lawrence, the British Resident in Awadh (referred to at the time as Oudh) had died, and that the Company forces were besieged and facing a defeat at Lucknow. Havelock decided to attempt to relieve Lucknow. He fought against the rebel forces blocking his way, winning victories at Unnao (or Unao) and Bashiratganj (or Bashiratgunj), though at a high cost in casualties. However, he was soon informed that the Gwalior army had also rebelled against Company rule. Havelock realized that his forces were not strong enough to fight their way to Lucknow, and returned to Cawnpore on 13 August to await reinforcements.

Once reinforced, the British forces began constructing a bridge over the Ganges River, but the rebel soldiers attacked the bridge from the northern bank. Havelock sent Brasyer's Sikhs regiment to cover the construction. The Sikh regiment forced the rebel soldiers to retreat, and the bridge was completed without further interference.

The reinforced British army under Havelock and Lieutenant General Sir James Outram then set out for Lucknow. They were able to enter the city, but became besieged themselves.

Another, larger, force under General Colin Campbell, the new Commander-in-Chief, India, gathered in Cawnpore to make a second relief of Lucknow. While he led his main force to Lucknow, Campbell left a detachment of about 1,500 men under Brigadier Charles Ash Windham to hold Cawnpore, the vital bridge of boats across the Ganges, and the entrenchment constructed to protect it. Windham had a reputation for bravery gained in the Crimean War, and was nicknamed "Redan" Windham, after a Russian fortification at Sevastopol. However, Campbell left Windham with very precise instructions which appeared to deprive him of any opportunity to exercise his own initiative.

Meanwhile, the Nana Sahib's lieutenant, Tantya Tope, had gathered an army to recapture Cawnpore. The core of this army was the Gwalior Contingent. This was a body of troops in the service of the ruler of Gwalior, but which was recruited and organised on the same lines as the Bengal Presidency Army of the East India Company. The Gwalior Contingent had mutinied against their British officers in June and July. They had since remained undecided as to their next course of action until Tantya Tope took charge of them, and led them to Kalpi on the Jumna River on 10 November. Tantya Tope left a garrison of 3,000 men and 20 guns in Kalpi, while he himself crossed the river with 6,000 men and 18 guns and moved east on Cawnpore.

== Tantya Tope recaptures Cawnpore ==
By 19 November, Tantya Tope's advance guard dominated all the routes west and north-west of Cawnpore, and had cut off all supplies to the city. Windham was aware on 20 November that Campbell had gained success at Lucknow, but on 22 November he also had an erroneous report that a rebel force had captured a bridge over Bani River, which lay on Campbell's line of withdrawal from Lucknow, and sent a small force including two guns to recover it. By 24 November, without communications with Campbell, he nevertheless decided to ignore Campbell's instructions and attack Tantya Tope before he could threaten the entrenchment.

On 26 November, a rebel advance guard of 2,500 men, 500 cavalry and 6 heavy guns had reached a river, the Pandu Nadi, west of Cawnpore. Windham moved forward to attack them with 1,200 infantry, 200 cavalry and 12 guns. He drove back the rebels, capturing three of their guns but then discovered that Tantya Tope's main body of 20,000 troops and 40 guns was close at hand. Windham tried to make an orderly withdrawal but some of his troops (a battalion made up of a mixed bag of detachments of several regiments) misbehaved, retreating without orders and looting drink and supplies when they reached the entrenchment. By midday of 27 November, Windham had been driven back into his entrenchments. The rebels captured all the baggage and stores which had been left outside the entrenchments in a building on the road to Bithoor and were threatening the vital bridge of boats over the Ganges.

== Evacuation of civilians ==
Meanwhile, Campbell was withdrawing from Lucknow with 3,000 troops and a convoy containing 2,000 sick, wounded and non-combatants who had been evacuated from Lucknow. On 26 November, he heard artillery fire from the direction of Cawnpore. Fearing for the safety of the bridge and Cawnpore, Campbell left his infantry to protect the convoy and moved ahead with his cavalry and horse artillery. To his relief, when he arrived on the north bank of the Ganges on 28 November, the bridge was still intact. Windham held the entrenchment, but the Tantya Tope's army had occupied the city of Cawnpore and the ground between the city and the Ganges.

Campbell crossed the bridge the next day. He deployed his artillery on the north bank of the river to fire on the rebels threatening the bridge, and then slowly filed the carts and other vehicles of the convoy across the bridge. The process took three days to complete. Although several officers urged Campbell to attack as soon as the north bank was evacuated, Campbell delayed for another five days while all the non-combatants were ferried down-river to safety. Campbell was later to be known for his caution and deliberation, becoming irreverently known as "Sir Crawling Camel".

== Tantya Tope defeated ==
The rebels had continued to make some attacks on the British positions. On 4 December, they attempted to destroy the bridge by floating blazing rafts down the river. An attack on the entire British line on 5 December was beaten off. Campbell was now ready to make his own attack, having received 5,600 reinforcements with 35 guns.

The rebels numbered 14,000 with up to 40 guns. Their left, which included some of the Nana Sahib's retainers, rested on the Ganges and was protected by a canal running from the river. Their centre held the city of Cawnpore itself, which had thick walls and a warren of narrow streets. Their right wing, which included the Gwalior Contingent, occupied an open plain with scattered lime kilns and brick mounds. Campbell calculated that the city of Cawnpore would impede the movement of rebels from their left to their right flank.

On 6 December, Windham opened a violent bombardment from the entrenchment to deceive the rebels that Campbell was about to attack their left. The real attack was made on their right, curling around the city of Cawnpore to threaten the rebels' links to Kalpi. Campbell's artillery, which included many guns that were heavier than those possessed by the rebels, particularly the 24-pounders manned by the sailors of the Naval Brigade, was the decisive factor. Campbell reported that "On this occasion there was the sight beheld of 24-pounder guns advancing with the first line of skirmishers."

As the Gwalior Contingent broke and fled, the Nana Sahib's own retainers and adherents were defeated north of the city. The pursuit by Campbell's cavalry was pressed as hard as possible, capturing almost every gun and cart from the rebels. At Bithoor, the Nana Sahib's treasury was captured the next day, concealed in a well.

== Results ==
The rebels had attacked Cawnpore at the most favourable possible moment, under one of their most dynamic and charismatic leaders, and yet they had been defeated. From this point on, increasing numbers of British reinforcements were to arrive in India and the rebellion was doomed to defeat, although Tantya Tope and other determined leaders continued to resist for more than a year.

== See also ==
- Siege of Cawnpore
- Thomas Flynn (VC)
