= Robert Napier, 1st Baron Napier of Magdala =

British army officer (1810–1890)

Field Marshal The Right Honourable The Lord Napier of Magdala GCB GCSI FRS
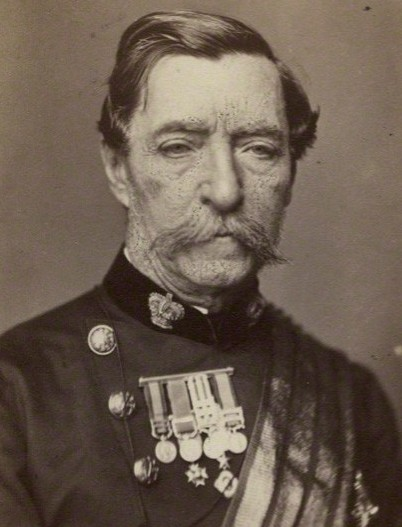
- Born: Robert Cornelis Napier; 6 December 1810; Colombo, British Ceylon
- Died: 14 January 1890 (aged 79); London, England, UK
- Alma mater: Addiscombe Military Seminary
- Spouses: Anne Pearse (m. 1840; died 1849); Maria Cecilia Smythe Scott (m. 1861)
- Military career
- Allegiance: United Kingdom
- Branch: British Indian Army
- Service years: 1828–1890
- Rank: Field marshal
- Commands: Bombay Army
- Wars: First Anglo-Sikh War; Second Anglo-Sikh War; Indian Rebellion; Second Opium War; Abyssinian Expedition

Viceroy and Governor-General of India
- Acting
- In office 21 November – 2 December 1863
- Monarch: Victoria
- Prime Minister: Henry John Temple, 3rd Viscount Palmerston
- Secretary of State for India: Charles Wood, 1st Viscount Halifax
- Preceded by: James Bruce, 8th Earl of Elgin
- Succeeded by: William Denison

Field Marshal Robert Cornelis Napier, 1st Baron Napier of Magdala, GCB, GCSI, FRS (6 December 1810 – 14 January 1890) was a British Indian Army officer. He fought in the First Anglo-Sikh War and the Second Anglo-Sikh War before seeing action as chief engineer during the second relief of Lucknow in March 1858 during the Indian Rebellion of 1857. He also served in the Second Opium War as commander of the 2nd division of the expeditionary force which took part in the Battle of Taku Forts, the surrender of Peking's Anting Gate and the entry to Peking in 1860. He subsequently led the punitive expedition to Abyssinia in July 1867, defeating the Emperor Tewodros II of Ethiopia with minimal loss of life among his own forces and rescuing the hostages of Tewodros.

== Military career ==
=== Early career ===
Born the son of Major Charles Frederick Napier, who was wounded at the storming of Meester Cornelis (now Jatinegara) in Java on (26 August 1810) and died some months later, and Catherine Napier (née Carrington), Napier was educated at Addiscombe Military Seminary before being commissioned into the Bengal Engineers on 15 December 1826. He attended the Royal Engineer Establishment at Chatham with the rank of ensign from 7 June 1827 before being promoted to lieutenant on 28 September 1827 and being sent to India in November 1828. After commanding a company at Delhi, he was employed in the irrigation works of the Public Works Department until 1836 when he returned to England for leave on account of his poor health. Promoted to captain on 25 January 1841, he was appointed garrison engineer at Sirhind in 1842.

=== First Anglo-Sikh War ===
Napier served under Sir Hugh Gough during the First Anglo-Sikh War and commanded the Bengal Engineers at the Battle of Mudki in December 1845. He was severely wounded at the Battle of Ferozeshah in December 1845 while storming the Sikh camp and was also present at the Battle of Sobraon in February 1846. Promoted to brevet major on 3 April 1846, he was chief engineer at the siege of the fortress of Kote Kangra in the Punjab by Brigadier-General Wheeler in May 1846.

=== Second Anglo-Sikh War ===
Having been appointed as consulting engineer to the Punjab resident and to the Council of Regency of the Punjab, Napier was called to direct the siege of Multan in September 1848 at the outset of the Second Anglo-Sikh War. He was wounded during the siege but managed to recover sufficiently to be present at the successful storming of Multan in January 1849 and at the surrender of the fortress of Chiniot shortly thereafter. He took part in the Battle of Gujrat in February 1849 and accompanied Sir Walter Gilbert as he pursued the Sikhs all the way to Rawalpindi and was present at the surrender ceremony of the Sikh Army. He was promoted to brevet lieutenant-colonel on 7 June 1849 and became chief engineer to the Board of Administration of Punjab Province at the end of the War.

=== North-West Frontier ===
In December 1852 Napier took command of a column in the first Hazara expedition, (Note: Also see Muhammad Habib Khan Tarin) and in November 1853 against the Afridis on the North-West frontier. He crushed the Afridi Pashtun rebellion in the North-West Frontier Province and was promoted to the brevet rank of colonel on 28 November 1854 and the substantive rank of lieutenant colonel on 15 April 1856.

=== Indian Rebellion of 1857 ===
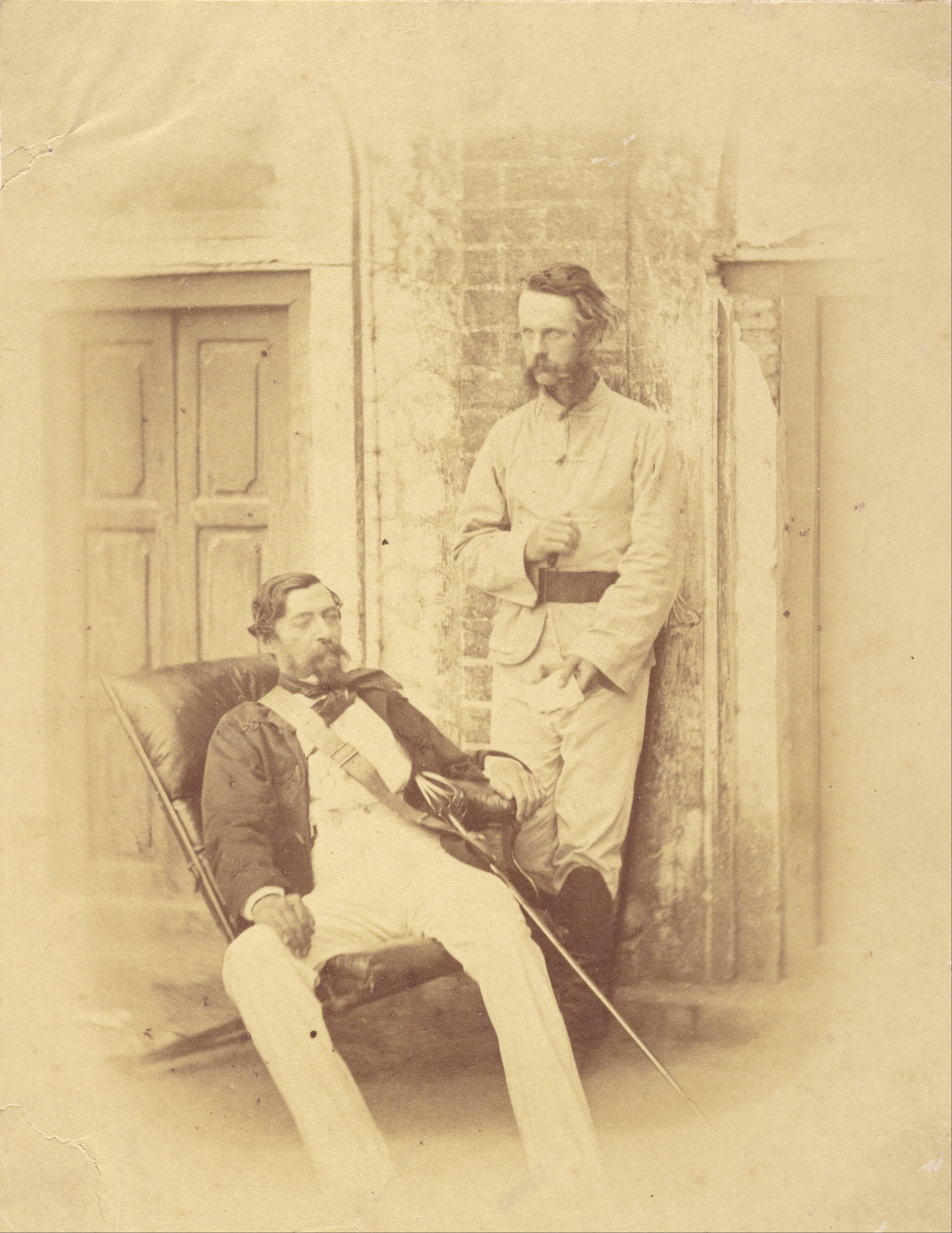
Napier (left) in India

Napier was appointed military secretary and adjutant general to Sir James Outram, whose forces took part in the actions leading to the first relief of Lucknow in September 1857. He remained as chief engineer until the second relief in November 1857, when he was badly wounded while crossing an exposed space with Outram and Sir Henry Havelock to meet with Sir Colin Campbell. He recovered sufficiently to be present at the capture of Lucknow in March 1858.

Napier then joined Sir Hugh Rose as second-in-command for the march on Gwalior and commanded the 2nd Brigade at the Battle of Morar in June 1858. After Gwalior was captured by the British, Napier and his 700 men pursued, caught and defeated Tatya Tope's force of 12,000 men on the plains of Jaora Alipur. After Sir Hugh Rose's departure, Napier assumed command of the Gwalior division and helped capture Paori in August 1858, routed Prince Ferozepore at Ranode in December 1858 and secured the surrender of Man Singh and Tatya Tope, ending the war, in January 1859.

== China ==
In January 1860, during the Second Opium War, Napier assumed command of the 2nd Division of the expeditionary force under Sir James Hope Grant. In the Battle of Taku Forts he led the assault on the main northern fort on 21 August 1860 where he counted six bullet holes in his clothing and equipment. The Anting Gate in Peking was surrendered to Napier on 13 October 1860 and he was responsible for protecting Lord Elgin's line of march into Peking on 24 October 1860. He was promoted to brevet major-general on 15 February 1861 and to the substantive rank of colonel on 18 February 1861.

Napier became the military member of the Council of the Governor-General of India in 1861, acting for a short while as Governor-General after the sudden death of Lord Elgin. He assumed command of the Bombay Army with the local rank of lieutenant general on 7 February 1865 and received promotion to the substantive rank of lieutenant-general on 1 March 1867 before taking command of the punitive expedition to Abyssinia July 1867.

== Abyssinia ==
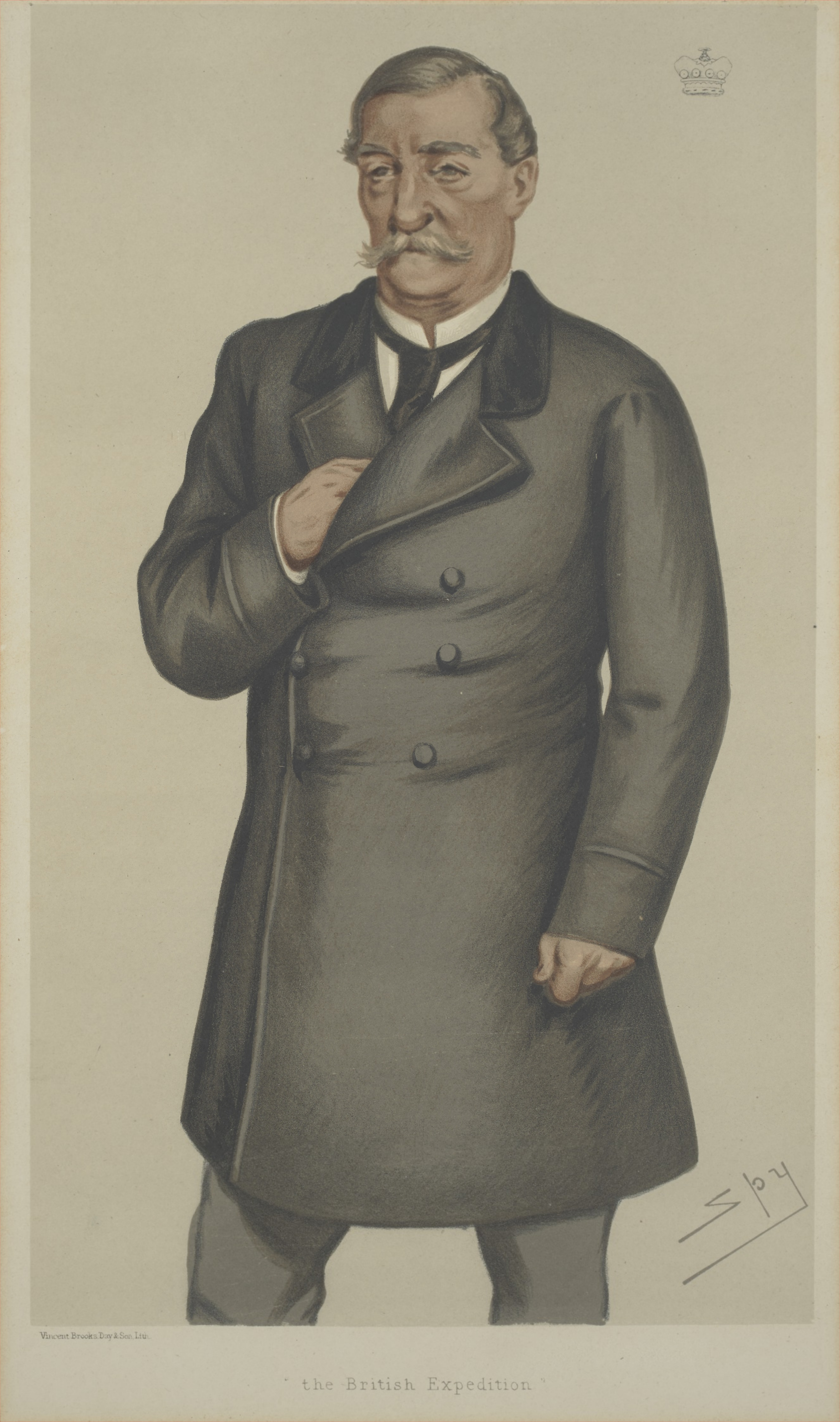
"The British Expedition". Caricature by Spy published in Vanity Fair in 1878.

Napier achieved his greatest fame as an army officer when he led the expedition of 1868 against Emperor Tewodros II of Ethiopia. The Ethiopian ruler was holding a number of Protestant missionaries hostage, in his mountain capital of Magdala, as well as two British diplomats who had attempted to negotiate their freedom (Tewodros had unwisely taken them hostage as well). After months of planning and other preparations, the advance guard of engineers landed at Zula on the Red Sea to construct a port on 30 October 1867; Napier himself arrived in Zula on 2 January 1868, and on 25 January 1868 led his troops south into the Ethiopian Highlands.

The expedition involved crossing 400 miles (644 km) of mountainous terrain lacking roads or bridges occupied by local people with a known history of hostility towards outsiders. The expedition overcame the first obstacle, the terrain, by thorough logistical planning and engineering ability. Shrewd diplomacy dealt with the second obstacle, local opposition. On the one hand, Napier made it clear to the Ethiopians that the sole intent of the British force was to rescue the imprisoned Europeans—not conquest; on the other, Napier met with local potentates such as Ras Kassa (the future Emperor Yohannes IV) and arranged to purchase needed supplies with the 4.35 million Maria Theresa thalers (the preferred currency of the area) the British had purchased from the mint in Vienna. What helped Napier was the general disaffection with, if not hostility to, Tewodros, and a desire to replace him, held by several native leaders, as well as a general sense that his hostage-taking was bound to lead to trouble.

Napier's troops reached the foot of Magdala on 9 April 1868. The next day, Good Friday, he defeated the 9,000 troops still loyal to Tewodros at the Battle of Magdala for the loss of only 2 British lives. Although Emperor Tewodros surrendered his hostages and made repeated efforts for a negotiated surrender, the distrustful Napier pressed on and ordered an assault on the mountain redoubt on 13 April 1868. The British captured Magdala, and Emperor Tewodros killed himself, leaving a grandiose statement that he preferred to "fall into the hands of God, rather than man." Napier then ordered the destruction of Tewodros' artillery and the burning of Magdala as revenge for Tewodros's hostage taking; his palace was sacked by members of the expedition.

After the Ethiopian campaign, Napier was made a Fellow of the Royal Society and a Freeman of the City of London. He was also elevated to the peerage as Baron Napier of Magdala on 11 July 1868 and granted an annuity for life.

== Later career ==
Napier became Commander-in-Chief, India, with the local rank of full general in April 1870, and having been promoted to the substantive rank of full general on 1 April 1874, he became Governor of Gibraltar in June 1876. In February 1878, however, he was recalled to London and appointed to command an expeditionary force which was being prepared in anticipation of a war with Russia. When war did not break out he returned to his duties in Gibraltar. In November 1879 he represented Queen Victoria at Madrid as ambassador extraordinary upon the occasion of Alfonso XII of Spain's second marriage and in December 1879 he became a member of the Royal Commission on the organisation of the army. Standing down as Governor of Gibraltar, he was promoted to field marshal on 1 January 1883.

Napier was also honorary colonel of the 3rd London Rifle Volunteer Corps and colonel-commandant of the Royal Engineers. In January 1887 he was appointed Constable of the Tower of London.

Napier died of influenza at his residence in London on 14 January 1890. He was given a state funeral and buried in St Paul's Cathedral on 21 January 1890.

== Legacy ==
In 1883 the British government installed one Armstrong 100 ton gun in a battery in Gibraltar that they named the Napier of Magdala Battery and in 1891 a statue of Napier on horseback by Sir Joseph Boehm was unveiled in front of Carlton House Gardens in London: it was moved to Queen's Gate, Kensington in 1920.

The descendants of the Third City of London Rifle Volunteer Corps are located within Napier House Army Reserve Centre, Grove Park, London; the building is named in his honour.

== Honours ==
Napier's honours included:

- Knight Grand Cross of the Order of the Bath (GCB) – 27 April 1868 (KCB – 27 July 1858)
- Knight Grand Commander of the Order of the Star of India (GCSI) – 16 September 1867

Coat of arms of Robert Napier, 1st Baron Napier of Magdala
Crest On a mount Vert a lion passant Or gorged with a collar Gules and a broken chain reflexed over the back Gold supporting with the dexter forepaw a flagstaff in bend sinister Proper therefrom flowing a banner Argent charged with a cross couped Gules. Escutcheon Gules on a saltire between two mural crowns in pale and as many lions passant in fess Or a rose of the field. Supporters Dexter a soldier of the royal engineers; sinister a Sikh sirdar; both habited and each holding in his exterior hand a musket; all Proper. Motto Tu Vincula Frange

== Family ==
In June 1840 Napier married Anne Pearse; they had three sons and three daughters before his wife died in childbirth in 1849. In April 1861 he married Maria Cecilia Smythe Scott: they had six sons and three daughters.

== Sources ==
- Fa, Darren; Finlayson, Clive (2006). The Fortifications of Gibraltar, 1068–1945. Gibraltar Museum. ISBN 9781846030161.
- Heathcote, Tony (1999). The British Field Marshals, 1736–1997: A Biographical Dictionary. Barnsley: Leo Cooper. ISBN 0-85052-696-5.
- Pankhurst, Richard (1968). An Introduction to the Economic History of Ethiopia. Addis Ababa: Haile Selassie I University. ISBN 978-0283354687.
- Rubenson, Sven (2003). The Survival of Ethiopian Independence. Hollywood: Tsehai. ISBN 978-0435942410.
- Stanley, Henry (1874). Coomassie and Magdala: the story of two British campaigns in Africa. New York: Harper & Brothers.
- Vibart, Henry (1894). Addiscombe: its heroes and men of note. Westminster: Archibald Constable. pp. 405–413. OL 23336661M.
- Wolseley, Garnet (1862). Narrative of the War with China in 1860. London: Longman Green Longman and Roberts. ISBN 1357525575.

Government offices
Preceded by The Earl of Elgin	Viceroy of India; 1863	Succeeded by Sir William Denison, acting
Military offices
Preceded by Sir William Mansfield	C-in-C, Bombay Army; 1865–1869	Succeeded by Sir Augustus Spencer
Preceded by The Lord Sandhurst	Commander-in-Chief, India; 1870–1876	Succeeded by Sir Frederick Haines
Government offices
Preceded by Sir Fenwick Williams	Governor of Gibraltar; 1876–1883	Succeeded by Sir John Adye
Honorary titles
Preceded by Sir Richard James Dacres	Constable of the Tower; 1887–1890	Succeeded by Sir Daniel Lysons
Preceded by Sir Richard James Dacres	Lord Lieutenant of the Tower Hamlets; 1887–1889	Office abolished
Peerage of the United Kingdom
New creation	Baron Napier of Magdala; 1868–1890	Succeeded by Robert William Napier
