= Frederick Haines =

British general and commander of British forces in India

Field Marshal Sir Frederick Haines GCB GCSI CIE
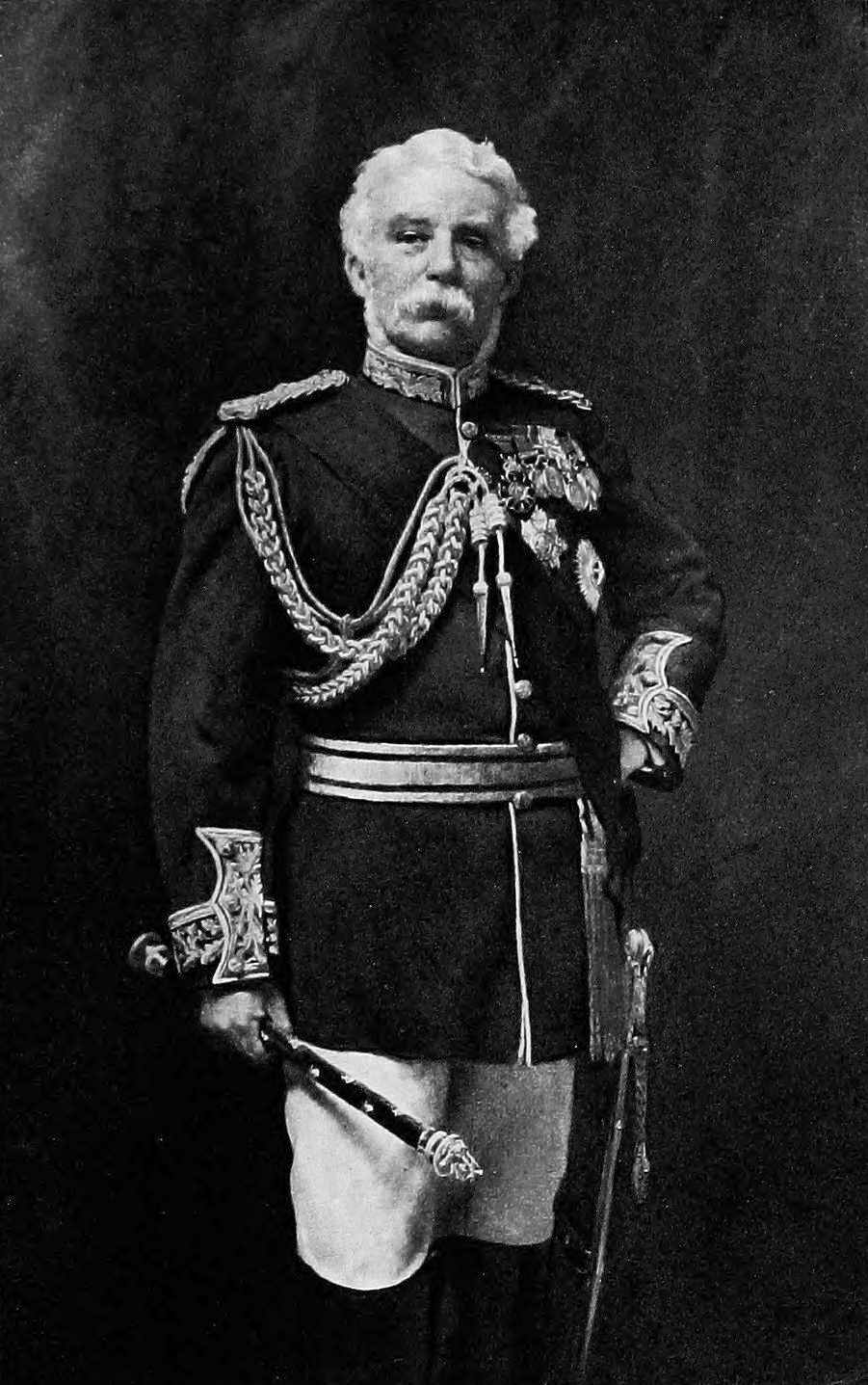
- Born: 10 August 1819; Parsonage Farm, Kirdford, Sussex
- Died: 11 June 1909 (aged 89); Pall Mall, London
- Burial place: Brompton Cemetery, London
- Military career
- Allegiance: United Kingdom
- Branch: British Army
- Service years: 1839–1881
- Rank: Field Marshal
- Commands: 8th Regiment of Foot; Mysore Division; Madras Army; Indian Army
- Conflicts: First Anglo-Sikh War; Second Anglo-Sikh War; Crimean War; Indian Rebellion; Second Anglo-Afghan War
- Awards: Knight Grand Cross of the Order of the Bath; Knight Grand Cross of the Order of the Star of India; Companion of the Order of the Indian Empire

Field Marshal Sir Frederick Paul Haines, GCB, GCSI, CIE (10 August 1819 – 11 June 1909) was a British Army officer. He fought in the First Anglo-Sikh War, in the Second Anglo-Sikh War and then in the Crimean War: during the latter conflict at the Battle of Inkerman, he held an important barrier on the post road guarding the approach to the 2nd Division camp for six hours. He served in India during the Indian Rebellion before becoming commanding officer of the 8th Regiment of Foot in the United Kingdom and then Commander of a Brigade in Ireland. He went on to be general officer commanding the Mysore Division of the Madras Army and then Quartermaster-General to the Forces in the United Kingdom. He returned to India to become Commander-in-Chief of the Madras Army in May 1871 and then Commander-in-Chief, India in April 1876: he commanded the forces in India during the Second Anglo-Afghan War and successfully argued for a large force being made available before mobilisation occurred, but once the war started the Governor-General of India, Lord Lytton, was inclined to by-pass Haines and deal direct with commanders in the field, causing friction between the two men.

== Military career ==
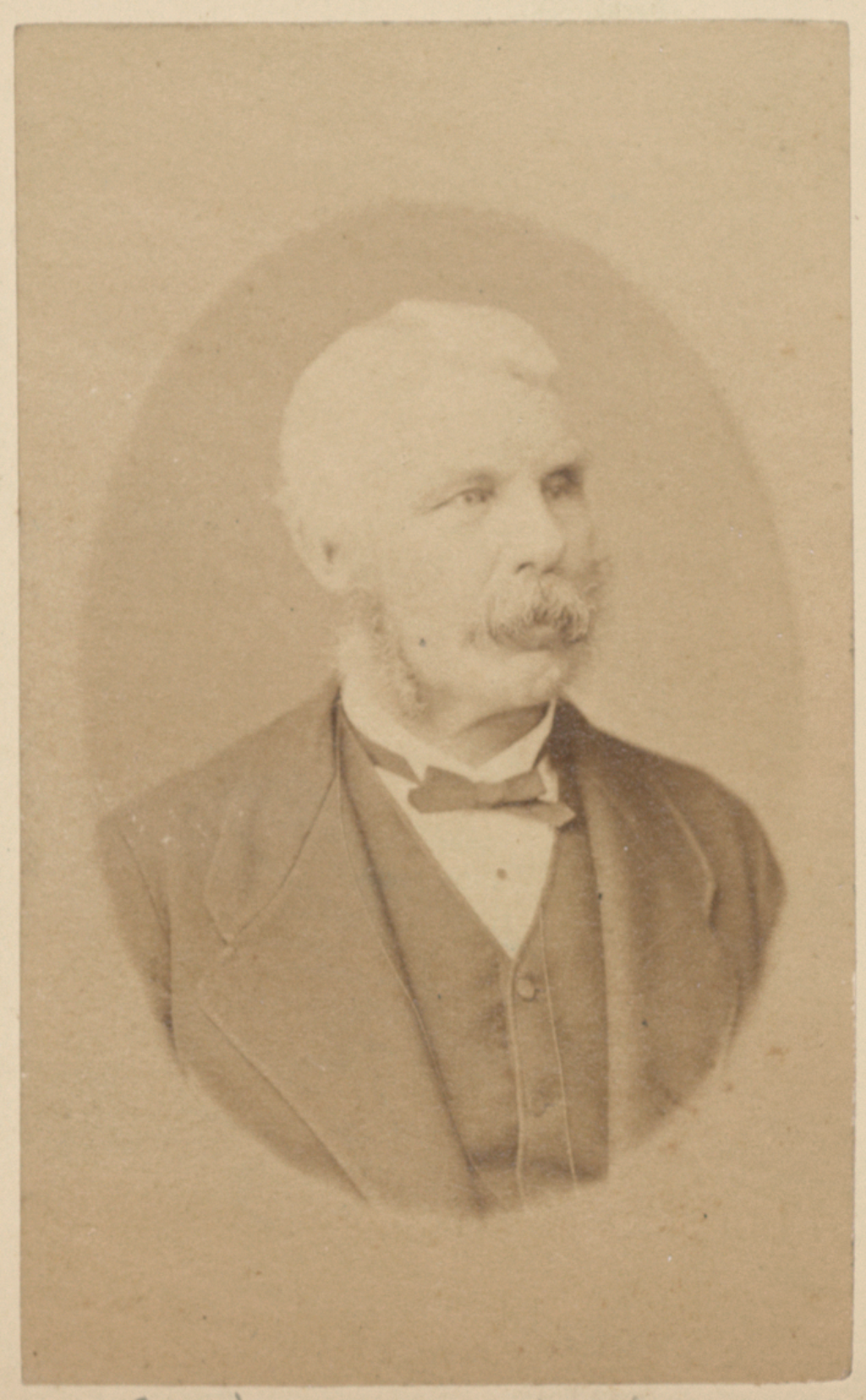
Sir Frederick Haines during the Second Anglo-Afghan War

Born on the 10 August 1819 in the Parsonage House, Kirdford, Sussex, the youngest of four children of Gregory Haines, a commissariat officer, and Harriet Haines (née Eldridge), Haines was educated at Midhurst Grammar School and the Royal Military College, Sandhurst before being commissioned into the 4th Regiment of Foot on 21 June 1839. He was promoted to lieutenant on 15 December 1840 and appointed aide-de-camp to General Sir Hugh Gough (his eldest brother's father-in-law) in 1843. Haines took part in the Battle of Mudki in December 1845 and the Battle of Ferozeshah (where he was severely wounded) in December 1845 during the First Anglo-Sikh War. Promoted to captain in the 10th Regiment of Foot on 16 May 1846, he exchanged to the 21st Royal North British Fusiliers on 31 March 1847 and then fought at the Battle of Ramnagar in November 1848, the Battle of Chillianwala in January 1849 and the Battle of Gujrat in February 1849 during the Second Anglo-Sikh War before being promoted to brevet major on 7 June 1849 and to brevet lieutenant colonel on 2 August 1850.

Haines served in the Crimean War taking part in the Battle of Alma in September 1854, the Battle of Balaclava in October 1854 and the Battle of Inkerman in November 1854, where as the senior officer, he held an important barrier on the post road guarding the approach to the 2nd Division camp for six hours.

Returning to England, Haines became assistant adjutant-general at Aldershot Command in February 1855 and, having been promoted to the substantive rank of lieutenant colonel on 24 April 1855 and to brevet colonel on 18 December 1855, he became military secretary to the Commander-in-Chief, Madras Army in India in June 1856 retaining that role through the Indian Rebellion in 1857. He became commanding officer of the 8th Regiment of Foot in the United Kingdom in October 1859 and Deputy Adjutant-General in Ireland in June 1862 before being given command of a brigade in Ireland with the temporary rank of brigadier-general in March 1864.

Promoted to brevet major-general on 25 November 1864, Haines returned to India to become general officer commanding the Mysore Division of the Madras Army in March 1865. He went on to be Quartermaster-General to the Forces in the United Kingdom in 1870 before returning to India again to be Commander-in-Chief of the Madras Army as well as a member of the Council of the Governor of Madras with the local rank of lieutenant general in May 1871.

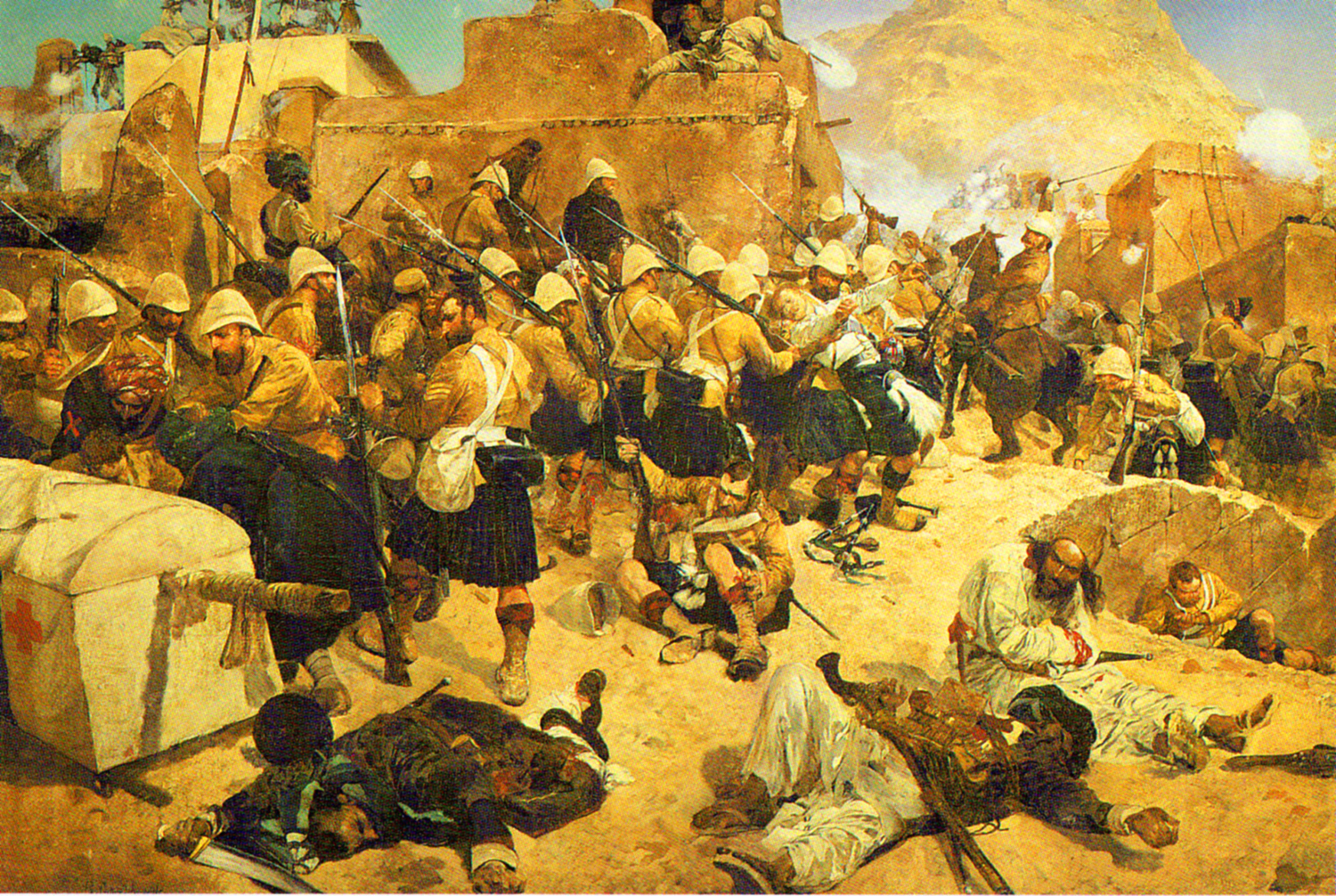
The Second Anglo-Afghan War during which Haines commanded the British forces

Promoted to the substantive rank of lieutenant general on 23 May 1873 and to the local rank of full general on 22 March 1876, Haines became Commander-in-Chief, India in April 1876, with promotion to brevet full general on 1 October 1877. He commanded the forces in India during the Second Anglo-Afghan War and successfully argued for a large force being made available before mobilisation occurred, but once the war started the Governor-General of India, Lord Lytton, was inclined to by-pass Haines and deal direct with commanders in the field, causing friction between the two men. Haines was offered a baronetcy for services to HM Government in India in 1880 but declined the honour due to his wife's failing health, presuming that it would be re-offered to him after her recovery. However, her health declined and she eventually died and the offer of the baronetcy was never renewed.

Returning to retirement in London in 1881, Haines was promoted to Field Marshal on 21 May 1890. He also became colonel of the 104th Bengal Fusiliers, subsequently of the 2nd Battalion of the Royal Munster Fusiliers and then of the Royal Scots Fusiliers. He died at his home at Pall Mall in London on 11 June 1909 and was buried in Brompton Cemetery, London.

== Family ==
In 1856 Haines married Charlotte Jane Sophia Miller; they had three sons.

== Honours ==
Haines' honours included:

- Knight Grand Cross of the Order of the Bath (GCB) - 2 June 1877 (KCB - 20 May 1871)
- Knight Grand Cross of the Order of the Star of India (GCSI) - 29 July 1879
- Companion of the Order of the Indian Empire (CIE) - 31 December 1877
- Order of the Medjidie, 5th Class (Ottoman Empire) - 2 March 1858

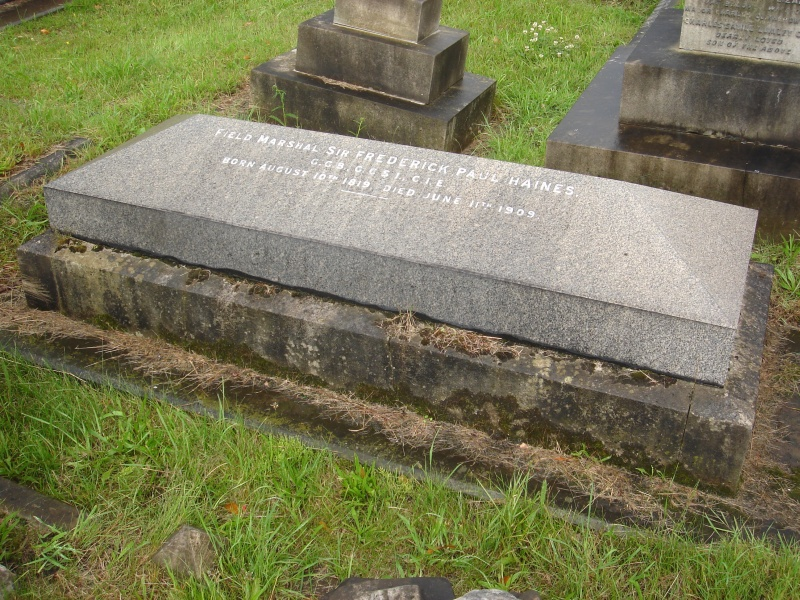
Funerary monument, Brompton Cemetery, London

== Sources ==
- Heathcote, Tony (1999). The British Field Marshals, 1736–1997: A Biographical Dictionary. Barnsley: Leo Cooper. ISBN 0-85052-696-5.
- Rait, Robert Sangster (1911). The Life of Field-Marshal Sir Frederick Paul Haines. London: Constable & Co. OCLC 3905931.

Military offices
Preceded by Sir James Grant	Quartermaster-General to the Forces; 1870–1871	Succeeded by Sir Charles Ellice
Preceded by William McCleverty	C-in-C, Madras Army; 1871–1876	Succeeded by Sir Neville Chamberlain
Preceded by The Lord Napier of Magdala	Commander-in-Chief, India; 1876–1881	Succeeded by Sir Donald Stewart
Preceded by George Dixon	Colonel of the 104th Regiment of Foot (Bengal Fusiliers); 1874–1881	Succeeded by Redesignated 2nd Battalion Royal Munster Fusiliers
Preceded by Regiment created	Colonel of the 2nd Battalion, Royal Munster Fusiliers; 1881–1890	Succeeded by William Richard Preston (entire regiment)
Preceded by Sir Frederick Hamilton	Colonel of the Royal Scots Fusiliers; 1890–1909	Succeeded by John Thomas Dalyell
