= William Mansfield, 1st Viscount Sandhurst =

British Liberal politician and colonial governor

The Right Honourable The Viscount Sandhurst GCSI GCIE GCVO PC
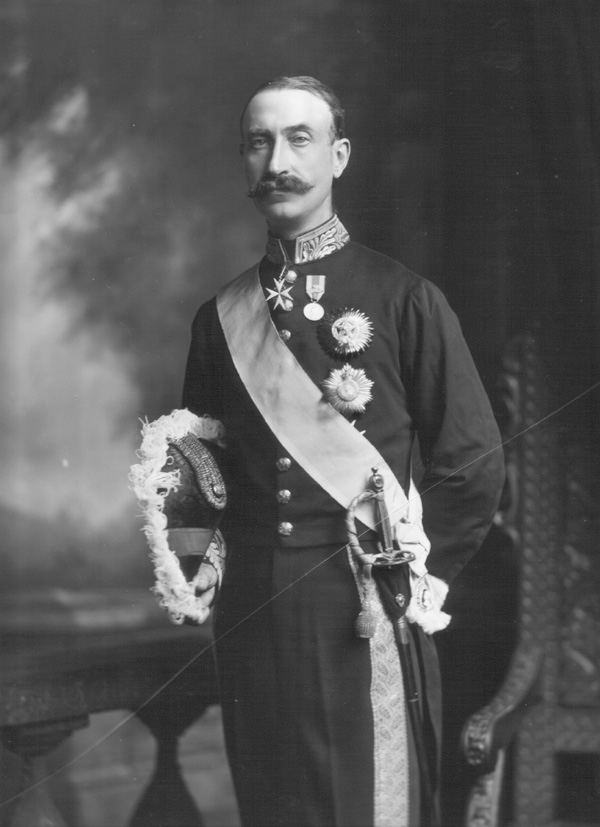

Lord Chamberlain of the Household
- In office 14 February 1912 – 2 November 1921
- Monarch: George V
- Prime Minister: H. H. Asquith; David Lloyd George
- Preceded by: The Earl Spencer
- Succeeded by: The Duke of Atholl

Governor of Bombay
- In office 1895–1900
- Monarch: Queen Victoria
- Preceded by: The Lord Harris
- Succeeded by: The Lord Northcote

Personal details
- Born: 21 August 1855
- Died: 2 November 1921 (aged 66)
- Party: Liberal
- Spouse(s): (1) Lady Victoria Spencer (1855–1906) (2) Eleanor Arnold (d. 1934)
- Parents: William Mansfield, 1st Baron Sandhurst (father); Margaret Fellowes (mother)

William Mansfield, 1st Viscount Sandhurst GCSI, GCIE, GCVO, PC (21 August 1855 – 2 November 1921) was a British Liberal politician and colonial governor. He was Governor of Bombay between 1895 and 1900 and Lord Chamberlain of the Household between 1912 and 1921.

== Background and early life ==
Mansfield was the son of William Mansfield, 1st Baron Sandhurst, and Margaret, daughter of Robert Fellowes, and a noted suffragist. He was educated at Rugby School. He served in the Coldstream Guards, achieving the rank of lieutenant.

== Political career ==
Mansfield succeeded his father as Baron Sandhurst in 1876, aged 20, and was entitled to a seat in the House of Lords from his 21st birthday a few months later. When the Liberals came to power under William Ewart Gladstone in 1880, he was appointed a Lord-in-waiting, a post he held until 1885 when the Liberals left office. He was Under-Secretary of State for War in Gladstone's brief 1886 administration and again from 1892 to 1895 under Gladstone and Lord Rosebery. In 1895 he was made Governor of Bombay, a post he held until February 1900. After he had stepped down, he was appointed an extra Knight Grand Commander of the Order of the Star of India (GCSI) on 9 March 1900.

Lord Sandhurst did not initially serve in the Liberal administrations headed by Sir Henry Campbell-Bannerman and H. H. Asquith but was sworn of the Privy Council in 1907. He did return to ministerial office in 1912 when Asquith appointed him Lord Chamberlain of the Household (succeeding his brother-in-law Lord Spencer). He continued in this post until his death in 1921, the last five years under the premiership of David Lloyd George. In 1917 he was made Viscount Sandhurst, of Sandhurst in the County of Berkshire.

According to the historian David Gilmour, Sandhurst was "regarded by his brother officers in the Coldstream Guards as ‘incurably dense’ [and] considered by officials in his presidency to be almost illiterate."

== Family ==
Lord Sandhurst married, firstly, Lady Victoria, daughter of Frederick Spencer, 4th Earl Spencer, on 20 July 1881. They had two children, who both died in infancy: The Honourable John Robert Mansfield (4 September 1882–5 September 1882) and the Honourable Elizabeth Mansfield (9 June 1884–17 October 1884).

After his first wife's death in March 1906 he married secondly Eleanor, younger daughter of Matthew Arnold and widow of Armine Wodehouse, on 5 July 1909. There were no children from this marriage.

Lord Sandhurst died in 1921, aged 66. The viscountcy became extinct on his death while the barony was inherited by his brother, John Mansfield. Lady Sandhurst died in December 1934.

== Arms ==
Coat of arms of William Mansfield, 1st Viscount Sandhurst

Crest
Out of an Eastern crown Argent a gryphon’s head Sable beaked Or between two branches of laurel Proper.
Escutcheon
Argent on a chevron embattled Azure between three maunches Sable an Eastern crown Or on a chief engrailed of the third a lion of the fourth combatant with a tiger cowed Proper.
Motto
Steadfast

Political offices
Preceded by The Earl of Listowel	Lord-in-waiting; 1880–1885	Succeeded by The Viscount Hawarden
Preceded by The Earl of Albemarle	Under-Secretary of State for War; 1886	Succeeded by The Lord Harris
Preceded by The Earl Brownlow	Under-Secretary of State for War; 1892–1895	Succeeded by The Lord Monkswell
Court offices
Preceded by The Earl Spencer	Lord Chamberlain; 1912–1921	Succeeded by The Duke of Atholl
Government offices
Preceded by The Lord Harris	Governor of Bombay; 1895–1900	Succeeded by The Lord Northcote
Peerage of the United Kingdom
New creation	Viscount Sandhurst; 1917–1921	Extinct
Preceded by William Mansfield	Baron Sandhurst; 1876–1921	Succeeded by John Mansfield
