= Tatya Tope =

Leader of the Indian War of Independence in 1857

General of the Peshwa's army
- In office 5 June – 6 December 1857
- Succeeded by: Rao Sahib

Personal details
- Born: Ramchandra Panduranga Yewalkar; 16 February 1814 Yeola, Nasik, Maratha Confederacy (present-day Nashik district, Maharashtra, India)
- Died: 18 April 1859 (aged 45) Sipri, Gwalior State, British India (present-day Shivpuri district, Madhya Pradesh, India)
- Cause of death: Execution by hanging

Military service
- Battles/wars: Indian Rebellion of 1857: Siege of Cawnpore; Capture of Kanpur; Battle of Kanpur; Siege of Charkhari; Battle of Tonk; Sack of Bundi

Tantia Tope (also spelled Tatya Tope, (Note: Some sources also spell the name as Tantia Tope or Tantia Topi) Marathi pronunciation: [t̪aːt̪ʲa ʈoːpe]; 16 February 1814 — 18 April 1859) was an Indian general in the Indian Rebellion of 1857 against the British East India Company.

== Early life ==
Bust of Tatya Tope at Nana Rao Sahab ll Park Bithoor, Kanpur

Born as Ramachandra Panduranga Yewalkar to a Marathi Deshastha Brahmin family, in Yeola, (near Nasik). A personal adherent of Nana Saheb of Bithoor, he progressed with the Gwalior contingent after the British reoccupied Kanpur (then known as Cawnpore) and forced General Windham to retreat from the city. Later on, Tantia Tope came to the relief of Rani Lakshmibai of Jhansi and with her seized the city of Gwalior. However, he was defeated by General Napier's British Indian troops at Ranod and after a further defeat at Sikar, he abandoned the campaign.

According to an official statement, Tantia Tope's father was Panduranga Yewalkar and his mother was Rukhma Bai. Tope was a Maraṭha Vashista Brahman by birth. In a government letter, he was said to be the minister of Baroda, while he was held identical to Nana Saheb in another communication. A witness at his trial described Tantia Tope as "a man of middling stature, with a wheat complexion and always wearing a white chukri-dar turban".

== Initial engagement at the Indian rebellion of 1857 ==
After the rebellion in (Kanpur) broke out on 5 June 1857, Nana Saheb became the leader of the freedom fighters. When the British forces at Cawnpore surrendered on 25 /June 1857, Nana was declared Peshwa in late June. After a defeat, Nana's troops had to withdraw to Bithur, after which Havelock crossed the Ganges and retreated to Awadh. Tantia Tope began to act in Nana Saheb's name from Bithur.

Tantia Tope was one of the leaders of the massacre of Cawnpore, which occurred on 27 June 1857, in which he was complicit in the massacre of 180 women and children following the British agreement to surrender. Afterwards, Tope held a good defensive position until he was driven out by the British force on 16 July 1857. Afterward, he was defeated by General Cyrill in the Second Battle of Cawnpore, which started on 19 November 1857 and continued for seventeen days. Tope and his army were defeated when the British counterattacked under Sir Colin Campbell. Tope and other rebels fled the scene and had to take shelter with the Rani of Jhansi, while aiding her as well.

== Clash with Colonel Holmes ==
Later on Tantia and Rao Saheb, after assisting Jhansi during the British assault successfully helped Rani Lakshmibai escape the attack. Together with Rani Lakshmibai, they took control of Gwalior Fort declaring Hindavi Swaraj (Hindu Self Rule) under the name of Nana Saheb Peshwa from Gwalior. After losing Gwalior to the British, Tope and Rao Saheb, nephew of Nana Saheb, fled to Rajputana (present-day Rajasthan). He was able to induce the army of Tonk to join him.

== Continued resistance ==
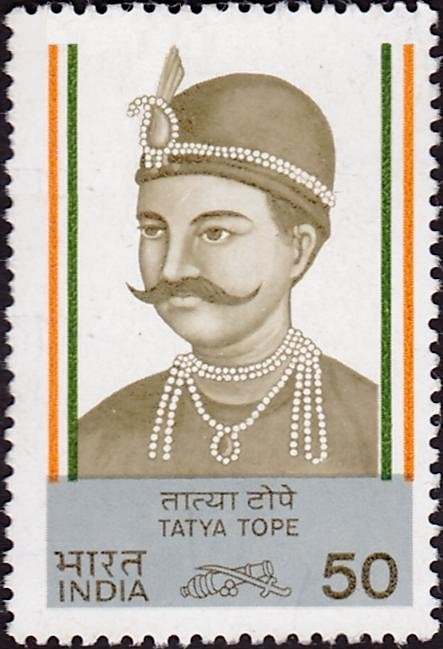
Tatya Tope on Indian Stamp

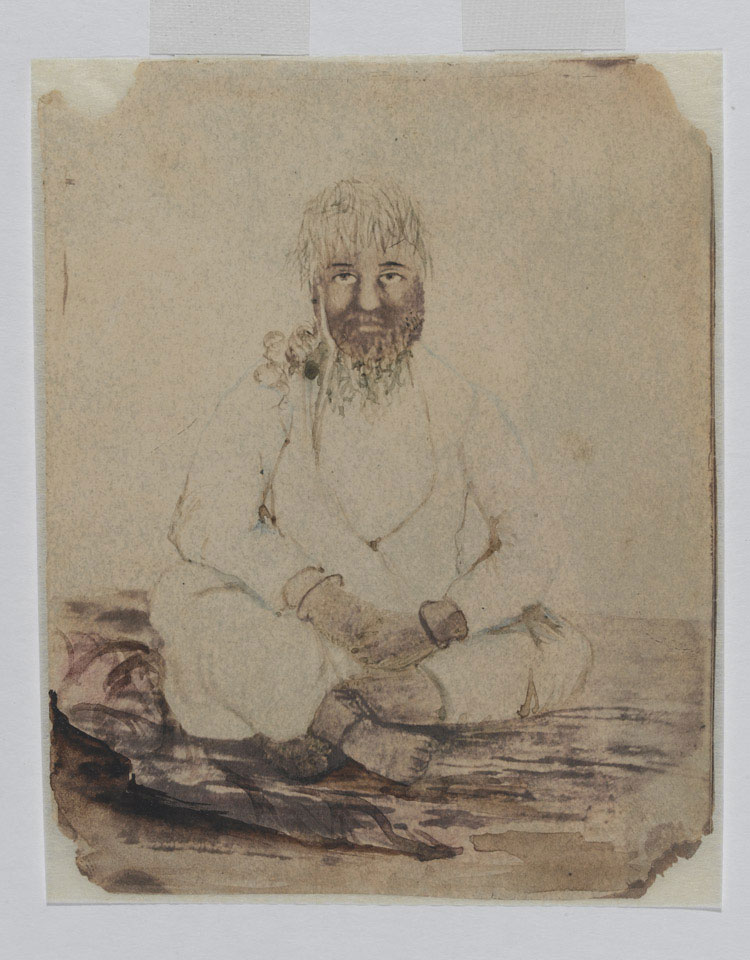
Pencil sketch of Tatya Tope made at Sipri in April 1859, just before his execution

Even after the Revolt of 1857 was put down by the British, Tantia Tope continued resistance as a guerrilla fighter in the jungles. He also defeated Ratan Singh in Siege of Charkhari. He induced the state forces to rebel against the Raja and was able to replace the artillery he had lost at the Banas River. Tope then took his forces towards Indore, but was pursued by the British, now commanded by General John Michel as he fled towards Sironj. Tope, accompanied by Rao Saheb, decided to divide their combined forces so that he could make his way to Chanderi with a bigger force, and Rao Saheb, on the other hand, with a smaller force to Jhansi. However, they combined again in October and suffered yet another defeat at Chhota Udaipur.

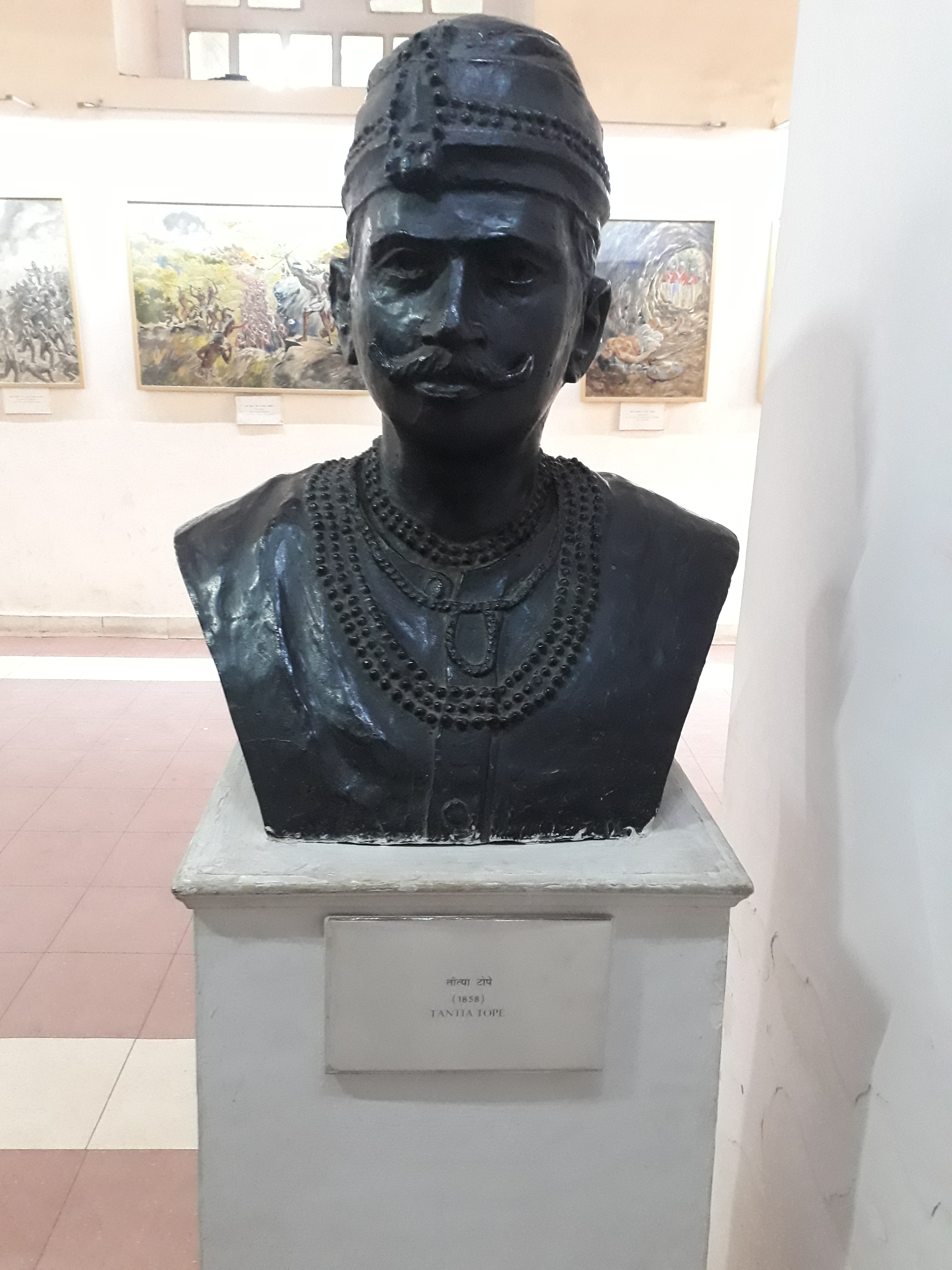
Tantia Tope bust in War Memorial Museum in Red fort

After Vinayak Damodar Savarkar's book on " 1857 - First War of Independence" another book entitled "The 1857" by Srinivas Balaji Herdikar was published by Satsahitya Prakasan in the year "1957". In its third edition Sri Srinivas Balaji Herdikar allotted a separate chapter with the title "Tantya Tope was not hanged". A similar title appeared in "Swatantra Bharat" a daily from Lucknow on April 13 by A.R.Gokhale, He wrote in his letter in that paper quite authentically that Tantya Tope was not hanged and that he miraculously escaped from captivity and that in his place, Narayan Rao Bhagvat, was hanged.

== Execution ==
Tope admitted the charges brought before him, but noted that he might be held accountable only before his master, the Peshwa. He was executed on 18 April 1859 at Sipri. Every year State Government and locals pay tribute to Tatya Tope on this day and organised Shaheed Mela.

== See also ==
- Banke Chamar
- Bahadur Shah II
- Begum Hazrat Mahal
- Azimulllah Khan
- Chetram Jatav
