= William Mansfield, 1st Baron Sandhurst =

British Army general (1819–1876)

General The Right Honourable The Lord Sandhurst GCB GCSI PC (Ire)
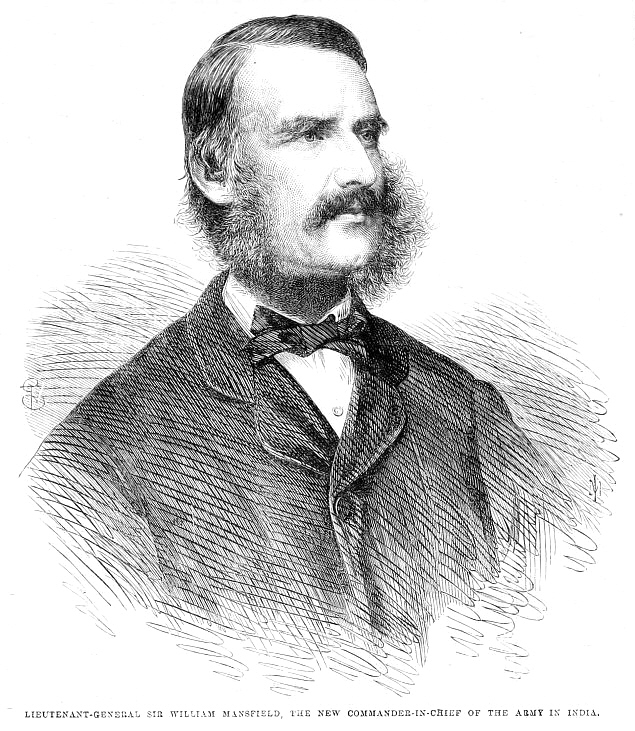
- 1865 portrait of Mansfield
- Born: William Rose Mansfield; 21 June 1819; Ruxley, Kent, United Kingdom
- Died: 23 June 1876 (aged 57); London, United Kingdom
- Burial place: Digswell church, Hertfordshire, United Kingdom
- Children: 5, including William and James
- Military career
- Allegiance: United Kingdom
- Branch: British Army
- Service years: 1835–1876
- Rank: General
- Commands: Bombay Army; Indian Army
- Awards: Baron Sandhurst; Knight Grand Cross of the Order of the Bath; Knight Grand Commander of the Order of the Star of India

General William Rose Mansfield, 1st Baron Sandhurst, GCB, GCSI, PC (Ire) (21 June 1819 – 23 June 1876) was a British military commander who served as Commander-in-Chief of India from 1865 to 1870.

In Bombay now Mumbai, there is local train station named after Baron Sandhurst. Sanhurst Road station in Central Line.

== Background and early life ==
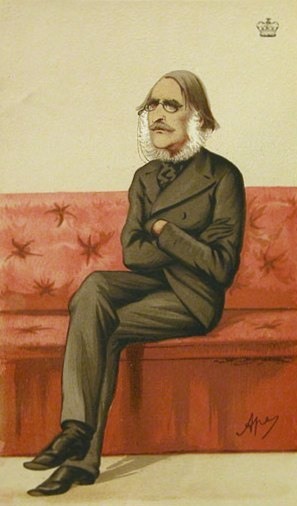
Vanity Fair caricature, 1874

Mansfield was born on 21 June 1819, in Ruxley, the fifth of the seven sons of John Mansfield of Diggeswell House in Hertfordshire, and his wife, Mary Buchanan Smith, daughter of General Samuel Smith of Baltimore in the United States. His grandfather was the prominent lawyer Sir James Mansfield, Solicitor General from 1780 to 1782 and in 1783 and Chief Justice of the Common Pleas from 1804 to 1814.

In 1854, he married Margaret Fellowes, who became a noted suffragist and spiritualist after his death. They had several children, among whom the eldest son, William, was a Liberal politician who served as Governor of Bombay and Lord Chamberlain of the Household of George V, before being ennobled.

== Military career ==
Mansfield was educated at Royal Military College, Sandhurst, and was commissioned into the 53rd Foot as an ensign in 1835. He was promoted to lieutenant on 31 August 1838 and to captain on 10 February 1843. He was mostly active in India and served in the Sutlej campaign of 1845 to 1846. Promoted to major on 3 December 1847, he commanded the 53rd Regiment in the Punjab from 1848 to 1849 and was employed in the Peshawar operations in 1851 and 1852, receiving promotion to lieutenant-colonel on 9 May 1851 and to colonel on 6 October 1854.

In 1855, during the Crimean War, Mansfield was appointed military adviser to the Ambassador at Constantinople Lord Stratford de Redcliff, and accompanied him to the Crimea. He then returned to India and served as Chief-of-Staff during the Indian Mutiny campaign from 1857 to 1859, initially with the local rank of major-general. His role during the Siege of Lucknow in November 1857 saw his appointment Knight Commander of the Order of the Bath (KCB) in March 1858. Promoted to major-general on 18 May 1858, he served as Commander-in-Chief of the Bombay Army from 1860 to 1865 and as Commander-in-Chief, India from 1865 to 1870. During this time, he was made Knight Grand Commander of the Order of the Star of India (GCSI) and subsequently Knight Grand Cross of the Order of the Bath (GCB). Mansfield was then Commander-in-Chief, Ireland from 1870 to 1875. He was promoted to full general on 23 May 1872.

In 1871, he was admitted to the Irish Privy Council and raised to the peerage as Baron Sandhurst, of Sandhurst in the County of Berkshire.

Sandhurst died in London on 23 June 1876, aged 57, and was buried at Digswell church, Hertfordshire. He was succeeded in the barony by his eldest son William, who was created Viscount Sandhurst in 1917. Upon the latter's death, the viscountcy became extinct, while the barony passed to Sandhurt's younger son John.

== Arms ==
Coat of arms of William Mansfield, 1st Baron Sandhurst

Crest
Out of an Eastern crown Argent a gryphon’s head Sable beaked Or between two branches of laurel Proper.
Escutcheon
Argent on a chevron embattled Azure between three maunches Sable an Eastern crown Or on a chief engrailed of the third a lion of the fourth combatant with a tiger cowed Proper.
Motto
Steadfast

Military offices
Preceded by Sir Hugh Rose	Commander-in-Chief, Bombay Army; 1860–1865	Succeeded by Sir Robert Napier
Preceded by Sir Hugh Rose	Commander-in-Chief, India; 1865–1870	Succeeded by The Lord Napier
Preceded by The Lord Strathnairn	Commander-in-Chief, Ireland; 1870–1875	Succeeded by Sir John Michel
Peerage of the United Kingdom
New creation	Baron Sandhurst; 1871–1876	Succeeded by William Mansfield
