= James Mansfield (English cricketer) =

English cricketer

The Honourable James William Mansfield (12 February 1862 – 17 June 1932) was an English cricketer who played first-class cricket for Marylebone Cricket Club and Cambridge University between 1883 and 1888. He was a right-handed middle-order batsman. He was born at Pune in India and died at Westminster, London.

Mansfield was the fourth son of the Crimean War and Indian Mutiny soldier Sir William Rose Mansfield, who was later created Baron Sandhurst. He was educated at Winchester College and Trinity College, Cambridge, graduating in 1884.

Mansfield made his first-class cricket debut while at Cambridge, playing in 1882 for "An England XI" in a match against the university side. In 1883 and 1884, he played regularly for the university team and appeared in both seasons in the University Match against Oxford University. He had limited success, but against the Orleans Club in the first-class game in 1883 he scored 117, and this was the highest score of his cricket career. After leaving Cambridge, he played a couple of times for MCC in matches against the university team.

Mansfield became a wine merchant in the city of London in partnership with the MP Sir Ernest Hatch, and was managing director and later chairman of Hatch Mansfield & Co. He died in Westminster Hospital after a heart attack; he was not married.
