= Colin Campbell, 1st Baron Clyde =

British Army officer and field marshal (1792–1863)

Field Marshal The Right Honourable The Lord Clyde GCB KSI
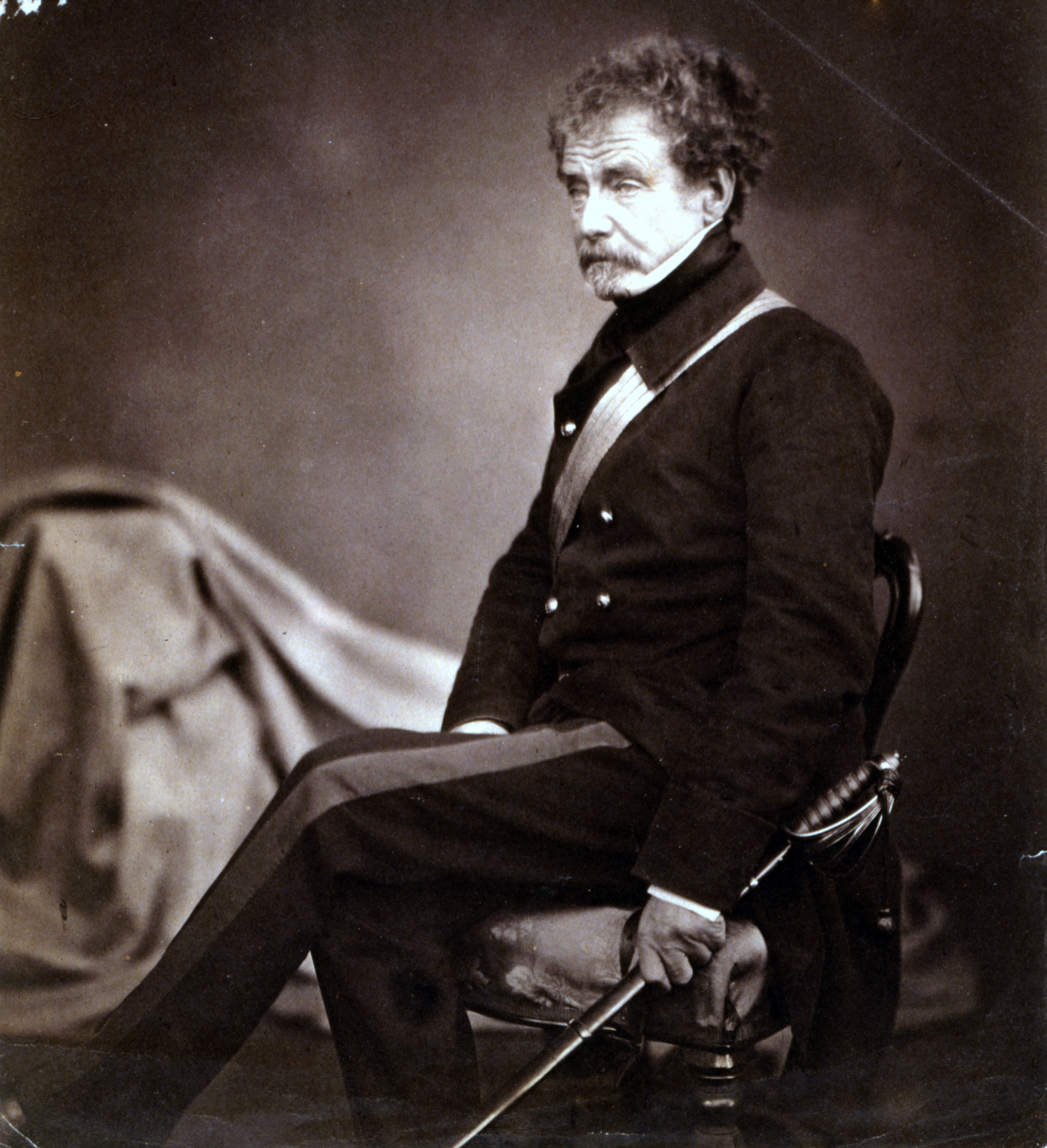
- Lord Clyde in 1855
- Born: 20 October 1792; Glasgow, Scotland
- Died: 14 August 1863 (aged 70); Chatham, Kent, England
- Burial place: Westminster Abbey
- Military career
- Allegiance: United Kingdom/British Empire
- Branch: British Army
- Service years: 1808–1860
- Rank: Field Marshal
- Commands: Highland Brigade; Commander-in-Chief of India
- Conflicts: Peninsular War; War of 1812; First Opium War; Second Anglo-Sikh War; Crimean War; Indian Mutiny
- Awards: Knight Grand Cross of the Order of the Bath; Knight Commander of the Order of the Star of India

Field Marshal Colin Campbell, 1st Baron Clyde, GCB, KSI (20 October 1792 – 14 August 1863) was a British Army officer. After serving in the Peninsular War and the War of 1812, he commanded the 98th Regiment of Foot during the First Opium War and then commanded a brigade during the Second Anglo-Sikh War. He went on to command the Highland Brigade at the Battle of Alma and with his "thin red line of Highlanders" he repulsed the Russian attack on Balaclava during the Crimean War. At an early stage of the Indian Mutiny, he became Commander-in-Chief, India and, in that role, he relieved and then evacuated Lucknow and, after attacking and decisively defeating Tatya Tope at the Second Battle of Cawnpore, captured Lucknow again. Whilst still commander-in-chief he dealt with the "White Mutiny" among East India Company troops, and organised the army sent east in the Second Opium War.

== Early life ==
Campbell was born Colin Macliver, the eldest of the four children of John Macliver, a cabinetmaker in Glasgow, and Agnes Macliver (née Campbell). His mother and one of his twin sisters died while he was still a boy. His only brother was killed fighting in the Peninsular War. After he was educated at the Glasgow Grammar School, his uncle, Major John Campbell, took over his care and sent him to the Royal Military and Naval Academy at Gosport.

The most oft-quoted story explaining Campbell's name change is that upon Colin's entry into the 9th (East Norfolk) Regiment of Foot as an ensign in 1808, his uncle presented him to the Duke of York, who assumed the boy's surname was Campbell and had him enlisted in the Army under that name. This story was first promulgated during the Crimean War. The press were fascinated to find why he had changed his name, and rumours abounded that he was in fact the illegitimate son of Major Campbell, so Peter Macliver, a journalist and Colin's cousin, invented the story about the Duke of York. Not only was it highly unusual for an ensign to meet the commander-in-chief, the Duke of York, but Campbell was on the Isle of Wight, not in London when commissioned. Furthermore, General Robert Brownrigg, colonel of the regiment of the 9th Foot, wrote to the Duke of York prior to Campbell's commission, referring to the fifteen-year-old boy as "Mr Colin Campbell". Evidently, Campbell changed his name before being gazetted.

== Military career ==
=== Junior officer ===
Campbell was commissioned as an ensign in the 9th Regiment of Foot on 26 May 1808. His first experience of war was under Sir Arthur Wellesley at the Battle of Vimeiro on 21 August 1808 during the Peninsular War. His battalion remained in Portugal and served under Sir John Moore during his foray into Spain, and subsequent retreat to Corunna. His battalion was not engaged at the Battle of Corunna in January 1809, but remained in reserve. Promoted to lieutenant on 15 July 1809, he took part in the disastrous Walcheren Campaign in Autumn 1809 and contracted malaria there.

Campbell was posted to Gibraltar in 1810 and fought at the Battle of Barrosa in March 1811, taking command of the 9th Foot's flank companies as the senior officer not hors de combat. His bravery was noted by General Sir Thomas Graham. Serving in his battalion's light company, he fought at the Battle of Vitoria in June 1813 and at the Siege of San Sebastián. Here, in the first assault on 25 July 1813, he led the forlorn hope and was wounded twice while leading a storming party. He led the 9th Foot's light company at the Battle of the Bidassoa in October 1813 where he was wounded for the third time. He was promoted to captain in the 7th Battalion 60th (Royal American) Regiment on 3 November 1813. Sent to Halifax, Nova Scotia, he was too late to see action in the War of 1812 and soon returned to Europe suffering from his wounds. Due to the contraction of the army after Battle of Waterloo, the number of Royal American battalions was cut back drastically. To avoid being put on half-pay Campbell transferred to the 21st Royal North British Fusiliers on 26 November 1818. The regiment was sent first to Barbados and then to Demerara, where Campbell became aide-de-camp to the governor. His part in quelling the slave rebellion in Demerara in August 1823 is hazy. He is not recorded as joining in the reprisals against slaves pursued by his commanding officer, Lieutenant-Colonel Leahy, but he was on the court-martial which sentenced Reverend John Smith, the suspected instigator of the revolt, to death. He purchased his majority on 26 November 1825.

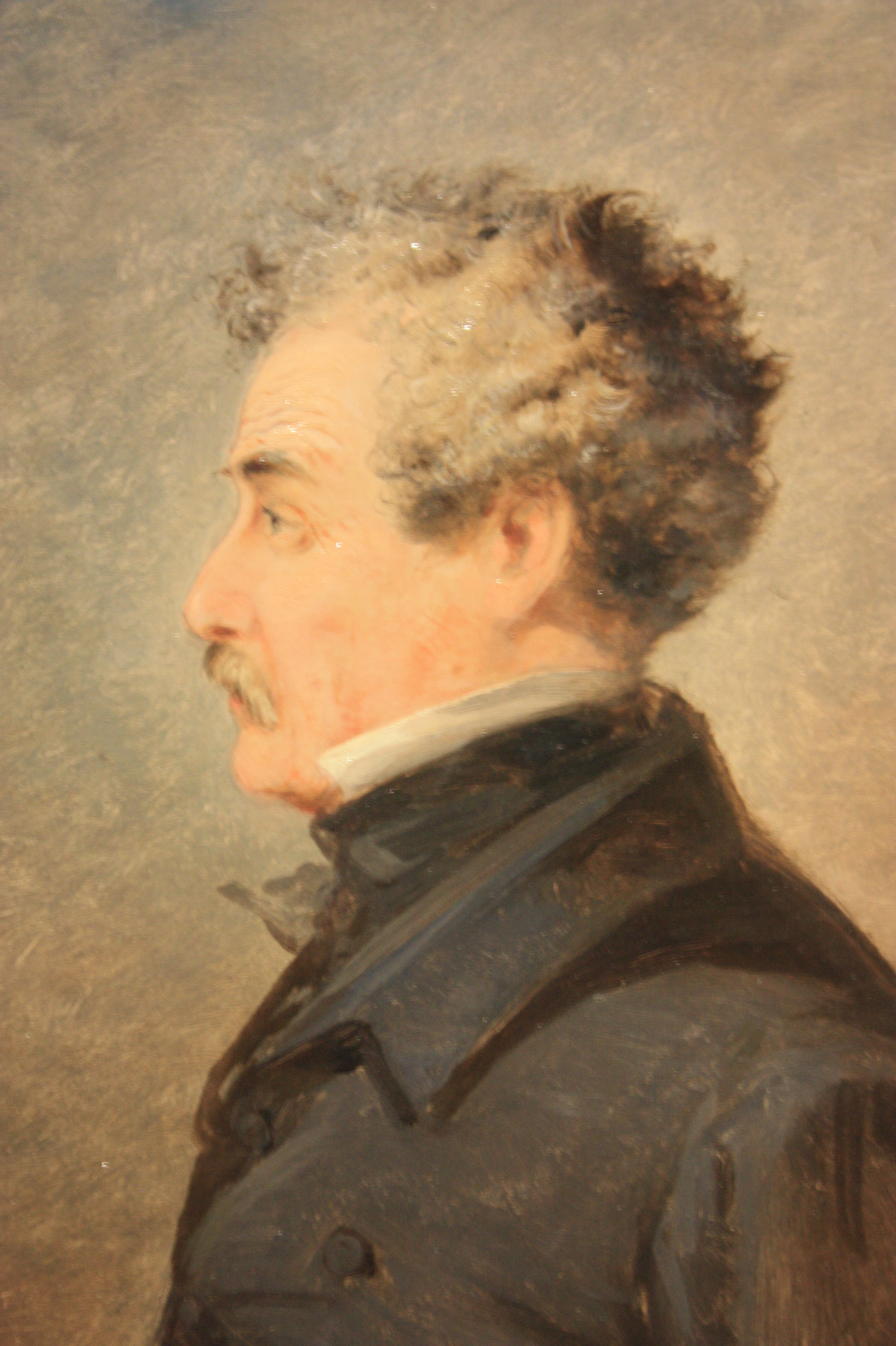
Colin Campbell by Thomas Jones Barker 1860

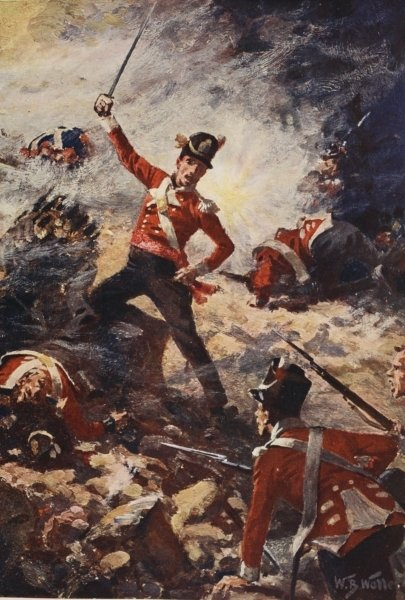
Campbell leading the 'forlorn hope' at the Siege of San Sebastián, 1813.

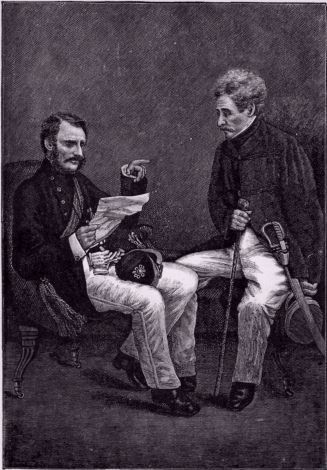
Colin Campbell (right) with William Mansfield, 1st Baron Sandhurst

=== Commands ===
His regiment returned to England and in 1828 was posted to Ireland. From late 1830 they were called upon to police the Irish Tithe War. Campbell purchased an unattached lieutenant-colonelcy on 26 October 1832 Campbell became commanding officer of the 9th Regiment of Foot on 8 May 1835 but then exchanged to become commanding officer of the 98th Regiment of Foot on 19 June 1835 and commanded that regiment at the Battle of Chinkiang in July 1842 during the First Opium War. Promoted to colonel on 23 December 1842, he became commandant of Hong Kong at the end of that year. He was appointed an aide-de-camp to the Queen on 23 December 1842 and a Companion of the Order of the Bath on 24 December 1842.

Campbell was given command of a brigade of British troops in Lahore in British India in 1847. He led his brigade at the Battle of Ramnagar in November 1848, and a division at the Battle of Chillianwala in January 1849 and at the decisive Battle of Gujrat in February 1849 during the Second Anglo-Sikh War. He was appointed Knight Commander of the Order of the Bath on 5 June 1849. After defusing a local mutiny of native troops at Rawalpindi, he was then posted to Peshawar in August 1849. Lord Dalhousie, Governor-General of India, requested Campbell lead increasing punitive expeditions against Pathan tribesmen. Finally, when Dalhousie asked Campbell to mount an invasion of the Swat Valley, Campbell resigned in disgust.

In 1854 Campbell was appointed Colonel of the 67th Regiment of Foot and subsequently of the 93rd Regiment of Foot.

=== Crimean War ===
In early 1854, shortly after the Crimean War broke out, Campbell accepted the command of the Highland Brigade. He was promoted to brevet brigadier-general on 21 February 1854 and to major-general on 20 June 1854. The Highland Brigade distinguished itself at the Battle of Alma in September 1854 and, with his "thin red line of Highlanders", Campbell repulsed the Russian attack on Balaclava in October 1854. He was promoted to the local rank of lieutenant general on 23 January 1855 and advanced to Knight Grand Cross of the Order of the Bath on 5 July 1855. When the Duke of Cambridge returned to England, Campbell took command of the 1st Division (Guards and Highland brigades) and commanded the Division at the Battle of the Great Redan in September 1855. Promoted to the local rank of full general on 28 December 1855 and the substantive rank of lieutenant general on 4 June 1856, he remained in the Crimea hoping to take overall command, but when General Sir William Codrington was appointed instead, he returned home in a huff. Prince Albert suggested the army in the Crimea be split into two corps d'armee, and Campbell be given one. Lord Panmure requested Queen Victoria ask Campbell return to command one of these corps, and Campbell agreed. However, by the time he had returned, the war was virtually over. He commanded South-Eastern District from July to September 1856. For his services in the Crimean War, he was awarded the Grand Cross of the Sardinian Order of Saints Maurice and Lazarus on 11 August 1856 and the Turkish Order of the Medjidie, 1st Class, on 2 March 1858. The Board of Directors of the East India Company also granted Campbell an annuity (a life-long annual payment) of £2,000 on 9 June 1858.

=== Commander-in-Chief of India ===
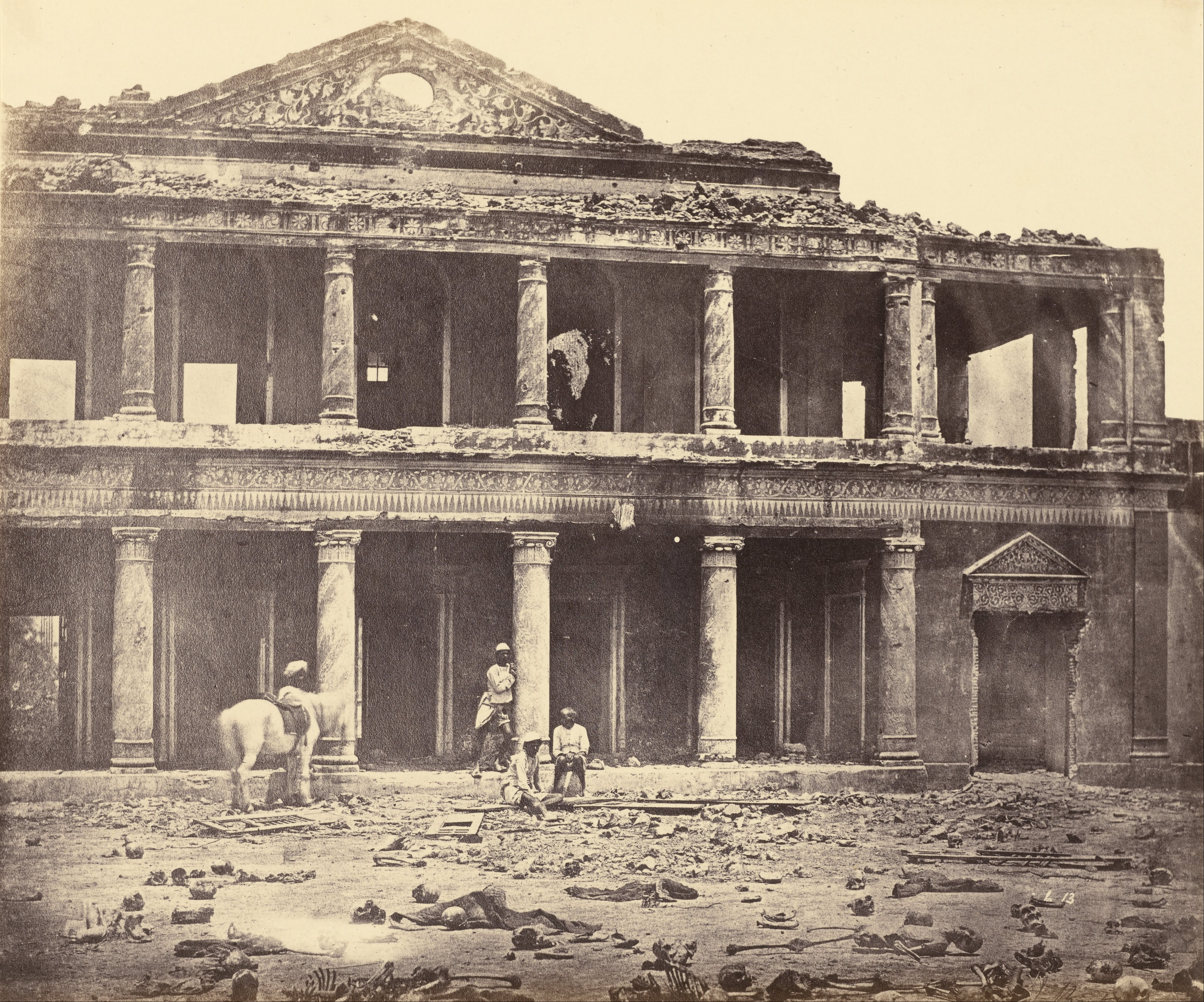
Interior of the Sikandar Bagh after the Slaughter of 2,000 Rebels by the 93rd Highlanders and 4th Punjab Regiment. First Attack of Sir Colin Campbell in November 1857, Lucknow. Albumen silver print, by Felice Beato, 1858.

On 11 July 1857, at an early stage in the Indian Mutiny, Lord Palmerston offered Campbell the command of all British forces in India. Promoted to the local rank of full general in India the same day, he left England the next day and reached Calcutta in August 1857. He relieved and then evacuated Lucknow in November 1857 and, after attacking and decisively defeating Tantia Tope at the Second Battle of Cawnpore in December 1857, he captured Lucknow again in March 1858. He was promoted to the substantive rank of full general on 14 May 1858 and raised to the peerage as Baron Clyde, of Clydesdale in Scotland on 3 August 1858. In Autumn 1858, faced with a further mutiny by the East India Company's European troops, who had not received their enlistment bounties, he used British troops to enforce discipline until the British Cabinet agreed to some concessions. He continued in charge of the operations in India until all aspects of the revolt had died away and then returned to England in June 1860.

== Retirement and memorials ==
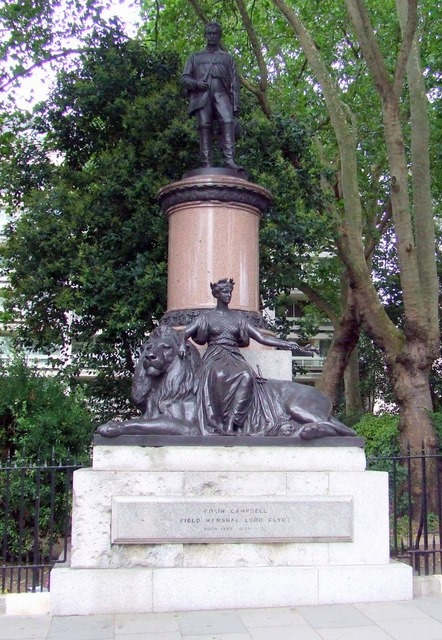
Statue of Lord Clyde in Waterloo Place, London

In retirement he lived at 10 Berkeley Square in London. Promoted to field marshal on 9 November 1862, he died at Chatham on 14 August 1863, and was buried in Westminster Abbey. His monument was sculpted by Thomas Gaffin.

A statue of Campbell by Carlo Marochetti was erected in Waterloo Place in London in 1867. Another statue of him by John Foley was erected in George Square in Glasgow the following year.

There is a public house in Kilburn High Road, North West London, named after Sir Colin Campbell of the same name. It is an Irish pub but the building has operated as a tavern (in his name) for more than 100 years.

== Family ==
Campbell never married, or fathered any children.

== Coat of arms ==
Coat of arms of Colin Campbell, 1st Baron Clyde
Crest On a mural crown or, a swan sable. Escutcheon Or, on a fesse gules, a mural crown of the field. Supporters Dexter, a soldier of the 42nd (the Royal Highland) Regiment of Foot; sinister, a soldier of the 93rd (Highland) Regiment of Foot, each habited, accoutred, and holding in the exterior hand a musket proper. Motto Be Mindful

== General sources ==
- Greenwood, Adrian (2015). Victoria's Scottish Lion: The Life of Colin Campbell, Lord Clyde. UK: History Press. p. 496. ISBN 978-0-75095-685-7.
- Heathcote, Tony (1999). The British Field Marshals, 1736–1997: A Biographical Dictionary. Barnsley: Leo Cooper. ISBN 0-85052-696-5.
- Wheatley, Henry (2011). London Past and Present: Its History, Associations, and Traditions. Cambridge University Press. ISBN 978-1108028080.

Military offices
Preceded by John Frederick Ewart	Colonel of the 67th (the South Hampshire) Regiment of Foot; 1854–1858	Succeeded by Francis John Davies
Preceded by Edward Parkinson	Colonel of the 93rd (Sutherland Highlanders) Regiment of Foot; 1858–1860	Succeeded by William Sutherland
Preceded by The Earl of Strafford	Colonel of the Coldstream Guards; 1860–1863	Succeeded by Sir William Gomm
New post	GOC South-Eastern District; July 1856 – September 1856	Succeeded by Sir Frederick Love
Preceded by Sir Patrick Grant	Commander-in-Chief, India; 1857–1861	Succeeded by The Lord Strathnairn
Peerage of the United Kingdom
New creation	Baron Clyde; 1858–1863	Extinct
