= Commander-in-Chief, India =

Supreme commander of the Indian Army before 1950

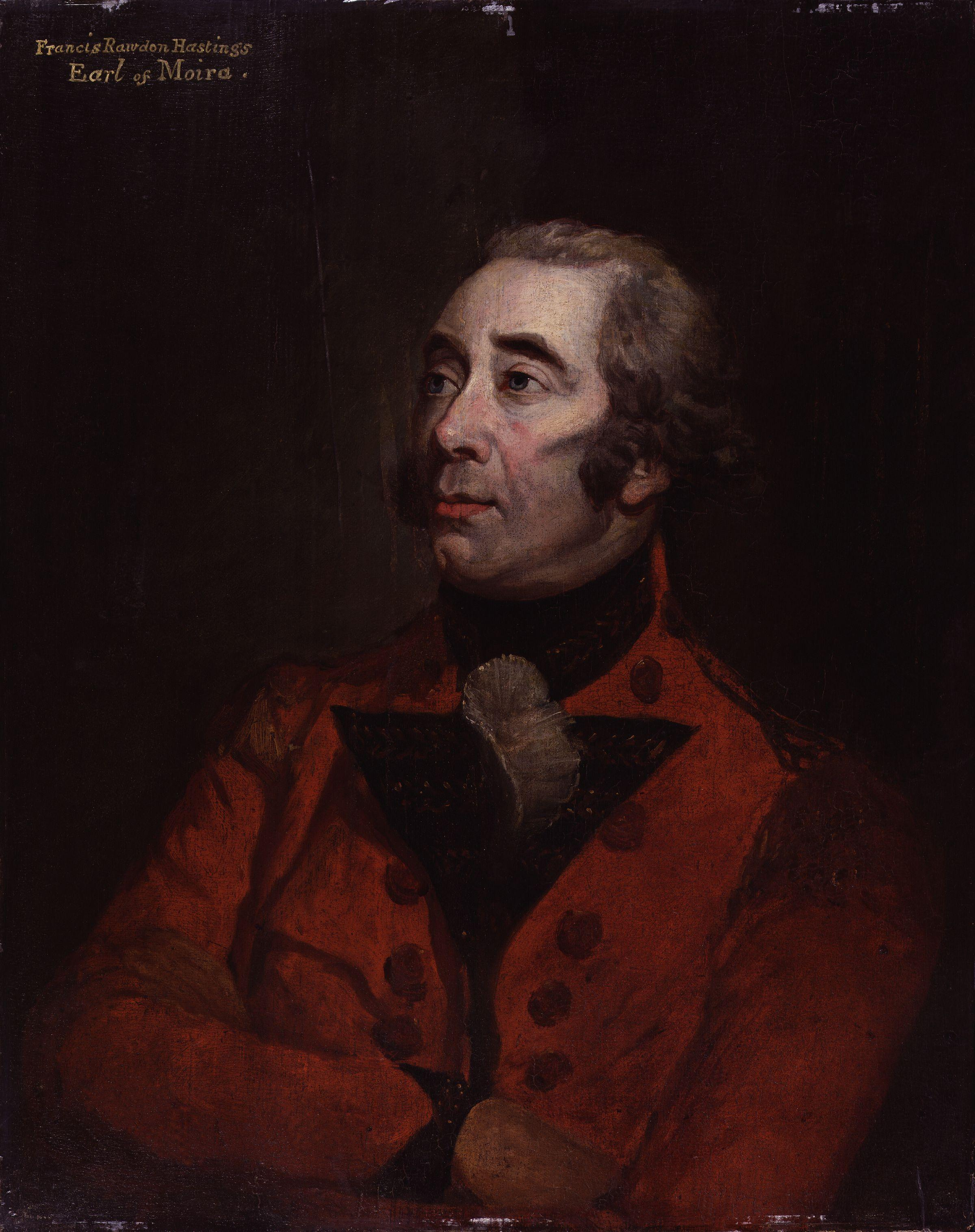
- Longest serving General The Earl of Moira; October 1813 – January 1823
- British Indian Army
- Status: Senior-most officer of the Indian Army
- Reports to: Governor-General of India
- Residence: Flagstaff House
- Seat: GHQ India
- Term length: No fixed term
- First holder: Major general Stringer Lawrence
- Final holder: FM Sir Claude Auchinleck
- Abolished: 15 August 1947
- Succession: Commanders-in-Chief of the Indian Army and Pakistan Army
- Unofficial names: Commander-in-Chief in or of India

During the period of the Company and Crown rule in India, the Commander-in-Chief, India (often "Commander-in-Chief in or of India") was the supreme commander of the Indian Army from 1833 to 1947. The Commander-in-Chief and most of his staff were based at GHQ India, and liaised with the civilian Governor-General of India. Following the partition of India in 1947 and the creation of the independent dominions of India and Pakistan, the post was abolished. It was briefly replaced by the position of Supreme Commander of India and Pakistan before the role was abolished in November 1948. Subsequently, the role of Commander-in-Chief was merged into the offices of the Commanders-in-Chief of the independent Indian Army and Pakistan Army, respectively, before becoming part of the office of the President of India from 1950 and of the Commander-in-Chief of the Pakistan Army from 1947.

Prior to independence, the official residence of the Commander-in-Chief, India, was Flagstaff House, Delhi, which later became the residence of the first prime minister of India, Jawaharlal Nehru, and was renamed Teen Murti Bhavan (Teen Murti House). It is now a museum.

This is a list of people who were the military Commander-in-Chief, India until 1947. The rank and title are the final ones for the officer's career and not necessarily applicable to his tenure as Commander-in-Chief in India.

P.R. Cadell wrote an article correcting and elaborating on the early commanders-in-chief of the East India Company's forces in the Journal of the Society for Army Historical Research in 1944.

== List of Commanders-in-Chief ==
Commanders-in-Chief have been:

† denotes people who died in office.

=== Commanders-in-Chief of India, 1801–1857 ===
No.	Portrait	Commander-in-Chief	Took office	Left office	Time in office	Notes
1	Sir James Craig	Lieutenant General; Sir James Craig (1748–1812)	February 1801	March 1801	1 month	Officiating.
2	Gerard Lake	General; Gerard Lake (1744–1808)	March 1801	July 1805	4 years, 4 months	Conducted a campaign with a string of victories that gave the British control of Northern India, Delhi and the Mughal emperor but failed to take Bhurtpore. Improved the Indian Army by making all arms, infantry, cavalry and artillery, more mobile and more manageable.
3	The Marquess Cornwallis	General; The Marquess Cornwallis (1738–1805)	July 1805	October 1805	3 months	With Sir Arthur Wellesley, he supervised the Second Anglo-Maratha War against the Sindhia and the Holkar.
(2)	Gerard Lake	General; Gerard Lake (1744–1808)	October 1805	1806	0–1 years	Reappointment following death of The Marquess Cornwallis. Upon Cornwallis' death, Lake pursued the Holkar to the Punjab. The Holkar capitulated at Amritsar in December 1805.
4	John Simcoe	Lieutenant General; John Simcoe (1752–1806)	1806	26 October 1806 †	0 years	Appointed to post in England in late 1805, but died before departing for India and replaced by Lake.
(2)	The Lord Lake	General; The Lord Lake (1744–1808)	1806	October 1807	0–1 years	Reappointment following death of John Simcoe, who died after accepting the appointment in England.
5	Sir George Hewett	Lieutenant General; Sir George Hewett (1750–1840)	October 1807	December 1807	2 months	Transformed Meerut into a British stronghold that became a launching point for future military campaigns into northern India.
6	Forbes Champagné	Lieutenant General; Forbes Champagné (1754–1816)	December 1807	January 1811	3 years, 1 month	Officiating.
7	Sir George Nugent	General; Sir George Nugent (1757–1849)	January 1811	October 1813	2 years, 9 months	–
8	The Earl of Moira	General; The Earl of Moira (1754–1826)	October 1813	January 1823	9 years, 3 months	1st Marquess of Hastings from 1816; Oversaw British forces in the Gurkha War; conquered the Marathas; repaired the Mogul canals in Delhi; instituted educational reforms.
9	Sir Edward Paget	Lieutenant General; Sir Edward Paget (1775–1849)	January 1823	October 1825	2 years, 9 months	–
10	The Baron Combermere	General; The Baron Combermere (1773–1865)	October 1825	January 1830	4 years, 3 months	1st Viscount Combermere from 1827. Captured Bhurtpore (which Lake had failed to do) in 1824.
11	The Earl of Dalhousie	General; The Earl of Dalhousie (1770–1838)	January 1830	January 1832	2 years	Began the British suppression of the Thuggee murder-cults.
12	Sir Edward Barnes	General; Sir Edward Barnes (1776–1838)	January 1832	October 1833	1 year, 9 months	Constructed the military road between Colombo and Kandy, made the first census of the population, and introduced coffee cultivation.
13	Lord William Bentinck	General; Lord William Bentinck (1774–1839)	October 1833	March 1835	1 year, 5 months	Suppressed the Hindu custom of sati. Reappointed in April 1834.
14	Sir James Watson	General; Sir James Watson (1772–1862)	March 1835	September 1835	6 months	Established the famous police organisation known as the "Thuggee and Dacoity Department" within the Government of India.
15	Sir Henry Fane	General; Sir Henry Fane (1778–1840)	September 1835	December 1839	4 years, 3 months	–
16	Sir Jasper Nicolls	General; Sir Jasper Nicolls (1778–1849)	December 1839	August 1843	3 years, 8 months	Officiating.
17	Hugh Gough	Field Marshal; Hugh Gough (1779–1869)	August 1843	May 1849	5 years, 9 months	1st Baron Gough from 1846; Defeated the Mahrattas at Maharajpur. Conducted operations against the Sikhs and won the battles of Mudki, Ferozeshah and Sobraon. Soon after, the Sikhs surrendered at Lahore.
18	Sir Charles James Napier	General; Sir Charles James Napier (1782–1853)	May 1849	December 1851	2 years, 7 months	Conquered Sindh and made it part of Bombay Presidency.
19	Sir William Gomm	Field Marshal; Sir William Gomm (1784–1875)	December 1851	January 1856	4 years, 1 month	–
20	George Anson	Major general George Anson (1797–1857)	January 1856	27 May 1857 †	1 year, 4 months	Outbreak of the Indian Rebellion of 1857. Died of cholera during his march against the Indian Rebellion at Delhi.
21	Sir Patrick Grant	Lieutenant general Sir Patrick Grant (1804–1895)	June 1857	August 1857	2 months	Directed operations against the Indian Rebellion, sending forces under Havelock and Outram for the relief of Cawnpore and Lucknow, until the arrival of Sir Colin Campbell from England.
22	Sir Colin Campbell	General; Sir Colin Campbell (1792–1863)	August 1857	4 June 1861	3 years, 10 months	1st Baron Clyde from 1858; Abandoned then recaptured Lucknow. Supervised military operations in Oudh until the Indian Rebellion had been subdued.

=== Commanders-in-Chief of India, 1861–1947 ===
No.	Portrait	Commander-in-Chief	Took office	Left office	Time in office	Notes
1	Sir Hugh Rose	Lieutenant general Sir Hugh Rose (1801–1885)	4 June 1861	23 March 1865	3 years, 292 days	Improved discipline and enabled the amalgamation of the East India Company's army into the Queen's army to be carried out.
2	Sir William Mansfield	General; Sir William Mansfield (1819–1876)	23 March 1865	9 April 1870	5 years, 17 days	Prior to his appointment, Mansfield served in the Sutlej campaign, commanded the 53rd Regiment in the Punjab, and was part of Peshawar operations in the northwest frontier.
3	The Lord Napier of Magdala	General; The Lord Napier of Magdala (1810–1890)	9 April 1870	10 April 1876	6 years, 1 day	He did much to benefit the army and to encourage good shooting.
4	Sir Frederick Haines	General; Sir Frederick Haines (1819–1909)	10 April 1876	8 April 1881	4 years, 363 days	–
5	Sir Donald Stewart	General; Sir Donald Stewart (1824–1900)	8 April 1881	28 November 1885	4 years, 234 days	–
6	Sir Frederick Roberts	Lieutenant general Sir Frederick Roberts (1832–1914)	28 November 1885	8 April 1893	7 years, 131 days	1st Baron Roberts of Kandahar and Colonel of the 5th Gorkha Rifles (Frontier Force)
7	Sir George White	General; Sir George White (1835–1912)	8 April 1893	20 March 1898	4 years, 346 days	–
8	Sir Charles Nairne	General; Sir Charles Nairne (1836–1899)	20 March 1898	4 November 1898	229 days	Officiating.
9	Sir William Lockhart	General; Sir William Lockhart (1841–1900)	4 November 1898	18 March 1900 †	1 year, 134 days	–
10	Sir Arthur Palmer	General; Sir Arthur Palmer (1840–1904)	19 March 1900	28 November 1902	2 years, 254 days	–
11	The Viscount Kitchener	General; The Viscount Kitchener (1850–1916)	28 November 1902	10 September 1909	6 years, 286 days	Reconstructed the disorganised Indian Army, but quarreled with the Viceroy Lord Curzon, who resigned.
12	Sir O'Moore Creagh	General; Sir O'Moore Creagh (1848–1923)	10 September 1909	8 March 1914	4 years, 179 days	Douglas Haig, then a lieutenant general, served as Chief of the General Staff (India) in 1909–12.
13	Sir Beauchamp Duff	General; Sir Beauchamp Duff (1855–1918)	8 March 1914	1 October 1916	2 years, 207 days	–
14	Sir Charles Monro	General; Sir Charles Monro (1860–1929)	1 October 1916	21 November 1920	4 years, 51 days	–
15	The Lord Rawlinson	General; The Lord Rawlinson (1864–1925)	21 November 1920	28 March 1925 †	4 years, 127 days	Former GOC, British Fourth Army on the Western Front.
16	Sir Claud Jacob	General; Sir Claud Jacob (1863–1948)	3 April 1925	6 August 1925	125 days	–
17	The Lord Birdwood	Field Marshal; The Lord Birdwood (1865–1951)	6 August 1925	30 November 1930	5 years, 116 days	Distinguished commander of ANZAC troops on Gallipoli and the Western Front.
18	The Lord Chetwode	Field Marshal; The Lord Chetwode (1869–1950)	30 November 1930	30 November 1935	5 years	The Indian Military Academy was established during his tenure.
19	Sir Robert Cassels	General; Sir Robert Cassels (1876–1959)	30 November 1935	27 January 1941	5 years, 58 days	–
20	Sir Claude Auchinleck	General; Sir Claude Auchinleck (1884–1981)	27 January 1941	5 July 1941	159 days	Left to take command of the Middle East Command (swapped jobs with Wavell).
21	Sir Archibald Wavell	General; Sir Archibald Wavell (1883–1950)	5 July 1941	5 January 1942	184 days	Left to take command of the short lived ABDACOM; later became Viceroy.
22	Sir Alan Hartley	General; Sir Alan Hartley (1882–1954)	5 January 1942	7 March 1942	61 days	–
(21)	Sir Archibald Wavell	Field Marshal; Sir Archibald Wavell (1883–1950)	7 March 1942	20 June 1943	1 year, 105 days	Reappointment. Sir Alan Hartley appointed Deputy C-in-C, India.
(20)	Sir Claude Auchinleck	Field Marshal; Sir Claude Auchinleck (1884–1981)	20 June 1943	15 August 1947	4 years, 56 days	Served as the last C-in-C, India. Reappointed 15 August 1947, and became Supreme Commander of India and Pakistan. Oversaw division of the Armed forces between the two new countries. Served in this capacity until November 1948, when the role of Supreme Commander was abolished.

== See also ==
- Secretary of State for India
- Governor-General of India
- Chief of the General Staff
- Chief of the Army Staff
- Commander-in-Chief of the Pakistan Army
