= Ek Veer Stree Ki Kahaani – Jhansi Ki Rani =

Indian historical television series

- Also known as: Veer Mannu Ki Kahaani... Jhansi ki Rani
- Genre: Historical fiction Drama
- Created by: Abhimanyu Singh
- Written by: Rajesh Saksham; Ila Dutta Bedi; Malavika Asthana; Mairaj Zaidi; Virendra Singh Patyal
- Directed by: Nikhil Sinha, Jitendra Srivastava; Dharmesh Shah
- Creative director: Sujata Rao
- Starring: Kratika Sengar; Ulka Gupta; Sameer Dharmadhikari; Amit Pachori; Hemant Choudhary; Shailesh Dattar; Edward Sonnenblick; Vikas Verma; Alexx O'Nell
- Country of origin: India
- Original language: Hindi
- No. of seasons: 1
- No. of episodes: 480

Production
- Producer: Abhimanyu Singh
- Cinematography: Deepak Pandey
- Camera setup: Multi-camera
- Running time: 22 minutes
- Production company: Contiloe Entertainment

Original release
- Network: Zee TV
- Release: 18 August 2009 – 19 June 2011

Related
- Jhansi Ki Rani

Ek Veer Stree Ki Kahaani – Jhansi Ki Rani (transl. Story of a brave woman – Queen of Jhansi) is an Indian historical drama based on the life of Lakshmi Bai, the Rani of Jhansi. The series was directed by Jitendra Srivastava and written by Rajesh Saksham, Ila Dutta Bedi, Malavika Asthana, Mairaj Zaidi and Virendra Singh Patyal. It premiered on 18 August 2009 on Zee TV with Ulka Gupta playing young Queen Lakshmi Bai. On 8 June 2010, the story moved on several years and Kratika Sengar portrayed the Queen from there on. The last episode aired on 19 June 2011, completing 480 episodes. This show replaced Maayka serial time slot.

== Plot ==
14 years old Manikarnika "Manu" lives with her father, Moropant Tambe, a pandit in the Bithoor court of Peshwa Baji Rao II and Nana Saheb. Manu is trained in the art of war by Tatya Tope. She despises the British rule of India and combats against it. Manu is a thorn in the side of Manson, a British official.

Soon, she marries the king of Jhansi, Gangadhar Rao Newalkar. The court of Jhansi is headed by Raghunath Singh and Narsingh Rao. Her name changes to Lakshmi Bai, and her life changes drastically with various plots to separate and kill her and the King. At Jhansi a servant, Moti Bai, collaborates with British officer Captain Fraser but changes sides after realising her mistakes. Meanwhile, the three evil sisters-in-law of the King, Sukku, Lachchu and Jankibai also hatch various plots teaming up with the Britishers headed by Lord Dalhousie for capturing the throne of Jhansi but fail. Lakshmi Bai takes the form of Kranti Guru to combat the Britishers which everyone in the palace including the king is unaware of except some. Samar Singh initially being a dacoit turns good because of Lakshmi Bai and becomes one of her major support system in combating the Britishers. King Gangadhar and Queen Lakshmi Bai starts becoming closer understanding each other after various misunderstandings. When the British officer Marshal kills Prachi, Bajirao's little daughter, he is killed by Lakshmi Bai in revenge. When the King discovers that Kranti Guru is Queen Lakshmi Bai, he is angered while their relationship deteriorates. He agrees with a British officer that Kranti Guru will not be accused of Marshal's death if he hands over Queen's friend, Samar Singh. When Queen saves Samar, the King being furious gives her an ultimatum of either being a Queen in the palace or a rebellion leaving the palace. Lakshmibai demands him to accept both of her forms, the King not being ready for it, she leaves. She sees the British mistreating the villagers which was before a part of Jhansi. She takes an oath of not leaving the place until the villages are freed from the British and starts to live there with the name Rani without unveiling her real identity, persuades them to fight while she finds Samar Singh there and also comes across Karma who wants to kill the king for which British officer Captain Martin promises Karma the leadership of the villages if he works for them. Karma starts suspecting Lakshmibai.

Years passed but Lakshmi Bai and Gangadhar miss each other. While Gangadhar is in search of her, she hopes that her oath would be fulfilled soon and the King would accept both of her forms. Karma is saved by Lakshmibai after being betrayed by Marshal, who becomes an ally of her. Martin challenges Lakshmi Bai who was disguised as a man named Raja to fight against a mad man to retrieve the villages under Gangadhar's spectation. Her true identity is exposed to everyone. Gangadhar apologizes and accepts Lakshmi Bai, takes her back. Martin retires, and is replaced by Captains Malcom and Ross.

After several failed attempts to kill the King, Captain Nelson kills Ross and frames Samar Singh and hanged while Lakshmibai attempts a lot to prove his innocence. Rani visits Baji Rao, who is severely ill in Bithoor; he dies while Manson tries to conquer Bithoor Fort. Rani fights victoriously, and cuts off Manson's leg. She gives birth to Damodar Rao, and adopts Anand Rao. Nelson kills Damodar, Ali Bahadur kills the King and Captain Hamilton is sent to Jhansi to subdue it. Rani renames Anand Damodar and wages war against the East India Company against the backdrop of the Indian Rebellion of 1857. Hamilton pits Jhansi and the city of Orchha against each other; Orchha's queen, Ladai Sarkar, is sympathetic to the British and holds a grudge against Jhansi. Ladai Sarkar gets hold of Tatya Tope, Raghunath Singh and Ghaus Khan, captures them, and locks them up in her palace but Rani Lakshmi Bai frees them and wins the battle. The victorious Rani returns to a conquered Jhansi, which she reclaims after threatening the life of the 1st Earl of Dalhouise. Nelson frames her for the death of the king of Mot, and when Ladai Sarkar (the king's sister-in-law) captures Rani he betrays Sarkar. The queens become allies in prison, and after Rani escapes she kills Nelson. Queen Victoria sends General Hugh Henry Rose, who helps Hamilton capture Prince Damodar, as a replacement. After Rani saves her son's life she kills Hamilton; Hugh Rose's army attacks Jhansi Fort, where many of her loyal followers and allies including Guass Khan, Karma, Moropant Tambe, Jhalkaribai, Ladai Sarkar and Kashi die. Bithoor is conquered while Nana Saheb flees to Nepal.

Before the final battle Tatya Tope brings his army for Rani Laxmibai's aid. Rani Laxmibai leaves her fort and goes to Gwalior along with her army. In Gwalior she fights her final battle where she is betrayed by the Prime Minister of Gwallior. In the final battle, Raghunath Singh in an attempt to divert the Britishers is shot dead. During the course of battle, Rani Laxmibai is severely injured when the British general repeatedly stabs her in the abdomen with a sword. Later she is shot in the stomach. She also suffers a head wound. She hands over Damodar Rao to Tatya Tope and tells him to safeguard the prince before taking on the Britishers for one final time. Moments before her death she tells a villager to burn her body so that the British will not touch it.

== Cast ==
=== Main ===
- Kratika Sengar as Rani Lakshmibai Kranti Guru / Rana Bakura (2010–2011)
  - Ulka Gupta as young Rani Lakshmibai / Manikarnika aka Manu / Kranti Guru (2009–2010)
- Sameer Dharmadhikari as King Gangadhar Rao Newalkar: Rani Laxmibai's husband
- Amit Pachori as Tatya Tope / Kranti Guru 2: Rani Laxmibai's guru)
- Hemant Choudhary as Raghunath Singh: Commander in Chief of Jhansi
- Shailesh Dattar as Moropant Tambe: Rani Laxmibai's father
- Siddharth Vasudev as Samar Singh
- Ravindra Mankani as Baji Rao II
- Dinesh Kaushik as Narsingh Rao
- Puneet Vashist as Karma and Captain Bheem Singh
- Sanjay Swaraj as Rai Dulhajo
- Manoj Verma as Ghulam Ghaus Khan: the most skilled gunman in Jhansi state
- Shreya Laheri as Sunder
- Aruna Irani as Vahini Sahiba

=== Recurring ===
- Ashnoor Kaur as Prachi: Baji Rao's young daughter
- Puneet Panjwani as Nana Sahib (2010–2011)
  - Satyajeet Dubey / Shaheer Sheikh (2009–2010): young Nana Sahib
- Aarav Chowdhary as Mangal Pandey
- Shagun Ajmani as Moti Bai
- Jaya Bhattacharya as Sakhu Bai
- Amita Nangia as Lachcho Bai
- Sunila Karambelkar as Jankibai
- Priyam Ambalia as Anand Rao / Damodar Rao
- Tanya Malji as young Indu
- Surbhi Tiwari as Maina Bai
- Ishita Vyas as Jhalkaribai / Rana Bankura
- Tarun Khanna as Ali Bahadur
- Sharhaan Singh as Krishna Rao
- Vishnu Sharma as Vadrayan
- Trishikha Tiwari as Vaaishali
- Dev Khubnani as Dhrupad
- Pranitaa Pandit as Juhi
- Soni Singh as Vishkanya
- Minal Kapoor as Mandira
- Eva Grover as Bhagirathi Tambe
- Benaf Dadachandji as Ganga
- Ashwini Kalsekar as Heera Bai
- Achint Kaur as Larai Sarkar of Orchha
- Ulka Gupta as Kaali: The daughter of Bandhu, a tribal. (2011)
- Sudhanshu Pandey as Kunwar Yuvraj: The Prince of Modh
- Madhurima Tuli as Gayatri
- Jayajirao Scindia of Gwalior
- Shefali Gupta as Naari Sena Chief
- Raja Bahadur of Gwalior
- Dinkar Rao of Gwalior

=== Englishmen ===
- Alexx O'Nell as Major Robert W. Ellis
- Ben Kaplan as John Lang
- Gary Richardson as The Earl of Dalhousie
- Thomas Munro as Hugh Henry Rose
- David Steele as Captain Mac
- Edward Sonnenblick as Captain James Manson/Captain John W. Nelson
- Ramona Sav as Rose Nelson
- David Steele as Gall
- Maurice Caves as British Officer
- Vikas Verma as Marshall/Captain Robert Hamilton
- Ganpat Roa as Captain Malcolm
- Sam Brown as Captain Raus
- Simon Fraser as Captain Fraser
- Glen David Short as Commissioner Wilson
- Robin Pratt as Sir Moreland (Commissioner of Kanpur)
- Suzanne Bernert as Mistress Moreland

== Production ==
=== Development ===
We wanted to showcase the spirit of Rani Lakshmi Bai to celebrate 150 years of the war of independence as well to commemorate her death. It was her 150th death anniversary last year. So we thought of enlivening consciousness about her.

— Nitin Vaidya, Business Head of Zee TV

The show required months of research to get the right look and ambience. We had to do a lot of research to recreate an era 1834 onwards. We had to recreate locations, costumes, characteristics, locations, action, etc., and all this required over two and a half months of pre-production. This is definitely the biggest show we have ever produced.

— Abhimanyu Singh, Head of Contiloe Entertainment

Effort has been geared towards being true to the facts. For the project, I extensively referred to historical writings by both Indian and western historians. Creative liberties have been taken only in the portrayal of the characters' mannerisms and presentation of particular happenings, without losing touch with the facts and well established truths associated with Rani Laxmi Bai and her times.

— Mairaj Zaidi, scriptwriter of the series

In 2007, during the 150th year of Indian Rebellion of 1857, Zee TV started conceptualizing the life of Rani Lakshmi Bai into a series while they roped Mairaj Zaidi as one of the writers who was already exploring on her since ten years.

Originally the track of Ulka Gupta as young Queen Lakshmi Bai was planned for about 150 episodes but was extended till 207 episodes with good response for her.

On 26 January 2011, Zee TV aired a special episode titled Salute at 8 where Queen Lakshmi Bai battles saves her son Anand Rao and her father Moropant Tambe from the Britishers while actors from other series of the channel then were shown paying tribute to Jhansi Rani by singing the National anthem.

=== Filming ===
The series is filmed at various historical locations and sets created in Maharashtra, Rajasthan, Madhya Pradesh and Gujarat which includes Karjat, Mumbai in Maharashtra; Maheshwar, Indore in Madhya Pradesh; Aamgaon, Silvasa in Gujarat; Jaipur, Bhangarh Fort in Rajasthan and few others.

=== Cancellation and future ===
The series ended on 19 June 2011 completing 480 episodes. In 2019, the production house Contiole Entertainment rebooted the series as Khoob Ladi Mardaani…Jhansi Ki Rani for Colors TV which aired from 11 February to 12 July 2019 completing 110 episodes.

== Dubbed versions ==
Language	Title	Original release	Network(s)	Last aired
Hindi	Jhansi Ki Rani झांसी की रानी	18 August 2009	Zee TV	19 June 2011
Telugu	Veernari Jhansi Lakshmi వీర్నారి ఝాన్సీ లక్ష్మి	19 April 2010	Zee Telugu	4 February 2012
Tamil	Jhansi Rani ஜான்சி ராணி	31 January 2011	Zee Tamil	28 January 2012
Marathi	Jhashichi Rani झाशीची राणी	31 October 2011	Zee Marathi	30 March 2012
Malayalam	Jhansi Rani ഝാൻസി റാണി	5 October 2020	Zee Keralam	28 November 2020

It was also dubbed in Kannada and was supposed to air on Zee Kannada from 16 May 2011, but due to opposition against airing dubbed serials in Karnataka, the series was dropped. On Indian Independence day in the same year, some portions of the series were used as clips and was shown during the narration on story of Rani Lakshmi Bai in a one-hour special program titled Veeranari Jhansi Rani which lead to the ransacking of Zee Kannada office by the protesters for including some dubbed clips from the series for which Zee Kannada defended, “We aired a one-houred programme based on Jhansi Ki Rani. We used the Hindi footages wherever required and had hired a well-known Kannada presenter to give commentary on it. We have not dubbed the Hindi serial and all the characters in the programme spoke in Hindi and we used Kannada subtitles to convey the message to Kannada audience. Because it was Independence Day, we aired the program on the great historical figure of the first Indian freedom struggle."

== Reception ==
=== Historical accuracy ===
The drama was praised for the historical accuracy of the dresses and ornaments worn by the characters. However, doubts were raised on the authenticity of "Ek Veer Stree Ki Kahani... Jhansi Ki Rani" by some historians. Jhansi-based historian Professor Jawaharlal Kanchan protested that the drama is playing with history and providing incorrect information to young minds. The bone of contention for Prof Kanchan is an episode which shows Rani Laxmi Bai wounded by enemy soldiers while on a visit to a hilltop temple in Jhansi. "And despite being hurt she visits the temple. But there is no historical evidence of such an incident and neither is there any such hilltop temple in Jhansi," he points out. Dr A. K. Pandey, director, State Museum, Jhansi states, "makers of the serial should understand that they cannot distort historical facts just for the sake of TRPs."

=== Reactions from orthodox viewers ===
Certain reactions from orthodox Indian viewers and historians were negative. The director of the State Museum (Dr A. K. Pandey) at Jhansi states, "Rani Lakshmi Bai is like a goddess to us and seeing her story presented in a distorted manner is painful. Showing intimate bedroom scenes of Jhansi Ki Rani is also unacceptable." Dharmesh Shah, the director of the drama defends it by pointing out, "The British ruled that any kingdom without an heir would be annexed by the East India Company. So Rani Laxmi Bai wanted an heir, because of which we were required to show those intimate scenes. There is no need of creating a hullabaloo."

=== Critics ===
Drawing reference to Vrindhavan Lal Verma's novel Jhansi Ki Rani, Dainik Bhaskar stated that the relationship between King Gangadhar Rao and Mothi Bai in the series was not portrayed correctly.

Deccan Herald stated, "Be it swordsmanship, horse-riding or just mastering the dialect, the beauty is leaving no stone unturned in ensuring that she plays the legendary freedom fighter with dignity and elan.

=== Ratings ===
Since its inception, the series was well received and was often seen in weekly list of top 10 watched Hindi GECs in its run time. The series opened with a rating of 4.09 TVR in its debut week (week 34 of 2009) becoming seventh most watched Hindi GEC. In week 8 of 2010, it was at tenth position with 3.9 TVR. In weeks sixteen to eighteen of 2010, it maintained its position in one of the top Hindi GEC programs with 4.2 TVR. In week ending 26 June 2010 and the previous week, it garnered 3.5 and 3.4 TVR. As in October 2010, it was at eighth position in top ten Hindi GECs ranging between 2.7 and 3.2 TVR. In week 4 of 2011, it garnered 4.46 TVR occupying fourth position. In week 9, it dropped to tenth position with 3.58 TVR.

== Awards ==
2010 Zee Gold Awards

- Best Videography (Fiction) - Deepak Pandey
- Best Art Direction - Sandesh Gondhalekar
- Best Editing
- Performer of the Year - Ulka Gupta

2010 FICCI Award

- Best Entertainer of the Year
- Ulka Gupta
- Best Dialogue Writer Awards For Historical Drama

== See also ==
- The Revolt of 1857
- 1857 Kranti (TV series)
