= Parola, Maharashtra =

Parola native of Rani Lakshmibai Jhansi
- city
- Nickname: Jahagir of Newalkar
- Location in Maharashtra, India
- Coordinates: 20.88°N 75.12°E
- Country: India
- State: Maharashtra
- District: Jalgaon

Government
  - Body: Municipal Council
- Elevation: 261 m (856 ft)

Population (2001)
  - Total: 34,800

Languages
  - Official: Marathi
- Time zone: UTC+5:30 (IST)
- Postal code: 425111
- ISO 3166 code: IN-MH
- Vehicle registration: MH 19
- Website: maharashtra.gov.in

Parola is a town and a municipal council in Jalgaon district in the Indian state of Maharashtra. It is located on the Hajira (Surat)–Dhule–Kolkata national highway 6. The municipal council was established by the British government before the independence of India. This City is centuries old, and is known for the two main features, The Shree Balaji Temple and The Parola fort, also known as the native of Rani Laxmibai of Jhansi. The city and fort were built by Jahagirdar Sadashiv Rao Damodar Newalkar, the great grandfather in law of Rani Lakshmibai Jhansi.

== History ==
The Newalkars of Jhansi were the jagirdars of the town. The town has a fort constructed by Sadashiv Rao Damodar Newalkar in 1726, the great grandfather of Rani Laxmibai.

As Konkanstha Tambe settled here over time, this village is said to be the native of Queen Lakshmibai of Jhansi. Also, Rani Lakshmibai's adopted son Anand Rao alias Damodar Rao Newalkar was born on 15 November 1849 in this town. His father Vasudevarao Newalkar was a Jagirdar of Parola.

In 1859, the town of Parola and its fort which belonged to a member of the Jhansi family were confiscated by British government and the fort was dismantled.

== Geography ==
Parola is located at 20.88°N 75.12°E. It has an average elevation of 261 metres (856 feet).

== Demographics ==
As of the 2001 India census, Parola had a population of 34,800. Males constituted 52% of the population and females 48%. Parola had an average literacy rate of 69%, higher than the national average of 59.5%: male literacy was 76%, and female literacy was 61%. In Parola, 13% of the population was under 6 years of age.

Year	Male	Female	Total Population	Change	Religion (%)							
Year	Male	Female	Total Population	Change	Hindu	Muslim	Christian	Sikhs	Buddhist	Jain	Other religions and persuasions	Religion not stated
2001	18014	16785	34799	-	82.968	14.437	0.069	0.063	0.603	1.747	0.023	0.089
2011	19552	18114	37666	0.082	81.718	14.984	0.170	0.027	1.120	1.813	0.000	0.167

== Connectivity ==
=== Road ===
Parola is situated on Asian Highway 46 NH 6 (National Highway – 06), well connected to Jalgaon, Dhule, Nasik, Nagpur, Pune, Mumbai and major cities of India like Surat, Ahmedabad and Kolkata. Dhule is 35km west of Parola and Jalgaon is 56km east of Parola.

In 2020, the Highway NH6 construction was still on which will be an express Highway connecting east and west of India.

Major City Connectivity from Parola.

- Mumbai is situated at 359 KM from Parola.
- Nashik is approx 194 Km form Parola
- Pune is approximately 375 KM from Parola
- Nagpur is around 486 KM from Parola
- Aurangabad is around 150 Km From Parola
- Ahmedabad is approx 538 Km From Parola

=== Railway ===
The nearest railway station is Amalner on Western Railway, about 20 KM away.

- Dhule Station – 35 km
- Pachora Station – 45 km
- Chalisgaon Station – 56 km
- Jalgaon Station – 56 km

=== Airports ===
The nearest airport is Dhule. The nearest international airport is Chhatrapati Shivaji International Airport, Mumbai.

Jalgaon Airport (ICAO: VAJL) is a public airport located off State Highway 186, 6 km south-east of Jalgaon, in the Nashik Division of Maharashtra.

== Famous people ==
Sadashiv Rao Newalkar established the city around the 17th–18th century. He was a cousin of the King of Jhansi Gangadharrao Newalkar (the husband of Rani Laxmibai). King Gangadhar gifted the city of Parola to Sadashivrao as a jagir. Sadashivrao built the fort in Parola as well as five big gates called Darwajas. The fort and Delhi Darwaja still exist.

- Shri Hari Narayan Apte: a famous Marathi writer who was born in Parola and then moved to Pune.

== Balaji Temple ==
It is a very old temple with a huge stone entrance called "Nagarkhana" and in front of the temple there is "Garudadhwaj".

== Shree Chintamani Parshvanath Digambar Jain Temple ==
Shree Parshvanath Digambar Jain Temple, which is one of the oldest Jain temples (more than 200 years old) in the North of Maharashtra, is situated in Parola.

== Attractions ==
The Balaji Temple in Parola

Parola is famous for Shree Balaji. Shree Balaji first arrived in Parola in 1661. Every year, there is a procession for Shree Balaji which is very famous in Maharashtra and people gather to see the procession.

Parola is also famous for the fort, built by Khander rao around the 16th century. Madkay maroti is also a famous temple in Parola.

In Parola, there is Old Jain Temple. 16 No Bhagawan Shri Shantinath Bhagwan Derasahr maybe 1500 year old Murti and 150-year-old Shikharband Derasahr under by Kutchi Dasa Oswal Swetamber Trust.
