= Lakhsman Rao Jhansiwale =

Indian royal family member (1904–1959)

- Born: Shrimant Laxman Rao Jhansiwale; 1904
- Died: 1959 (aged 54–55)
- Children: Krishna Rao, Chandrakant Rao
- Parents: Damodar Rao of Jhansi (father); Lady Shivre (personal name unknown) (mother)

Lakshman Rao Jhansiwale (1904–1959) was the son of Damodar Rao of Jhansi (born Anand Rao). His father Damodar Rao was the adopted son of Raja Gangadhar Rao and Rani Laxmibai of Jhansi State. Lakshman Rao was paid a pension of Rs. 200/- per month by British India, after the death of his father, as part of British policy to pay money to deposed rulers or their next kin. He continued to live in the residence provided by the British to his father in Indore.

He started using surname, Jhansiwale after the land of their forebears, Jhansi. He lived a penurious life and later worked as typist at the Indore court. The Government of Uttar Pradesh had presented a Sanad and a monetary award to him at a function held on 10 May 1957 in commemoration of his grandmother, Rani Laxmibai's, contribution in war of independence, celebrating the centenary of the Revolt of 1857. He died in 1959 survived by two sons Krishanrao and Chandrakantrao. The pension was continued to be paid to his elder son, Krishna Rao Jhansiwale, however was stopped upon his death by Uttar Pradesh Government in 1967 and family also had to vacate house provided by government in Residency area of Indore. The family was chief guest at felicitation ceremony on the inaugural function of Jhansi Jan Mahotsav held at Jhansi Fort in 2015.
