= Central Indian campaign of 1858 =

Final battles of the 1857 Indian revolt

The Central India Campaign was one of the last series of actions in the Indian rebellion of 1857. The British Army and Bombay Army overcame a disunited collection of states in a single rapid campaign, although determined rebels continued a guerrilla campaign until the spring of 1859.

== Outbreak of the Rebellion ==
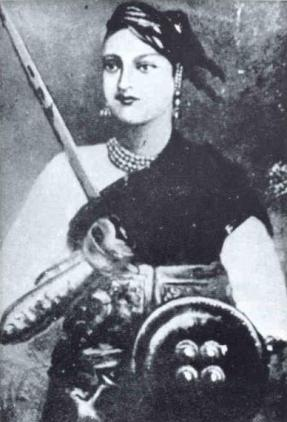
Lakshmibai, the Rani of Jhansi.

The area known to the British at the time as Central India now consists of the states of Madhya Pradesh, Uttar Pradesh and Rajasthan. A large part of it was included in the region of Bundelkhand named after its former Bundela rulers. In 1857, it was administered as the Central India Agency and consisted of six large and almost 150 small states, nominally ruled by Maratha or Mughal princes, but actually controlled to a greater or lesser degree by Residents or Commissioners appointed by the East India Company. Opposition to British control centred on Jhansi, where the Rani Lakshmibai, widow of the last Maratha prince Gangadhar Rao, opposed the British annexation of the state under the notorious doctrine of lapse.

The loyalty of the Indian soldiers (sepoys) of the East India Company's Bengal Army had been under increasing strain over the previous decade, and on 10 May 1857, the sepoys at Meerut, north of Delhi, broke into open rebellion. News of this outbreak spread rapidly, and most other units of the Bengal Army also rebelled.

Nine regiments of Bengal Native Infantry and three of cavalry were stationed in Central India. There was also a large Gwalior Contingent, raised largely from Oudh (or Awadh) and similar in organisation to the irregular units of the Bengal Army, but in the service of the Maharajah Jayajirao Scindia of Gwalior, who remained allied to the British. Almost all these units rose up against their officers during June and July. There were very few British units to oppose them, and Central India fell entirely out of British control.

At Jhansi, British officers, civilians and dependents took shelter in a nearby fort on 5 June. They emerged three days later after being assured of their safety and were immediately murdered by the rebellious sepoys and irregulars. Rani Lakshmibai had no complicity in this act but was nevertheless blamed by the British (the rebels were then the only armed force in the city and no British forces were there to oppose them).

Over the next few months, most of the former Company regiments marched to take part in the Siege of Delhi, where they were eventually defeated. The Gwalior Contingent remained largely inactive until October, when they were led to defeat at Cawnpore by Tantya Tope. These defeats deprived the rebels of a substantial body of trained and experienced troops, and made the subsequent British campaign easier. Meanwhile, most of the now independent princes began raising levies and warring with each other, or demanding ransoms from each other on threat of force. The Nawab of Banda, Ali Bahadur II, who induced several units of sepoys to join his service on the promise of loot, appears to have been particularly rapacious.

One Mughal prince, Firoz Shah, attempted to lead an army into the Bombay Presidency to the south, but was defeated by a small force under the acting Commissioner for Central India, Sir Henry Durand. Durand then overawed Tukojirao II (the ruler of Indore in Malwa region), into surrender.

== The Campaign to the fall of Kalpi ==
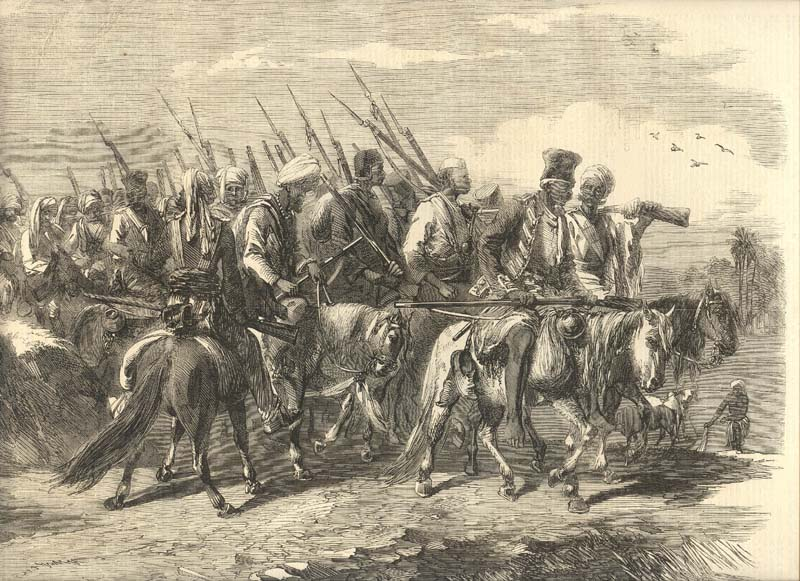
Tatya Tope's army

The Central India Field Force, under Sir Hugh Rose took the field around Indore in late December 1857. The force consisted of two small brigades only. About half the troops were Indian units from the Bombay Presidency army, which had not been affected to the same extent by the tensions which led the Bengal Army to rebel. Rose was initially opposed only by the various armed retainers and levied forces of the kings of allied princely states, whose equipment and efficiency were sometimes in doubt. Much of the rebel attention was focused to the north of the region, where Tantya Tope and other leaders were attempting to aid the rebels in Awadh, making Rose's campaign from the south comparatively easy.

Rose's first mission was to relieve the town of Saugor, where a small European garrison was besieged. He accomplished this on 5 February, after some hard-fought battles against Afghan and Pashtun mercenaries at Rathgar. Thousands of local villagers welcomed him as a liberator, freeing them from rebel occupation. His force had then to wait at Saugor for several weeks while transport and supplies were collected.

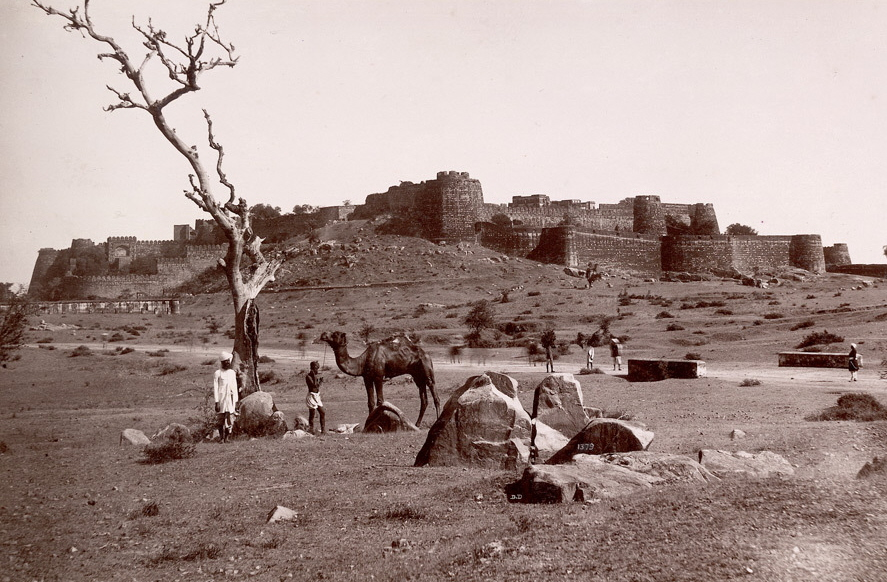
Jhansi Fort

Rose assembled his forces at Madanpur then advanced towards Jhansi by two routes, each column capturing and destroying numerous forts. When the British forces finally arrived at Jhansi they found that the city was well defended and the fort had heavy guns which could fire over the town and nearby countryside. Rose demanded the surrender of the city; if this was refused it would be destroyed. After due deliberation the Rani issued a proclamation. "We fight for independence. In the words of Lord Krishna, we will if we are victorious, enjoy the fruits of victory, if defeated and killed on the field of battle, we shall surely earn eternal glory and salvation." Rose ignored instructions from the Commander in Chief to detach forces to assist two "loyal" Rajahs, and laid siege to Jhansi on 24 March. The bombardment was met by heavy return fire and the damaged defences were repaired.

The defenders sent appeals for help to Tantya Tope. An army of more than 20,000 headed by Tantya Tope was sent to relieve Jhansi but they failed to do so when they fought the British on 31 March. Even though he attacked at the most opportune moment, his scratch force was no match for Rose's troops, and he was defeated at the Battle of Betwa the next day and forced to retreat. At the height of the hottest and driest part of the year, the rebels set fire to the forests to delay British pursuit, but the blaze disrupted their own army. They eventually retreated to Kalpi, abandoning all their guns.

During the battle with Tatya Tope's forces part of the British forces continued the siege and by 2 April it was decided to launch an assault. Jhansi was stormed on 3 April. The city wall had been breached and this was assaulted by one column, whilst other columns assaulted the defences at different points by attempting to scale the high walls, one on the left and two on the right of the breach. These troops came under heavy fire but were relieved by the breach assault column when it took control of the walls. Two other columns had already entered the city and were approaching the palace together. Determined resistance was encountered in every street and in every room of the palace. Street fighting continued into the following day and no quarter was given, even to women and children. "No maudlin clemency was to mark the fall of the city" wrote Thomas Lowe. The fighting stopped on 5 April when the defenders abandoned the fort. There were a number of atrocities committed by the attackers, and much looting and indiscipline. 5,000 defenders and civilians died. (British casualties were 343).

The Rani withdrew from the palace to the fort and after taking counsel decided that since resistance in the city was useless she must leave and join either Tatya Tope or Rao Sahib (Nana Sahib's nephew). The Rani escaped in the night with her son, surrounded by guards, probably while Rose's cavalry were busy looting.

Rose was once again forced to pause while discipline and order was restored, but on 5 May he advanced towards Kalpi. Once again, the rebels attempted to fight in front of the city, and once again the British won a decisive although largely bloodless victory, at Kunch on 6 May. This led to demoralisation and mutual recrimination among the rebels, but their morale recovered when the Nawab of Banda reinforced them with his troops. On 16 May, they fought desperately to save the city, but were again defeated. Although there were few British battle casualties, many of Rose's soldiers were struck down by sunstroke.

== The recapture of Gwalior ==
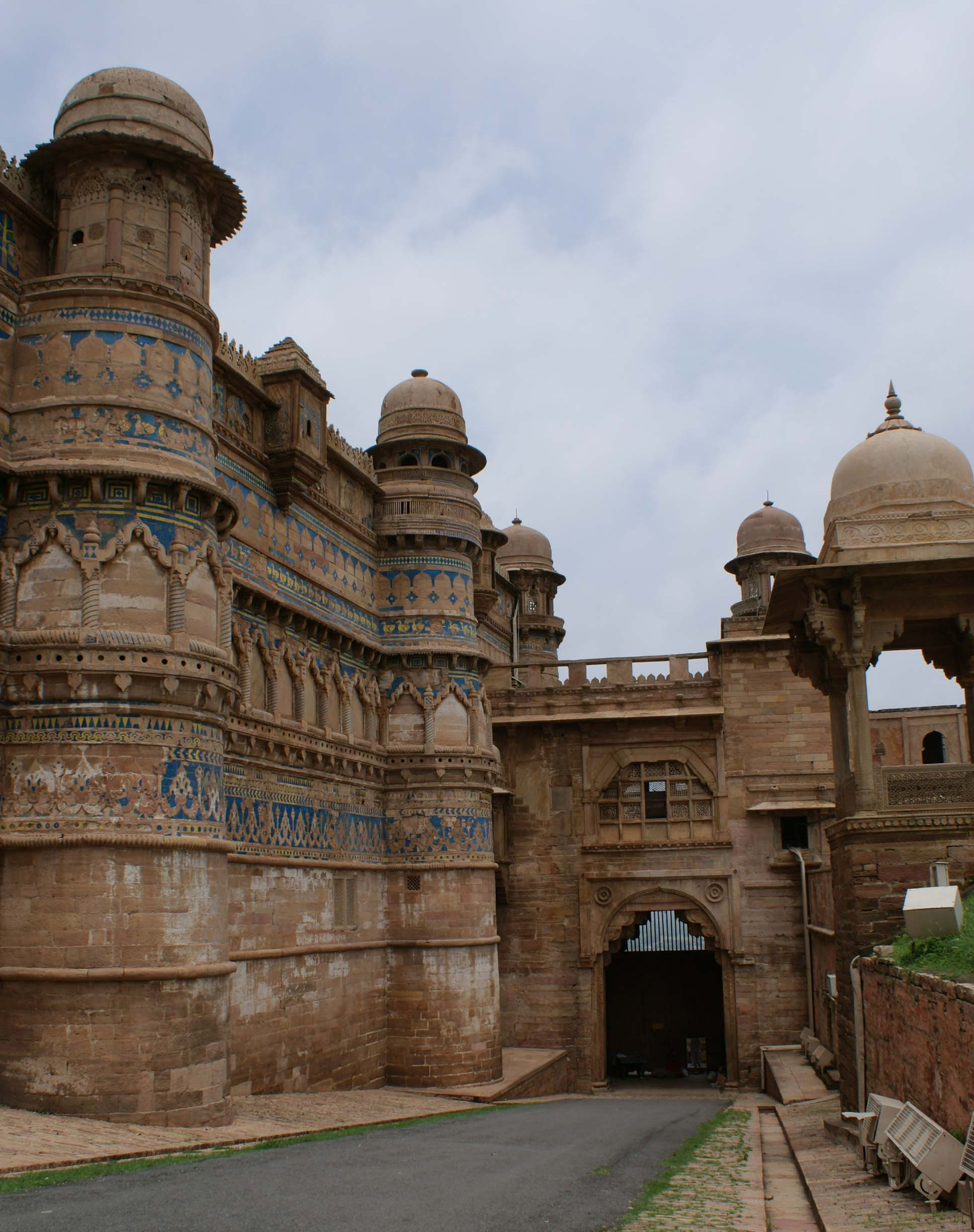
Part of Gwalior Fort

With the fall of Kalpi, Rose thought the campaign was over and applied to go on sick leave. The rebel leaders managed to rally some of their forces, and agreed on a plan to capture Gwalior from its ruler, Maharajah Scindia, who had continued to side with the British. On 1 June 1858 the Maharaja led his forces to Morar, a large military cantonment a few miles east of Gwalior, to fight a rebel army led by Tatya Tope, Rani Lakshmibai and Rao Sahib. This army had 7,000 infantry, 4,000 cavalry and 12 guns while he had only 1,500 cavalry, his bodyguard of 600 men and 8 guns. He waited for their attack which came at 7 o'clock in the morning; in this attack the rebel cavalry took the guns and most of the Gwalior forces except the bodyguard went over to the rebels (some deserted). The Maharaja and the remainder fled without stopping until they reached the British garrison at Agra.

The rebels captured Gwalior, but there was no looting, other than from Scindia's treasury to pay the rebel troops. The rebels now wasted time celebrating and proclaiming the renewed rebellion. Rose had offered to remain in the field until his replacement arrived, and on 12 June, he recaptured Morar, in spite of the great heat and humidity. Rani Lakshmi Bai was killed in a cavalry action near Kotah-ke-Serai on 17 June. Over the next two days, most rebels abandoned Gwalior while the British recaptured the city, although there was some desperate resistance before the fort fell.

== Last actions ==
Most of the rebel leaders now surrendered or went into hiding, but Tatya Tope remained in the field. Aided by monsoon rains which delayed his pursuers, Tatya continued to dodge around Central India. Other leaders joined him, among them Rao Sahib, Man Singh, and Firuz Shah (who had been fighting in Rohilkhand). Eventually in April 1859, Tatya Tope was betrayed by Man Singh, and hanged.

== Review ==
Indian historians criticise the conduct of the Indian princes, most of whom were self-interested or effete, and the lack of leadership among the sepoys. In the East India Company's Army, no Indian soldier could attain a rank greater than that equivalent to a subaltern or senior warrant officer. Most of the sepoys' officers were elderly men who had attained their rank through seniority while seeing little action and receiving no training as leaders. The rebellion therefore depended on charismatic leaders such as Tatya Tope and Rani Lakshmi Bai, who nevertheless were regarded with jealousy and animosity by many other princes.

In many cases, the defenders of cities and fortresses fought well at first but were demoralised when relieving forces were defeated, and then abandoned easily defended positions without fighting.

By contrast, Durand, Rose, and their principal subordinates had acted quickly and decisively. Many of their forces came from the Bombay Army, which was not disaffected to the same degree as the Bengal Army.

== Awards ==
Victoria Cross

The Victoria Cross (VC) was awarded for gallantry to a number of participants in the campaign. (see List of Indian Mutiny Victoria Cross recipients)

Battle honour

The battle honour was awarded to the bulk of regiments of the British Indian Army (vide Gazette of India No 4 of 1864, to the Hyderabad Contingent (vide 1014 of 1866 and 178 of 1878) and to the Merwara and Deoli Regiments (vide 78 of 1887 and 1146 of 1912). This battle honour is one of those considered and declared as repugnant. by the Indian government.

Units awarded this honour were:

- 4th Hyderabad Cavalry - 8th King George's Own Light Cavalry
- 3rd Bombay Cavalry - Poona Horse
- 1st Hyderabad Cavalry - Deccan Horse
- 1st Sindh Horse - Scinde Horse
- Madras Sappers and Miners
- Bombay Sappers and Miners
- 19th Madras Infantry - 3rd Battalion, the Madras Regiment
- 12th Bombay Infantry - 5th Battalion, The Grenadiers
- 13th Bombay Infantry - The Grenadiers Regimental Centre
- 10th Bombay Infantry - 3rd Battalion, Maratha Light Infantry now 2nd Battalion, the Parachute Regiment.
- 25th Bombay Infantry - 5th Battalion, Rajputana Rifles
- 2nd Bengal Infantry - 1st Battalion, Rajput Regiment, now 4th Battalion, the Brigade of Guards.
- 3rd Hyderabad Infantry - 2nd Battalion, Kumaon Regiment
- 5th Hyderabad Infantry - 4th Battalion, Kumaon Regiment
- 1st, 2nd Bombay Cavalry - 13th Duke of Connaught's Own Lancers (Pakistan)
- 24th Bombay Infantry - 1st Battalion, 10th Baluch Regiment (Pakistan)
- 50th Madras Infantry - Disbanded 1862
- 3rd Sindh Horse - Disbanded 1882
- 3rd Hyderabad Cavalry - Disbanded 1901
- 42nd Deoli Regiment - Disbanded 1921
- 44th Merwara Infantry - Disbanded 1921
- 1st Madras Infantry (1st Bn Madras Pioneers) - Disbanded 1933
- 1st, 2nd, 4th Batteries (Hyderabad Contingent) - Disbanded circa 1950

Indian Mutiny Medal

The Indian Mutiny Medal with Central India clasp was awarded for service in Central India January - June 1858, to all those who served under Major-General Sir Hugh Rose in actions against Jhansi, Kalpi, and Gwalior. Also awarded to those who served with Major-General Roberts in the Rajputana Field Force and Major-General Whitlock of the Madras Column, between January and June 1858.
