= Khoob Ladi Mardaani – Jhansi Ki Rani =

Indian historical television series

- Also known as: Jhansi Ki Rani
- Genre: Historical Fiction; Drama
- Created by: Abhimanyu Singh
- Based on: Rani of Jhansi
- Developed by: Abhimanyu Singh
- Screenplay by: Faizal Akhtar
- Story by: Manikya Raju; Faizal Akhtar; Roshni Suvrna; Dialogues- Jyoti Jha
- Starring: See below
- Country of origin: India
- Original language: Hindi
- No. of seasons: 1
- No. of episodes: 110

Production
- Producers: Abhimanyu Singh; Roopali Singh
- Camera setup: Multi-camera
- Running time: 22–30 minutes
- Production company: Contiloe Entertainment

Original release
- Network: Colors TV
- Release: 11 February – 12 July 2019

Related
- Jhansi Ki Rani (2009 TV series)

Khoob Ladi Mardaani – Jhansi Ki Rani ('Fought Very Bravely – The Queen of Jhansi') is an Indian historical drama television series based on the life of warrior queen Lakshmi Bai, the Rani of Jhansi. The show, starring Anushka Sen went to air on Colors TV on 11 February 2019. Due to low TRPs, the show ended on 12 July 2019 completing 110 episodes. It was replaced by Bahu Begum.

== Plot ==
The show depicts the life of Manikarnika, a female warrior who becomes Rani Lakshmi Bai. The story begins with Manikarnika stealing the British flag and unfurling the flag of their nation. This angers the British and they search for the person who burnt their flag. As part of her journey, Manu marries King Gangadhar Rao of Jhansi, taking a position giving her the power to fight for independence for Jhansi as well as the rest of India. She becomes the Queen of Jhansi, one of the most abundant kingdoms, but not yet free from British rule. She fights both traitors to Jhansi and British rule despite the restrictions of traditional roles for women.

== Cast ==
=== Main ===
- Anushka Sen as Manikarnika Rao or Manu Tambe/Rani Lakshmi Bai / Jhansi Ki Rani, Mahakaali, Durga
- Vikkas Manaktala as Gangadhar Rao; Rani Lakshmi Bai's husband; King of Jhansi

=== Recurring ===
- Anuja Sathe as Rani Janki Bai, Gangadhar's sister-in-law
- Jason Shah as Captain Ross
- Aishwarya Raj Bhakuni as Ramabai, Gangadhar's first wife
- Rajesh Shringarpure as Morapant Tambe, Manu's father
- Anshul Trivedi as Tatya Tope
- Ryan Larson as Captain Robb, Ross' brother
- Mukesh Tripathi as Shiva Krantikari & Manjari's husband
- Ankur Nayyar as Gangadas
- Dolly Sohi as Sakubai, Gangadhar's eldest sister-in-law
- Himanshu Bamzai as Raghunath Rao
- Vijay Kashyap as Baji Rao II
- Piyali Munshi as Lachcho Bai, Gangadhar's younger sister-in-law
- Gaurav Vasudev as Captain Smith
- Naveen Pandita as Ali Bahadur
- Andy Von Eich as British Officer Masion
- Namit Shah as Nana Saheb Peshwa II
- Jagriti Sethia As Kaashi
- Athar Siddiqui as Veerbhadra
- Naren Kumar as Madanpal
- Nadeem Ahmad Khan as Britisher
- Chandan K Anand as Ghaus Khan
- Trupti Mishra as Manjari

== Production ==
=== Development ===
In 2019, the production house Contiole Entertainment rebooted their 2009 Zee TV series Jhansi Ki Rani for Colors TV.

It is a privilege and an honor to play the warrior queen who epitomized the spirit of patriotism, bravery and love for her family. The viewers will see two varied avatars of Manikarnika – the wife of a king who was pro-British and a young queen who wanted Jhansi’s freedom. This is my first major lead role and I am incredibly excited to portray one of the most iconic heroes from the history of Indian freedom struggle.

— Anushka Sen

Khoob Ladi Mardani...Jhansi Ki Rani is an evergreen inspirational nationalist story that needs to be told to every generation. While the viewers have heard stories of this legendary queen, not many are aware of the challenges she faced after getting married at a tender age. To revive a historical saga, it’s very critical that we take the viewers back in time with the scale, costumes, presentation and the production value. They say it was during this revolt that the new and young India was born, and it is very important that we represent it right by focusing on the nuances of that time. We are confident that the viewers will connect to this emotional journey of our Jhansi Ki Rani.

— Abhimanyu Singh CEO of Contiloe Entertainment

In January 2019, a massive fire broke out on the sets at Aamgaon where initial sequences were shot.
