= Siege of Jhansi =

Battle during Indian Rebellion of 1857–1858 at Jhansi

- Part of the Indian Rebellion of 1857
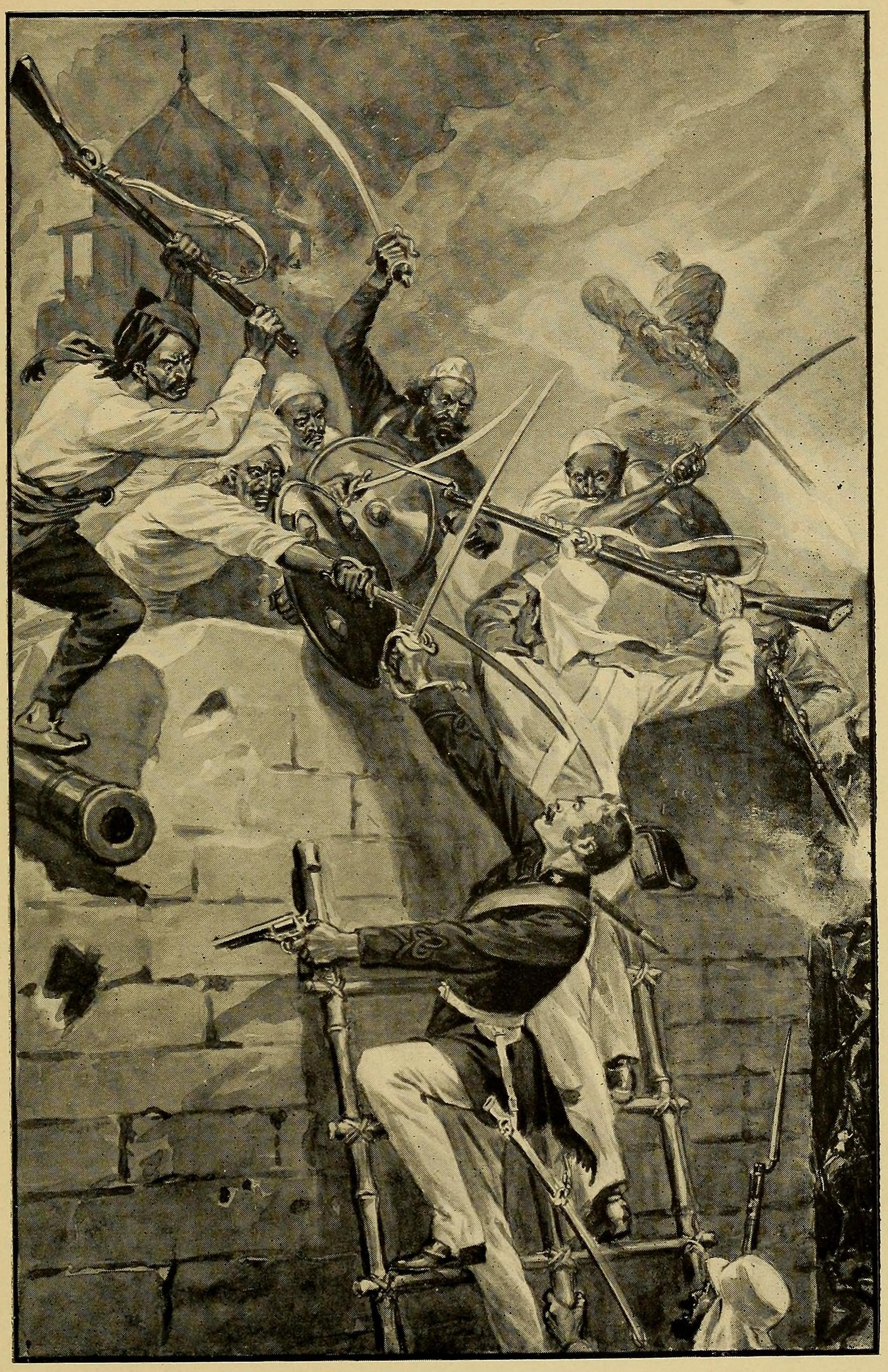
- The stroming of Jhansi by Lieutenant Bonus (illustration for the book Heroes of the Indian Mutiny from 1914)
Date	24 March – 5 April 1858
Location	Jhansi, India
Result	British–EIC victory

Belligerents
(United Kingdom) British Empire; East India Company	Rebel Company sepoys

Commanders and leaders
(United Kingdom) Hugh Rose	Queen Lakshmî Bai; Tatya Tope

Casualties and losses
343 killed and wounded	About 5,000

The Siege of Jhansi was a military siege during the Indian rebellion of 1857 set on the city of Jhansi, Uttar Pradesh by British forces of the East India Company between 24 March and 5 April 1858. British defeated the combined forces of the Principality of Jhansi and anti-British mutineers defending the city, successfully continuing in their Central Indian campaign.

== Prelude ==
Upon the death of Raja Gangadhar Rao in 1853, his wife Queen Lakshmî Bai assumed the regency on behalf of their adopted son Damodar Rao, following the doctrine of pre-emption. Governor-General Lord Dalhousie then decided that since Gangadhar Rao had left no heir, the state of Jhansi should be annexed by the English East India Company, rejecting Damodar Rao's claim as the legal heir. The Ranī petitioned Dalhousie and then appealed to London, but without success.

When the Indian Rebellion broke out by Meerut Mutiny in May 1857, many Indian soldiers in British ranks started to follow. On 5 June, sepoys of the 12th Bengal Native Infantry Regiment and the 14th Irregular Cavalry Regiment started a mutiny in Jhansi resuilting of two British officers killed, freeing the Indian prisoners from captivity and taking control of a ammunition and money supplies. British soldiers and civilians fled to the Jhansi Fort and the fort garrison under Major Alexander Skene sent messengers to Queen Rani Lakshmibai, asking for support. Although arms and ammunition were sent by her, the fort was then besieged by the mutineers. After the fort surrender on 7 June in exchange for free passage, all of them were then taken to Jokan Bagh and killed. Jhansi sepoys then left the city to support fighting near Agra or Delhi.

In December 1857 British formed a military expedition led by Sir Hugh Rose which set its course against regions of resistance. After taking the town of Saugor and a victorious clash at Rathgar on 5 February 1858, Rose assembled his forces at Madanpur and then advanced towards Jhansi by two routes, each column capturing and destroying numerous forts. When the British forces finally arrived at Jhansi they found that the city was well defended and the fort had heavy guns which could fire over the town and nearby countryside. Rose demanded the surrender of the city; if this was refused it would be destroyed. As Rani refused British demands and decided to fight, Rose ignored instructions from the Commander in Chief to detach forces to assist two "loyal" Rajahs, and laid siege to Jhansi on 24 March.

== Battle ==
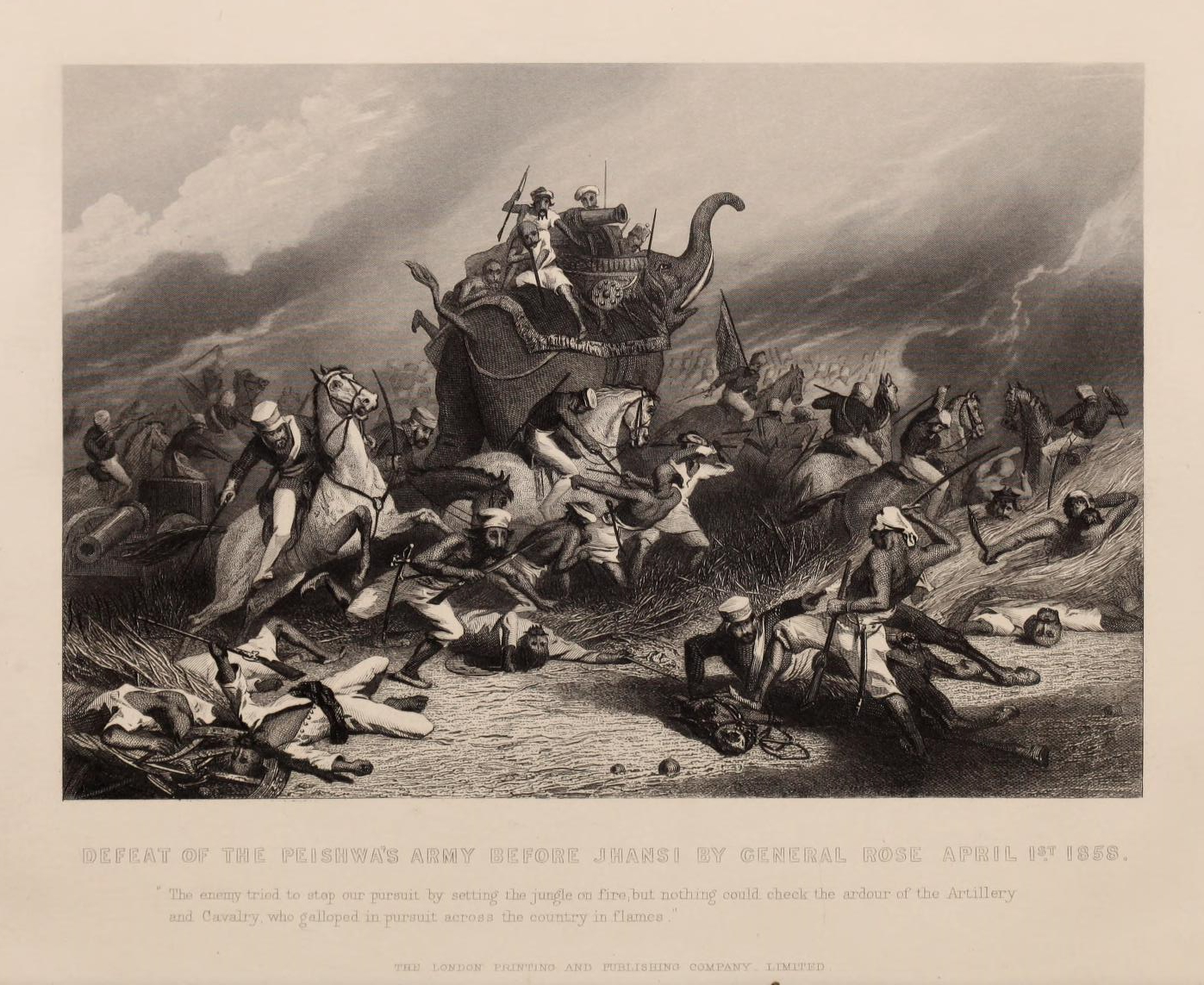
Defeat of the Peshwa's army before Jhansi, 1st April 1858

British artillery started to bombard the city walls and also positions of the city fort which led to heavy cannon exchange for the following days causing serious damage on the fortification of both sides. An army of more than 20,000 headed by Tantya Tope was sent to relieve the city, but failed to defeat the British during the clashes of 31 March and also 1 April 1858, at the Battle of Betwa, and were forced to retreat. At the height of the hottest and driest part of the year, the rebels set fire to the forests to delay British pursuit, but the blaze disrupted their own army. They eventually retreated to Kalpi, abandoning all their guns.

A decisive British attack on Jhansi started on 3 April. Infantry charge of one column successfully breached the city gate, while other columns assaulted the defences at different points by attempting to scale the high walls, one on the left and two on the right of the breach. These troops came under heavy fire but were relieved by the breach assault column when it took control of the walls. Two other columns had already entered the city and were approaching the palace together. The Rani withdrew from the palace to the fort and after taking counsel decided that since resistance in the city was useless she must leave and join either Tatya Tope or Rao Sahib (Nana Sahib's nephew). She escaped in the night with her son, surrounded by guards, probably while Rose's cavalry were busy looting. Street fighting continued for the next day, on 5 April the defenders abandoned the fort.

As the result of the siege about 5,000 Indian defenders and civilians died, while British lost 343 men. After taking the city a numerous incidents of British looting and indiscipline were recorded.

== Aftermath ==
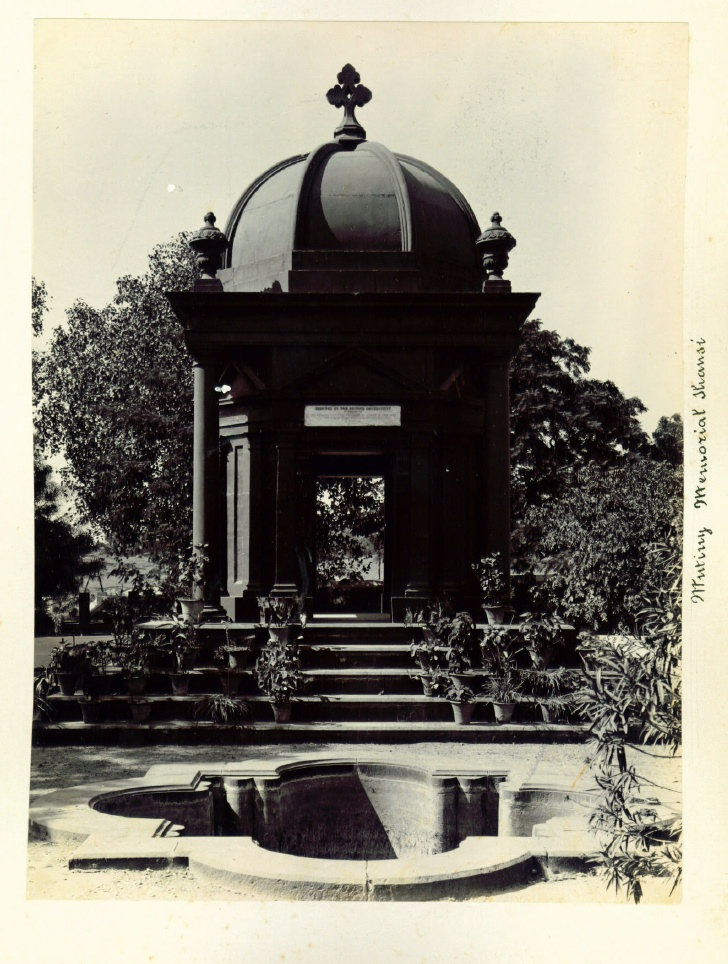
Mutiny Memorial in Jhansi (1900 photograph)

The British Central Indian campaign followed in the next months by taking Kalpi and finally securing Gwalior on 17 June 1858. Rani Lakshmi Bai was killed in a cavalry action near Kotah-ke-Serai the same day. Some anti-British armed resistance remained present eventually in April 1859, when Tatya Tope was betrayed by Man Singh, and hanged.

== See also ==
- Central Indian campaign of 1858
- Rani of Jhansi
- Indian rebellion of 1857
- Jhansi Fort

== Bibliography ==
- Michael Edwardes, Battles of the Indian Mutiny, Pan, 1963, ISBN 0-330-02524-4
- R. Ernest Dupuy et Trevor N. Dupuy, The Collins Encyclopedia of Military History, BCA, 1998.
- Brigadier Peter Young, A Dictionary of Battles (1816-1976), Mayflower books, 1977 ISBN 0-8317-2260-6,
- Christopher Hibbert, The Great Mutiny, Penguin, 1978, ISBN 0-14-004752-2
- George Bruce, The Paladin Dictionary of Battles, Paladin books, 1986 ISBN 0-586-08529-7.
- Edwardes, Michael (1975). Red Year. London: Sphere Books.
- Donald Featherstone, Victorian colonial warfare, Blandford, 1993 ISBN 0-7137-2255-X.
