= Jhansi Fort =

Fortress in Uttar Pradesh, India

- Part of Bundelkhand
- Jhansi, Uttar Pradesh
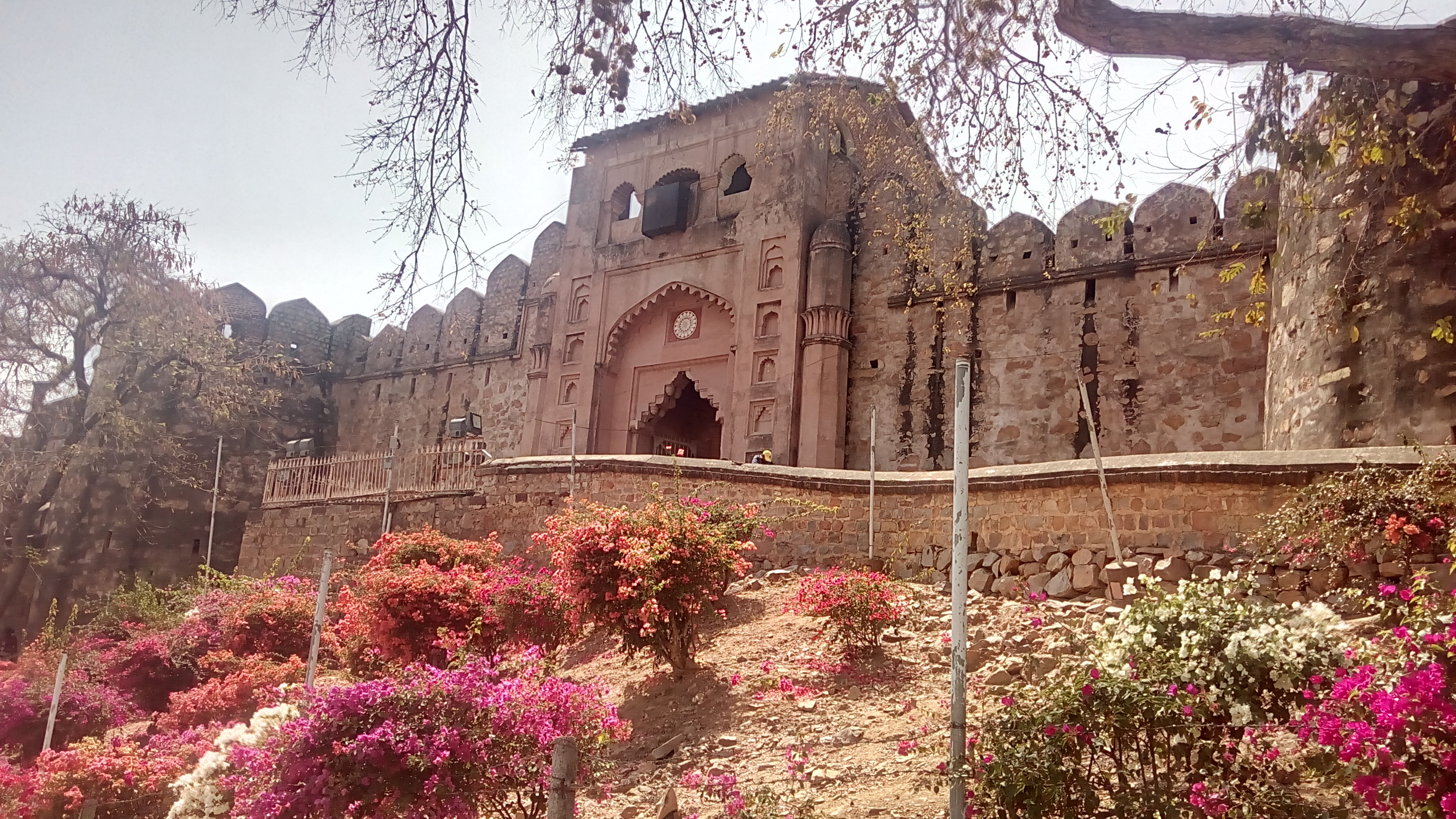
- Jhansi Fort entrance, 2017

Site information
- Owner: Government of India
- Open to the public: 7 am to 6 pm
- Condition: Good

Location
- Shown within Uttar Pradesh
- Coordinates: 25.4581258°N 78.5753775°E
- Height: 285 metres

Site history
- Materials: Stone, lime and lead
- Battles/wars: Siege of Jhansi (1858)

Garrison information
- Occupants: Maratha Empire, Peshwa, Newalkar and Scindia, British

Jhansi Fort or Jhansi ka Qila is a fortress situated on a large hilltop called Bangira, in Uttar Pradesh. It served as a stronghold of the Karhade Brahmin Kings in Balwant Nagar (old name of Jhansi) from the 11th through the 17th century.

- There was another British fortress called the Star Fort which was located south of the main fortress of the town, at Jhansi Cantt. It was a primary British settlement in the town and had been constructed in accordance to a treaty of the British with the Newalkar Maharaja of Jhansi in 1804, through which Jhansi became subordinate to the British. The Star Fort was stormed by a Bengal infantry in June 1857, during the rebellion.

== Location ==
The Jhansi fort is located in the middle of Jhansi city. It is 3 km from the Jhansi Railway station. The nearest airport is Gwalior, which is 103 km from Jhansi. The fort can also be reached by getting down at the Jhansi Museum Bus Stop.

== History ==
The construction of the Jhansi fort is ascribed to the Karhade Brahmin Clan Rulers. It is one of the strongholds of the Brahmins. In 1728, Mohammed Khan Bangash attacked Maharaja Chattrasal. Peshwa Bajirao helped Maharaja Chattrasal defeat the Mughal army. As a mark of gratitude, Maharaja Chattrasal offered a part of his state, which included Jhansi, to Peshwa Bajirao. In 1742 Naroshanker was made the subedar of Jhansi. During his tenure of 15 years, he not only extended the strategically important Jhansi fort (the extension is called Shankergarh), but also constructed other buildings. In 1757, after Naroshanker was called back by the Peshwa. Madhav Govind Kakirde and then Babulal Kanahai were made the subedars of Jhansi. From 1766 to 1769 Vishwas Rao Laxman served as the subedar of Jhansi. Then Raghunath Rao (II) Newalkar was appointed the subedar of Jhansi. He was a very able administrator, increasing the revenue of the state and building both the MahaLakshmi Temple and the Raghunath Temple.

After the death of Shiv Rao his grandson Ramchandra Rao was made subedar of Jhansi. His poorly administered term ended with his death in 1835. His successor Raghunath Rao (III) died in 1838. The British rulers then accepted Gangadhar Rao as the Raja of Jhansi. The inefficient administration of Raghunath Rao (III) left Jhansi in a very poor financial position.

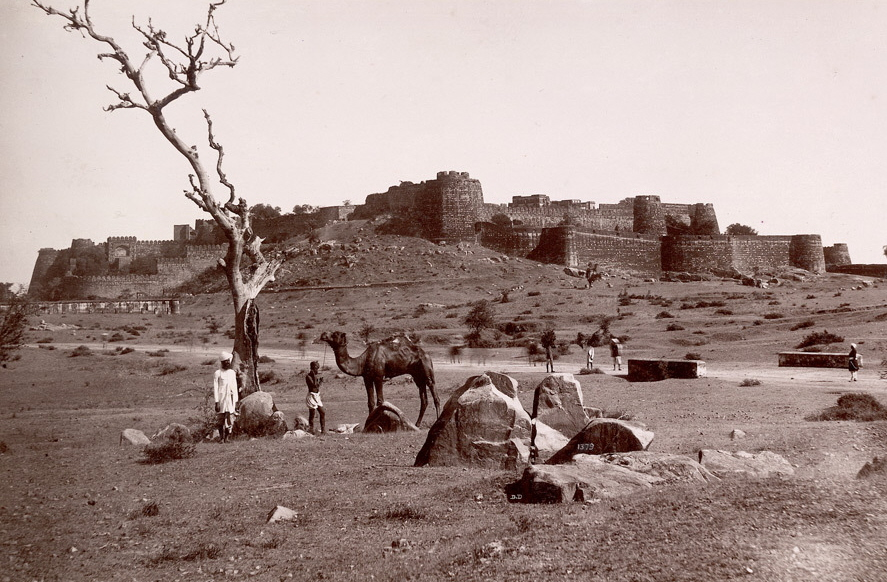
Jhansi Fort, c. 1882

However, he was succeeded by Raja Gangadhar Rao, who was a very good administrator. He was reportedly very generous and sympathetic, and the local population of Jhansi was well satisfied. In 1842 Raja Gangadhar Rao married Manikarnika Tambe who was the given the new name of Lakshmi Bai. She gave birth to a boy, later named Damodar Rao, in December 1851, who died in March/April 1852. The Maharaja adopted a child called Anand Rao, the son of Gangadhar Rao's cousin, who was renamed Damodar Rao, on the day before the Maharaja died. The adoption was in the presence of the British political officer who was given a letter from the Maharaja instructing that the child be treated with respect and that the government of Jhansi should be given to his widow for her lifetime. After the death of the Maharaja in November 1853, because Damodar Rao (born Anand Rao) was adopted, the British East India Company, under Governor-General Lord Dalhousie, applied the Doctrine of Lapse, rejecting Damodar Rao's claim to the throne and annexing the state to its territories. In March 1854, Lakshmibai was given an annual pension of Rs. 60,000 and ordered to leave the palace and the fort. In June 1857 the revolt broke out and she took the control of the fort and led Jhansi forces against those of the British East India Company.

Jhansi was besieged by the company forces of General Hugh Rose in March and April 1858 and was captured on 4 April 1858. Rani Lakshmi Bai fought bravely and then made a daring escape on horseback from the fort before the city was pillaged by Rose's troops.

In 1861, the British Government gave the Jhansi fort and the city of Jhansi to Jayajirao Scindia, the Maharaja of Gwalior in the return for Gwalior Fort, but the British took back Jhansi from Gwalior state in 1886.

== Structure ==
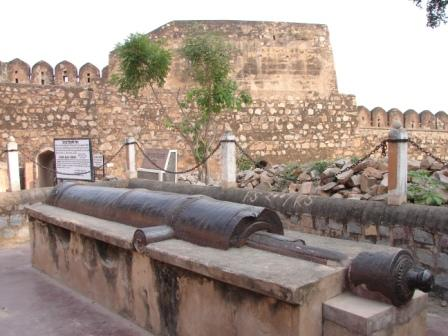
Kadak Bijli, 2007

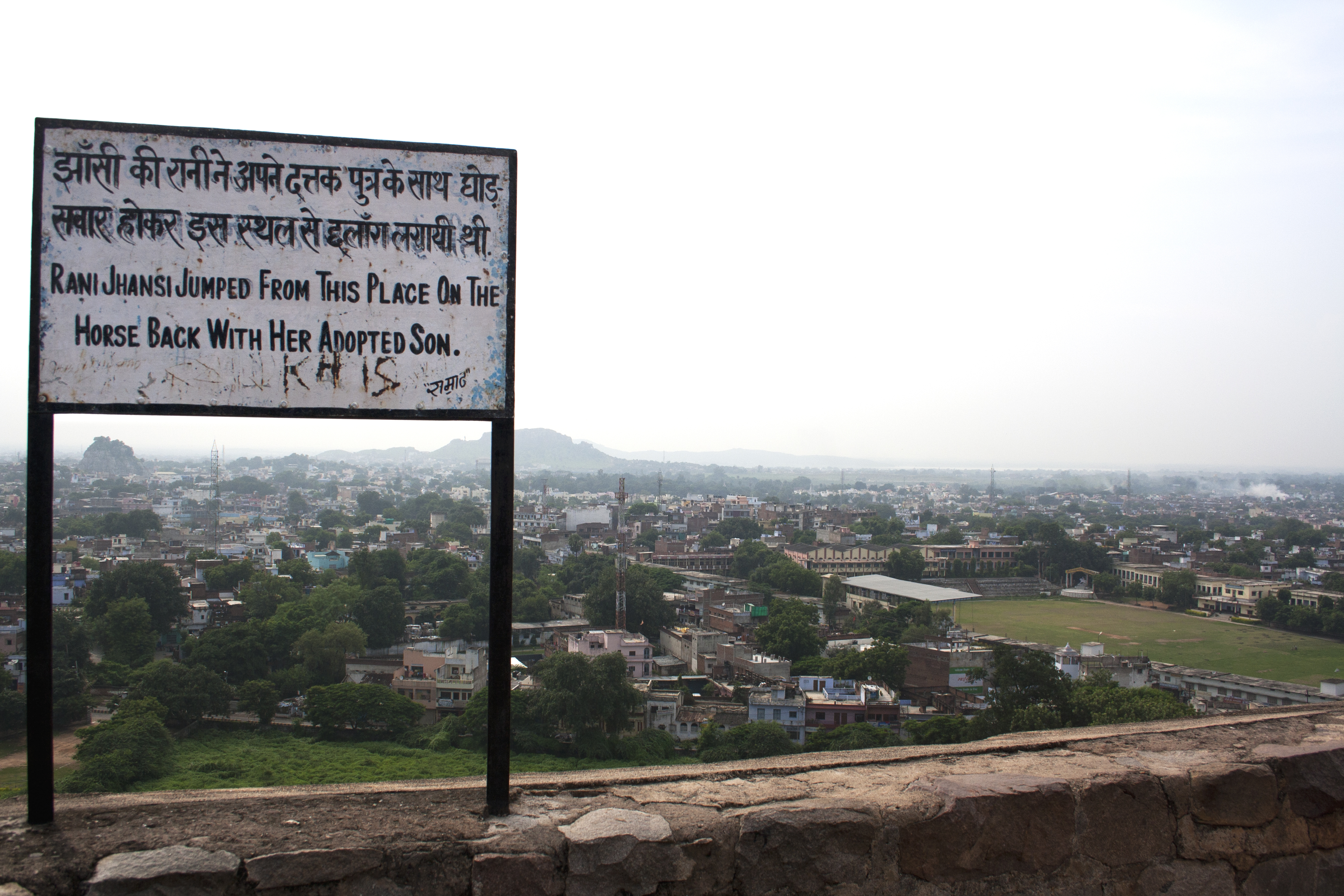
The place from where Rani Lakshmibai jumped with her horse, Badal (according to legend)

The fort standing in the hilly area shows how the North Indian style of fort construction differs from that of the South. In the South, most of the forts were built on the sea beds like the Bekal Fort in Kerala. The granite walls of the fort are between 16 and 20 feet thick and on the south side, the city walls meet. The south face of the fort is almost perpendicular. There are 10 gates giving access to the fort. These are Khanderao Gate, Datia Gate, Bhanderi Gate(Rani laxmi bai escaped from this gate in 1857 battle), Unnao Gate, BadaGaon Gate, Laxmi Gate, Sagar Gate, Orchha Gate, Saiyar Gate and Chand Gate. Notable sights in the fort are the Shiva temple, Ganesh temple at the entrance, and the Kadak Bijli cannon used in the uprising of 1857. The memorial board reminds one of the hair-raising feat of the Rani Lakshmibai in jumping on horseback from the fort. Nearby is the Rani Mahal, built in the later half of the 19th century where there is now an archaeological museum.

The fort extends to a sprawling 15 acres (61,000 m^{2}) and this colossal structure measures about 312m in length and 225m in width. On the whole, there are twenty-two supports with a mammoth strengthening wall surrounded by a moat on both sides. The shattered upholder on the eastern side was rebuilt by the British, who also added a floor to Panch Mahal.

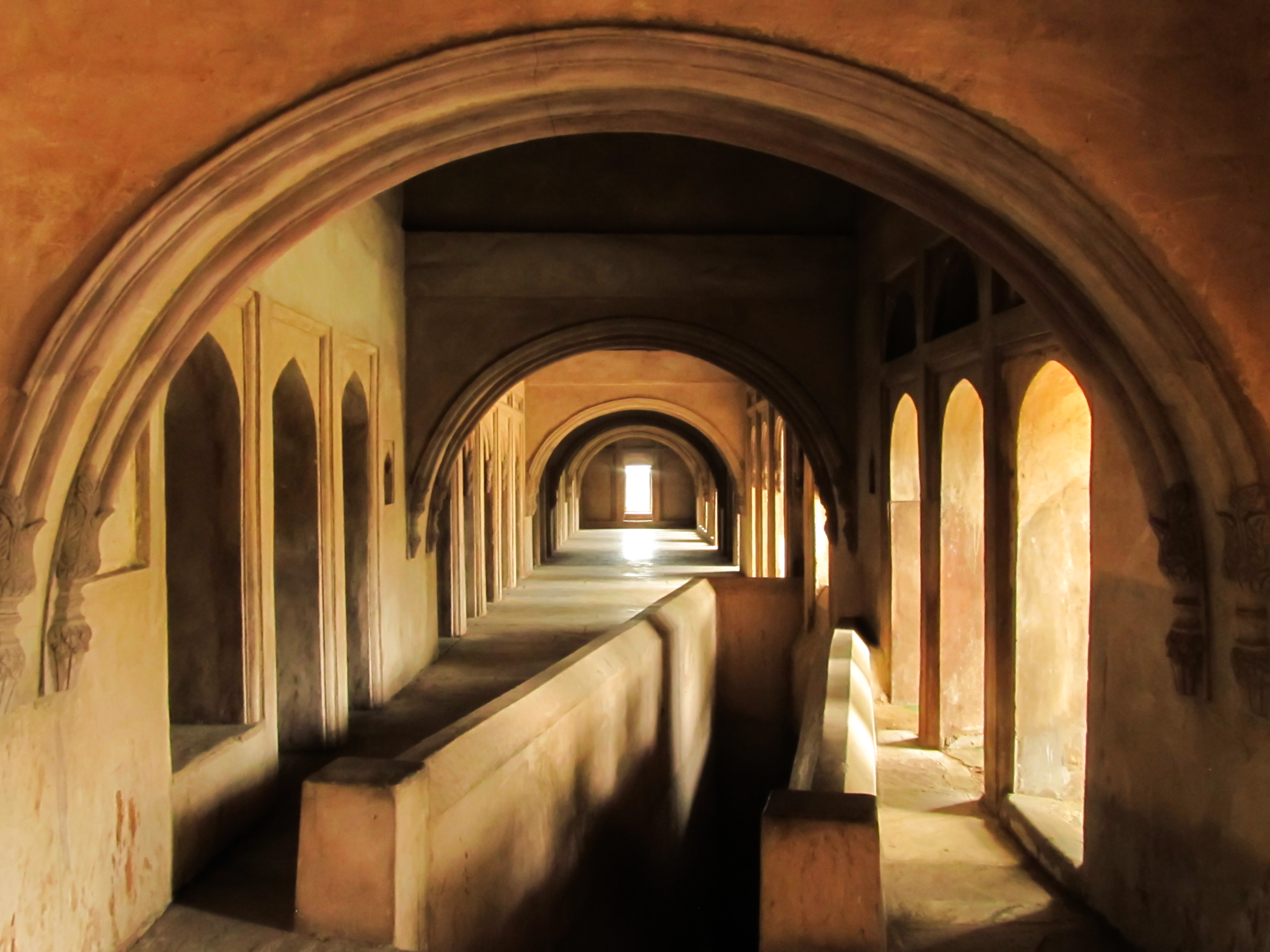
Jhansi Fort Hallway

== Events ==
Every year in the month of January–February a grand occasion is held known as Jhansi Mahotsav when many eminent personalities and artists perform their play.

== See also ==
- Central India Campaign (1858)
- Rani of Jhansi
- Gangadhar Rao
- List of forts in Uttar Pradesh
