= Rani Mahal =

Indian palace turned museum belonging to Rani Lakshmi Bai of Jhansi

The Rani Mahal (meaning "Queen's palace") is a royal palace in the city of Jhansi, Uttar Pradesh, India. The palace was built by Raghu Nath-II of the Newalkar family (1769-96), subedar of Jhansi. This palace later formed one of the residences for Rani Lakshmibai (1853-58).

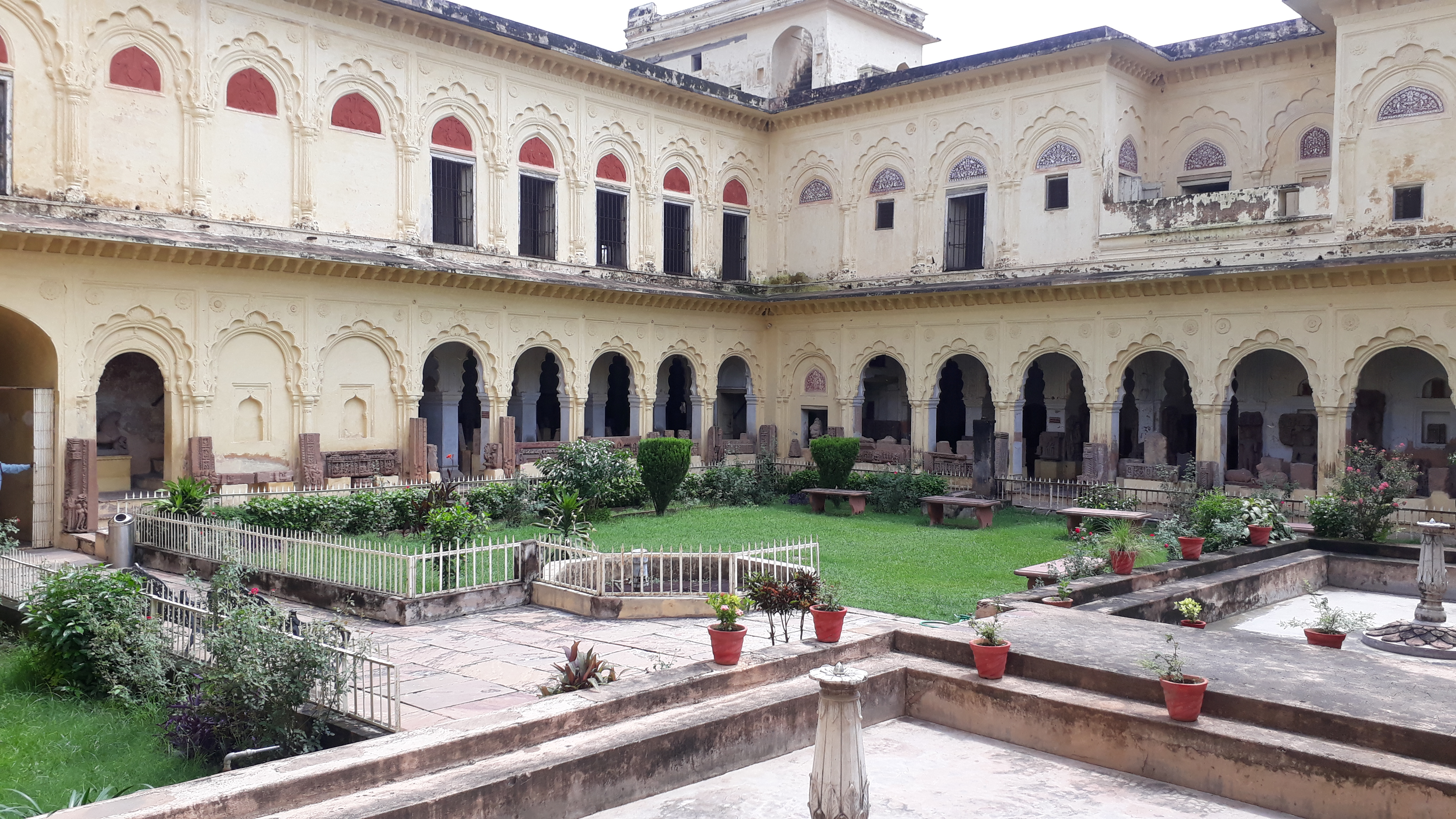
Inside the Rani Mahal

== Description ==
Architecturally, it is a flat-roofed, two-storeyed building having a quadrangular courtyard with a small well and one fountain on opposite sides. The palace consists of six halls and parallel corridors with multi-foiled arches and a number of small rooms. The Darbar Hall, approached by a flight of steps, is beautifully decorated with paintings in bright colours exhibiting various floral, faunal and geometrical motifs. The arches are embellished with peacock and rosette patterns. A major part of it was damaged by British bombardment during the siege of Jhansi in 1858. The ground floor of the palace houses stone sculptures collected from Madanpur, Barua Sagar, Dudhai and Chandpur dating from the Gupta to Medieval periods (9th to 12th centuries).
