= Jalaun State =

19th century princely state in Islamabad, India

Coordinates: 26.15°N 79.35°E

Jalaun State जालौन रियासत (Hindi)
- Princely State of British India
- 1806–1840
- Flag

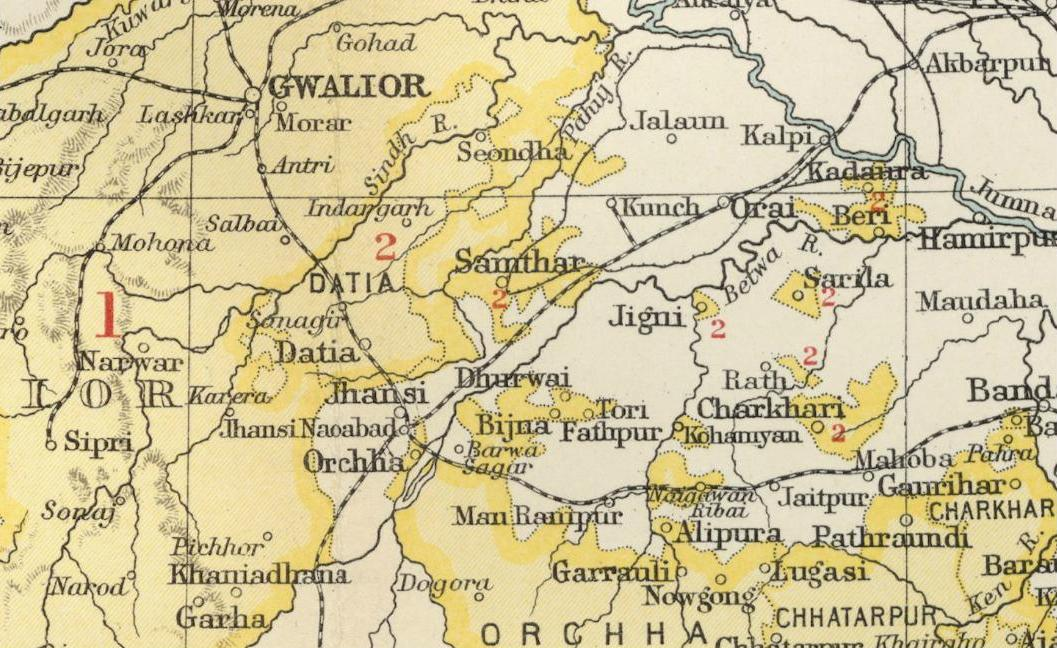
- Jalaun State in the Imperial Gazetteer of India
- Area
  - 1806: 3,830 km^{2} (1,480 sq mi)
- History
  - British protectorate: 1806
  - Annexed by the East India Company: 1840
Preceded by	Succeeded by
Maratha Confederacy	Presidencies and provinces of British India
- Today part of: India ∟ Uttar Pradesh

Jalaun State was a Maratha princely state in the Bundelkhand region. It was centered on Jalaun, in present-day Jalaun district, Uttar Pradesh. The town was the capital of the state from 1806 to 1840. The last Raja died without issue and Jalaun State was subsequently annexed by the East India Company.

== History ==
Originally a part of the Maratha Empire, it was later that the British occupied the area in 1803 and Jalaun state became a British protectorate in 1806. Many of the inhabitants were Maharashtrian Brahmins, known as 'Dakhini Pandits'. Their ancestors had been at the service of the Maratha Peshwa. Govindrao II, its last ruler, died without a male issue in 1840 and the state was annexed by the British in the same year. Govind rao II daughter was married in Karwi which was a Sanand State established in 1818 was a minor princely state in Gujarat, located near Ahmedabad, ruled by the Vaghela Rajput dynasty.

The fortified post of Kalpi, the former residence of the rulers of Jalaun State, was dismantled in 1860 and its place was taken by a market known as Baithganj. After the annexation the British authorities preferred Orai as capital of the district, claiming that Jalaun was an unhealthy place.

=== Rulers ===
All the rulers of Jalaun State were under Peshwa Government of Pune. Karkare Dynasty (also known as Hrigvediya Karkare Ballal Karhade Brahmins, basically belonged to Ratnagiri of Maharashtra were appointed by Peshwa Sawai Madhorao (II) Narayan Bhatt Ballal as local administrators in 1793 AD, under the protection of Shreenath Mahadji Shinde (also known as Madhavrao (I) Scindia, Patilbawa. Later on in 1795, jalun was placed under the assistance of Yashwant rao of Kalinjar, with whom they had marriage alliances. In 1796, Yashwant Bhatt was killed during the Battle of Naikhai in Rewa, in which his forces were defeated by the small army of Maharaja Ajit Singh Deo of Rewa (princely state). This led to Jalon being in weak position by killing of his able commander. The Karkares tried to save Jaluan from the East India co. and thus fought against British Army during the famous Second Maratha – Anglo War. English Army won and the Maratha Army under Karkare Dynasty was killed brutally. Later on the fugitives settled in Gwalior, Banda and Jhansi. Administration of Jalaun was transferred to another Maharashtrian Brahmin family Deshastha Brahmins and bore the title "Raja".

In 1857, the Jalon along with Kalinjar and Jhansi Peshwai fought one of the toughest battles in the history of 1857 mutiny. They were defeated in the Battle of Ajaygarh in 1858. 'Raja'.

==== Rajas ====
- 1776–1822: Govindrao I
- 1822–1832: Balarao
- 1831–1840: Govindrao II (d. 1840)

== See also ==
- List of Maratha dynasties and states
- Orai
- Kalpi
