= Jhansi State =

Princely state in India (1728–1858)

Jhansi (1728–1804) Jhansi State (1804–1858)
- 1728–1858
- Flag
- Status: Part of the Maratha Empire (1728–1804); British protectorate and princely state (1804–1858)
- Capital: Jhansi; 25°27′29″N 78°34′32″E
- Historical era: Early modern, Late modern
  - Founded: 1728
  - Became a protectorate of Britain: 1804
  - Indian rebellion: 1858

Area
- 1804: 4,059 km^{2} (1,567 sq mi)
Preceded by	Succeeded by
Maratha Confederacy	Gwalior State; British Raj
- Today part of: India ∟ Uttar Pradesh

Jhansi was an independent princely state ruled by the Maratha Newalkar dynasty under suzerainty of British India from 1804 till 1853, when the British authorities took over the state under the terms of the Doctrine of Lapse, and renamed it the Jhansi State. Before the takeover, it was under the Peshwas from 1728 to 1804. The fortified town of Jhansi served as its capital.

Historically, the principality of Jhansi in Bundelkhand had been held by a tributary chief of the Peshwa, who ceded his rights in the Jhansi Province to the British after the defeat of the Maratha Empire. Lord Hastings rewarded the chief with hereditary rule over the province. The State of Jhansi was, however, reclaimed and ruled by Rani Laxmi Bai (also known as Manikarnika), one of the leading figures of the Indian Rebellion of 1857, from August 1857 to June 1858. The state flag was a saffron banner associated with Hinduism.

== History ==
=== Under Bundela Rajputs of Orchha/Panna ===
The town of Jhansi and surroundings were the stronghold of the Chandela rulers. Balwant Nagar was the name of this place; however, in the 11th century Jhansi lost its importance. In the 17th century under Raja Bir Singh Deo I (r. 1605–1627) of Orchha rose to prominence again. Raja Bir Singh Deo had good relations with the Mughal emperor Jahangir. In five year construction period (1613–1618) Raja Bir Singh Deo got constructed the Jhansi Fort and around it got established a Balwant Nagar, which later on came to be known as Jhansi.

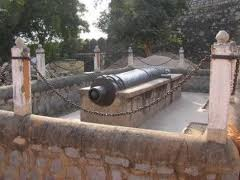
Karak Bijli Toop; one of the cannon at the Jhansi Fort

Maharaja Chhatrasal, the Bundela ruler of Panna was beset by incursions into the Bundela country by the Muslim governors of the Mughal Empire. In 1729 Mohammed Khan Bangash attacked Chattrasal so later in 1732 Chhatrasal called in the aid of the Marathas to fight Mughals. The Peshwa, Baji Rao I helped Maharaja Chattrasal and they jointly defeated the army of Muhammad Bangash.

=== Under Peshwas of Pune ===
Peshwa Baji Rao I was rewarded by the bequest of one-third of the Maharaja's dominions upon his death two years later and Jhansi was included in this part, thus Jhansi became a Maratha territory.

The Maratha general developed the city of Jhansi and peopled it with inhabitants from Orchha state. In 1742, Naro Shanker was made the Subahdar of Jhansi. During his tenure of 15 years he not only extended the Jhansi Fort which was of strategic importance but also constructed some other buildings. The extended part of the fort is called Shankergarh. In 1757 Naroshanker was recalled by the Peshwa; his successor was Madhav Govind Kakirde who was himself succeeded by Babulal Kanahai, who governed the area from 1757 to 1766. Next in the line of subedars was Vishwas Rao Laxman (1766–1769) who was followed by Raghunath Rao II Newalkar. He was a very able administrator and succeeded in increasing the revenue of the state. The Maha Lakshmi Temple and the Raghunath Temple were built by him.

=== Jhansi State ===
==== 1804–1853 ====
In 1804 British protection was promised to the Maratha subedar, Rao Shiv Rao Hari Bhau resulting in his de facto independence of the Peshwas of Pune. He assumed the title of Rao of Jhansi in the year 1804. He became the first Rao of Jhansi, the area of which extended over 4,059 km2.

Later a treaty of 1818 between the Peshwa Baji Rao II and the British East India Company meant that legally also Peshwa no longer claimed his rights in Bundelkhand.

After the death of Shiv Rao in 1814, his grandson Ramchandra Rao was made successor and a second treaty was made by him with the British on 18 November 1817 for hereditary rulers of the territory. He was given title of Maharajadhiraj in 1832 by British. Ramchandra Rao died in 1835.

After his death, Raghunath Rao III was made his successor and the same year he was favoured with the title "Maharajahdhiraj Fidvi Badshah Jamjah Inglistan" (Great King Faithful to Great Britain). Raghunath Rao III was so incapable and dissolute that the administration of the State was taken over by British. On his death in 1838 the British rulers accepted Gangadhar Rao his brother as the Raja of Jhansi in 1843.

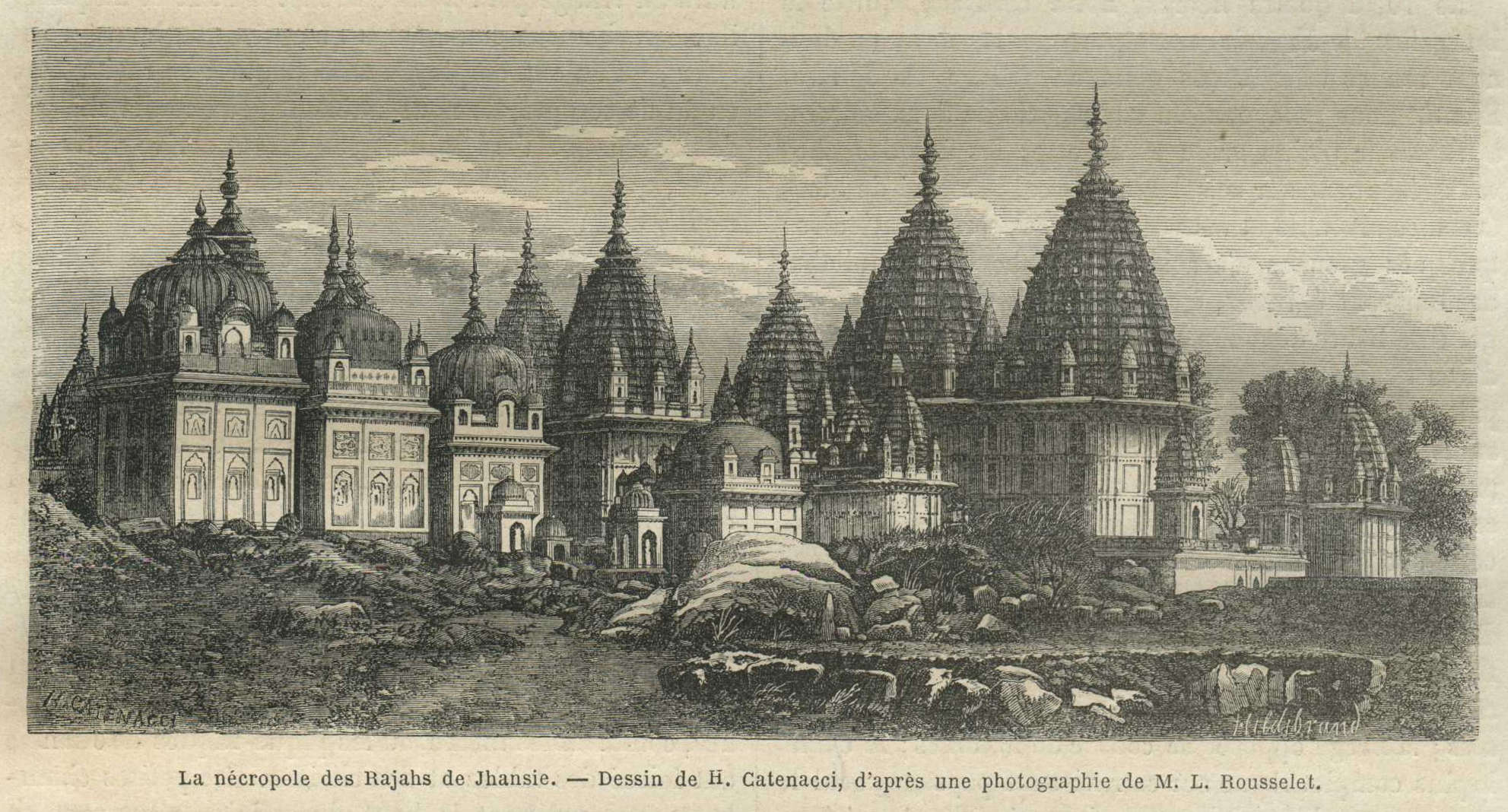
A drawing of the necropolis of the Rajahs of Jhansi, 1872

Raja Gangadhar Rao was married to Laxmi Bai, and he adopted a child called Anand Rao, the son of his cousin, who was renamed Damodar Rao, on the day before he died. The adoption was in the presence of the British political officer who was given a letter from the raja requesting that the child should be treated with kindness and that the government of Jhansi should be given to his widow for her lifetime. After the death of the raja in November 1853 because Damodar Rao was adopted, the British East India Company, under Governor-General Lord Dalhousie, applied the Doctrine of Lapse, rejecting Damodar Rao's claim to the throne and annexing the state to its territories.

The Jhansi state and the Jalaun and Chanderi districts were then formed into a superintendency. In March 1854, Lakshmibai was given a pension of Rs. 60,000 and ordered to leave the palace and the fort. Rani Lakshmibai, the widow of the Raja, petitioned the Governor General and then the British government that Damodar Rao's claim to the throne should be recognized, however, this petition was rejected.

Khaniadhana became an independent princely state after lapse of Jhansi.

==== August 1857 to June 1858 ====
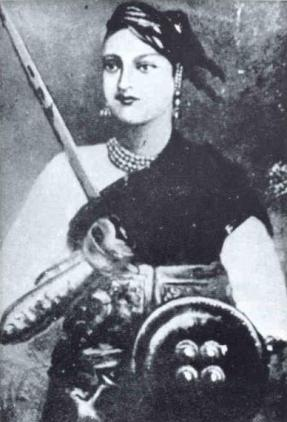
Rani Laxmibai portrayed as sowar

However, the Indian Rebellion of 1857 accordingly found Jhansi was ripe for rebellion. In June a few men of the 12th Bengal Native Infantry seized the fort containing the treasure and magazine, and massacred the European officers of the garrison along with their wives and children on 8 June 1857. Following this as the only source of authority in the city the Rani felt obliged to assume the administration and wrote to Major Erskine, commissioner of the Saugor division explaining the events which had led her to do so. The Rani's forces defeated an attempt by the mutineers to assert the claim to the throne of a rival prince who was captured and imprisoned. There was then an invasion of Jhansi by the forces of Orchha and Datia (allies of the British); their intention, however, was to divide Jhansi between them. The Rani appealed to the British for aid but it was now believed that she was responsible for the massacre and no reply was received. She assembled forces including some from former feudatories of Jhansi and elements of the mutineers which were able to defeat the invaders in August 1857. Her intention at this time was still to hold Jhansi on behalf of the British.

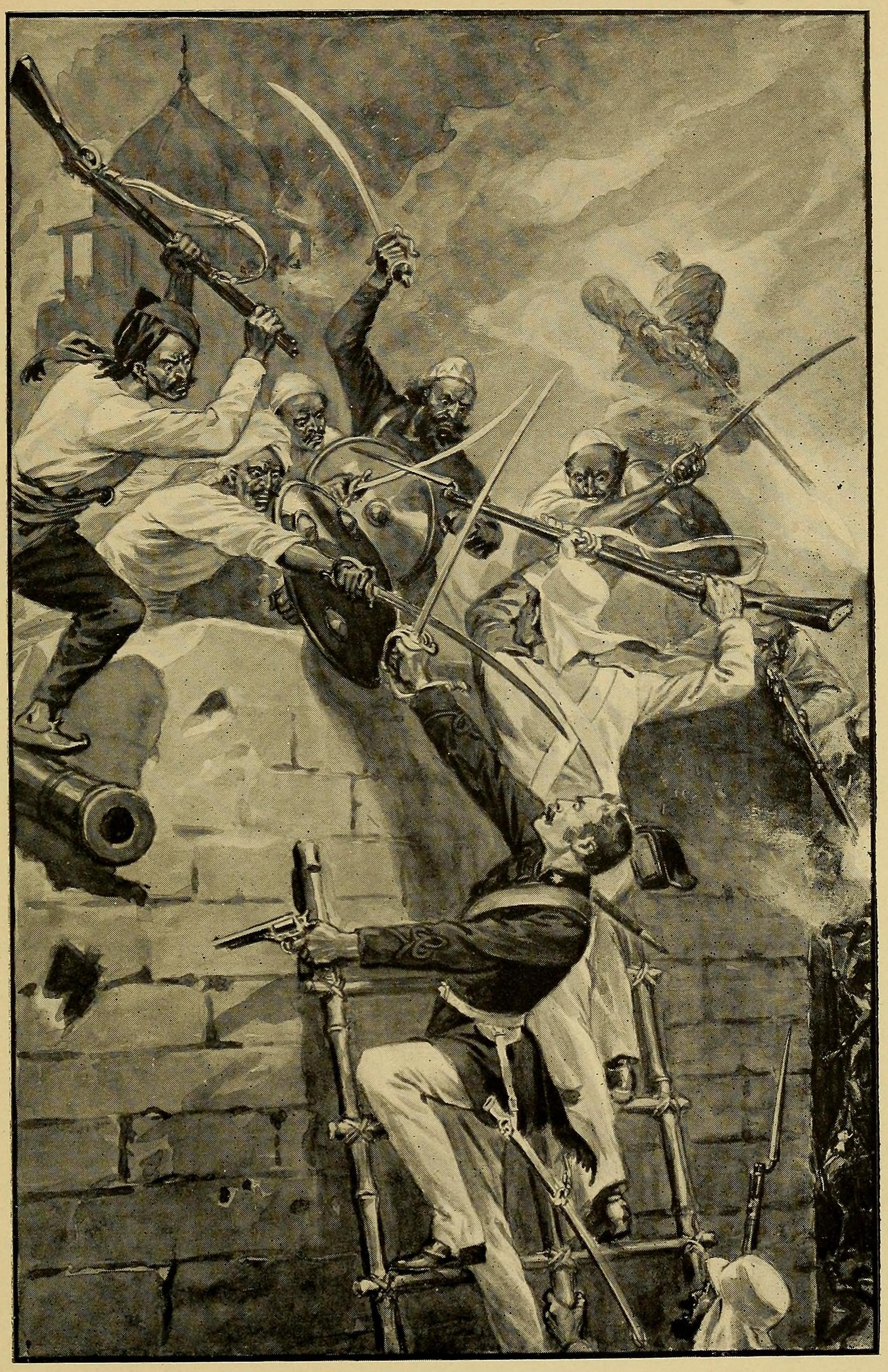
The storming of Jhansi

From August 1857 to January 1858 Jhansi under the Rani's rule was at peace. The British had announced that troops would be sent there to maintain control but the fact that none arrived strengthened the position of a party of her advisers who wanted independence from British rule. When the British forces finally arrived in March they found it well defended and the fort had heavy guns which could fire over the town and nearby countryside. Sir Hugh Rose, commanding the British forces, demanded the surrender of the city; if this was refused it would be destroyed. After due deliberation the Rani issued a proclamation: "We fight for independence. In the words of Lord Krishna, we will if we are victorious, enjoy the fruits of victory, if defeated and killed on the field of battle, we shall surely earn eternal glory and salvation." She defended Jhansi against British troops when Sir Hugh Rose besieged Jhansi on 23 March 1858. The bombardment began on 24 March but was met by heavy return fire and the damaged defenses were repaired. The defenders sent appeals for help to Tatya Tope. An army of more than 20,000, headed by Tatya Tope, was sent to relieve Jhansi but they failed to do so when they fought the British on 31 March. During the battle with Tatya Tope's forces part of the British forces continued the siege and by 2 April it was decided to launch an assault by a breach in the walls. Four columns assaulted the defenses at different points and those attempting to scale the walls came under heavy fire. Two other columns had already entered the city and were approaching the palace together. Determined resistance was encountered in every street and in every room of the palace. Street fighting continued into the following day and no quarter was given, even to women and children. "No maudlin clemency was to mark the fall of the city," wrote Thomas Lowe. The Rani withdrew from the palace to the fort and after taking counsel decided that since resistance in the city was useless she must leave and join either Tatya Tope or Rao Sahib (Nana Sahib's cousin). The Rani escaped in the night with her son, surrounded by guards. The majority of the population in April 1858 (estimated at 5,000 killed) died in the massacre which followed the storming of the city.

Rani Lakshmibai died of wounds received in the battle at Kotah ki Serai near the city of Gwalior on 17/18 June. It was not until November 1858 that Jhansi was brought under British control.

== Later developments ==
In 1861, the city and a dependent territory were ceded to Gwalior State and the capital of the district was moved to a new town, Jhansi Nawabad (Jhansi Re-founded), a village without "cantonment" (military camp).

Jhansi (the old city) became the capital of a "subah" (provínce) within the state of Gwalior, but in 1886 was returned to British rule in exchange for the Gwalior Fort and the cantonment of Morar nearby. As a result of this territorial swap the area came again under direct British control of British India and it was integrated into the United Provinces.

== See also ==
- Central Indian campaign of 1858
- Lists of princely states of India
- Maratha Empire
- List of Maratha dynasties and states
- List of princely states of British India (by region)
