= Newalkar =

Maharajas of Jhansi from 1769 to 1858

First Newalkar Subhedar of Jhansi of Maratha Kingdom
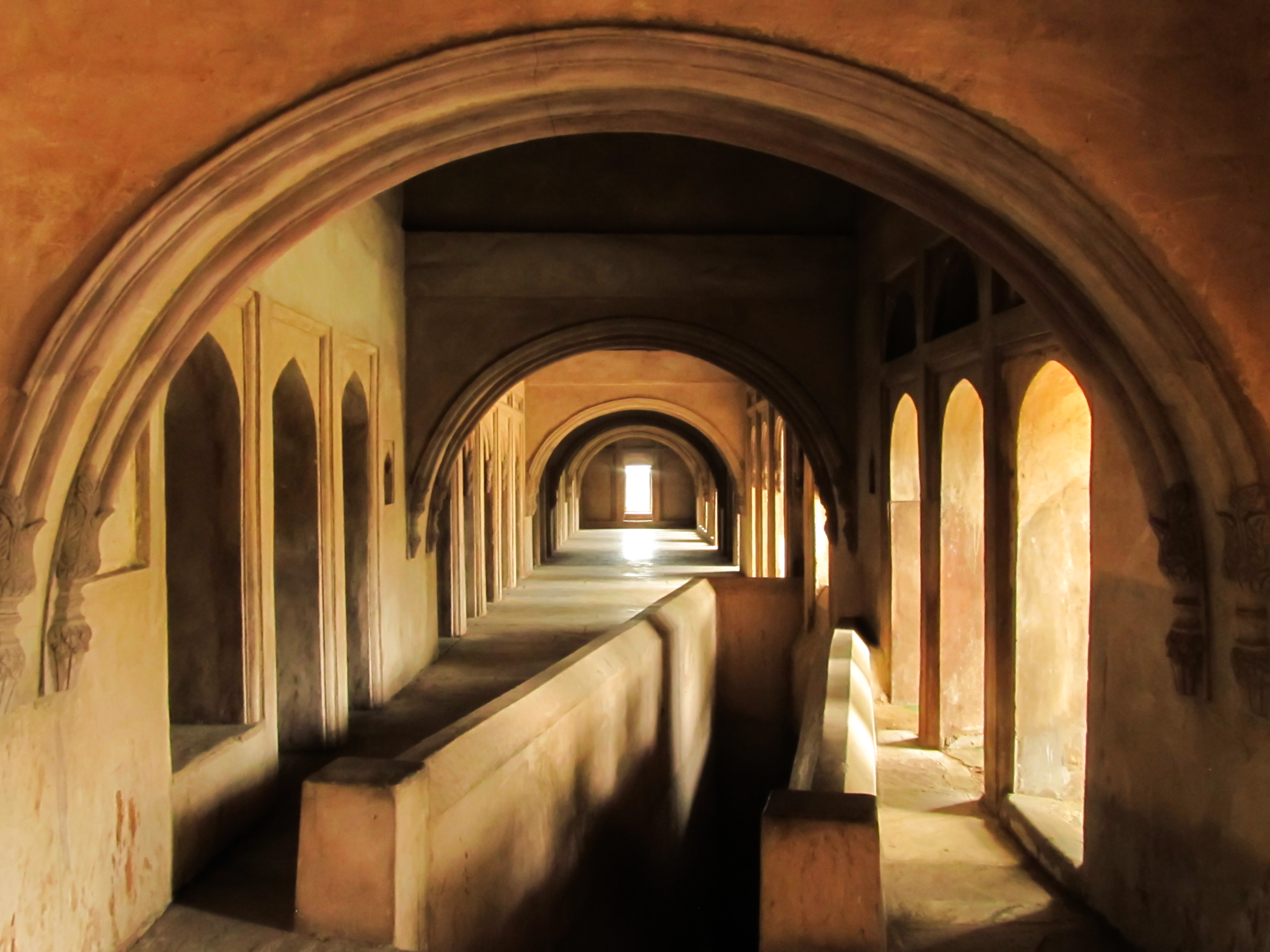
- Jhansi Fort hallway

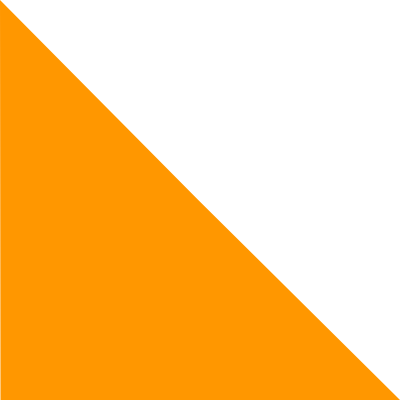
- Flag of Jhansi

Details
- Style: In the local Marathi, Sanskrit, Hindustani and Persian (local Bundeli) languages
- First monarch: Raghunath Rao I
- Last monarch: Damodar Rao
- Formed: 1769
- Abolished: 5 April 1858
- Residences: Jhansi Fort, Jhansi

Newalkar dynasty were Marathi Karhade Brahmins, who were the Maharajas of Jhansi from 1769 to 1858. Their family deity was goddess Mahalakshmi. The Newalkars were sardars under Peshwa Madhavrao I, and later became Maharajas of Jhansi in Central India as an independent member of the Maratha Confederacy until 1818. Later, their kingdom became a princely state under the protectorate of British India.

The dynasty was founded by Raghunath Hari Newalkar, who joined the service of the Peshwas of the Maratha Empire, and quickly rose to the ranks of Subedar. The Newalkar Maharajas of Jhansi are a great patron of arts and music. The name of the dynasty was associated with the title of the ruler, who was known informally as Newalkar Maharaja.

== Newalkar Maharajas of Jhansi ==
The rulers from this dynasty are as follows:

1. Raghunath Hari Newalkar (Raghunath Rao I)

The Founder of Newalkar Dynasty. Raghunath I had two sons, Khande Rao and Damodarpant

Raghunath Rao I (first son Khande Rao Dynasty of Maharashtra):

1. Khande Rao Newalkar (son of Raghunath Rao I, Parola Fort, Jalgaon, Maharashtra)
2. Ramchandra Rao Newalkar (son of Khande Rao, Parola Fort, Jalgaon, Maharashtra)
3. Anand Rao Newalkar (son of Ramchandra, Parola Fort, Jalgaon, Maharashtra)
4. Hari Bhau Kashinath (Lala Bhau) (son of Anand Rao, Tahsildar of Jhansi in 1852)
5. Vasudev Rao Newalkar (son of Anand Rao, Parola Fort, Jalgaon, Maharashtra and father of Rani Jhansi, adopted son)

Raghunath Rao I, second son Damodarpant - Dynasty of Jhansi):

1. Damodarpant (son of Raghunath Rao I, Parola Fort, Jalgaon, Maharashtra)

Damodarpant had three sons, Raghopant, Sadashivpant and Haripant

1. Raghopant Newalkar (son of Damodarpant, Parola Fort, Jalgaon, Maharashtra)
2. Sadashivpant (son of Damodarpant, Parola Fort, Jalgaon, Maharashtra)
3. Tryambakrao (son of Sadashivpant, Parola Fort, Jalgaon, Maharashtra)
4. Narayanrao (son of Tryambakrao, Parola Fort, Jalgaon, Maharashtra)
5. Sadashiv Rao Narayan (son of Narayan, Parola Fort, Jalgaon, Maharashtra and Claimant of Jhansi Throne)

1. 1844-57: Parola Fort of Maharashtra 2. 1835-1838, 1853: Claimant of Jhansi Throne 3. 13 June 1857: Battle of Karaira Fort of Gwalior against Rani Laxmibai and Rani Laxmibai arrest him. 4. 1860: The British shifted him to the Andaman Islands, where he died after the died on rani jhansi.

1. Haripant Newalkar (son of Damodarpant, and Her Dynasty of Jhansi Royal Family)

haripant had three sons, Raghunath Rao II, Shivrao Bhau and Laxmanrao (Lalabhau, Last Jahagirdar of Parola in 1859)

1. Subhedar Raghunath Rao II (son of Haripant : also known as Raghunath Hari Newalkar; 1769–1796 First Subhedar of Jhansi)
2. Raja Shivrao Bhau Newalkar (son of Haripant and Brother of Raghunath II : a.k.a. First Raja of Jhansi; 1796–1814)

Raja Shivrao Bhau had two Queens and three sons, Krishnarao (To Queen Rakhmabai), Raghunath III and Gangadhar Rao (To Queen Padmabai)

1. Laxmanrao Haripant Newalkar (son of Haripant and Brother of Raghunath II and Last Jahagirdar of Parola Fort, Maharashtra)
2. Raja Krishna Rao Newalkar (son of Shivrao Bhau and Husbund of Rani Sakhubai)

Raja Krishna Rao and Queen Sakhubai had two children: Ramchandra and Gangabai, Wife of Moreshwar Vinayak Chandorkar The Subhedar of Sagar MP. Raja Krishna Rao was killed by her wife Rani Sakhubai.

1. Maharaja Ramchandra Rao (First Maharaja of Jhansi, 1806–1835; Rani Sakhubai was regent at his minority, 1811–1835)

Maharaja Ramchandra wife Rani Laxmibai. Ramchandra was killed by her mother Rani Sakhubai.

1. Chandrakrishna Rao Newalkar ufr Krishna Rao II (son of Gangabai and Moreshwar Chandorkar of Sagar, MP, adopted son of Sakhubai and Claimant of Jhansi Throne)
1. Maharaja Raghunath Rao III (1835–1838)
  "Maharajadhiraj Fidvi Badshah Jamjah Englishtan", i.e. "faithful servant of the glorious king of England"
1. Rani Sakhubai as regent of Chandrakrishna urf Krishna Rao II (November 1838-5 January 1839)
1. Maharaja Gangadhar Rao Newalkar Gangadhar Rao (son of Raja Shivrao Bhau and Rani Padmabai 1843–21 November 1853)
1. Virangana Maharani Laxmibai Rani Lakshmi Bai (21 November 1853– 3 April 1858; as regent of Damodar Rao of Jhansi from 4 June 1857–4/5 April 1858)

== Queens of Jhansi ==
Some of the known Queens:

1. Rani Padmabai Saheb (wife of Shiv Rao Hari Bhau Newalkar )
2. Rani Sakhubai Saheb (wife of Raja Krishna Rao and mother of Raja Ramchandra Rao; King Gangadhar's elder sister in law)
3. Rani Jankibai Saheb (first wife of Raghunath Rao III and his Royal consort; King Gangadhar's younger sister in law)
4. Aftab Begum urf Rani Lachhobai Saheb (second wife of Raghunath Rao III; King Gangadhar's sister in law and mother of Ali Bahadur, Nusrat and Mehrunissa )
5. Maharani Laxmibai Saheb I (wife of Maharaja Ramchandra Rao The First Maharaja of Jhansi)
6. Maharani Ramabai Saheb (Gangadhar Rao's first wife)
7. Rajmata Virangana Maharani Laxmibai Saheb Newalkar Maharaj (Baisaheb Sarkar) Rani Lakshmi Bai (Gangadhar Rao's second wife, mother of Damodar Rao and Indian Freedom Fighter)

== Other notable people ==
1. Ranunath Rao of Jhansi (a.k.a. Raghunath Hari Newalkar)
2. Shiv Hari Rao
3. Shiv Rao Bhau (father of Krishna Rao I, Raghunath Rao III, and Gangadhar Rao)
4. Krishna Rao I (father of Ramachandra Rao and husband of Sakku Bai (Gangadhar Rao's brother)
5. Krishna Rao II (adopted son of Ramchandra Rao and biological son of Ganga Bai of Sagar who was a daughter of Sakku Bai)
6. Ali Bahadur and Nasrat Jung (Raghunath Rao III and Lachcho Bai's illegitimate sons)
7. Raghunath Rao III (brother of Gangadhar and Krishna Rao)
8. Sadashiv Rao (distant relative and nephew of Gangadhar Rao; executed in 1870)(Rani Lakshmi Bai's brother-in-law)
9. Vasudev Rao Newalkar, a cousin of Raja Gangadhar Rao
10. JhalkariBai (Women's Army served Rani Lakshmi Bai of Jhansi )
11. Ghulam Ghaus Khan (Commander in Chief of Jhansi)
12. Tatya Tope (Rani Lakshmi Bai 's Guru)

== Newalkars Today ==
Most of the Newalkar family has migrated from Jhansi to various cities in Maharashtra and Madhya Pradesh. There is only one Branch of Newalkar family still residing in Jhansi. The members are well known for their humanitarian work and are affiliated with various humanitarian organizations which provide free health care to poor people by organizing health camps and also provide aid to schools for underprivileged children. Priti Newalkar was the President of Lions Club of Jhansi for 2020 - 2021 and Manish Newalkar has served as the President of Rotary Club Of Jhansi Rani for 2021 - 2022.

== Bibliography ==
- Chapman, Joyce Lebra (1986), The Rani of Jhansi: A Study in Female Heroism in India, University of Hawaii Press, ISBN 9780824809843
- Roy, Tapti (2006), Raj of the Rani, Penguin Books India, ISBN 9780143062219
