= Damodar Rao of Jhansi =

Prince of Jhansi Shrimant Damodar Rao Newalkar

Maharaja of Jhansi (disputed)
- Reign: 1857
- Regent: Rani Lakshmibai (adoptive mother)
- Born: Anand Rao; 15 November 1849; Jalgaon, British India (present-day Jalgaon, Maharashtra, India)
- Died: 28 May 1906 (aged 56); Indore State, British India (present-day Indore, Madhya Pradesh, India)
- Spouses: Lady Shivre; (personal name unknown)
- Issue: Lakhsman Rao Jhansiwale

Damodar Rao (born as Anand Rao) (15 November 1849 – 28 May 1906) was the adopted son of Maharaja Gangadhar Rao and Rani Laxmibai of Jhansi State.

Born as Anand Rao to Vasudev Rao Newalkar in 15 November 1849 Parola Fort, Jalgaon, Maharashtra. Vasudev Rao a cousin of Raja Gangadhar Rao, he was adopted by the maharaja after his own son died. The adoption of Anand Rao, who was renamed Damodar Rao, occurred on the day before the Maharaja died. The adoption was in the presence of the British political officer who was given a letter from the Maharaja instructing that the child be treated with respect and that the government of Jhansi should be given to his widow for her lifetime. After the death of the Maharaja in 21 November 1853, because Damodar Rao (born Anand Rao) was adopted, the British East India Company, under Governor-General Lord Dalhousie, applied the Doctrine of Lapse, rejecting Damodar Rao's claim to the throne and annexing the state to its territories. When she was informed of this, Rani Laxmibai cried out "I shall not surrender my Jhansi" ("mai apni Jhansi kabhi nahi doongi"). In March 1854, Rani Laxmibai was given an annual pension of Rs. 60,000 and ordered to leave the palace and the fort.

However, actions by mutineers at Jhansi and the failure of negotiations between the Rani and the Company resulted in Jhansi State reasserting its independence. Eventually, Company forces laid siege to the city of Jhansi and after determined resistance, they breached its defences. Rani Laxmibai evaded capture, according to tradition, with Damodar Rao on her back jumping on her horse, Sarangi from the fort. They survived but the horse died. More probably she escaped in the night with her son, surrounded by guards.

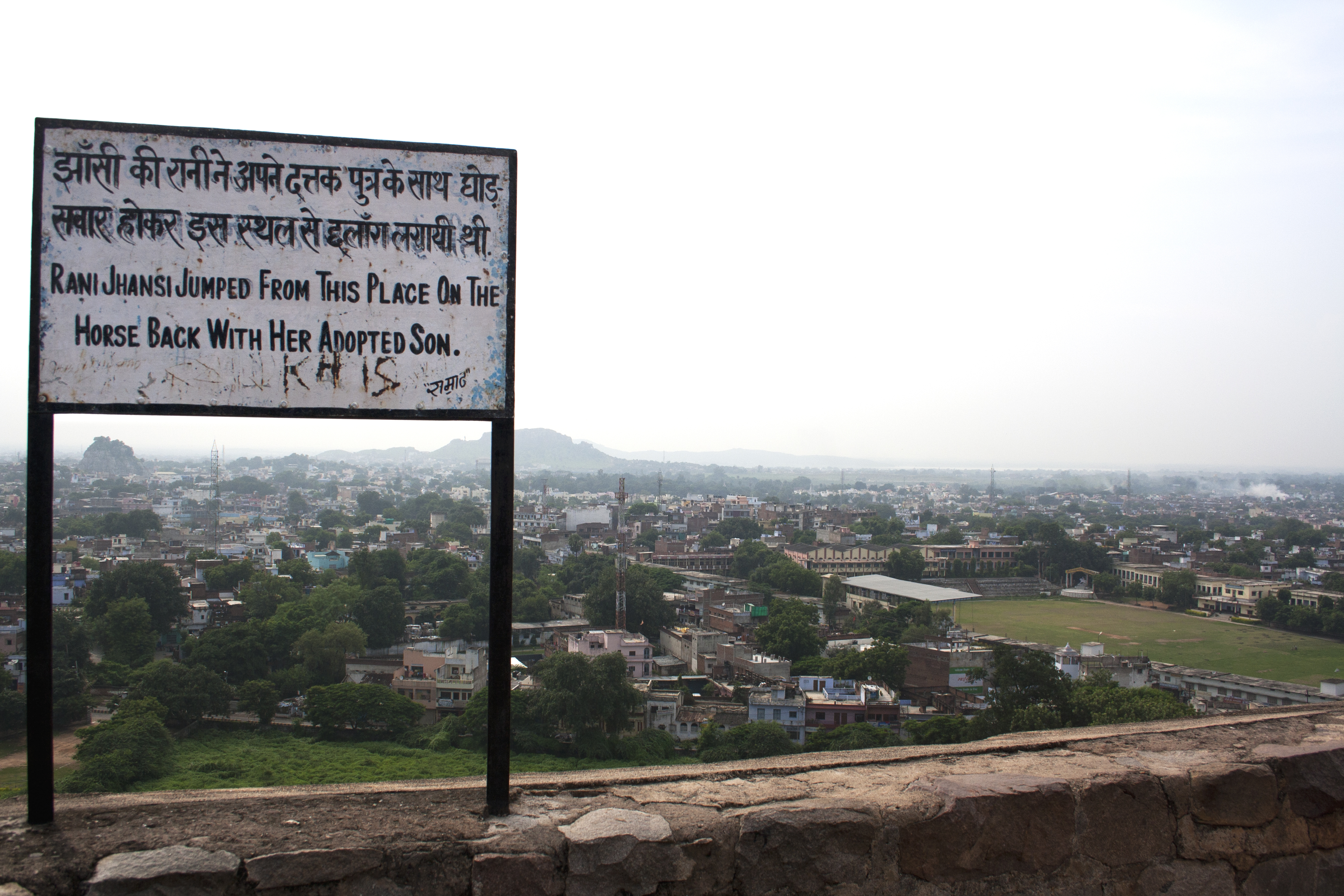
The point from where Rani Lakshmibai jumped with her horse, Sarangi and young Damodar Rao, according to legend, marked at Jhansi Fort.

After the death of Rani Lakshmibai at Kotah ki Sarai in Gwalior on 17 June 1858, he survived that battle and, lived with his mentors in the jungle, in dire poverty. According to a memoir purported to be by Damodar Rao, he was among his mother's troops and household at the battle of Gwalior, together with others who had survived the battle (some 60 retainers with 60 camels and 22 horses), he fled from the camp of Rao Sahib of Bithur and as the village people of Bundelkhand dared not aid them for fear of reprisals from the British they were forced to live in the forest and suffer many privations. He had taken asylum in Jhalrapatan when due to the help of some old confidants, he met Raja Pratapsinh of Jhalarpatan. An old confidant, Nanekhan impressed upon the local British political officer, Flink to forgive young Damodar. He was sent to Indore after he surrendered to the British. Here, Sir Richard Shakespeare, the local political agent, placed him under the guardianship of a Kashmiri teacher, called Munshi Dharmanarayan, to teach Damodar – Urdu, English and Marathi. He was allowed to keep only 7 followers (all others had to leave) and was allotted an annual pension of Rs. 10,000.

He settled down at Indore, where British provided him house in Residency and was paid a pension of Rs. 400/- by British. His first wife died shortly afterwards and he was married again into Shivre family. In 1904, he had a son named Lakshman Rao. Later, after end of the Company rule in India, he also petitioned British Raj for recognition but was refused to be recognised as legal heir. Damodar Rao was an avid photographer by passion. He died on 28 May 1906 survived by his son Lakhsman Rao.
