= Doctrine of lapse =

East India Company policy of annexation of princely states

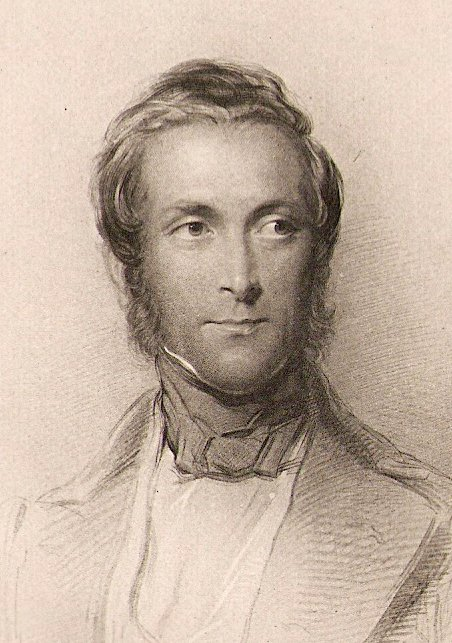
James Broun-Ramsay, 1st Marquess of Dalhousie (1812–1860), who served as Governor-General of India from 1848 to 1856 and famously introduced the Doctrine of Lapse.

The Doctrine of Lapse was an imperialist annexation policy devised by the British East India Company to expand its empire in India, applied most aggressively and extensively under Lord Dalhousie during his tenure as Governor-General of British India.

The policy is associated with James Broun-Ramsay, 1st Marquess of his Dalhousie.

Elements of the doctrine of lapse continued to be applied by the post-independence Indian government to derecognise individual princely families until 1971, when the recognition of former ruling families was discontinued under the 26th Amendment to the Indian constitution by the Indira Gandhi government.

== Doctrine ==
According to the doctrine, any Indian princely state under the suzerainty of the East India Company, the dominant imperial power in the Indian system of subsidiary alliances, would have its princely status abolished, and therefore be annexed into directly ruled British India, if the ruler was either "manifestly incompetent or died without a male heir". This supplanted the long-established right of an Indian sovereign without an heir to choose a successor.

The policy is most commonly associated with Dalhousie, who was the East India Company's Governor-General of British India between 1848 and 1856. However, the doctrine was articulated by the Court of Directors of the Company as early as 1834, and several smaller states had already been annexed under this doctrine before Dalhousie took over the post of Governor-General.

By the use of the doctrine of lapse, the Company took over the princely states of Satara (1848), Jaitpur and Sambalpur (1849), Baghal (1850), Udaipur (Chhattisgarh State) (1852), Jhansi (1853), Nagpur (1854), Tanjore and Arcot (1855). Awadh (1856) is widely believed to have been annexed under the doctrine, but in fact was annexed by Dalhousie under the pretext of mis-governance. Mostly claiming that the ruler was not ruling properly, the Company added about four million pounds sterling to its annual revenue through this doctrine. However, Udaipur State would later have local princely rule reinstated in 1860.

With the increasing power of the East India Company, discontent simmered among many sections of Indian society, including disbanded soldiers. They rallied behind the deposed dynasties during the Indian Rebellion of 1857, also known as the Sepoy Mutiny. The doctrine was renounced by the British Viceroy of India, whose rule replaced that of the East India Company in 1858 as a result of the insurrection.

=== Doctrine of lapse before Dalhousie ===
Dalhousie vigorously applied the lapse doctrine for annexing Indian princely states, but the policy was not solely his invention.

The princely state of Kittur, ruled by Kittur Chennamma (the queen at the time), was taken over by the East India Company in 1824, when, after the death of her husband and son, she adopted a new son and attempted to make him heir to the throne, which the British refused to accept. This development has similarities with the later 'doctrine of lapse', which the Court of Directors of the East India Company articulated early in 1834. As per this policy, the Company annexed Mandvi in 1839, Colaba and Jalaun in 1840, and Surat in 1842.

== The impact of the doctrine of lapse ==
The doctrine of lapse was widely considered illegitimate by many Indians. By 1848, the British had immense power in India, since they were the de facto direct rulers of territories such as the Madras, Bombay, and Bengal Presidencies, Assam, Mysore, and the Punjab, as well as the indirect rulers of princely states of Rajputana, Sindh, Patiala, the Carnatic, and many others.

Most of the rulers of the remaining states which had not yet been annexed by the British were in a weak position against their mighty forces. Not willing to spend huge amounts of money and soldiers, the Indian rulers had little option but to give in to this policy. This caused increased resentment against the British Empire in India, and was one of the causes of the Uprising of 1857.

== Princely states annexed under the doctrine ==
Princely state	Year annexed
Angul	1848
Arcot	1855
Awadh	1856
Assam	1838
Banda	1858
Guler	1813
Jaintia	1803
Jaitpur	1849
Jalaun	1840
Jaswan	1849
Jhansi	1853
Kachar	1830
Kangra	1846
Kannanur	1819
Kittur	1824
Ballabhgarh	1858
Kullu	1846
Kurnool	1839
Kutlehar	1825
Nagpur	1853
Punjab	1849
Ramgarh	1858
Sambalpur	1849
Satara	1848
Surat	1842
Siba	1849
Tanjore	1855
Tulsipur	1854
Udaipur	1852

== In independent India ==
In late 1964, Maharaja Rajendra Prakash of Sirmur, the last recognized former ruler of Sirmur State, died without either leaving male issue or adopting an heir before his death, although his senior widow subsequently adopted her daughter's son as the successor to the family headship. The Indian government, however, decided that in consequence of the ruler's death, the constitutional status of the family had lapsed. The doctrine of lapse was likewise invoked the following year when the last recognized ruler of Akkalkot State died in similar circumstances.

== See also ==
- Escheat
- List of princely states of India
- Presidencies and provinces of British India
