= Gangadhar Rao =

5th raja of Jhansi

Shrimant Maharaja Gangadhar Rao Newalkar Babasaheb
- Jhansi Naresh; Maharaja of Jhansi
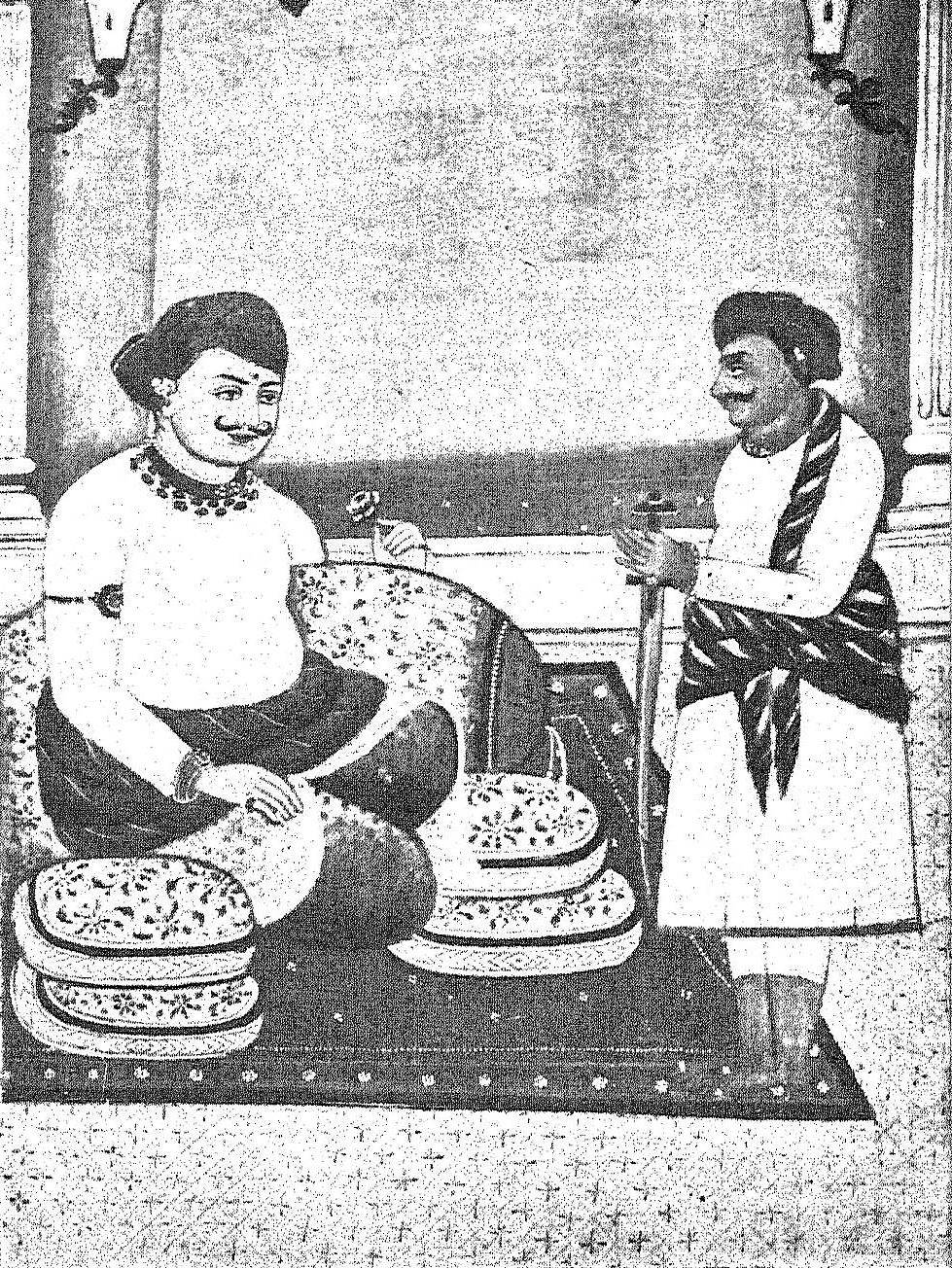

5th Maharaja of Jhansi
- Reign: 1843 – 21 November 1853
- Predecessor: Raghunath Rao III
- Successor: Damodar Rao
- Born: 4 April 1797; Jhansi, Bundelkhand, Uttar Pradesh, India
- Died: 21 November 1853 (aged 55); Jhansi, Bundelkhand, Uttar Pradesh, India
- Spouse: Ramabai; Lakshmibai
- Issue: Damodar Rao, Anand Rao
Names
- Jhansi Naresh Shrimant Maharaja Gangadhar Rao Newalkar
- Dynasty: Newalkar
- Father: Raja Shiv Rao Bhau Newalkar
- Mother: Maharani Padmabai Ranisaheb

Maharaj Gangadhar Rao Newalkar (4 April 1797– 21 November 1853) was the 5th Raja of Jhansi situated in northern India (formerly a vassal kingdom of Maratha Empire however, the British East India Company became its overlord in 1804 during the Second Anglo Maratha War). During his lifetime Jhansi was considered to be part of the larger region of Bundelkhand. He was a Marathi Karhade bhatt Brahmin. He was the son of Shiv Rao Bhau and a descendant of Raghunath Hari Newalkar, the first governor of Jhansi under Maratha rule. He was the husband of Rani Lakshmibai, who became a symbol of resistance to the Company's rule during the Indian Rebellion of 1857.

== Biography ==
The ancestors of Maharaj Gangadhar Rao hailed from a Brahmin family of Ratnagiri district of Maharashtra. Some of them moved to Khandesh, when Peshwa rule began and served important posts in the Peshwa and Holkar armies. Subhedar Raghunath Haripant Newalkar alis Raghunath Rao II, strengthened Maratha polity in Bundelkhand, however as he grew old, he handed over the reins of Jhansi to his younger brother Raja of Jhansi Shiv Rao Bhau. On the death of Raghunath Rao III son of Raja Shiv Rao Bhau in 1838, the British rulers accepted his brother Gangadhar Rao as the Raja of Jhansi in 1843.

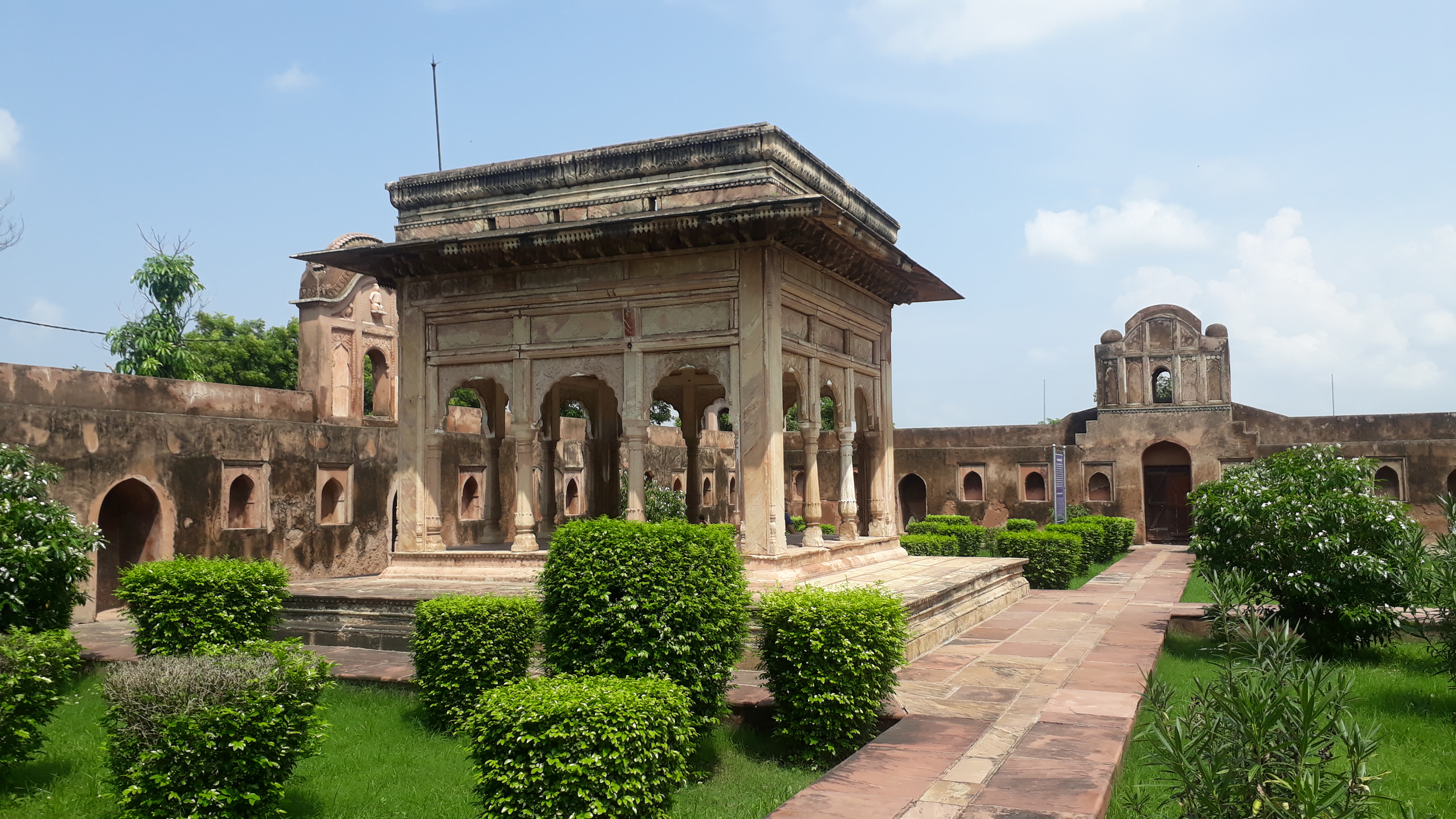
Cenotaph of Raja Gangadhar Rao or Gangadhar Rao ki Chhatri

He was an able administrator and he improved the financial condition of Jhansi, which had deteriorated during his predecessor's rule. He took corrective steps to ensure the growth and development of the town of Jhansi. He controlled an army of around 5,000 men. He possessed wisdom, diplomacy, and was a lover of art and culture; even the British were impressed by his statesmanlike qualities. Maharaj Gangadhar Rao possessed considerable taste and some scholarship; he collected a fine library of Sanskrit manuscripts and enriched the architecture of the town of Jhansi.

He was first married to Ramabai, who died soon after. She never became queen consort of Jhansi as Maharaj Gangadhar Rao started to hold the title of Raja (King) in 1843, after Maharani Ramabai's death. On 19 May 1842, Maharaja Gangadhar Rao married a young girl named Manikarnika Tambe, later renamed as Lakshmibai, who was directly given the title of Rani (Queen Consort) after marriage. She eventually became the Queen of Jhansi and revolted against the British during the Indian Rebellion of 1857.

Margashirsh Shukla Ekadashi, December 1851, she gave birth to a boy, named Damodar Rao, who died in March 1852. Later that year, Raja Gangadhar Rao adopted a child called Anand Rao, the son of his cousin Vasudev Newalkar of Parola, who was renamed Damodar Rao, on the day before he died. The adoption was in the presence of the British political officer who was given a letter from the Raja requesting that the child should be treated with kindness and that the government of Jhansi should be given to his widow for her lifetime. After the death of the Raja on 21 November 1853 because Damodar Rao was adopted, the British East India Company, under Governor-General Lord Dalhousie, applied the Doctrine of Lapse, rejecting Damodar Rao's claim to the throne and annexing the state to its territories.

== See also ==
- Maratha Empire
- Laxmibai, Queen of Jhansi
- History of India
- Jhansi

Gangadhar Rao Newalkar Dynasty
Regnal titles
Preceded by Raghunath Rao III	Maharaja of Jhansi; 1838-1853	Succeeded by Abolished taken over by British
