= Jhansi Ki Rani (disambiguation) =

Jhansi Ki Rani (1828–1858), or Rani of Jhansi, born Lakshmibai Newalkar, was the queen of the princely state of Jhansi in North India.

Jhansi Ki Rani, or variants, may also refer to:

== Arts and entertainment ==
- Jhansi Ki Rani (1953 film), an Indian Hindi-language historical drama film by Sohrab Modi about the queen
- Jhansi Rani (1988 film), an Indian Telugu-language thriller film
- Ek Veer Stree Ki Kahaani – Jhansi Ki Rani, a 2009 Indian Indian historical drama TV series about the queen
- "Jhansi Ki Rani" (poem), a poem about the queen by Subhadra Kumari Chauhan
  - Khoob Ladi Mardaani – Jhansi Ki Rani, a 2019 Indian historical drama TV series, based on the poem

== Other uses ==
- Jhansi Rani Square metro station, in Nagpur, India
- Rani Jhansi Marine National Park, Andaman and Nicobar Islands, India
- Virangana Lakshmibai Jhansi Junction Railway Station, Jhansi, Uttar Pradesh, India

== See also ==
- Manikarnika (disambiguation), another name of the queen
- Lakshmibai College (disambiguation)
- Lakshmibai, an Indian female given name
- Rani Lakshmi Bayi of Travancore or Bharani Thirunal Lakshmi Bayi, the queen of Travancore, India
- Laxmi Nagar (disambiguation)
- Rani of Jhansi Regiment, the women's regiment of the Indian National Army
