= Lakshmibai =

Lakshmibai or Laxmibai is a name. It can be both a feminine given name and a surname. Notable people with this name include: It is related to the name of the Hindu goddess Lakshmi.

== Given name ==
- Lakshmibai Newalkar (1828–1858), consort of the Maharaja of Jhansi, a princely state in what is today Uttar Pradesh, India
- V. Lakshmibai (c. 1945 – 2023), Indian mathematician
- Lakshmibai Tilak (1868–1936), Indian writer
- Lakshmibai Rajwade (1887–1984), Indian doctor
- Laxmibai Kelkar (1905–1978), Indian social reformer

== Surname ==
- Adruti Laxmibai (1899–unknown), Indian activist and politician

== See also ==
- Lakshmibai College (disambiguation)
- Laxmibai Nagar, residential area in New Delhi, India
- Laxmibai Nagar railway station, in Indore, Madhya Pradesh, India
