= Manikarnika =

Manikarnika may refer to:

- Manikarnika Tambe, known as the Rani of Jhansi, Indian queen of Jhansi
- Manikarnika: The Queen of Jhansi, a 2019 Indian Hindi-language film

== See also ==
- Jhansi Ki Rani (disambiguation)
- Manikarnika Ghat, a cremation ground along the river Ganga in Varanasi, Uttar Pradesh, India
- Manikarnika Tank, a ceremonial water reservoir in Odisha, India
- Secunderabad–Danapur Express, a train formerly known as Manikarnika Express
