= Gulam Ghaus Khan =

Indian Independence activist

Gulam Ghaus Khan (died 3 April 1858) also known as Topchi Ghulam Ghaus Khan was an Indian Independence activist who was a close confidant of Rani Lakhsmi Bai, the queen of Jhansi. He was the Main Gunner in the army of Rani Lakhsmi Bai. He had been an active participant in the 1857 Revolt against the British East India Company. He was a devout Muslim and a follower of Abdul Qadir Jilani, often known as Gausul Aazam by his followers. He belonged to a Pathan family.

== Legacy ==
Gulam Ghaus Khan Park in Jhansi, Uttar Pradesh is named after him.

In October 2024, Rani Lakhsmi Bai Samiti announced the installation of a statue of Khan at a park near Eidgah in New Delhi with the help of the Municipal Corporation.
