= Subhadra Kumari Chauhan =

Indian poet (1904-1948)

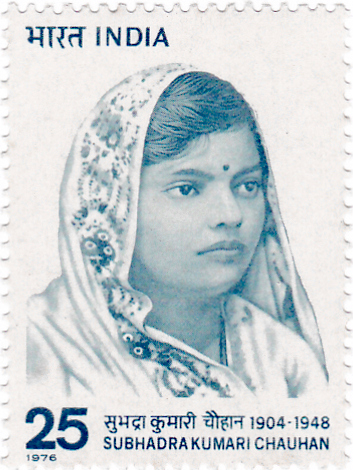
- Subhadra Kumari Chauhan
- Born: 16 August 1904; Allahabad, United Provinces of Agra and Oudh, British India (present day Prayagraj, Uttar Pradesh, India)
- Died: 15 February 1948 (aged 43); Seoni, Central Provinces and Berar, Dominion of India (present day Seoni, Madhya Pradesh, India)
- Occupation: Poet
- Spouse: Thakur Lakshman Singh Chauhan
- Children: 5
- Writing career
- Language: Hindi
- Period: 1904–1948
- Genre: Poetry
- Subject: Hindi literature

Subhadra Kumari Chauhan (16 August 1904 – 15 February 1948) was an Indian poet. One of her most popular poems is Jhansi Ki Rani (about the courageous Queen of Jhansi).

== Biography ==
Subhadra Chauhan was born into a Rajput family in Nihalpur village, Prayagraj, Uttar Pradesh. She initially studied in the Crosthwaite Girls' School in Prayagraj where she was senior to and friends with Mahadevi Verma and passed the middle-school examination in 1919. She married Thakur Lakshman Singh Chauhan of Khandwa in 1919 when she was sixteen with whom she had five children. After her marriage with Thakur Lakshman Singh Chauhan of Khandwa in the same year, she moved to Jubbulpore (now Jabalpur), Central Provinces.

In 1921, Subhadra Kumari Chauhan and her husband joined Mahatma Gandhi's Non-Cooperation Movement. She was the first woman Satyagrahi to court arrest in Nagpur and was jailed twice for her involvement in protests against the British rule in 1923 and 1942.

She was a member of the legislative assembly of the state (erstwhile Central Provinces). She died in 1948 in a car accident near Seoni, Madhya Pradesh, on her way back to Jabalpur from Nagpur, the then capital of Central Provinces, where she had gone to attend the assembly session.

=== Writing career ===
Chauhan authored a number of popular works in Hindi poetry. Her most famous composition is Jhansi Ki Rani, an emotionally charged poem describing the life of Rani Lakshmi Bai. The poem is one of the most recited and sung poems in Hindi literature. An emotionally charged description of the life of the queen of Jhansi(British India) and her participation in the 1857 revolution, it is often taught in schools in India. A couplet repeated at the end of each stanza reads thus:

बुंदेले हरबोलों के मुँह हमने सुनी कहानी थी,
खूब लड़ी मर्दानी वह तो झाँसी वाली रानी थी॥

This and her other poems, Jallianwala Bagh mein Vasant, Veeron Ka Kaisa Ho Basant, Rakhi Ki Chunauti, and Vida, openly talk about the freedom movement. They are said to have inspired great numbers of Indian youth to participate in the Indian Freedom Movement. Here is the opening stanza of Jhansi ki Rani:

झाँसी की रानी

सिंहासन हिल उठे राजवंशों ने भृकुटी तानी थी,
बूढ़े भारत में भी आई फिर से नयी जवानी थी,
गुमी हुई आज़ादी की कीमत सबने पहचानी थी,
दूर फिरंगी को करने की सबने मन में ठानी थी।
चमक उठी सन सत्तावन में, वह तलवार पुरानी थी,
बुंदेले हरबोलों के मुँह हमने सुनी कहानी थी,
खूब लड़ी मर्दानी वह तो झाँसी वाली रानी थी॥

— Opening stanza of Jhansi ki Rani in Hindi

sinhasan hil uthe, rajavanshon ne bhrikuti tani thi,
boodhhe bharat mein bhi aayi, phir se nayi jawaani thi,
gumi hui azadI ki keemat sab ne pahachani thi,
door firangi ko karne ki sab ne mann mein thani thi.
chamak uthi san sattawan mein, woh talwaar puraani thi,
bundele harbolon ke munh ham ne sunI kahani thi,
khoob ladi mardani woh to jhansI wali rani thi.

— Roman transliteration using ITRANS

The thrones shook and royalties scowled
Old India was re-invigorated with new youth
People realised the value of lost freedom
Everybody was determined to throw the foreigners out
The old sword glistened again in 1857
This story we heard from the mouths of Bundel bards
Like a man she fought, she was the Queen of Jhansi

— English translation

Subhadra Kumari Chauhan wrote in the Khariboli dialect of Hindi, in a simple, clear style. Apart from heroic poems, she also wrote poems for children. She wrote some short stories based on the life of the middle class.

== Legacy ==
The ICGS Subhadra Kumari Chauhan, an Indian Coast Guard ship, was named for the poet. The government of Madhya Pradesh placed a statue of Subhadra Kumari Chauhan before the Municipal Corporation office of Jabalpur.

On 6 August 1976, India Posts released a postage stamp to commemorate her.

On 16 August 2021, Google commemorated Subhadra Kumari with a Doodle on her 117th birth anniversary. Google commented: "Chauhan’s poetry remains a staple in many Indian classrooms as a symbol of historical progress, encouraging future generations to stand up against social injustice and celebrate the words that shaped a nation’s history".

== Works ==
=== Collections of poems ===
- Khilonewala
- Tridhara
- Mukul (1930)
- Yeh Kadamb Ka Ped

These anthologies consist some of the well-known poems like "Jhansi ki Raani", "Veeron Ka Kaisa Ho Basant" and "Yeh Kadamb Ka Ped".

- "Seedhe-Saade Chitra" (1946)
- "Mera naya Bachpan" (1946)
- "Bikhare Moti" (1932)
- "Jhansi ki Rani"

=== Short stories ===
- Hingvala (or Hingwala)
