= Laxmi Nagar =

Laxmi Nagar or Lakshmi Nagar (lit. 'City of Laxmi') may refer to the following places:

== India ==
- Laxmi Nagar (Delhi)
  - Laxmi Nagar Assembly constituency
  - Laxmi Nagar metro station
- Lakshmi Nagar, Erode, Tamil Nadu
- Laxmi Nagar, Great Nicobar, Andaman and Nicobar Islands
- Laxmi Nagar (Pune) metro station, Maharashtra
- Laxmi Nagar (Jaipur) metro station, Jaipur
- Laxmi Nagar (Ghatkopar) metro station, Mumbai
- Laxminagar Colony, Mehdipatnam, Hyderabad

== Nepal ==
- Lakshminagar, Doti, Nepal

== See also ==
- Lakshmi (disambiguation)
- Nagar (disambiguation)
- Jhansi Ki Rani (disambiguation)
- Laxmibai Nagar, neighborhood of Delhi, India
- Laxmibai Nagar railway station, Madhya Pradesh, India
