= Vrindavan Lal Verma =

Hindi novelist and playwright (1889 – 1969)

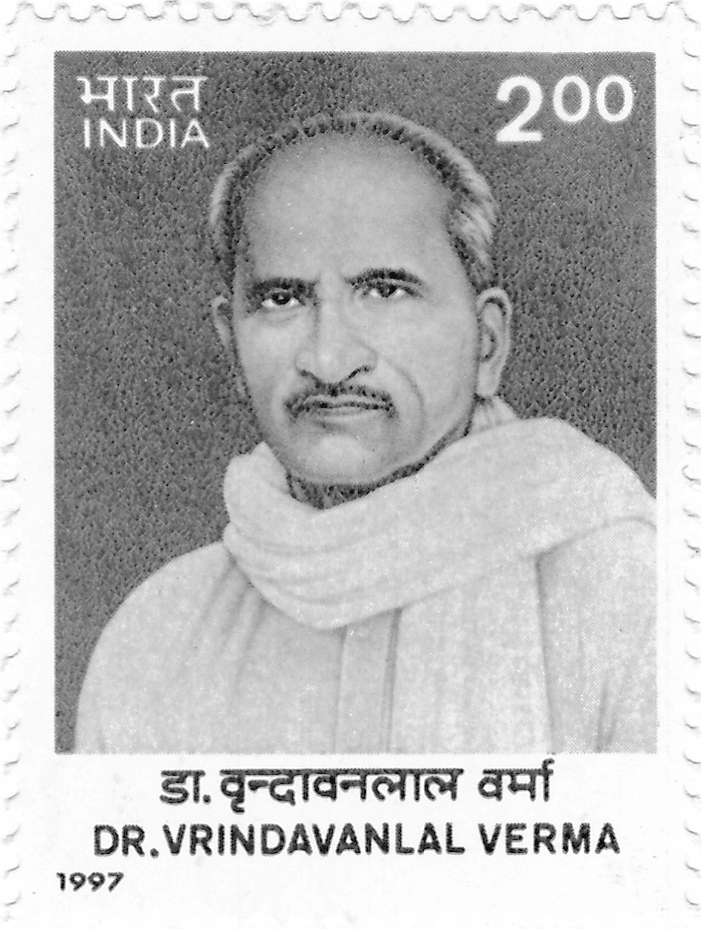

Personal details
- Born: 9 January 1889 Mauranipur, Jhansi District, India
- Died: 23 February 1969 (aged 80)

Vrindavan Lal verma (9 January 1889 – 23 February 1969) was a Hindi novelist and playwright. He was honoured with Padma Bhushan for his literary works; Agra University presented him with honorary D. Lit. He received Soviet Land Nehru Award and the government India also awarded him for his novel, Jhansi Ki Rani.

== Life and career ==
He was drawn toward mythological and historical narratives from early childhood. His masterpiece, Mriganayani, set at the end of the 15th century in Gwalior, tells the legend of Man Singh Tomar and his "doe-eyed queen" Mrignayani.

His historical novels are

- Gadh Kundar (1927)
- Virata ki Padmini (1930)
- Musahibju (1943)
- Jhansi ki Rani (1946)
- Kachnar (1947)
- Madavji Sindhia (1949)
- Tute Kante (1949)
- Mriganayani (1950)
- Bhuvan Vikram (1954)
- Ahilya Bai (1955)
- Rani Durgavati
- Lalitaditya

Varma's social novels include

- Sangam (1928)
- Lagan (1929)
- Pratyagat (1929)
- Kundali Chakra (1932)
- Prem ki Bheni (1939)
- Kabhi na Kabhi (1945)
- Achal Mera Koyi (1947)
- Rakhi ki Laj (1947)
- Sona (1947)
- Amar Bel (1952).

His plays include an adaptation of his novel, Jhansi ki Rani, Hans Mayur (1950), Bans ki Phans (1950), Pile Hath (1950), Purva ki Aur (1951), Kevat (1951), Nilkanth (1951), Mangal Sutra (1952), Birbal (1953), and Lalit Vikram (1953).

Varma wrote short stories also which have been published in seven volumes. His autobiography Apni Kahani has also been applauded.
