= Adruti Laxmibai =

Indian freedom movement activist and politician

Member of Legislative Assembly
- In office 1937–1952

Deputy speaker of Odisha Legislative Assembly
- In office 29 May 1946 – 20 February 1952

Personal details
- Born: 12 October 1899 Berhampur, Ganjam District, Madras Presidency, British India (now in Odisha, India)
- Party: Indian National Congress
- Relatives: V. V. Giri (brother)
- Education: Medicine at Christian Medical College, Vellore

Adruti Laxmibai (born 12 October 1899 – date of death unknown) was an Indian freedom movement activist and politician. She received her bachelor's degree from Dayacician College in Calcutta and later enrolled to study medicine at the Christian Medical College in Vellore. She was elected for the Berhampur constituency in 1937 and 1946 and was the deputy speaker of the Odisha Legislative Assembly, formerly known as Orissa, in 1946. She notably introduced a policy of free education for girls in Odisha.

== Early life, education and married life ==
Laxmibai was born on 12 October 1899 in Berhampur, in a Telugu Niyogi Brahmin family to Varahagiri Venkata Jogayya Pantulu (father) and Varahagiri Subhadramma (mother). She was the younger sister of the future Indian president V. V. Giri. Laxmibai completed her secondary education in Berhampur and later joined the Theosophical Society in Kashi. She was a graduate of Dayacician College in Calcutta and went on to study medicine at Christian Medical College in Vellore. Ill health prevented her from completing her medical studies and she eventually returned to Berhampur. After her return, she was married to Adruti Venkateswar Rao of Rajahmundry. Her husband died within one year of their marriage and she returned to her parents' house in Berhampur.

== Participation in Indian freedom movement ==
After her husband's death, Laxmibai was inspired by Mahatma Gandhi and participated in the Indian freedom movement, in which many of her family members were already involved. National leaders like Gandhi, Jawaharlal Nehru and Rajendra Prasad stayed at Giri's residence during their visits to the Berhampur district. She participated in activities such as boycotting foreign goods and picketing liquor shops. Her participation in these activities led to her first arrest on 18 January 1932. The Chhatrapur Court sentenced her to one year's imprisonment and a fine of 700 Indian rupees. She was later transferred to Vellore Central Prison and served one and a half years in prison. In 1935, she served as the President of the Ryots Mahasabha in Kulada, Ganjam. She was a prominent activist in the khadi movement and distributed khadi free of charge to the poor. She was also an active participant in the Quit India Movement of 1942. When India achieved independence, she was serving a sentence at a jail in Cuttack, where many notable freedom fighters were imprisoned during the swaraj movement. A memorial to freedom fighters was inaugurated at the jail site by Honorable Chief Minister of Odisha Naveen Patnaik on 23 January 2010, but the development appears to have stalled.

== Later involvement in politics ==
Laxmibai served as an active member of the Indian National Congress in Odisha from 1930 to 1940. She took on the roles of vice-president of the Ganjam district, the Congress Committee, and president of the Berhampur town Congress. Laxmibai was elected to the Odisha Assembly without any opposition from the Brahmapur Assembly Constituency in the first general elections of 1937, and continued as MLA until 1953. From 29 May 1946 to 20 February 1952, she held the positions of deputy speaker and speaker of the Odisha Legislative Assembly.

=== Women's empowerment ===
Laxmibai critically appraised the education policy presented at the deputy speaker's national conference in Kerala. She introduced a free education policy for girls in Odisha as part of her interest in empowering women. The policy improved the performance of girl students in the area. In Odisha, she was the president of the Kasturba Memorial Fund's local branch as an adviser for the Government Girls High School Committee and a member of the State Social Welfare Board. She also visited Ganjam district, Boudh district and Phulbani district to help poor students and she gave aid to girl students in the Jaya Mangalam Ashram.
