= Jhansi Ki Rani (poem) =

Poem by Subhadra Kumari Chauhan

Rani of Jhansi
- by Subhadra Kumari Chauhan
- Original title: Jhansi ki Rani
- Country: India
- Language: Hindi
- Subject: Rani of Jhansi

"Jhansi ki Rani" (Devanagari: झाँसी की रानी; transl. The Queen of Jhansi) is a poem by Hindi poet Subhadra Kumari Chauhan. The poem narrates the tale of Rani Lakshmibai and her fight against the British forces in the 1857 Indian Rebellion. The heroic poetry depicting Lakshmibai became a source of inspiration during later independence movement, was recited on stage, during morning processions and is now part of multiple Indian education curricula.

Jhansi ki Rani is a poem based on Veer Ras and was written during the period when Chhayavad was a prominent feature in Hindi literature The poem is written with the then Bundeli folk songs as its base, and is seen as a strong expression of Indian nationalism within the Hindi literature. It is interpreted as a tribute by the poet to Rani Laxmibai of Jhansi.

== Lyrics ==
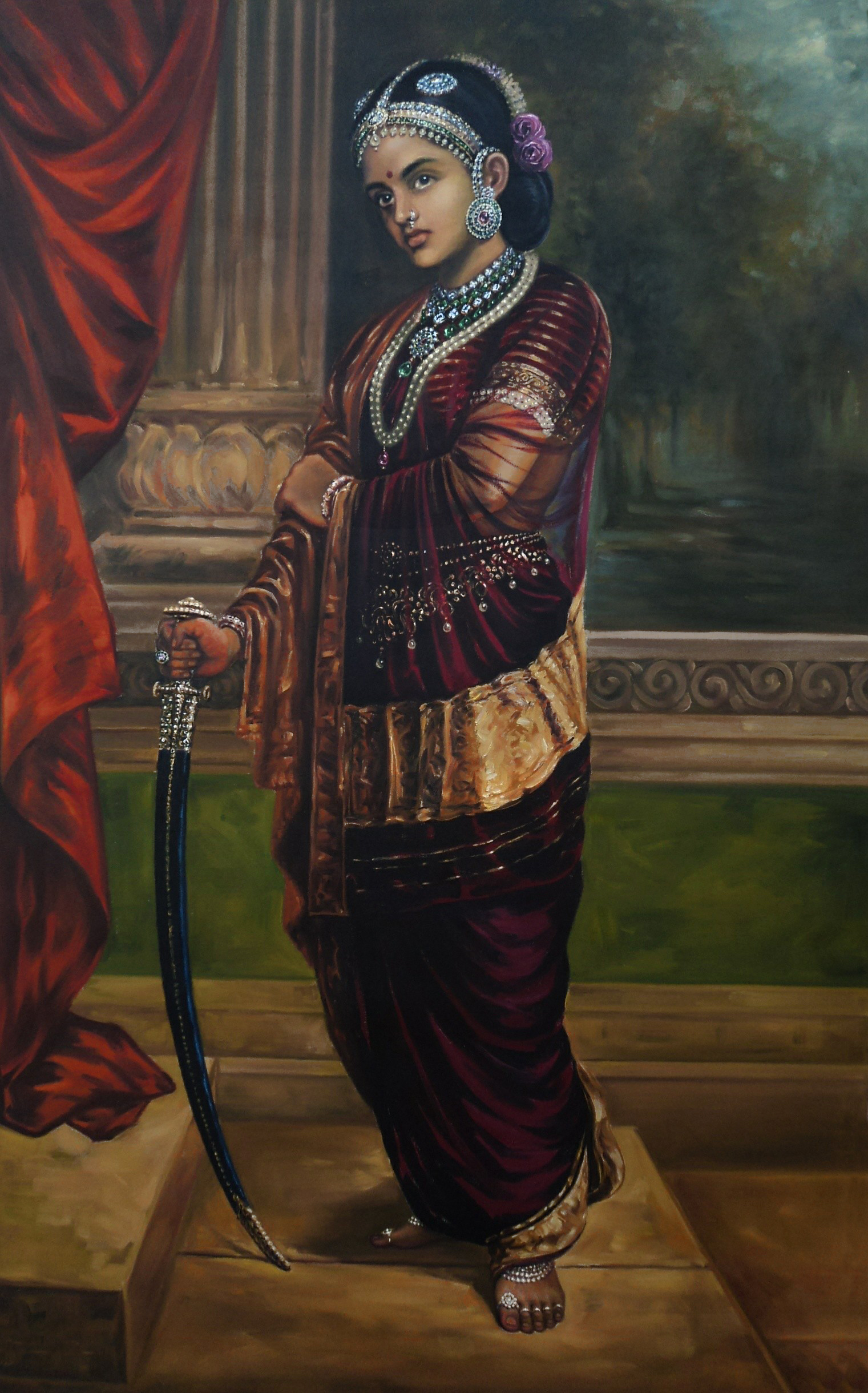
Rani Lakshmibai, the Jhansi Ki Rani described in the poem

The first verse of Jhansi Ki Rani read as follows:

Devanagari script

सिंहासन हिल उठे राजवंशों ने भृकुटी तानी थी,
बूढ़े भारत में भी आई फिर से नयी जवानी थी,
गुमी हुई आज़ादी की कीमत सबने पहचानी थी,
दूर फिरंगी को करने की सबने मन में ठानी थी।

चमक उठी सन सत्तावन में, वह तलवार पुरानी थी,
बुंदेले हरबोलों के मुँह हमने सुनी कहानी थी,
खूब लड़ी मर्दानी वह तो झाँसी वाली रानी थी॥

Latin transliteration

siṅhāsan hil uṭhe rājavaṅshoṅ ne bhṛkuṭī tānī thī,
būḍhe bhārat meṅ bhī āī phir se nayī javānī thī,
gumī huī ājādī kī kīmat sabane pahachānī thī,
dūr firaṅgī ko karane kī sabane man meṅ ṭhānī thī.

chamak uṭhī san sattāvan meṅ, vah talavār purānī thī,
buṅdele haraboloṅ ke muňh hamane sunī kahānī thī,
khūb laḍī mardānī vah to jhāňsī vālī rānī thī॥

IPA transcription

sɪnhaːsən hɪl ʊThɛ raːjəvənshon nɛ bhRikʊTiː taːniː thiː,
buːDhɛ bhaːrət mɛn bhiː aːiː fɪr sɛ nəyiː jəvaːniː thiː,
gʊmiː hʊiː aːjaːdiː kiː kiːmət səbənɛ pəhəchaːniː thiː,
duːr fɪrəngiː ko kərənɛ kiː səbənɛ mən mɛn Thaːniː thiː.

chəmək ʊThiː sən səttaːvən mɛn, vəh tələvaːr pʊraːniː thiː,
bʊndɛlɛ hərəbolon kɛ mʊnh həmənɛ sʊniː kəhaːniː thiː,
khuːb ləDiː mərdaːniː vəh to jhaːnsiː vaːliː raːniː thiː॥

== Introduction ==
With an emotionally charged description of the life of the queen of Jhansi (British India) and her participation in the 1857 revolution, Jhansi Ki Rani is often taught in schools in India. A couplet repeated at the end of each stanza reads thus:

बुंदेले हरबोलों के मुँह हमने सुनी कहानी थी,
खूब लड़ी मर्दानी वह तो झाँसी वाली रानी थी॥

Subhadra Kumari Chauhan wrote in the Khariboli dialect of Hindi, in a simple, clear style.

== Summary ==
Every stanza of the poem ends with Chauhan recalling that she heard the story of Rani Lakshmibai from the Bundelas and their folktales. Chauhan describes that Lakshmibai was born in a family of braves, and was so herself from her childhood and had heroes like Shivaji. She got married at a young age and came to Jhansi, but later was saddened by death of her childless husband. The poet contrasts this with Dalhousie, who was excited as it enabled him to siege Jhansi. Chauhan then proceeds to remember other great heroes who contributed in the struggle of freedom. She again contrasts and describes the condition of the contemporary royal families with that of Lakshmibai, and her friends Kana and Mandara who fought bravely and defeated Walker. She describes how they then later headed to Gwalior, but were betrayed by Scindias, which forced them to leave. Rani Lakshmibai then defeated Smith, however not long after, her horse died of injuries. However, she still managed to fight off Hugh Rose, and went ahead. Chauhan then proceeds to explain her death, saying that Lakshmibai was attacked from all the sides, which forced her horse to jump across a drain, but couldn't as the horse was new and unexperienced.
