= Manikarnika Tank =

- Location in Odisha Manikarnika Tank (India)

Religion
- Affiliation: Hinduism
- Deity: Kapileswara lingam

Location
- Location: Bhubaneswar
- State: Odisha
- Country: India
- Interactive map of Manikarnika Tank
- Coordinates: 20°14′14″N 85°50′05″E

Architecture
- Type: kalingan Kalinga Architecture
- Completed: 13th-14th century AD
- Elevation: 14 m (46 ft)

Manikarnika tank is located beyond the southern compound wall of the Kapilesvara temple precinct, in the outskirt of the village Kapilesvara, Old Town, Bhubaneswar. It is now under the care and maintenance of Kapilesvara Trust Board. The tank is enclosed within a masonry embankment made of both dressed sandstone and laterite blocks.

== Tradition & legends ==
According to the local legend goddess Parvati while engaged in her fight with the demons Kirtti and Basa lost her ear rings that were studded with gem (mani). After killing the demons Parvati told lord Siva about the earrings (mani-kundala) which she lost. Lord Siva with his trident struck upon the earth on the Kapila Kunda, from where the ear-rings were recovered. Parvati offered the ear-rings to Lord Kapilesvara. Hence another name of Kapilesvara is Kapila-muni and the kunda or tank where from the ear-rings were recovered was known as Manikarnesvara kunda or tank. Every day Lord Kapilesvara is given ritual bath with the waters of Manikarnika tank. Hence the tank is held in high esteem

== Physical description ==
=== Surrounding ===
The tank is surrounded by paddy fields in all sides except the northern side which is covered by the southern compound wall of the Kapilesvara temple. On the northern embankment there are a series of temples namely Pamesvara, Chakresvara, Bakresvara, Kardamesvara, Chitresvara and a Hanumana temple.

=== Orientation ===
Bathing Ghats are provided with steps in the northern embankment which has nine ghats and one each in western and southern embankments.

=== Special feature ===
It is fed by a natural spring from the underground. The excess and waste water is discharged through a channel in the south-eastern corner of the tank. Since it is fed by a narrow water level remains constant throughout the year. Here Lord Kapilesvara takes ceremonial bath on the day of Sankranti, solar eclipse and lunar eclipse. There is a temple named Ganga mata at the center of the tank. It is in pidha order with three receding tiers. It measures 1.85 square metres. There is a Parvati image inside the sanctum. The deity is seated in lalitasana pose over a bull and crowned with a kiritamukuta. The arms are broken.

== See also ==
- List of Hindu temples in India § Odisha
