= Jhansi Ki Rani Lakshmibai =

Historical novel by author Vrindavanlal Verma

Jhansi Ki Rani Lakshmibai is a historical novel by Hindi author Vrindavanlal Verma. It was first published in 1946. From 1946 to 1948, the author also wrote a play with the same title, which was staged in 1955. However, the novel gained greater fame and is considered a milestone in historical fiction in Hindi literature. A reprint of the novel was issued in 1951.

The novel is based on the life of Rani Lakshmibai, the queen of the Maratha-ruled Jhansi State during the British Raj in India. It also provides a modern interpretation of the Indian Rebellion of 1857.

== Reception ==
In the preface, Verma explains that the creation of the novel stemmed from his quest to determine whether Lakshmibai fought for swaraj (self-rule) or merely to preserve her own kingdom. He writes that the available written sources were insufficient, but his interviews and the stories he heard from people convinced him that she fought the British for swaraj. As a result, the novel has also been seen as a form of personal historical recollection.

The novel was published in 1949 and reprinted in 1951. Before this, Verma had published several short stories and a few novels, but this work established him as an important figure in Hindi literature.

One of the novel's key contributions was that Verma wrote it during a period when historical fiction was scarce in Hindi literature. His contributions not only enriched Hindi fiction in this genre, but later English scholars also declared these works as milestones.

Ganesh Shankar Vidyarthi once compared Verma's novel Garh Kundar to the works of English author Walter Scott. With later works like Jhansi Ki Rani and Mrignayani, Verma came to be known as the "Walter Scott of Hindi."

== Sources ==
- Vrindavanlal Verma (2001). Lakshmi Bai, the Rani of Jhansi. Ocean Books. ISBN 978-81-87100-54-6. Archived from the original on 24 April 2017.
- Sri Tilak (2013). Ganeshshankar Vidyarthi (Vol 1). Prabhat Prakashan. ISBN 978-93-5048-271-1. Archived from the original on 24 April 2017.
- Mohan Lal (1992). Encyclopaedia of Indian Literature: Sasay to Zorgot. Sahitya Akademi. ISBN 978-81-260-1221-3. Archived from the original on 24 April 2017.
- Shishir Kumar Das (1991). History of Indian Literature: 1911–1956, Struggle for Freedom: Triumph and Tragedy. Sahitya Akademi. ISBN 978-81-7201-798-9. Archived from the original on 24 April 2017.
- Satyendra Kush (1 January 2000). Dictionary of Hindu Literature. Sarup & Sons. ISBN 978-81-7625-159-4. Archived from the original on 24 April 2017.
- Bates, Crispin; Carter, Marina (2 January 2017). Mutiny at the Margins: New Perspectives on the Indian Uprising of 1857: Documents of the Indian Uprising. SAGE Publications. ISBN 978-93-85985-75-1.
- Harleen Singh (9 June 2014). The Rani of Jhansi: Gender, History, and Fable in India. Cambridge University Press. ISBN 978-1-107-04280-3. Archived from the original on 24 April 2017.
- K. M. George (1992). Modern Indian Literature, an Anthology: Surveys and Poems. Sahitya Akademi. ISBN 978-81-7201-324-0. Archived from the original on 24 April 2017.
- Joyce Lebra-Chapman (1986). The Rani of Jhansi: A Study in Female Heroism in India. University of Hawaii Press. ISBN 978-0-8248-0984-3. Archived from the original on 24 April 2017.
