= Lakshmibai College =

Lakshmibai College may refer to:

- Lakshmibai College, a college of the University of Delhi, India.
- Lakshmibai National Institute of Physical Education, formerly Lakshmibai College of Physical Education, in Madhya Pradesh, India
- Lakshmibai National College of Physical Education, in Thiruvananthapuram, Kerala, India
- Maharani Laxmi Bai Govt. College of Excellence, in Gwalior, Madhya Pradesh, India

== See also ==
- Jhansi Ki Rani (disambiguation)
- Rani Lakshmi Bai Central Agricultural University, Jhansi, Uttar Pradesh, India
- Maharani Laxmi Bai Medical College, Jhansi, Uttar Pradesh, India
- Maharani Laxmi Bai Govt. College of Excellence, Gwalior, Madhya Pradesh, India
