= Lakshmibai, Rani of Jhansi =

Prominent leader of the 1857 Indian rebellion

Lakshmibai
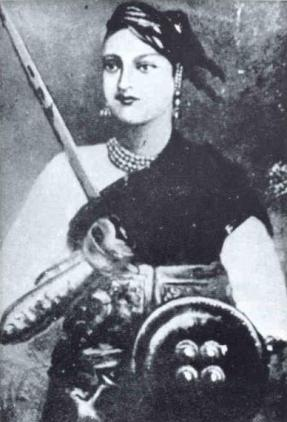
- A posthumous depiction of the Rani of Jhansi dressed for battle

Queen consort of Jhansi
- Reign: 19 March 1842 - 21 November 1853

Regent of Jhansi
- Reign: 21 November 1853 - 18 June 1858
- Born: Manikarnika Tambe; 1827–30, or 1835; Varanasi, British India
- Died: 18 June 1858; Gwalior, British India
- Spouse: Raja Gangadhar Rao (m. 1842; died 1853)
- Issue: Damodar Rao (adopted)
- Military career
- Allegiance: Jhansi State
- Conflicts: Indian Rebellion of 1857; Siege of Jhansi

Lakshmibai, Rani of Jhansi (Hindi: Jhānsi Ki Rāni; born Manikarnika Tambe; 1827–30, or 1835 – 18 June 1858) was one of the leading figures of the Indian Rebellion of 1857. The queen consort of the princely state of Jhansi from 1843 to 1853, she assumed its leadership after the outbreak of the conflict and fought several battles against the British. Her life and deeds are celebrated in modern India and she remains a potent symbol of Indian nationalism.

Born into a Marathi family in Varanasi, Manikarnika Tambe was married to the raja of Jhansi, Gangadhar Rao, at a young age, taking the name Rani Lakshmibai. The couple had one son but he died young, and so when Gangadhar Rao was on his deathbed in 1853, he adopted Damodar Rao, a young relative, to be his successor. The British East India Company, which by then had subjugated much of India, including Jhansi, refused to recognise this succession and annexed Jhansi under the Doctrine of Lapse, ignoring the Rani's vigorous protests to the Governor-General Lord Dalhousie.

In May 1857, the Indian troops stationed at Jhansi mutinied and massacred most of the British in the town; the Rani's complicity and participation in these events was and remains contested. She took over the rulership of Jhansi and recruited an army to see off incursions from neighbouring states. Although her relations with the British were initially neutral, they decided to treat her as an enemy: Major General Hugh Rose attacked and captured Jhansi in March and April 1858. The Rani escaped the siege on horseback and joined other rebel leaders at Kalpi, where Rose defeated them on 22 May. The rebels fled to Gwalior Fort, where they made their last stand; the Rani died there in battle.

After the rebellion, the Rani's name and actions became closely associated with nationalist movements in India. Her legend, influenced by Hindu mythology, became hugely influential because of its universal applicability. She was regarded as a great heroine by the Indian independence movement and remains revered in modern India, although Dalit communities tend to view her negatively. Rani Lakshmibai has been extensively depicted in artwork, cinema, and literature, most notably in the 1930 poem "Jhansi Ki Rani" and Vrindavan Lal Verma's 1946 novel Jhansi Ki Rani Lakshmibai.

== Biography ==
Little is known for certain about the Rani's life before 1857, because there was then no need to record details about an as-yet ordinary young girl. As a result, every biography of her life relies on a mixture of factual evidence and legendary tales, especially when concerning her childhood and adolescence.

=== Early life and marriage ===
Moropant Tambe was a Karhada Brahmin who served the Maratha noble Chimaji, whose brother Baji Rao II had been deposed as Maratha peshwa (ruler) in 1817. In the city of Varanasi, he and his wife Bhagirathi had a daughter, whom they named Manikarnika, an epithet of the River Ganges; (Note: Manikarnika's mother Bhagirathi was similarly named after an epithet of the Ganges.) in childhood she was known by the diminutive Manu. Her birth year is disputed: British sources tended towards the year 1827, whereas Indian sources generally preferred the year 1835. The historians Tapti Roy and Rudrangshu Mukherjee have argued that the latter account is implausible because of chronological irregularities; they place Manikarnika's birth between 1828 and 1830.

Manikarnika's mother Bhagirathi died when she was four, a year after the death of her father's employer Chimaji. Moropant moved to the court of Baji Rao at Bithur, who gave him a job and who became fond of Manikarnika. According to uncorroborated popular legend, her childhood playmates in Bithur included Nana Sahib and Tatya Tope, who would similarly become prominent in 1857. These stories say that Manikarnika, deprived of a feminine influence by her mother's death, was allowed to play and learn with her male playmates: she was literate, skilled in horseriding, and—extremely unusually for a girl, if true—was given lessons in fencing, swordplay, and even firearms.

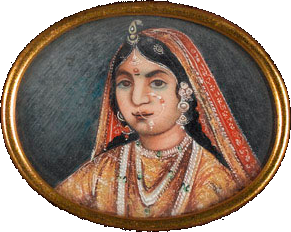
A miniature portrait of Rani Lakshmibai

It is presumed that Baji Rao brought Manikarnika to the attention of Gangadhar Rao, the old raja (king) of Jhansi who had no children and greatly desired an heir. The ambitious Moropant accepted the unexpectedly prestigious marriage offer, and the couple wed, according to Indian sources, in May 1842. If the traditional Indian chronology is correct, Manakarnika would have been seven years old, and the marriage would not have been consummated until she was fourteen. Accorded the name Lakshmi, after the Hindu goddess, she was thereafter known as the Rani Lakshmibai. Both Indian and British sources portray Gangadhar Rao as an apolitical figure uninterested in rulership—thus increasing the scope for depicting the Rani's leadership abilities—but while British sources characterise him as debauched and imbecilic, Indian sources interpret these traits as evidence of his cultured nature. According to popular legend, he turned a blind eye to Rani Lakshmibai's equipping and training of an armed all-female regiment, but if it existed, it was probably formed after Gangadhar Rao's death.

God willing I still hope to recover and regain my health. I am not too old, so I may still father children. In case that happens, I will take the proper measures concerning my adopted son. But if I fail to live, please take my previous loyalty into account and show kindness to my son. Please acknowledge my widow as the mother of this boy during her lifetime. May the government approve of her as the queen and ruler of this kingdom as long as the boy is still under age. Please take care that no injustice is done to her.

— Gangadhar Rao, Letter to East India Company officials, 19 November 1853

In 1851, Lakshmibai gave birth to a son amid much rejoicing, but he died at a few months old to the great grief of his parents. Gangadhar Rao's health deteriorated over the following two years. As was customary, he adopted a young boy on his deathbed—in this case, a five-year-old relative named Anand Rao, who was renamed Damodar Rao—before dying on 21 November 1853. Two days before his death, Gangadhar Rao wrote a letter to East India Company officials, pleading with them to recognise Damodar Rao as the new ruler and the Rani Lakshmibai as his regent.

=== Widowhood and annexation ===
By the mid-nineteenth century, the armies of the British East India Company, a merchant corporation-turned political entity, had subjugated much of the Indian subcontinent; Jhansi itself had been ceded to the Company in 1817. By 1853, the Company administration, led by Governor-General Lord Dalhousie, had for several years enforced a "doctrine of lapse", wherein Indian states whose Hindu rulers died without a natural heir were annexed by Britain. This policy was quickly enforced on Jhansi after Gangadhar Rao's death, to the Rani's dismay. She wrote a letter to the Company protesting against the annexation on 16 February 1854. Dalhousie issued a lengthy minute in response eleven days later. He characterised Gangadhar Rao's rule as one of decline and mismanagement, asserted that Jhansi and its people would benefit from direct British rule, and argued that since the British had conquered the Marathas, Jhansi's former overlords, the Company was now the "paramount power" with the authority to decide the succession.

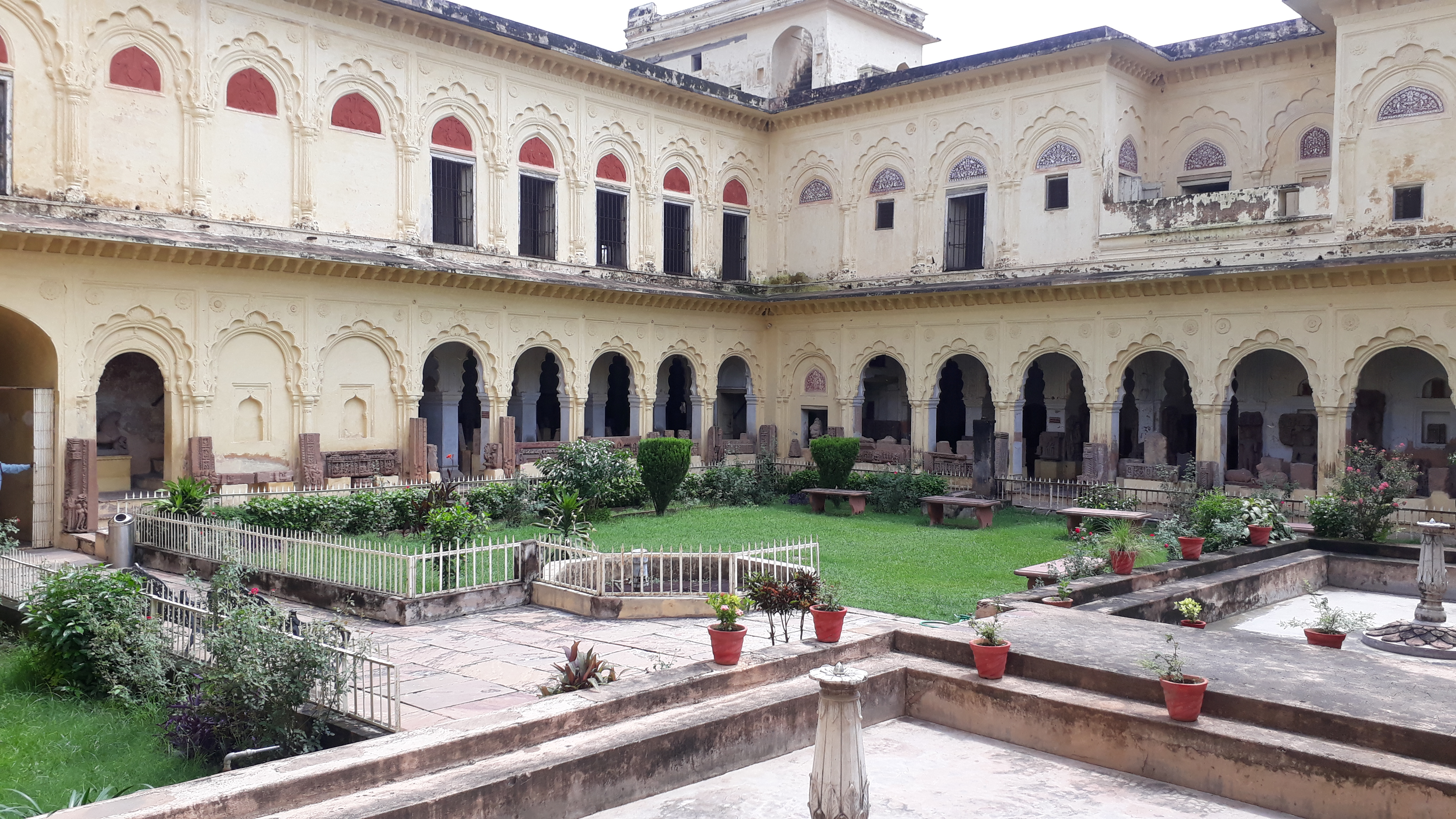
The Rani Mahal, home of the Rani 1853–1858

Lakshmibai fought the decision through diplomatic channels. She initiated conversations with Major Ellis, a sympathetic local Company official, and engaged John Lang, an Australian lawyer, to represent her. She wrote multiple appeals to Dalhousie, outlining previous British treaties with Jhansi in 1803, 1817, and 1842 which recognised the rajas of Jhansi as legitimate rulers. She also cited specific terminology and Hindu shastra tradition to argue that Damodar Rao should be entitled to the throne. Dalhousie bluntly rejected these appeals without refuting the arguments contained within, but still the Rani persisted: her final appeals concluded that the annexation constituted a "gross violation ... of treaties" and that Jhansi was reduced to "subjection, dishonour, and poverty". (Note: Mukherjee notes that of a long line of Indian rulers whose sovereignty had been usurped by the British since Mir Qasim in 1763, the Rani was "probably the first" to present arguments directly to the Company.)

None of these appeals came to fruition, and Jhansi lapsed to the Company in May 1854. Granted a lifetime pension of five thousand rupees per month (or £6,000 yearly) by the new Company superintendent of Jhansi, Captain Alexander Skene, Lakshmibai was required to vacate the fort but allowed to keep the two-storey palace; she was also granted immunity to British courts. The Company however deemed her liable for 36,000 rupees of debt Gangadhar Rao had incurred. Through her lawyer, the Rani argued that these debts were the responsibility of the state and thus had been assumed by the British during the annexation. The issue was never resolved. Other disagreements included the 1854 lifting of the ban on cattle slaughter in Jhansi, the British occupation of a temple outside the town, and of course the continued foreign rule.

Later songs and poems retell Lakshmibai's defiant mantra, "I will never give up my Jhansi!", which she is traditionally said to have cried during this period. She continued to train her all-female regiment, if it existed, and paraded them on horseback through the town. Roy has argued that her quiet displays of religious virtue, in scrupulously visiting her temple twice-weekly and devoutly respecting tradition, allowed her more unconventional habits to become generally accepted even by conservative Hindu priests. She may have proposed that she return to Varanasi; the Company, worrying that the negative economic and social effects on Jhansi would be too great, declined.

=== Outbreak of rebellion ===
Important settlements around modern Uttar Pradesh during the Indian Rebellion

On 10 May 1857, native sepoy troops stationed in Meerut mutinied against their British officers, sparking the Indian Rebellion. The nascent rebellion swiftly grew as towns and troops across northern India, including Delhi, joined in. Nana Sahib organised massacres of the British at Kanpur, while similar events occurred in Lucknow; news of these killings had not reached Jhansi by the end of May. The garrison, commanded by Skene, consisted of native troops of the 12th Native Infantry and the 14th Irregular Cavalry, and oversaw a strategic position at the junction of four major roads: northwest to Agra and Delhi, northeast to Kanpur and Lucknow, east to Allahabad, and south across the Deccan Plateau.

Skene was not initially alarmed, and allowed the Rani to raise a bodyguard for her own protection. However, on 5 June, a company of infantry took control of the ammunition store, and shot their British commanding officer when he attempted to reassert control the next day. The remaining sixty British men, women, and children took refuge in the main fort, where they were besieged. According to a servant of a British captain, the Rani sent a letter claiming that the sepoys, accusing her of protecting the British, had surrounded her palace and demanded she provide assistance. The sepoys subsequently threatened to set fire to her palace and even to kill her if she refused to support them; she provided a thousand men and two previously-buried heavy guns. Her position was severely compromised because many of her own guards had joined the rebels.

On 8 June, the British surrendered and asked for safe passage; after an unknown person acquiesced, they were led to the Jokhan Bagh garden, where nearly all of them were killed. (Note: An Anglo-Indian woman named Mrs Mutlow was the only adult survivor of the massacre: she and at least one son—sources disagree on whether she had given birth to another—managed to escape through their resemblance to native Indians. Her husband was killed. Two others had previously escaped the fort before the massacre.) The Rani's involvement in this massacre is a subject of debate. S. Thornton, a tax collector in Samthar State, wrote that the Rani had instigated the revolt, while two somewhat questionable eyewitness accounts reported that she executed three British messengers and gave the rest false promise of safe passage. Other contemporary reports claimed the Rani was innocent, while the official report by F.W. Pinkney came to no clear conclusion.

Lakshmibai herself claimed, in two mid-June letters to Major Erskine, commissioner of the Saugor division, that she had been at the mercy of the mutineers and could not help the besieged British. She wished damnation upon the mutineers, asserted that she was governing only while Company rule was absent, and asked for government assistance to combat prevalent disorder. Erskine believed her account, but his superiors in Fort William were less trusting. Even if the Rani was not involved with the mutiny, its outcome had spectacularly coincided with her prior aims, and items belonging to the massacred were later found in her palace. Roy has also drawn attention to the active participation of her father Moropant Tambe in the events, drawing suspicion to the knowledge and complicity of his daughter.

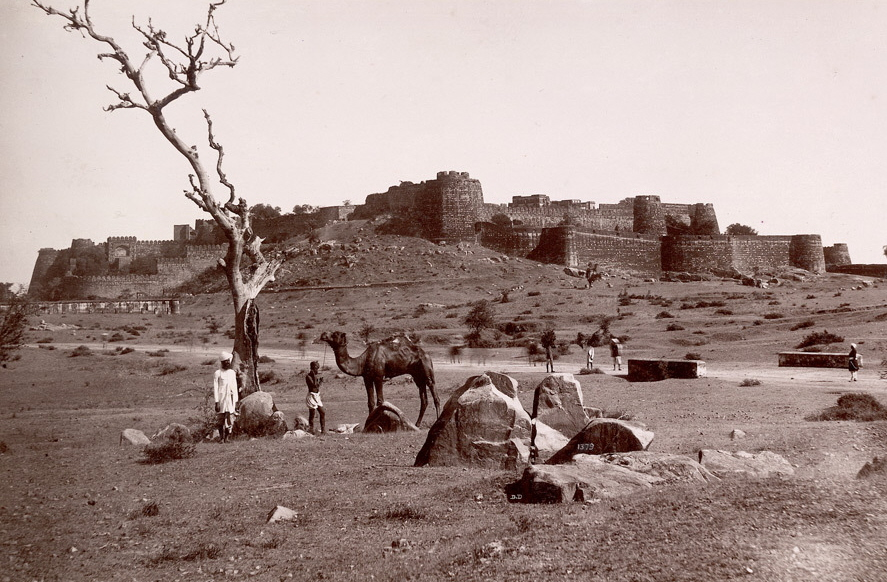
An 1882 photograph of Jhansi Fort

For a short period, the rebels were in control of Jhansi. Threatening to offer Jhansi to Sadasheo Rao, a cousin of Gangadhar Rao, they demanded 125,000 rupees from the Rani as a ransom for her position, but she negotiated the price down to 15,000 rupees. They took the money and left for Delhi on the evening of 11 June. Shortly after their departure, the Rani officially proclaimed that she had assumed rulership of Jhansi. (Note: The full proclamation read "Khalq khoda ki, mulk badshah ki, raj Lakshmi Bai ki" (English: The people are God's, the country is the Emperor's and the rule is Lakshmi Bai's).)

Through correspondence, Erskine authorised the Rani to rule until the British returned. In this capacity, she collected taxes, repaired the fort, and distributed donations to the poor. Jawahar Singh, one of her generals, defeated Sadasheo Rao, who twice tried to claim Jhansi for himself. Jhansi also saw off the nearby kingdoms of Orchha and Datia, whose leaders judged that the British would turn a blind eye if they divided Jhansi between them. Invading on 10 August, they besieged Jhansi from early September to late October, when they were driven off by the raja of Banpur's troops. These battles led the Rani to focus on re-establishing military authority, and so she ordered the recruitment of troops and the manufacturing of cannon and other weapons.

=== British hostility and Siege of Jhansi ===
In September 1857, with Jhansi under Orchha siege, the Rani requested that Major Erskine send forces to help, as he had earlier promised when authorising her rule. On 19 October, he replied in the negative, and further added that the conduct of all at Jhansi would be investigated. Even though she feared the British regarded her as an enemy, the Rani was not yet ready to take the rebels' side, although she was dismayed by the British failures to reply. Unable to persuade the Rani to commit to the rebellion, the raja of Banpur left Jhansi in January 1858. Some of her advisors advocated for peace with the British; others, including her father, for war. Remaining rebel leaders had begun to gather at Jhansi, including the raja of Banpur, who returned with 3,500 men on 15 March. This encouraged the Rani, who was still in two minds: she continued to send unanswered conciliations to the British, while at the same time militantly preparing arms and ammunition. The Rani was still attempting to negotiate with the British in mid-March, only a few days before they attacked Jhansi; the assault was reported to cause her great distress. Her position may have eventually been decided by her troops, who demanded to fight.

Because of her conflict with the Company-loyal state of Orchha and her rescue by the rebel raja of Banpur, the British had probably decided that the Rani was an enemy. Kanpur had been retaken on 16 July, followed by Lucknow and, on 22 September, Delhi. Their attention now fell on the remaining pockets of resistance in Central India: Jhansi, a pivotal strategic location, was a prime target. As the rebel strongholds were sequentially defeated, the participants fled to places which remained outside the British sphere of influence, such as Jhansi. Their numbers and unruliness would have compelled the Rani to accept their presence, which the British likely interpreted as her intentionally amassing a large rebel force. Her position was further eroded by religious anti-British pamphlets circulated around Bundelkhand which were incorrectly attributed to her and then passed on to British intelligence.

Command of the Central India Field Force of 4,300 men was given to the capable Major General Hugh Rose, who set out from Indore on 6 January 1858. His counter-insurgency force relieved Sagar on 3 February, defeated the army of Shahgarh and sacked Banpur in early March, and then marched on Jhansi. Rose's army, by now numbering around 3,000 men, approached Jhansi from several directions. Reconnaissance found that not only were the defences in excellent condition, with 25-foot (7.6 m) loopholed granite walls topped by large guns and batteries able to enfilade each other, but the surrounding countryside had been removed of all cover and foliage. The inhabitants of the town, including 11,500 soldiers, had stockpiled hundreds of tons of supplies in preparation for the upcoming siege. It began on 22 March with consistent artillery fire against Jhansi's ramparts. Although the Rani's forces returned fire capably, her best gunners were soon killed, and the defender's situation became increasingly dire. A breach was made on 29 March, although it was quickly stockaded. Rose was making preparations for an assault when news reached him that the Rani's childhood friend Tatya Tope was marching to rescue Jhansi with more than 20,000 men.

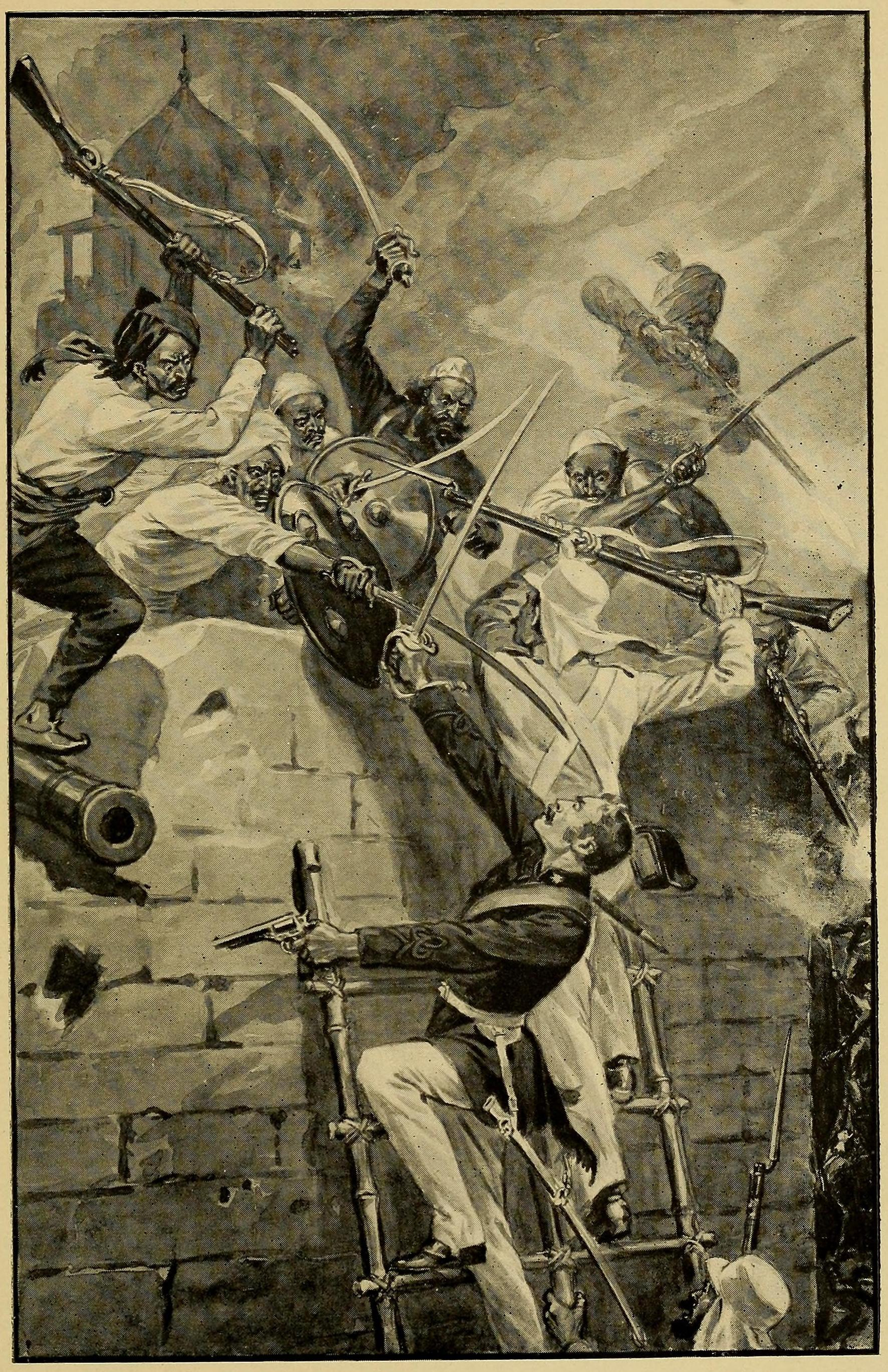
A 1914 depiction of Lieutenant Bonus, the first British soldier over the walls of Jhansi to survive. Two lieutenants who preceded him, surnamed Dick and Maiklejohn, were both killed.

Rose, unable to confront the new enemy with his whole force for fear that the defenders of Jhansi would sortie into his rear, detached just 1,200 men to confront Tatya Tope. Despite the numerical advantages of the rebel force, the vast majority of them was untrained, and they used old, slow guns. In the Battle of Betwa on 1 April, accurate British artillery fire repelled the first rebel line, and organisational mistakes meant the second line was unable to assist. In a comprehensive victory, the British lost less than one hundred men, and inflicted over 1,500 casualties on Tatya Tope's army. At 3am on 3 April, two columns assaulted the south wall of Jhansi—one through the breach and one using ladders in an escalade—and both penetrated the defences. The Rani personally led a counter-attack with 1,500 Afghan troops, but steady British reinforcement drove them back, and she retreated to the fort.

Rose's forces controlled the whole town, excluding the north-east quarter and fort, by sunset. The defenders fought stubbornly in hand-to-hand fighting, and killed several British soldiers through igniting trails of gunpowder. No mercy was given in return: the British killed around three thousand people. Some defenders, including the Rani's father Moropant, escaped the city and reformed on a nearby hill. Moropant was captured and, on 20 April, executed. Rose planned to assault the fort next, but learned on the morning of 4 April that the Rani had escaped from it overnight.

=== Escape and final battles ===
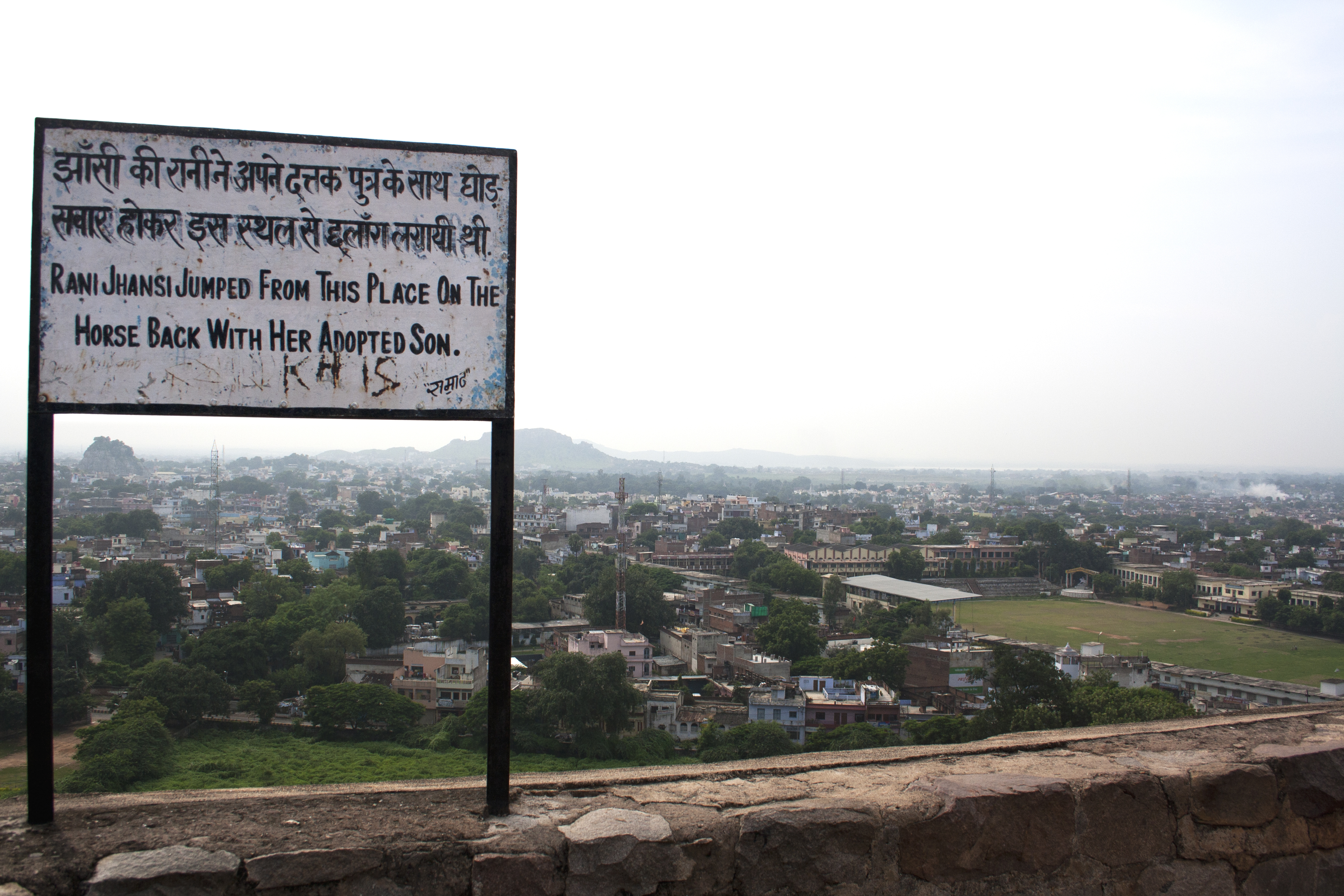
The reported site of the Rani's horseback jump from the wall of Jhansi

How the Rani managed to escape is not known fully—there are multiple accounts. One tradition tells that riding a horse, she jumped off the fort walls. One British account holds that a native soldier serving under Rose secretly arranged for a horse to be brought to the fort, so that the Rani could be lowered onto it with her adopted son. Another, told by Rose's aide-de-camp Anthony Lyster, suggests that Rose desired to avoid the extreme casualties that an assault of the fort would result in. He thus arranged a 400-yard (370 m) gap in the sentry line to bait the Rani into attempting an escape, whereupon she would be captured. Such a plan could only have been made if Rose was unaware of the Rani's skill on horseback—as he was certainly aware, Lyster's account is questionable.

Whatever the truth, accompanied by around three hundred soldiers, and with her adopted son Damodar Rao tied to her waist, the Rani managed to escape a very precarious situation. Legends say that her contingent rode the 102 miles (164 km) northeast to Kalpi in one night; more reliable sources state that she narrowly escaped a pursuing British detachment when stopping to eat a morning meal, and that she arrived at midnight on 5 April—still a feat of endurance. Kalpi, a strategic location on the Yamuna River, was the headquarters of Rao Sahib, the nephew of Lakshmibai's old friend Nana Sahib. By 27 April, an army of ten thousand soldiers had assembled there under the Rani, Tatya Tope, the raja of Banpur, and other leaders. To the Rani's disappointment, she was overlooked for command of the rebel force in favour of Tatya Tope, who probably resented her subsequent efforts to increase their force's discipline.

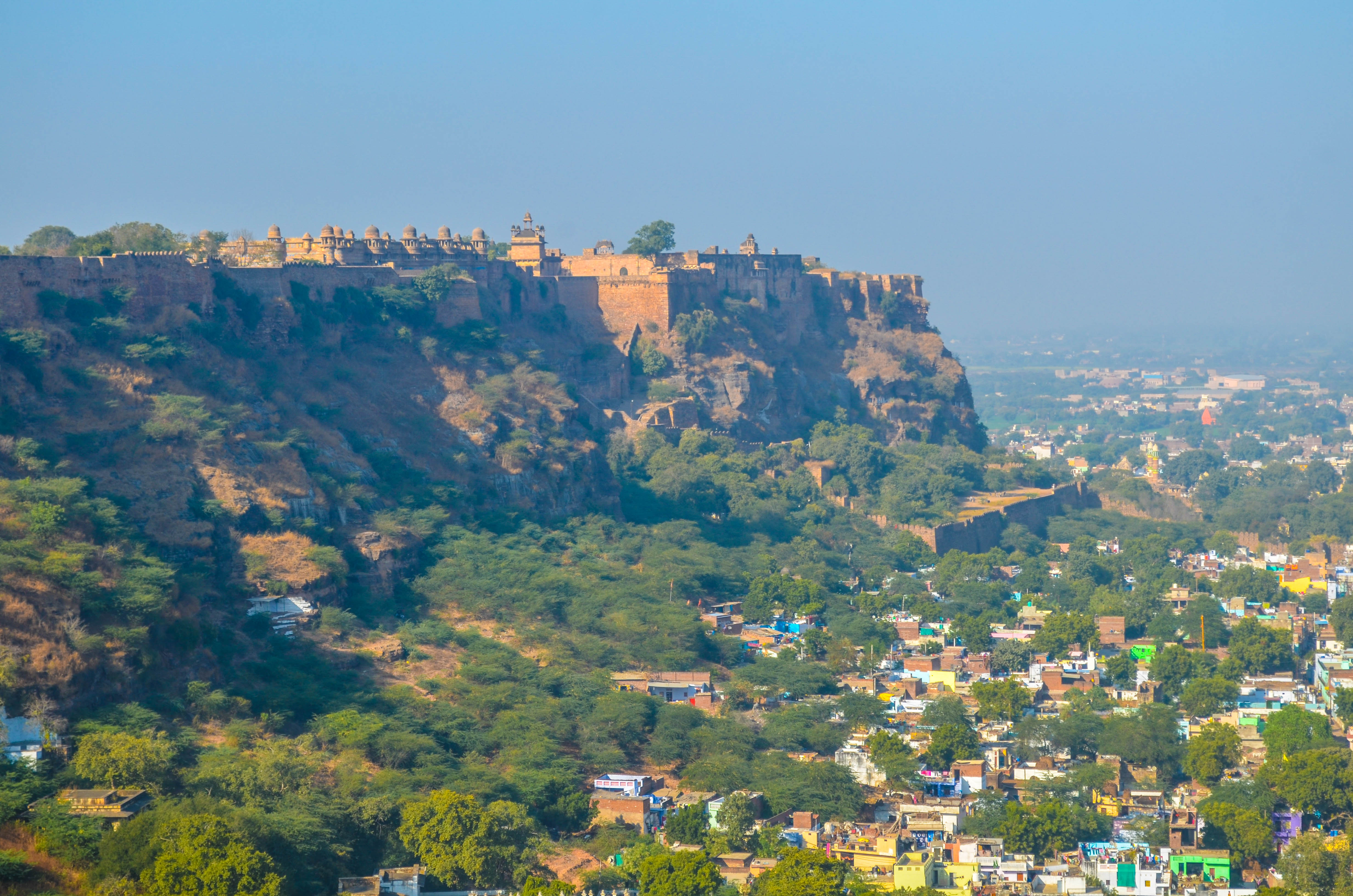
The Gwalior Fort, the last bastion of the Rani's forces, outside of which she was killed in battle

Rose's army advanced from Jhansi against Kalpi on the 26th, and Tatya Tope led his forces to confront the British at the town of Kunch. He failed to heed the Rani's advice to protect his flanks and Rose outmanoeuvred him, inflicting six hundred casualties, capturing all opposing guns, and causing severe infighting in the rebel army. Following the defeat, Tatya Tope headed to Gwalior, where he hoped to gain the allegiance of the city's eponymous Contingent. Rose regarded the Gwalior Contingent as the best army in India, but thus far they had remained loyal to the maharaja of Gwalior, whose allegiance was to the British. Meanwhile, the Rani and the other rebel leaders had prepared five lines of defence around the walls and ravines of Kalpi Fort, and attacked Rose's besieging force under a smoke screen on 22 May. Once again, the Rani's advice—to not attack on difficult ground—was ignored, and accurate musket fire followed by a bayonet charge repulsed the attack. Although Rose's army was severely weakened by the battle and the extreme heat, he did not have to attack Kalpi—the rebel leaders fled in the night.

One British officer gave the Rani credit for the idea to march to Gwalior, stating that only "she possessed the genius, the daring, the despair necessary for the conception of great deeds", although most evidence implies that it was Tatya Tope's plan. Around this time, Charles Canning, Dalhousie's successor as Governor-General, declared the Rani a rebel leader and announced a bounty of 20,000 rupees for her capture. After a brief skirmish on 31 May, the Gwalior Contingent turned on their raja, who fled to the British, and welcomed the rebels to the strategically-important Gwalior Fort. At a durbar (ceremonial court gathering) on 3 June, Rao Sahib was proclaimed viceroy of his uncle Nana Sahib amid feasts and revelry. The Rani refused to attend, because she felt the rebels were celebrating when they should have been preparing for battle; she convinced Rao Sahib to focus on the coming warfare on 5 June. The following day, Rose's army left Kalpi, arriving before Gwalior ten days later. Having studied the terrain, he ordered an attack from the south-east on 17 June.

At 7:30 am, units from the 95th Regiment of Foot twice engaged rebel forces commanded by the Rani on hilly ground between Kotah-ki-Serai and Gwalior. A charge by a squadron of the Eighth Hussars surprised and scattered her bodyguard; according to an eyewitness, the Rani, possibly accompanied by a woman companion named Mundar, charged at them. The exact manner of her death is unknown, but all accounts agree she died fighting.

=== Aftermath ===
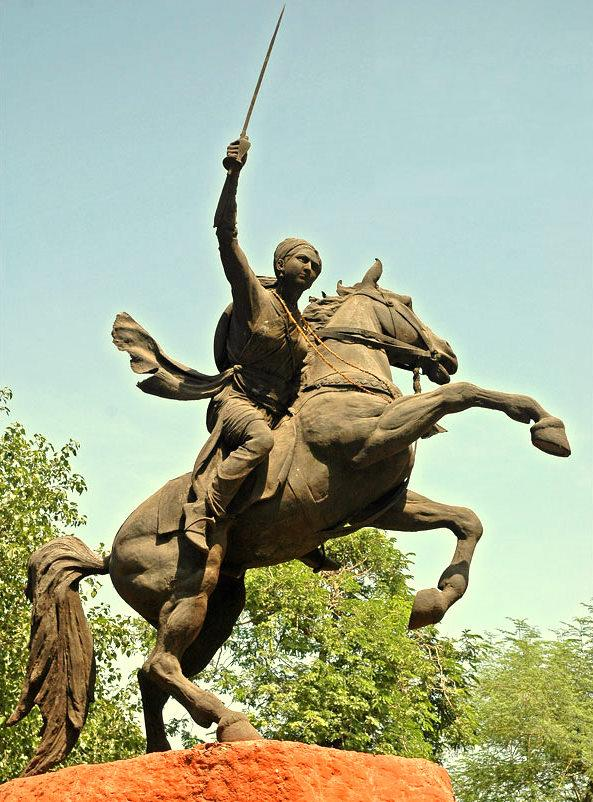
Statue of the Rani at the reported site of her death, in Gwalior (Note: Roy calls this statue "the archetypal representation ..., the inveterate fighter, the warrior queen, the Rani whose last living moments were on horseback, fighting to preserve what was dearer than her life".)

The Rani's body was likely cremated by her followers. Her death greatly demoralised the defenders of Gwalior, and Rose captured the city on 19 June, ending the last major battle of the rebellion. British reactions to her death were varied: one officer felt that the "beast of Jhansi [...] had too easy a death", while others expressed mixed pleasure and regret at the death of a worthy adversary. Rose's post-mortem assessment has been remembered, especially in India. He wrote that she was "remarkable for her beauty, cleverness, perseverance [and] generosity to her subordinates. These qualities, combined with her rank, rendered her most dangerous of all the rebel leaders." In his battle report, he wrote that she was the "best and bravest of the rebels". Others noted how Indian resistance collapsed after the death of their "most determined, spirited, and influential head", who had, as the commander of the Hussars put it, "fought like bricks".

After the fall of Gwalior, Tatya Tope and Rao Sahib continued to lead guerilla resistance against the British; eventually, both were captured and hanged. Nana Sahib's fate is unknown; rumours of his death abounded, but he continued to be "sighted" until 1895. Because of the Rani's rebellion, her adopted son Damodar Rao was stripped of the 600,000 rupees held in trust for him, and was instead allocated a monthly pension of 150 rupees. In an 1898 court case aiming to increase this to 250 rupees, he argued that his adopted mother had been a faithful and misunderstood British subject, an argument that was received badly by Indian nationalists.

== Cultural legacy ==
The story of Rani Lakshmibai, an enigmatic figure central to the events of 1857, became a legend of immense potency in India; she has been described by Harleen Singh, a scholar of South Asian women's history, as "the greatest heroine of Indian history". Many aspects of the Rani's life—the many unknown facts, her martyr-like death in battle in uncertain circumstances, and her unaccomplished goals—made her story easily transformable into myth, especially in the Indian peasant culture based around oral traditions. These traditions associate the Rani with the leitmotifs of deities of nearly all Hindu denominations: the bravery and ferocity of Durga and her aspect Chandi; the name of Lakshmi; the leaps of Hanuman; or the androgyny of Shiva. Most of all, she symbolised both the mother goddess and the primal female embodiment of reality, the Shakti. The universality of her legend's applicability contributed to its influence.

The story of the Rani became closely connected with Indian nationalism: in the late nineteenth and early twentieth centuries, even naming her in literature symbolised a nationalist spirit prohibited by the British-controlled state media. The Indian independence movement regarded the Rani as a hero in the mould of the warlord Shivaji and the mythical figures Rama, Krishna and Arjuna. After independence, this nationalist association continued in media and in education. More recently, campaign advertising from the Indian National Congress political party has depicted its leaders Indira Gandhi and Sonia Gandhi as Rani Lakshmibai reincarnated, while proponents of the Hindutva ideology idealise the Rani as a defender of Hinduism.

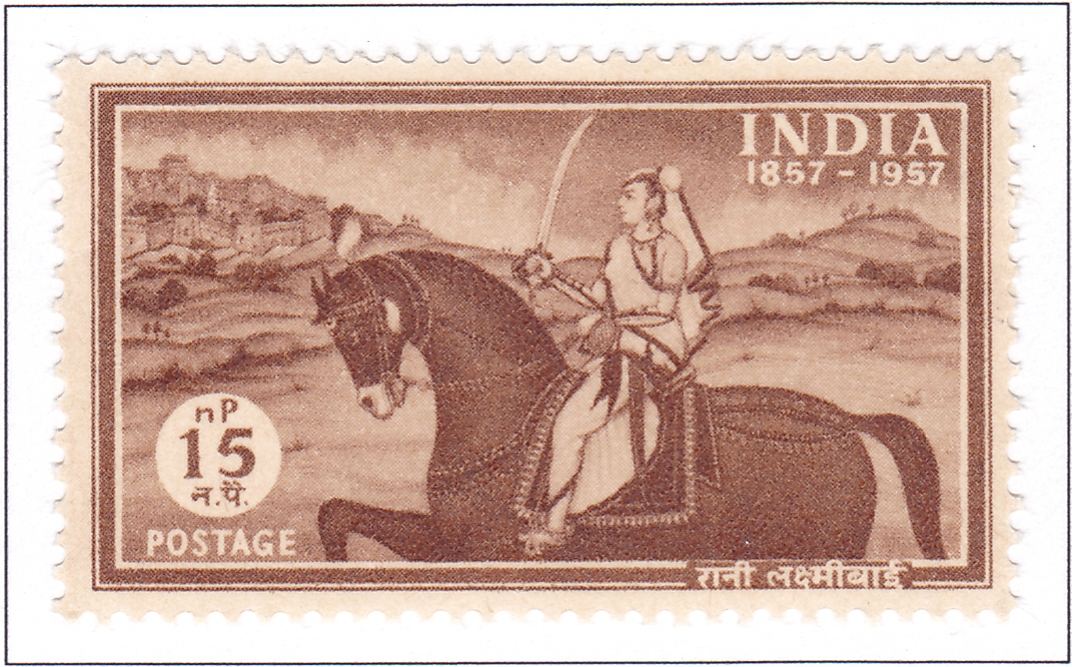
1957 postal stamp, commemorating the Rani of Jhansi and the centenary of the rebellion

In the contentious paradigm of the Indian caste system, the Rani has however also come to represent the narrative of the higher castes, who some feel had been as unfair as the British for centuries. Dalit writers have invented or embellished figures like Uda Devi and Matadin Bhangi to displace the traditionally high-caste heroes of the rebellion. One of the most famous of these Dalit heroes is Jhalkaribai: Dalit accounts often claim she was the confidante of the Rani, equal to her in martial arts, horse riding, and leadership, and superior in rebellious spirit. These accounts, which state Jhalkaribai disguised herself as the Rani to allow her to escape from Jhansi and allege that the Rani was a coward who fled and died of old age, indicate attempts to undermine the traditional upper-caste narrative. Festivals honouring the Rani and Jhalkaribai generally do not mention the other figure and are attended and promoted by different communities.

In 1943, the revolutionary Indian nationalist Subhas Chandra Bose helped to form the Indian National Army in an effort to force the British out of India as part of World War Two. Recognising the potent symbolism of the Rani, he issued a call for female volunteers, who were formed into the Rani of Jhansi Regiment. They were trained in military tactics and discipline in Singapore, and served in support roles during the brutal Burma campaign between March 1944 and August 1945, although they never fought in combat. Streets throughout India, including in the capital New Delhi, have been named after Rani Lakshmibai. She is a popular namesake for buildings, especially women's higher education institutions. She has also been depicted on postage stamps. (Note: See also Rani Jhansi Marine National Park.)

=== Literature ===
Contemporary British literature linked the Rani with the savage goddess Kali, with whose purported thuggee worshippers the British public was already acquainted. As a powerful female rebel, she was portrayed as the antithesis of British society and culture, a masculine figure who was said to have played a key role in instigating the rape and sexual violence the rebels allegedly perpetrated. Nevertheless, her heroic death in battle simultaneously allowed her to be romanticised in British literature as an analogue to Joan of Arc or Boudica; her royal status also led to comparisons with Britain's Queen Victoria. These dichotomies have influenced British depictions of the Rani, such as Alexander Rogers' 1895 novel in verse The Rani of Jhansi or The Widowed Queen, Philip Cox's 1933 play The Rani of Jhansi, and George MacDonald Fraser's 1975 novel Flashman in the Great Game, among others. Both Cox's and Fraser's works aroused controversy in India: the former for questioning the Rani's honour and revolutionary spirit, and the latter for containing explicit sexual encounters between the Rani and the English protagonist. (Note: Roy characterises Flashman as "read[ing] like a salacious nineteenth-century novel about the bewildering Oriental beauty with irresistable charm and indomitable strength of character who eventually succumbs to the white man.")

As pro-rebel narratives were barred from publication in India in the aftermath of 1857, the first Indian depictions of the Rani were oral poetry: one 1857 folk song and two ballads written in 1861 and 1870 survive. A very early Indian prose account, titled Jhansir Rani, was written in 1877 by Rabindranath Tagore, then sixteen years old. The essay praised all the heroes of 1857 but drew special attention to the Rani, whom Tagore depicted as the "epitome of virtue", in Mukherjee's words. The 1930 poem Jhansi Ki Rani by Subhadra Kumari Chauhan is perhaps the most famous literary representation of Rani Lakshmibai in India. Studied and memorised by generations of Indian children, the lengthy narrative poem remains iconic and was performed by Shubha Mudgal in Parliament House to mark the rebellion's sesquicentenary in 2007. It is especially known for the rhyming couplet which ends every stanza:

बुंदेले हरबोलों के मुँह हमने सुनी कहानी थी
खूब लड़ी मर्दानी वह तो झाँसी वाली रानी थी

We heard this story from the singers of the Bundela clan
It was the Rani of Jhansi who fought like a man.

— Subhadra Kumari Chauhan, Jhansi Ki Rani

Another prominent work is Vrindavan Lal Verma's 1946 novel Jhansi Ki Rani Lakshmibai, a work so influential it is often accorded canonical status in Indian education and literature. The quote most associated with the Rani ("I will never give up my Jhansi!") was in fact invented for the novel. Verma, who was himself a native of Jhansi, firmly established the Rani as an archetype of heroic Indian nationalism: she is explicitly depicted as an advocate of swaraj, Mahatma Gandhi's concept of "self-rule" manifested in the struggle for independence. His novel was highly praised for its strong female characters, especially the character of the Rani, who combined masculine and feminine roles, and for combining fragmentary historical narratives into a coherent, authoritarive, and yet still enjoyable work. One other work of note is Mahasweta Devi's Jhansi Rani (1956), which paid special attention to folk traditions, stories, and oral testimony especially from Dalit communities.

Indian narratives have generally struggled most with evaluating the massacre at Jhansi: either the Rani was an active participant in the rebellion from its outset, in which case she tainted her moral virtue by perpetrating the killings, or she was only a reluctant participant, which implies her subsequent heroic actions were less intentional than the traditional nationalist narrative demands.

=== Visual arts ===
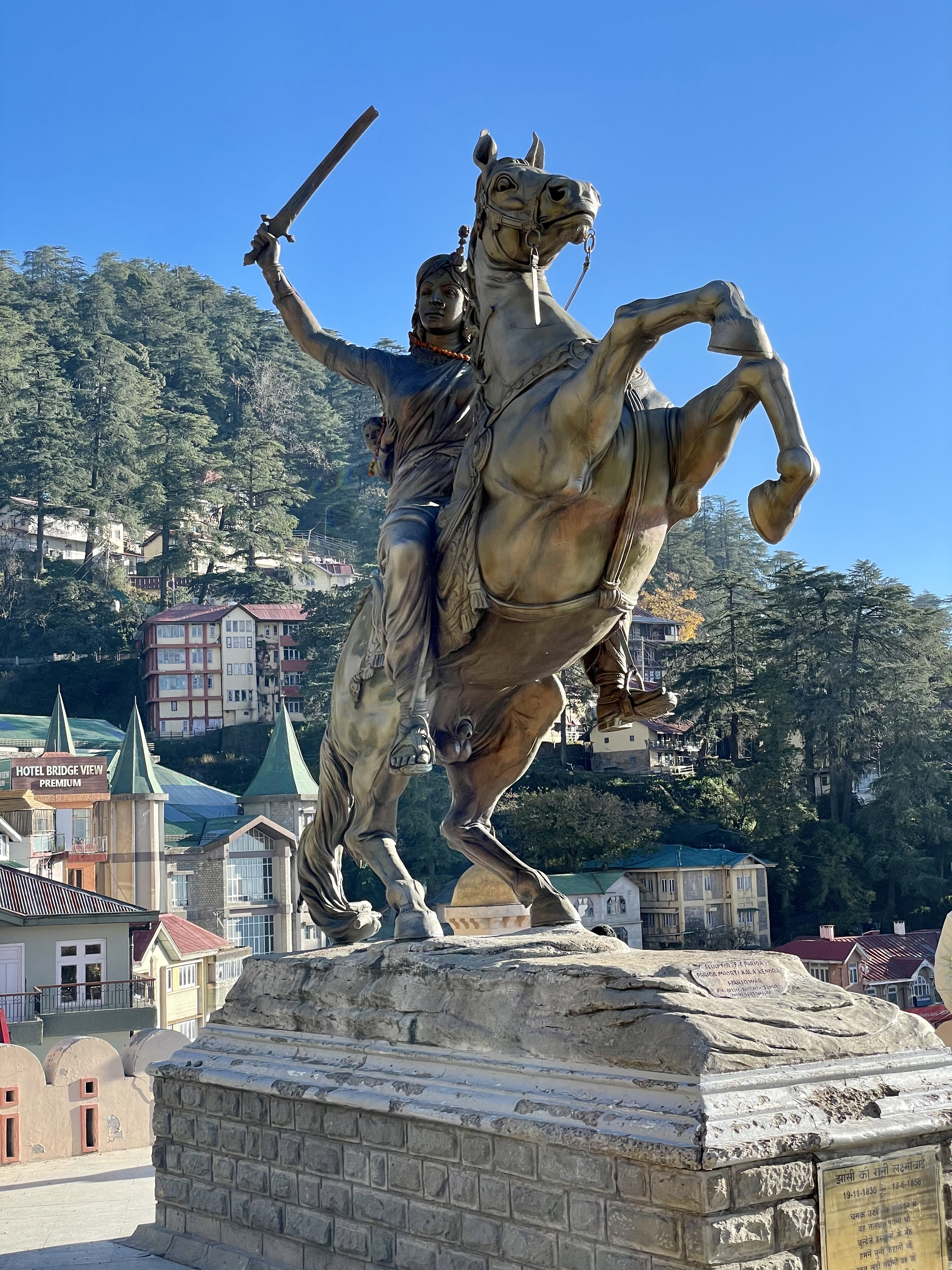
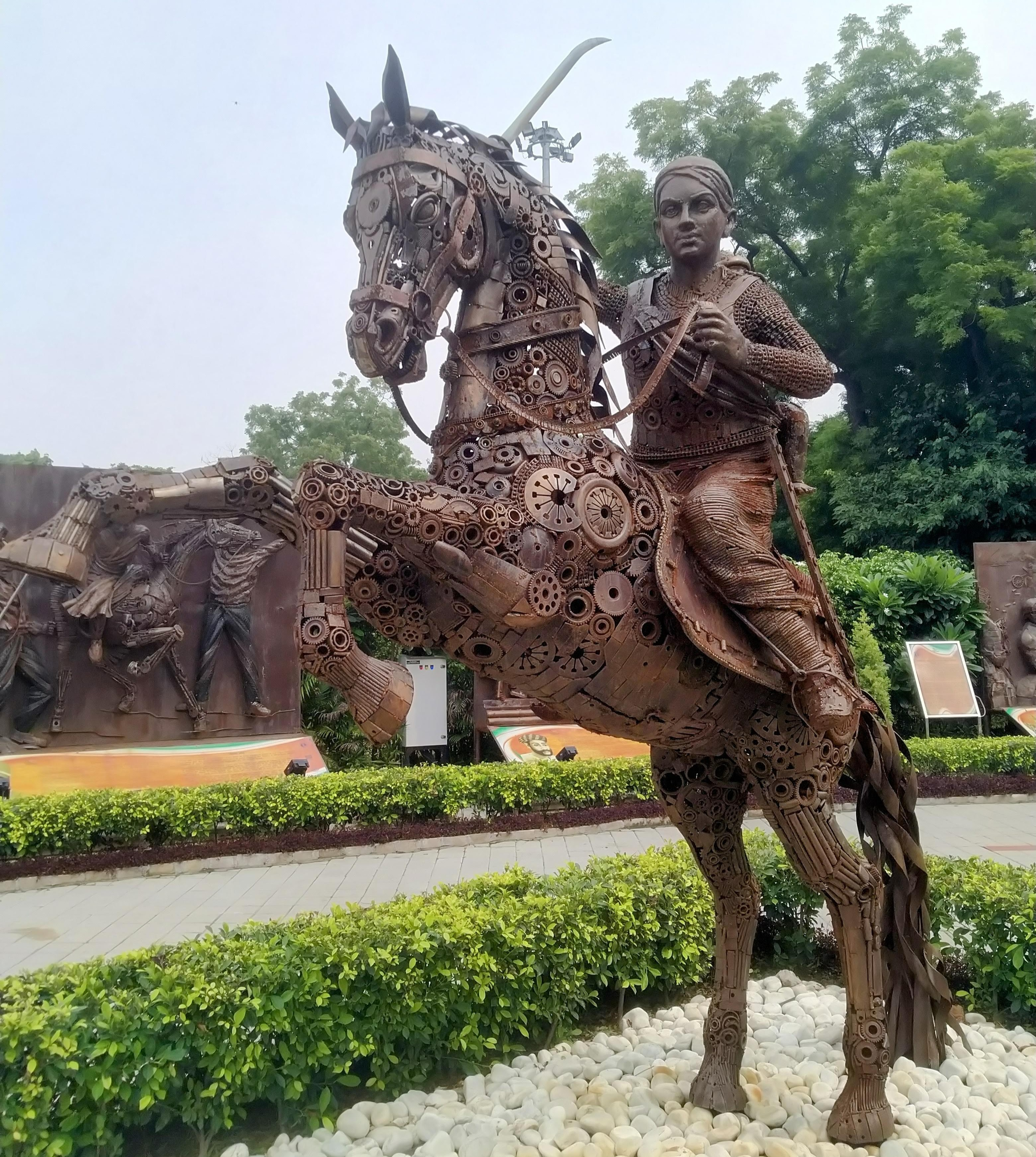
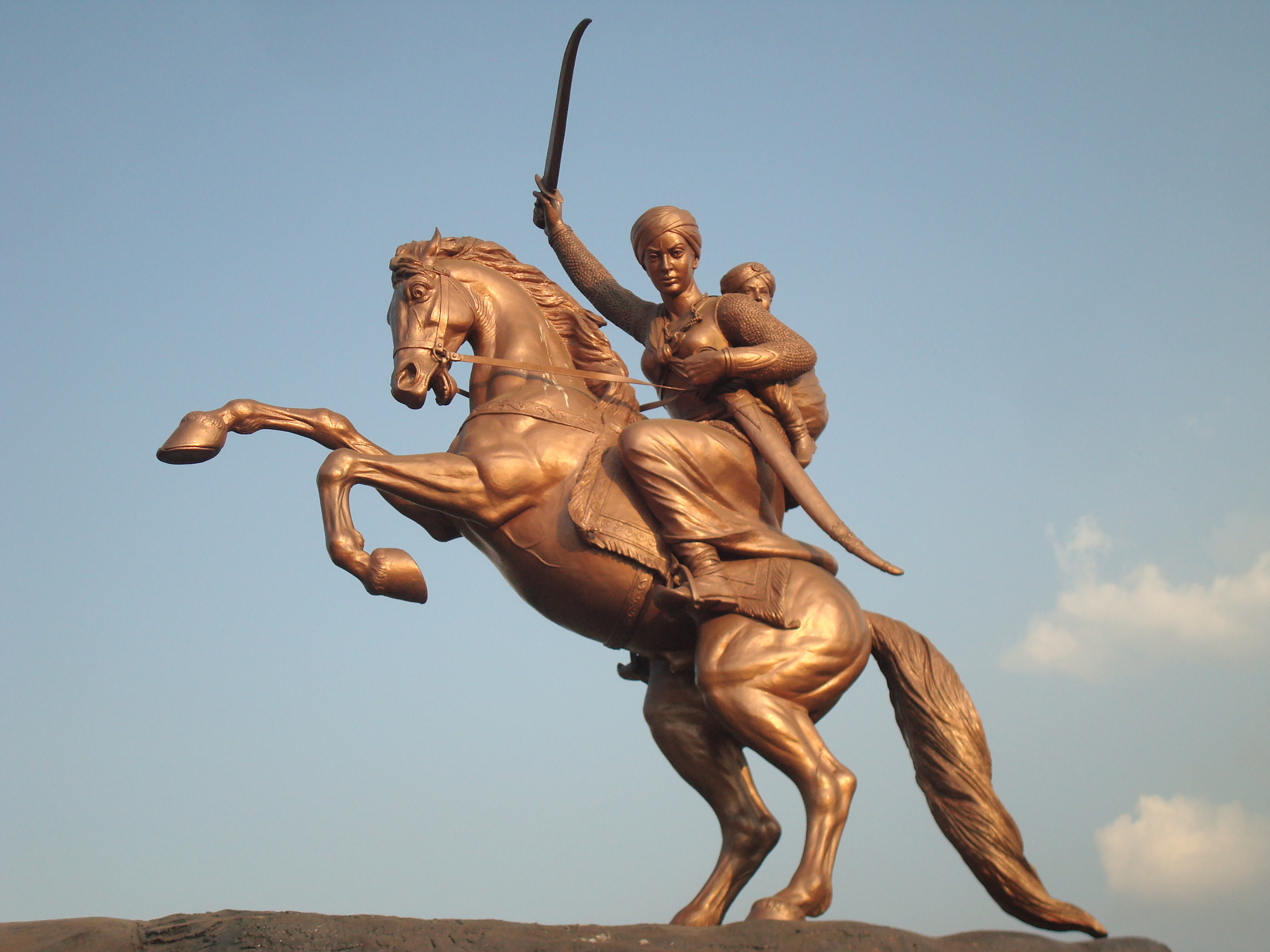
Statues of the Rani of Jhansi: in Shimla (top left), Delhi (top right), and Solapur (bottom).

No contemporary portrait of the Rani survives, although some of the artists who painted her posthumously may have seen her when she was alive. One often-copied portrait (see top of article) originally depicted her riding a horse sidesaddle, but the lower half of the painting, found in a family home in Indore, has decayed. The other major depiction (see #Early life and marriage) is less immediately recognisable as the Rani, as it only depicts her head adorned with a sari and jewellery. Under British rule, the production of these and later paintings served as covert political commentary. Numerous statues of the Rani have also been created, most portray her escape on horseback with Damodar Rao on her back, although the bronze statue on her cremation site at Gwalior depicts her alone.

In 1953, Sohrab Modi directed India's first Technicolor film, titled Jhansi Ki Rani and starring the actress Mehtab in the title role. The Rani is depicted as a revolutionary, nationalist leader from childhood, albeit one guided by a fictional male advisor. In the wake of the traumatic events of India's partition, the film includes political commentary by depicting a prominent Muslim subject as reverential towards Hindu rulers and faiths, a portrayal deliberately at odds with contemporary Islamic attitudes in India. The film ends by depicting the Rani, dying in battle, whispering her last words to the echo of the Indian national anthem, evoking an explicit connection between historical nationalism and modern independence.

Twenty-first-century depictions of Rani Lakshmibai include a television serial, Ek Veer Stree Ki Kahaani – Jhansi Ki Rani, which aired between 2009 and 2011, and the 2019 film Manikarnika: The Queen of Jhansi. Manikarnika met with protests before release, because of rumours it was based on a 2007 novel by Jaishree Misra which was banned in Uttar Pradesh because it depicted a romance between the Rani and a British officer. The film in reality contained no such story; directed by and starring Kangana Ranaut, it continued the traditional nationalist portrayal by depicting the Rani ripping the Union Jack with her sword and expertly fighting in battle.
